= Outline of Jupiter =

Fifth planet from the Sun

The following outline is provided as an overview of and topical guide to Jupiter:

Jupiter – fifth planet from the Sun and the largest in the Solar System. It is a giant planet with a mass one-thousandth that of the Sun, but two and a half times that of all the other planets in the Solar System combined. Jupiter is a gas giant, along with Saturn, with the other two giant planets, Uranus and Neptune, being ice giants. Jupiter was known to astronomers of ancient times. The Romans named it after their god Jupiter. When viewed from Earth, Jupiter can reach an apparent magnitude of −2.94, bright enough for its reflected light to cast shadows, and making it on average the third-brightest object in the night sky after the Moon and Venus.

== Contents ==
- Astronomical object
  - Gravitationally rounded object
    - Planet
      - Giant planet
        - Gas giant
          - Jupiter analogue
      - Planet of the Solar System
        - Outer planet
        - Superior planet

== Location of Jupiter ==
- Milky Way Galaxy – barred spiral galaxy
  - Orion Arm – a spiral arm of the Milky Way
    - Solar System – the Sun and the objects that orbit it, including 8 planets, the 5th planet from the sun being Jupiter
      - Orbit of Jupiter

== Features of Jupiter ==
- Magnetosphere of Jupiter
- Atmosphere of Jupiter
  - Great Red Spot
- Rings of Jupiter
- Kirkwood gap

== Natural satellites of Jupiter ==
- Moons of Jupiter
- Jupiter Trojan
- Comet Shoemaker–Levy 9

=== Inner Moons of Jupiter ===
- Metis
- Adrastea
- Amalthea
- Thebe

=== Galilean moons of Jupiter ===
- Galilean moons

==== Io ====
Io

- Volcanism on Io
- Exploration of Io
- Regions on Io
- Volcanic features on Io
- Mountains on Io
- Quadrangles on Io

==== Europa ====
Europa

- Geological features on Europa
- Craters on Europa
- Lineae on Europa
- Quadrangles on Europa

==== Ganymede ====
Ganymede

- List of geological features on Ganymede
- List of craters on Ganymede
- List of quadrangles on Ganymede

==== Callisto ====
Callisto

- List of geological features on Callisto
- List of craters on Callisto
- List of quadrangles on Callisto
- Valhalla

=== Irregular prograde moons of Jupiter ===
- Themisto
- Carpo
- Valetudo

==== Himalia group of moons of Jupiter ====
Himalia group

- Leda
- Himalia
- Ersa
- Pandia
- Lysithea
- Elara
- Dia

=== Ananke group of moons of Jupiter ===
Ananke group

- S/2003 J 12
- Euporie
- Eupheme
- Jupiter LV
- Jupiter LII
- Thelxinoe
- Euanthe
- Helike
- Orthosie
- Jupiter LXVIII
- Jupiter LIV
- Jupiter LXIV
- Iocaste
- S/2003 J 16
- Praxidike
- Harpalyke
- Mneme
- Hermippe
- Thyone
- Jupiter LXX
- Ananke
- Jupiter LXXIII

=== Carme group of moons of Jupiter ===
Carme group

- Jupiter LXXII
- Herse
- Aitne
- Kale
- Taygete
- Jupiter LXI
- Chaldene
- S/2003 J 10
- Erinome
- Kallichore
- Jupiter LXVI
- Jupiter LXIX
- Kalyke
- Carme
- Jupiter LXIII
- Pasithee
- Jupiter LI
- Eukelade
- Arche
- Isonoe
- S/2003 J 9
- Eirene

=== Pasiphae group of moons of Jupiter ===
Pasiphae group

- Jupiter LXVII
- Philophrosyne
- S/2003 J 23
- Aoede
- Callirrhoe
- Eurydome
- Kore
- Cyllene
- Jupiter LVI
- Jupiter LIX
- S/2003 J 4
- Pasiphae
- Hegemone
- Sinope
- Sponde
- Autonoe
- Megaclite

== History of Jupiter ==
History of Jupiter

== Exploration of Jupiter ==
Exploration of Jupiter

=== Flyby missions to explore Jupiter ===
- Pioneer program
- Pioneer 10
- Pioneer 11
- Voyager program
- Voyager 1
- Voyager 2
- Ulysses
- Cassini–Huygens
- New Horizons
- Europa Clipper
- Jupiter Icy Moons Explorer

=== Direct missions to explore Jupiter ===
- Galileo
- Juno

=== Proposed missions to explore Jupiter ===
- EJSM/Laplace
- Jupiter Europa Orbiter
- Jupiter Ganymede Orbiter
- Jupiter Magnetospheric Orbiter
- Io Volcano Observer
- Colonization of Europa

=== Cancelled missions to explore Jupiter ===
- Jupiter Icy Moons Orbiter
- Europa Orbiter
- Pioneer H

=== Exploration of Jupiter's moons ===
- Exploration of Callisto
- Exploration of Europa
- Exploration of Ganymede
- Exploration of Io

== Jupiter-related fiction ==
- Jupiter in fiction
- Jupiter's moons in fiction
- Jovian–Plutonian gravitational effect
- Jupiter Effect

== Jupiter-related organizations ==
- NASA

== Jupiter-related publications ==
- Sidereus Nuncius

== See also ==
- Outline of astronomy
  - Outline of the Solar System
- Outline of space exploration
