= S/2003 J 24 =

Moon of Jupiter

Discovery
- Discovery date: February 5, 2003 (announced 2021)

Orbital characteristics
- Observation arc: 21 years 2024-12-03 (last obs)
- Semi-major axis: 23.088 million km (14.346 million mi)
- Eccentricity: 0.25
- Satellite of: Jupiter
- Group: Carme group

Physical characteristics
- Mean diameter: 3 km (2 mi) (est.)
- Albedo: 0.04 (est.)
- Apparent magnitude: 23.6
- Absolute magnitude (H): 16.65 (90 obs)

S/2003 J 24 (temporarily designated EJc0061) is a moon of Jupiter, discovered by Scott S. Sheppard et al. in 2003. It was independently found by amateur astronomer K Ly, who reported it on June 30, 2021. It was formally announced on 15 November 2021 in the MPEC.

Ly had previously recovered four "lost" moons of Jupiter in 2020: S/2003 J 23, S/2003 J 12, S/2003 J 4, and Jupiter LXXIII.

Based on 90 observations with an absolute magnitude (H) of 16.7, the moon is about 2–3 km in diameter.

S/2003 J 24 orbits Jupiter at an average distance of 23,088,000 km (0.15433 AU) in 715.4 days, at an inclination of 162° to the ecliptic, in a retrograde direction and with an eccentricity of 0.25.

It belongs to the Carme group, made up of irregular retrograde moons orbiting Jupiter at a distance ranging between 23 and 24 million km and at an inclination of about 165°.
