= Autonoe (moon) =

Moon of Jupiter

- Discovery images of Autonoe by the Canada-France-Hawaii Telescope in December 2001

Discovery
- Discovered by: Scott S. Sheppard et al.
- Discovery site: Mauna Kea Obs.
- Discovery date: 10 December 2001

Designations
- Designation: Jupiter XXVIII
- Pronunciation: /ɔːˈtɒnoʊ.iː/
- Named after: Αυτονόη Autonoē
- Alternative names: S/2001 J 1
- Adjectives: Autonoean /ˌɔːtənoʊˈiːən/

Orbital characteristics
- Observation arc: 24 years 2025-12-21 (last obs)
- Semi-major axis: 23039000 km
- Eccentricity: 0.334
- Orbital period (sidereal): −719.01 days
- Inclination: 152.9°
- Satellite of: Jupiter
- Group: Pasiphae group

Physical characteristics
- Mean diameter: 4 km
- Albedo: 0.04 (assumed)
- Spectral type: B–V = 0.72 ± 0.03, V–R = 0.51 ± 0.02
- Apparent magnitude: 22.0
- Absolute magnitude (H): 15.5

Autonoe /ɔːˈtɒnoʊ.iː/, also known as Jupiter XXVIII, and previously as S/2001 J 1, is a small natural satellite or moon of Jupiter. Autonoe is one of the outermost irregular satellites of Jupiter, which orbit far from the planet on highly inclined and eccentric orbits. Autonoe was discovered by a team of astronomers from the University of Hawaiʻi led by Scott S. Sheppard in 2001, and was named after the Greek mythological figure Autonoe.

It orbits Jupiter in the retrograde direction—opposite to the direction of the planet's rotation—at an average distance of 23.7 million km (14.7 million mi). Autonoe shares similar orbital properties as Jupiter's larger irregular moon Pasiphae, which makes it a member of the Pasiphae group.The moons of the Pasiphae group are a group moons are believed to be fragments of an asteroid or trans-Neptunian object that was gravitationally captured by Jupiter and destroyed by a collision several billion years ago.

Due to different colour, Autonoe could be also an independent object, captured independently, unrelated to the collision and break-up at the origin of the group. Autonoe's physical properties are unknown, it estimated to be about 4 km in diameter and its surface is be probably dark and lightred in color.

== Discovery and naming ==
Autonoe was discovered in Dezember 2001, along with ten other Jovian moons by a team of astronomers from the University of Hawaiʻi led by Scott S. Sheppard and given the temporary designation S/2001 J 1.

Autonoe was named in August 2003 after the Greek mythological figure Autonoe, conquest of Zeus (Jupiter), mother of the Charites (Graces), according to some authors.

== Orbit ==
The diagram illustrates Autonoe's orbital elements in relation to other satellites of the Pasiphae group.

The satellite orbits Jupiter at a mean distance of 23.785.200 km and completes one orbit in 749,61 days. Its orbit has an inclination of 150.7° relative to the ecliptic and an eccentricity of 0.326. The orbit is subject to continuous changes due to gravitational perturbation from the Sun and the other planets.

=== Group membership and origin ===
Autonoe belongs to the Pasiphae group, a group of irregular retrograde Jovian moons. Members of this group have orbits with semimajor axes ranging from approximately 22 to 25 million km, orbital inclinations between 141° and 158°, and relatively high eccentricities ranging from 0.22 to 0.44. The moons of the Pasiphae group are believed to be fragments of an asteroid or trans-Neptunian object that was gravitationally captured by Jupiter and destroyed by a collision several billion years ago.

Due to different colour, Autonoe is different from the other Pasiphae moons. Autonoe could be also an independent object, captured independently, unrelated to the collision and break-up at the origin of the group.

== Physical characteristics ==
Due to its small size, Autonoe appears very faint from Earth with a visual apparent magnitude of around 22, so it can only be observed by very large, sensitive telescopes. Assuming Autonoe has a low geometric albedo of 0.04 like other irregular moons, 's diameter has been estimated to be 4 km. The shape of the moon is currently unknown. However, given its small size, Autonoe is likely to have an irregular shape, similar to other irregular moons.

While Pasiphae belongs to the grey color class ( B−V=0.74, V−R=0.38), Autonoe falls under the light red color class (B–V = 0,72 ± 0,03, V–R = 0,51 ± 0,02), similarly to Megaclite and Sinope.

== Exploration ==
Autonoe has not been imaged up close by a space probe. All Jupiter irregular moons including Autonoe are planned to be distant observation targets for the European Space Agency's Jupiter Icy Moons Explorer (Juice) mission, which will measure the Jupiter irregular moons' rotation periods and shapes by watching their brightness change over time.

== See also ==
- Moons of Jupiter
