= Scott S. Sheppard =

American astronomer (born 1977)

- Website: sites.google.com/carnegiescience.edu/sheppard/home

Scott Sander Sheppard (born 1977) is an American astronomer and a discoverer of numerous moons, comets and minor planets in the outer Solar System.

He is an astronomer in the Department of Terrestrial Magnetism at the Carnegie Institution for Science in Washington, DC. He attended Oberlin College as an undergraduate, and received his bachelor in physics with honors in 1998. Starting as a graduate student at the Institute for Astronomy at the University of Hawaiʻi at Mānoa, he was credited with the discovery of many small moons of Jupiter, Saturn, Uranus, and Neptune. He has also discovered the first known trailing Neptune trojan, 2008 LC18, the first named leading Neptune trojan, 385571 Otrera, and the first high inclination Neptune trojan, 2005 TN53. These discoveries showed that the Neptune trojan objects are mostly on highly inclined orbits and thus likely captured small bodies from elsewhere in the Solar System.

The main-belt asteroid 17898 Scottsheppard, discovered by LONEOS at Anderson Mesa Station in 1999, was named in his honor.

== Discoveries ==
Minor planets discovered: 23
(79978) 1999 CC158	15 February 1999	list^{[A]}^{[B]}^{[C]}
(131695) 2001 XS_{254}	9 December 2001	list^{[B]}^{[D]}
(131696) 2001 XT254	9 December 2001	list^{[B]}^{[D]}
(131697) 2001 XH255	11 December 2001	list^{[B]}^{[D]}
(148975) 2001 XA255	9 December 2001	list^{[B]}^{[D]}
(168700) 2000 GE_{147}	2 April 2000	list^{[B]}^{[C]}
(200840) 2001 XN_{254}	9 December 2001	list
341520 Mors–Somnus	14 October 2007	list^{[C]}
385571 Otrera	16 October 2004	list^{[C]}
385695 Clete	8 October 2005	list^{[C]}
(469420) 2001 XP_{254}	10 December 2001	list^{[B]}^{[D]}
(469421) 2001 XD_{255}	9 December 2001	list^{[B]}^{[D]}
471143 Dziewanna	13 March 2010	list^{[C]}^{[E]}^{[F]}
(471165) 2010 HE_{79}	21 April 2010	list^{[C]}^{[E]}^{[G]}
(471921) 2013 FC_{28}	17 March 2013	list^{[C]}
(508792) 2000 FX_{53}	31 March 2000	list^{[B]}^{[C]}
(523671) 2013 FZ_{27}	16 March 2013	list
(523672) 2013 FJ_{28}	16 March 2013	list
(523693) 2014 FT_{71}	24 March 2014	list
(524365) 2001 XQ_{254}	10 December 2001	list^{[B]}^{[D]}
(524366) 2001 XR_{254}	10 December 2001	list^{[B]}^{[D]}
532037 Chiminigagua	17 March 2013	list^{[C]}
(532038) 2013 FB_{28}	17 March 2013	list^{[C]}
541132 Leleākūhonua	13 October 2015	list^{[C]}^{[H]}
2021 PH27	13 August 2021	MPC
2022 AP7	13 January 2022	MPC
^{A} with J. X. Luu^{B} with D. C. Jewitt^{C} with Chadwick Trujillo^{D} with J. T. Kleyna^{E} with A. Udalski^{F} with M. Kubiak^{G} with R. Poleski^{H} with D. J. Tholen

Sheppard was the lead discoverer of the object with the most distant orbit known in the Solar System, 2012 VP113 (nicknamed Biden). In 2014, the similarity of the orbit of 2012 VP_{113} to other extreme Kuiper belt object orbits led Sheppard and Trujillo to propose that an unknown Super-Earth mass planet (2–15 Earth masses) in the outermost Solar System beyond 200 AU and up to 1500 AU is shepherding these smaller bodies into similar orbits (see Planet X or Planet Nine). The extreme trans-Neptunian objects 2013 FT28 and 2014 SR349, announced in 2016 and co-discovered by Sheppard, further show a likely unknown massive planet exists beyond a few hundred AU in the Solar System, with 2013 FT_{28} being the first known high semi-major axis and high perihelion object anti-aligned with the other known extreme objects. In 2018, the announcement of the high perihelion inner Oort cloud object 541132 Leleākūhonua (nicknamed "The Goblin") by Sheppard et al., being only the third known after 2012 VP_{113} and Sedna, further demonstrated that a super-Earth planet in the distant Solar System likely exists as Leleākūhonua has many orbital similarities as the two other known inner Oort cloud objects.

=== Most notable discoveries ===
Sheppard has been involved in the discovery of many small Solar System bodies such as trans-Neptunian objects, centaurs, comets and near-Earth objects.

- Three comets are named after him which are Sheppard-Trujillo (C/2014 F3), Sheppard-Tholen (C/2015 T5) and comet Trujillo-Sheppard (P/2018 V5).
- The possible dwarf planets discovered by Sheppard are 471143 Dziewanna, 2010 KZ39, 2010 FX86, 532037 Chiminigagua, (523671) 2013 FZ27 and 2015 KH162.
- In 2018, Sheppard was the lead discoverer of the most distant observed object in the Solar System and first object observed beyond 100 AU, possible dwarf planet 2018 VG18 (nicknamed Farout), which is around 120 AU from the Sun.
- He discovered a minor-planet moon around likely dwarf planet Chiminigagua.
- He is also a co-discoverer of a minor-planet moon orbiting the binary trans-Neptunian object 341520 Mors–Somnus.
- Among the numerous irregular moons of the major planets in whose discovery he has been involved are:

Jupiter

Discovered moons of Jupiter (full list):

- Themisto (2000), first seen but lost in 1975 by Charles Kowal
- Harpalyke (2000)
- Praxidike (2000)
- Chaldene (2000)
- Isonoe (2000)
- Erinome (2000)
- Taygete (2000)
- Kalyke (2000)
- Megaclite (2000)
- Iocaste (2000)
- Dia (2000)
- Euporie (2001)
- Orthosie (2001)
- Euanthe (2001)
- Thyone (2001)
- Hermippe (2001)
- Pasithee (2001)
- Aitne (2001)
- Eurydome (2001)
- Autonoe (2001)
- Sponde (2001)
- Kale (2001)
- Arche (2002)
- Eukelade (2003)
- Helike (2003)
- Aoede (2003)
- Hegemone (2003)
- Kallichore (2003)
- Cyllene (2003)
- Mneme (2003)
- Thelxinoe (2003)
- Carpo (2003)
- Kore (2003)
- Herse (2003)
- Jupiter LXXIII (2003)
- Eupheme (2003)
- S/2003 J 4 (2003)
- Eirene (2003)
- S/2003 J 9 (2003)
- S/2003 J 10 (2003)
- S/2003 J 12 (2003)
- Philophrosyne (2003)
- S/2003 J 16 (2003)
- Jupiter LV (2003)
- Jupiter LXI (2003)
- S/2003 J 23 (2003)
- S/2003 J 24 (2003)
- S/2010 J 3 (2010)
- S/2010 J 4 (2010)
- S/2010 J 6 (2010)
- Jupiter LXXII (2011)
- Jupiter LVI (2011)
- S/2011 J 3 (2011)
- S/2011 J 4 (2011)
- S/2011 J 5 (2011)
- S/2011 J 6 (2011)
- Jupiter LIV (2016)
- Valetudo (2016)
- S/2016 J 3 (2016)
- S/2016 J 4 (2016)
- Jupiter LIX (2017)
- Jupiter LXIII (2017)
- Jupiter LXIV (2017)
- Pandia (2017)
- Jupiter LXVI (2017)
- Jupiter LXVII (2017)
- Jupiter LXVIII (2017)
- Jupiter LXIX (2017)
- Jupiter LXX (2017)
- S/2017 J 10 (2017)
- S/2017 J 11 (2017)
- S/2017 J 12 (2017)
- S/2017 J 13 (2017)
- S/2017 J 14 (2017)
- S/2017 J 15 (2017)
- S/2017 J 16 (2017)
- S/2017 J 17 (2017)
- S/2017 J 18 (2017)
- Ersa (2018)
- S/2018 J 2 (2018)
- S/2018 J 3 (2018)
- S/2018 J 4 (2018)
- S/2018 J 5 (2018)
- S/2021 J 1 (2021)
- S/2021 J 2 (2021)
- S/2021 J 3 (2021)
- S/2021 J 4 (2021)
- S/2021 J 5 (2021)
- S/2021 J 6 (2021)
- S/2021 J 7 (2021)
- S/2021 J 8 (2021)
- S/2022 J 1 (2022)
- S/2022 J 2 (2022)
- S/2022 J 3 (2022)
- S/2024 J 1 (2024)

Saturn

Discovered moons of Saturn (full list):

- Narvi (2003)
- Fornjot (2004)
- Farbauti (2004)
- Aegir (2004)
- Bebhionn (2004)
- Hati (2004)
- Bergelmir (2004)
- Fenrir (2004)
- Bestla (2004)
- Saturn LXVII (2004)
- S/2004 S 12 (2004)
- S/2004 S 13 (2004)
- S/2004 S 17 (2004)
- Hyrrokkin (2004)
- Gridr (2004)
- S/2004 S 21 (2004)
- Angrboda (2004)
- Skrymir (2004)
- S/2004 S 24 (2004)
- Gerd (2004)
- Saturn LVIII (2004)
- Eggther (2004)
- S/2004 S 28 (2004)
- Saturn LX (2004)
- Beli (2004)
- S/2004 S 31 (2004)
- Gunnlod (2004)
- Thiazzi (2004)
- Saturn LXIV (2004)
- Alvaldi (2004)
- S/2004 S 36 (2004)
- S/2004 S 37 (2004)
- Geirrod (2004)
- S/2004 S 39 (2004)
- S/2004 S 40 (2004)
- S/2004 S 41 (2004)
- S/2004 S 42 (2004)
- S/2004 S 43 (2004)
- S/2004 S 44 (2004)
- S/2004 S 45 (2004)
- S/2004 S 46 (2004)
- S/2004 S 47 (2004)
- S/2004 S 48 (2004)
- S/2004 S 49 (2004)
- S/2004 S 50 (2004)
- S/2004 S 51 (2004)
- S/2004 S 52 (2004)
- S/2004 S 53 (2004)
- S/2004 S 54 (2004)
- S/2004 S 55 (2004)
- S/2004 S 56 (2004)
- S/2004 S 57 (2004)
- S/2004 S 58 (2004)
- S/2004 S 59 (2004)
- S/2004 S 60 (2004)
- S/2004 S 61 (2004)
- S/2005 S 4 (2005)
- S/2005 S 5 (2005)
- S/2005 S 6 (2005)
- S/2005 S 7 (2005)
- Kari (2006)
- Loge (2006)
- Surtur (2006)
- Skoll (2006)
- Greip (2006)
- Jarnsaxa (2006)
- S/2006 S 1 (2006)
- S/2006 S 3 (2006)
- S/2006 S 9 (2006)
- S/2006 S 10 (2006)
- S/2006 S 11 (2006)
- S/2006 S 12 (2006)
- S/2006 S 13 (2006)
- S/2006 S 14 (2006)
- S/2006 S 15 (2006)
- S/2006 S 16 (2006)
- S/2006 S 17 (2006)
- S/2006 S 18 (2006)
- S/2006 S 19 (2006)
- S/2006 S 20 (2006)
- S/2006 S 21 (2006)
- S/2006 S 22 (2006)
- S/2006 S 23 (2006)
- S/2006 S 24 (2006)
- S/2006 S 25 (2006)
- S/2006 S 26 (2006)
- S/2006 S 27 (2006)
- S/2006 S 28 (2006)
- S/2006 S 29 (2006)
- Tarqeq (2007)
- S/2007 S 2 (2007)
- S/2007 S 3 (2007)
- S/2007 S 5 (2007)
- S/2007 S 6 (2007)
- S/2007 S 7 (2007)
- S/2007 S 8 (2007)
- S/2007 S 9 (2007)
- S/2007 S 10 (2007)
- S/2007 S 11 (2007)
- S/2019 S 3 (2019)
- S/2019 S 9 (2019)
- S/2019 S 11 (2019)
- S/2019 S 17 (2019)
- S/2019 S 18 (2019)
- S/2019 S 21 (2019)
- S/2019 S 24 (2019)
- S/2019 S 25 (2019)
- S/2019 S 27 (2019)
- S/2019 S 29 (2019)
- S/2019 S 31 (2019)
- S/2019 S 33 (2019)
- S/2019 S 34 (2019)
- S/2019 S 40 (2019)
- S/2019 S 42 (2019)
- S/2019 S 43 (2019)
- S/2020 S 1 (2020)
- S/2020 S 8 (2020)
- S/2020 S 26 (2020)
- S/2020 S 27 (2020)

Uranus

Discovered moons of Uranus (full list):

- Margaret (2003)
- Ferdinand (2003), first seen but lost in 2001 by Holman et al.
- S/2023 U 1 (2023)

Neptune

Discovered moons of Neptune (full list):

- Psamathe (2003)
- S/2002 N 5 (2021), first seen but lost in 2002 by Holman et al.
- S/2021 N 1 (2021)

== See also ==
- List of minor planet discoverers § Discovering astronomers
