= Eupheme (moon) =

Outer moon of Jupiter

- Images of Eupheme by the Canada-France-Hawaii Telescope in February 2003

Discovery
- Discovered by: Scott S. Sheppard
- Discovery date: 2003

Designations
- Designation: Jupiter LX
- Pronunciation: /juːˈfiːmiː/
- Named after: Ευφήμη Eyphēmē
- Alternative names: S/2003 J 3
- Adjectives: Euphemean /juːfɪˈmiːən/

Orbital characteristics
- Epoch 2026-01-01
- Observation arc: 21 years 2024-12-03 (last obs)
- Periapsis: 12.7 million km
- Apoapsis: 27.7 million km (2026-Jan-23)
- Semi-major axis: 20.2 million km
- Eccentricity: 0.371
- Orbital period (sidereal): −587.7 days
- Average orbital speed: 2.5 km/s
- Mean anomaly: 164°
- Inclination: 148.0°
- Longitude of ascending node: 325°
- Argument of perihelion: 119°
- Satellite of: Jupiter
- Group: Ananke group

Physical characteristics
- Mean diameter: 2 km
- Apparent magnitude: 23.4
- Absolute magnitude (H): 16.47 (30 obs)

Eupheme /juːˈfiːmiː/, also Jupiter LX, originally known as S/2003 J 3, is an outer irregular satellite of Jupiter, 2 km in diameter. It orbits Jupiter at an average distance of 20 million km, but gets as far away as 27.7 million km. (Note: Jupiter's moon Pasiphae gets as far as 35.9 million km from Jupiter. By 2038, Jupiter's moon Kore will get as far as 38.5 million km from Jupiter.)

== Discovery ==
It was discovered by a team of astronomers from the University of Hawaiʻi led by Scott S. Sheppard in 2003. The moon was lost following its discovery in 2003. It was recovered in 2017 and given its permanent designation that year.

== Name ==
It was named in 2019 after Eupheme, the ancient Greek spirit of words of good omen, praise, acclaims, shouts of triumph, and applause, the daughter of Hephaestus and Aglaea and granddaughter of Zeus. The name was suggested by Twitter user Lunartic (@iamalunartic) in a naming contest held by the Carnegie Institute on the social network who concurrently helped in naming another Jovian moon Philophrosyne. The name ends in an "e" because the orbit is retrograde.

== Orbit ==
Eupheme orbits Jupiter at an average distance of 20 million km in 588 days, at an inclination of 148° to the ecliptic, in a retrograde direction and with an eccentricity of 0.370. It belongs to the Ananke group, retrograde irregular moons that orbit Jupiter between 19.3 and 22.7 million km, at inclinations of roughly 150°.

Eupheme came to apojove (farthest distance from Jupiter) on 23 January 2026 when it was 0.185 AU (27.7 million km; 17.2 million mi) from Jupiter.
