= Callirrhoe (moon) =

Moon of Jupiter

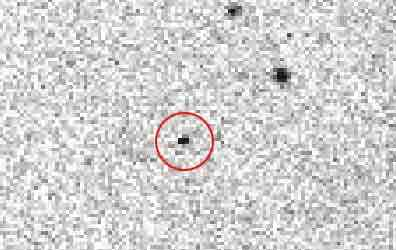
- This discovery image of Callirrhoe taken by Spacewatch in October 1999

Discovery
- Discovered by: Spacewatch (Note: The discovery is credited to the team of astronomers consisting of J. V. Scotti, T. B. Spahr, R. S. McMillan, J. A. Larson, J. Montani, A. E. Gleason, and T. Gehrels.)
- Discovery site: Kitt Peak National Observatory
- Discovery date: 19 October 1999

Designations
- Designation: Jupiter XVII
- Pronunciation: /kəˈlɪroʊiː/
- Named after: Καλλιρρόη Kallirrhoê
- Alternative names: S/1999 J 1; 1999 UX_{18}

Orbital characteristics
- Epoch 2026-01-01
- Observation arc: 17.54 yr (6,406 days)
- Periapsis: 15.6 million km
- Apoapsis: 30.9 million km
- Semi-major axis: 23.3 million km
- Eccentricity: 0.329
- Orbital period (sidereal): –724.4 days
- Mean anomaly: 322°
- Mean motion: 0° 27^{m} 25.866^{s} / day
- Inclination: 147.3° (to ecliptic)
- Longitude of ascending node: 32.2°
- Argument of perihelion: 102.2°
- Satellite of: Jupiter
- Group: Pasiphae group

Physical characteristics
- Mean diameter: 9.6±1.3 km
- Albedo: 0.052±0.016
- Spectral type: D
- Apparent magnitude: 20.8
- Absolute magnitude (H): 13.92±0.02

Callirrhoe (/kəˈlɪroʊ.iː/; Greek: Καλλιρρόη), also known as Jupiter XVII, and previously as S/1999 J 1, is a small natural satellite or moon of Jupiter. Callirrhoe is one of the outermost irregular satellites of Jupiter, which orbit far from the planet on highly inclined and eccentric orbits. Callirrhoe was imaged by Spacewatch at Kitt Peak National Observatory from 6 October through 4 November 1999.

It orbits Jupiter in the retrograde direction—opposite to the direction of the planet's rotation—at an average distance of 23.3 million km (14.5 million mi). Callirrhoe shares similar orbital properties as Jupiter's larger irregular moon Pasiphae, which makes it a member of the Pasiphae group.The moons of the Pasiphae group are a group moons are believed to be fragments of an asteroid or trans-Neptunian object that was gravitationally captured by Jupiter and destroyed by a collision several billion years ago.

However, given its mean inclination and different colour, Callirrhoe could be also an independent object, captured independently, unrelated to the collision and break-up at the origin of the group. Most of Callirrhoe 's physical properties are unknown, it to be about 9,6 km in diameter and its surface is be dark and lightred.

== Discovery and naming ==
Stack of three images taken by the VLT in July 2000, showing Callirrhoe's movement relative to background stars

Callirrhoe was imaged by Spacewatch at Kitt Peak National Observatory from 6 October through 4 November 1999. It was originally believed to be an asteroid, and was thus given the minor planet provisional designation 1999 UX_{18}. It was discovered to be in orbit around Jupiter by Tim Spahr on 18 July 2000, and then given the designation S/1999 J 1. It was the 17th confirmed moon of Jupiter.

It was named in October 2002 after Callirrhoe, daughter of the river god Achelous, one of Zeus's (Jupiter's) many conquests.

== Orbit ==
The diagram illustrates allirrhoe's orbital elements in relation to other satellites of the Pasiphae group.

The satellite orbits Jupiter at a mean distance of 23.789.400 km and completes one orbit in 724,4 days. Its orbit has an inclination of 147,3° relative to the ecliptic and an eccentricity of 0.329. The orbit is subject to continuous changes due to gravitational perturbation from the Sun and the other planets.

=== Group membership and origin ===
Callirrhoe belongs to the Pasiphae group, a group of irregular retrograde Jovian moons. Members of this group have orbits with semimajor axes ranging from approximately 22 to 25 million km, orbital inclinations between 141° and 158°, and relatively high eccentricities ranging from 0.22 to 0.44. The moons of the Pasiphae group are believed to be fragments of an asteroid or trans-Neptunian object that was gravitationally captured by Jupiter and destroyed by a collision several billion years ago.

However, given its mean inclination and different colour, Callirrhoe is sometimes considered to be of its own category and different from the other Pasiphae moons. Callirrhoe also has dissimilar spectral features from Pasiphae, further supporting a different origin.

== Physical characteristics ==
Stack of five W3 band (12 μm wavelength range) images of Jupiter's moon Callirrhoe by the Wide-Field Infrared Survey Explorer (WISE), taken on 2010.

Callirrhoe has an apparent magnitude of 20.8, making it even fainter than dwarf planet Eris at magnitude 18.7. Jupiter is about 2.1 billion times brighter than Callirrhoe. (Note: $\sqrt[5]{100^{13.92-\left(-9.4\right)}}\approx 2.13\times10^9$)

Measurements of its thermal emission yielded an estimated diameter of approximately 9,6 km and an albedo of 5,2% for Callirrhoe. The shape of the moon is currently unknown. However, given its small size, Callirrhoe is likely to have an irregular shape, similar to other irregular moons.

While Pasiphae belongs to the grey color class ( B−V=0.74, V−R=0.38), Callirrhoe falls under the light red color class (B−V=0.72, V−R=0.50), similarly to Megaclite and Sinope.

For Callirrhoe, a beaming parameter of 0.85 ± 0.17 was determined based on thermal modeling of the WISE observations. This parameter describes the influence of the thermal properties and surface characteristics on the observed thermal emission.

== Exploration ==
Callirrhoe imaged by the LORRI instrument aboard New Horizons

The New Horizons spacecraft flew through the Jovian system in early 2007, using Jupiter for a gravity assist to shorten its journey to Pluto. As a navigation exercise, New Horizons imaged Callirrhoe from a distance on 10 January 2007 using its LORRI instrument.

All Jupiter irregular moons including Callirrhoe are planned to be distant observation targets for the European Space Agency's Jupiter Icy Moons Explorer (Juice) mission, which will measure the Jupiter irregular moons' rotation periods and shapes by watching their brightness change over time.

== See also ==
- Irregular satellites
