= AP7 =

AP7 or AP-7 may refer to:

- 2022 AP7, an asteroid
- AP-7 (drug), an NMDA receptor antagonist
- Autopista AP-7, a motorway in Spain
- USS Wharton (AP-7), a 1919 US Navy troop transport and hospital ship
