= Kore (moon) =

Moon of Jupiter

- Images of Kore from the Canada–France–Hawaii Telescope on 26 February 2003

Discovery
- Discovered by: Scott S. Sheppard; David C. Jewitt; Jan T. Kleyna
- Discovery site: Mauna Kea Obs.
- Discovery date: 8 February 2003

Designations
- Designation: Jupiter XLIX (49)
- Pronunciation: /ˈkɔːriː/
- Named after: Κόρη Korē
- Alternative names: S/2003 J 14

Orbital characteristics
- Observation arc: 22 years 2025-01-07 (last obs)
- Satellite of: Jupiter
- Group: Pasiphae group

Proper orbital elements
- Proper semi-major axis: 24,203,300 km (0.161789 AU)
- Proper eccentricity: 0.338
- Proper inclination: 141.7° (to ecliptic)
- Proper orbital period: 2.11 years (769.42 d)
- Precession of perihelion long.: 18075.3138 arcsec / yr
- Precession of asc. node: 15140.1869 arcsec / yr

Physical characteristics
- Mean diameter: 2 km
- Albedo: 0.04 (assumed)
- Apparent magnitude: 23.6 (R-band)
- Absolute magnitude (H): 16.60 (31 obs)

Kore (/ˈkɔːriː/), also known as Jupiter XLIX and previously as S/2003 J 14, is a small natural satellite or moon of Jupiter. It is one of the most distant irregular moons of Jupiter, orbiting the planet at an average distance of 24.2 million km (15.0 million mi). It was discovered alongside over 20 other moons of Jupiter by Scott S. Sheppard, David C. Jewitt, and Jan T. Kleyna on 8 February 2003.

Kore is estimated to have a diameter of 2 km (1.2 mi). Like many other irregular moons of Jupiter, Kore follows a highly inclined and elliptical orbit that is retrograde or opposite to the direction of the planet's rotation. Due to Kore's immense distance from Jupiter, it is strongly perturbed by the gravitational influence of the Sun and other giant planets, which causes frequent changes in its orbit. Kore shares similar orbital properties as Jupiter's larger irregular moon Pasiphae, which makes it a member of the Pasiphae group. The moons of the Pasiphae group are believed to be fragments of an asteroid that was gravitationally captured by Jupiter and destroyed by a collision several billion years ago.

== Discovery ==
Kore was discovered by Scott S. Sheppard, David C. Jewitt, and Jan T. Kleyna on 8 February 2003, during a search for distant moons of Jupiter at Mauna Kea Observatory in Hawaii. The search involved routine imaging of the sky near Jupiter, using sensitive digital cameras equipped to the observatory's 3.6-meter (12 ft) Canada–France–Hawaii Telescope. The search by Sheppard's team ran concurrently with another team's search for Jovian moons (independently led by Brett J. Gladman), which detected Kore on 27 February 2003. The discovery of Kore was announced by the Minor Planet Center on 3 April 2003, after its orbit was determined by Brian G. Marsden. Kore was one of the 21 Jovian moons announced in 2003, which raised Jupiter's known moon count to 61 in that year.

== Name ==
When the discovery of Kore was announced, it was given the temporary provisional designation S/2003 J 14. The moon was officially named "Kore" with the Roman numeral designation Jupiter XLIX (Jupiter 49) by the International Astronomical Union's (IAU's) Working Group for Planetary System Nomenclature on 5 April 2007. The name "Kore" is another name for the Greek goddess Persephone, who was the daughter of Zeus and Demeter in Greek mythology. The name follows the IAU's naming convention for Jovian moons, which are named after mythological lovers and descendants of Zeus or Jupiter. Since Kore has a retrograde orbit, it was given a name ending with the letter "e".

== Orbit ==
Kore is an irregular moon of Jupiter, meaning it follows a very wide, inclined, and elliptical orbit around the planet. The orbit of Kore is retrograde, meaning it orbits in the opposite direction to Jupiter's rotation. The moon orbits Jupiter at an average distance of 24.2 million km (15.0 million mi; 0.162 AU), which places it far beyond the Galilean moons. Like all other irregular moons of Jupiter, Kore orbits far enough that its orbit is strongly influenced by gravitational perturbations by the Sun and other giant planets, which causes frequent changes in its orbit. For this reason, proper (or mean) orbital elements are often used to describe the general shape and orientation of the orbits of irregular moons like Kore.

On average, Kore has an orbital period of about 769 days (2.11 years) with an orbital eccentricity of 0.338 and an inclination of 141.7° with respect to the ecliptic. Simulations over a 1,000-year timescale show that Kore's orbital semi-major axis varies from 22.9 to 26.0 million km (14.2 to 16.2 million mi), while Kore's eccentricity and inclination vary from 0.061 to 0.693 and 132.5° to 151.4°, respectively. Kore's orbit exhibits nodal and apsidal precession with periods of 85.6 and 71.7 years, respectively.

On 23 November 2038, Kore will reach 0.2576 AU (38.54 million km; 23.95 million mi) from Jupiter.

Oblique view of Kore's orbit (red), with the Galilean moons (magenta) and other irregular moons of Jupiter (gray) plotted. Note that Kore's orbit does not form a closed ellipse, due to perturbations changing its orbit.

Side view of Kore's orbit (red), with the Galilean moons (magenta) and other irregular moons of Jupiter (gray) plotted

Top view of Kore's orbit (red), with the Galilean moons (magenta) and other irregular moons of Jupiter (gray) plotted

=== Group membership and origin ===
Kore shares similar orbital characteristics as Jupiter's large irregular moon Pasiphae, which makes it a member of the Pasiphae group. The moons of the Pasiphae group are believed to be fragments of an asteroid that was gravitationally captured by Jupiter and destroyed by a collision several billion years ago.

== Physical characteristics ==
Little is known about Kore's physical characteristics. Like many of Jupiter's irregular moons, Kore is very faint with an average apparent magnitude of 23.6, so it is best observed with large, sensitive telescopes. NASA estimates a diameter of 2 km (1.2 mi) for Kore, assuming it has a low albedo of 0.04. Kore is likely irregularly shaped because it is too small for its gravity to pull itself into a sphere.

== See also ==
- Moons of Jupiter
