= Orthosie =

Orthosie may refer to:

- The Greek goddess of prosperity, one of the Horae
- Orthosie (moon), a small moon of Jupiter
