= Philophrosyne (moon) =

Moon of Jupiter

Discovery
- Discovered by: Scott Sheppard et al.
- Discovery date: 2003

Designations
- Designation: Jupiter LVIII
- Pronunciation: /fɪləˈfrɒsəniː/ or /-ˈfrɒzəniː/
- Named after: Φιλοφροσύνη Philophrosynē
- Alternative names: S/2003 J 15
- Adjectives: Philophrosynean /fɪˌlɒfrəzəˈniːən/

Orbital characteristics
- Observation arc: 21 years 2024-12-03 (last obs)
- Semi-major axis: 22819950 km
- Eccentricity: 0.194
- Orbital period (sidereal): −701.3 days
- Inclination: 143.6°
- Satellite of: Jupiter
- Group: Pasiphae group

Physical characteristics
- Mean diameter: 2 km
- Apparent magnitude: 23.5
- Absolute magnitude (H): 16.60 (25 obs)

Philophrosyne (/fɪləˈfrɒsəniː/ or /fɪləˈfrɒzəniː/), also Jupiter LVIII and provisionally known as S/2003 J 15, is a natural satellite of Jupiter. It was discovered by a team of astronomers from the University of Hawaiʻi led by Scott S. Sheppard et al. in 2003, but then lost. It was recovered in 2017 and given its permanent designation that year.

== Characteristics ==
Philophrosyne is about 2 kilometres in diameter and orbits Jupiter at an average distance of 22,721,000 km in 699.676 days, at an inclination of 142° to the ecliptic (142° to Jupiter's equator), in a retrograde direction and with an eccentricity of 0.0932.

It belongs to the Pasiphae group, retrograde irregular moons that orbit Jupiter between 22.8 and 24.1 Gm, at inclinations of roughly 150–155°.

== Name ==
The moon was named in 2019 after Philophrosyne (Φιλοφροσύνη), the ancient Greek spirit of welcome, friendliness, and kindness, the daughter of Hephaestus and Aglaea and granddaughter of Zeus. The name originated from a naming contest held on Twitter where it was suggested by users including CHW3M Myth Experts (@Chw3mmyths) which is an 11th-grade history class studying Greek and Roman philosophy as of 2019, and Victoria (@CharmedScribe), and Lunartic (@iamalunartic) who has concurrently helped in naming another Jovian moon, Eupheme.
