= Megaclite =

Moon of Jupiter

- Megaclite imaged by the Canada-France-Hawaii Telescope in December 2001

Discovery
- Discovered by: Scott S. Sheppard; David C. Jewitt; Yanga R. Fernandez; Eugene A. Magnier
- Discovery site: Mauna Kea Observatory
- Discovery date: 25 November 2000

Designations
- Designation: Jupiter XIX
- Pronunciation: /mɛɡəˈklaɪtiː/
- Named after: Μεγακλειτή Megaclītē
- Alternative names: S/2000 J 8
- Adjectives: Megaclitean /ˌmɛɡəklɪˈtiːən/

Orbital characteristics
- Epoch 2026-01-01
- Observation arc: 25 years 2025-12-21 (last obs)
- Periapsis: 13.1 million km
- Apoapsis: 33.80 million km
- Semi-major axis: 23.5 million km
- Eccentricity: 0.440
- Orbital period (sidereal): –734.6 days
- Mean anomaly: 256°
- Mean motion: 0° 28^{m} 54.732^{s} / day
- Inclination: 147.7° (to ecliptic)
- Longitude of ascending node: 22.8°
- Argument of perihelion: 32.4°
- Satellite of: Jupiter
- Group: Pasiphae group

Physical characteristics
- Mean diameter: ≈ 6 km
- Albedo: 0.04 (assumed)
- Apparent magnitude: 21.7
- Absolute magnitude (H): 15.0

Megaclite /mɛɡəˈklaɪtiː/, also known as Jupiter XIX, and previously as S/2000 J 8, is a small natural satellite or moon of Jupiter. It is one of Jupiter's many irregular moons, which orbit far from the planet on highly inclined and eccentric orbits. Megaclite was discovered by Scott S. Sheppard on 23 November 2000 and was named after Megaclite.

It orbits Jupiter in the retrograde direction—opposite to the direction of the planet's rotation—at an average distance of 23.5 million km (14.6 million mi). Megaclite shares similar orbital properties as Jupiter's larger irregular moon Pasiphae, which makes it a member of the Pasiphae group.The moons of the Pasiphae group are a group moons are believed to be fragments of an asteroid or trans-Neptunian object that was gravitationally captured by Jupiter and destroyed by a collision several billion years ago.

However, given its mean inclination and different colour, Megaclite could be also an independent object, captured independently, unrelated to the collision and break-up at the origin of the group. Most of Megaclite's physical properties are unknown,it estimated to be about 6 km in diameter and its surface is be dark and lightred.

== Discovery and Naming ==
Megaclite was discovered in November 2000, along with ten other Jovian moons by a team of astronomers from the University of Hawaiʻi led by Scott S. Sheppard and given the temporary designation S/2000 J 8.

It was named in October 2002 after Megaclite, mother by Zeus (Jupiter) of Thebe and Locrus in Greek mythology. It was initially erroneously named Magaclite, which was corrected in November 2002. Despite this correction, some earlier research still referred to the moon as Magaclite.

== Orbit ==
The satellite orbits Jupiter at a mean distance of 23.640.100 km and completes one orbit in 734,6 days. Its orbit has an inclination of 148° relative to the ecliptic and an high eccentricity of 0.440. The orbit is subject to continuous changes due to gravitational perturbation from the Sun and the other planets.

=== Group membership and origin ===
Megaclite belongs to the Pasiphae group, a group of irregular retrograde Jovian moons. Members of this group have orbits with semimajor axes ranging from approximately 22 to 25 million km, orbital inclinations between 141° and 158°, and relatively high eccentricities ranging from 0.22 to 0.44. The moons of the Pasiphae group are believed to be fragments of an asteroid or trans-Neptunian object that was gravitationally captured by Jupiter and destroyed by a collision several billion years ago.

However, given its mean inclination and different colour, Megaclite is sometimes considered to be of its own category and different from the other Pasiphae moons. Megaclite also has dissimilar spectral features from Pasiphae, further supporting a different origin.

Animation of Megaclite's orbit from 1900 to 2100

Polar view

Equatorial view

Jupiter · Megaclite

== Physical characteristics ==
Due to its small size, Megaclite appears very faint from Earth with a visual apparent magnitude of around 21,7, so it can only be observed by very large, sensitive telescopes. Assuming Megaclite has a low geometric albedo of 0.04 like other irregular moons, 's diameter has been estimated to be 6 km. The shape of the moon is currently unknown. However, given its small size, it is likely to have an irregular shape, similar to other small irregular moons.

While Pasiphae belongs to the grey color class (B−V=0.74, V−R=0.38), Megaclite falls under the light red color class (B−V=0.94, V−R=0.41 ), similarly to Callirrhoe and Sinope.

== Exploration ==
Megaclite has not been imaged up close by a space probe. All Jupiter irregular moons including Megaclite are planned to be distant observation targets for the European Space Agency's Jupiter Icy Moons Explorer (Juice) mission, which will measure the Jupiter irregular moons' rotation periods and shapes by watching their brightness change over time.
