= Jupiter LIX =

Moon of Jupiter

- Precovery images of Jupiter LIX taken by the Canada–France–Hawaii Telescope in 2010

Discovery
- Discovered by: Scott S. Sheppard et al.
- Discovery date: 5 June 2017

Designations
- Designation: Jupiter LIX
- Alternative names: S/2017 J 1

Orbital characteristics
- Epoch 2026-01-01
- Observation arc: 14 years 2024-12-03 (last obs)
- Periapsis: 16.8 million km
- Apoapsis: 31.5 million km (2026-Mar-18)
- Semi-major axis: 24.1 million km
- Eccentricity: 0.305
- Orbital period (sidereal): −767 days
- Inclination: 144.7°
- Satellite of: Jupiter
- Group: Pasiphae group

Physical characteristics
- Mean diameter: 2 km
- Apparent magnitude: 23.8
- Absolute magnitude (H): 16.83 (31 obs)

Jupiter LIX, provisionally known as S/2017 J 1, is an outer irregular satellite of Jupiter on a retrograde orbit. It was reported on June 5, 2017, via a Minor Planet Electronic Circular from the Minor Planet Center. It is about 2 km in diameter.

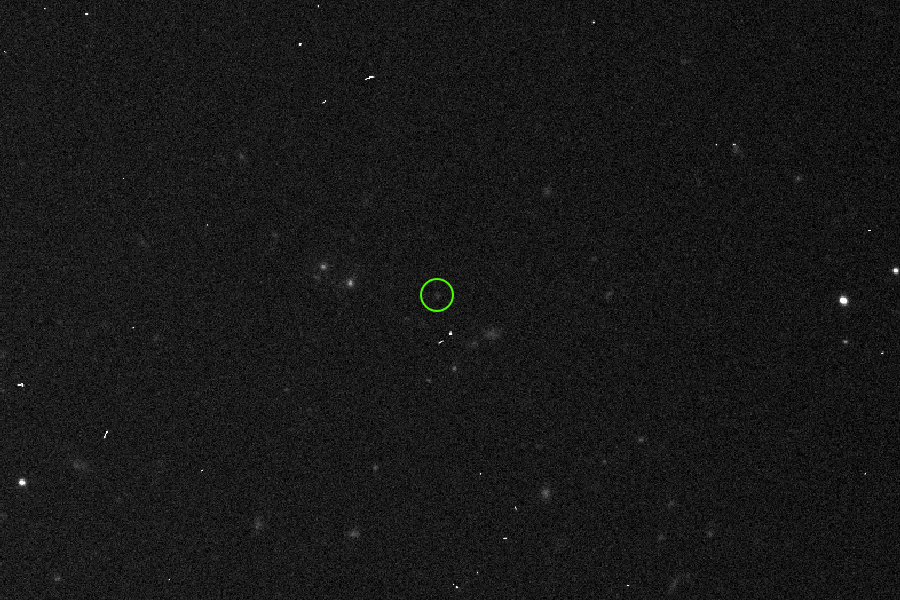
Precovery image of Jupiter LIX on 8 September 2010 (circled)

It is a member of the Pasiphae group. It has an average orbital distance of 24.1 million km, with an inclination of 144.7 degrees. Its period is 767 days. It came to apojove (farthest distance from Jupiter) on 18 March 2026 when it was 0.21 AU (31 million km; 20 million mi) from Jupiter.
