= Jupiter LIV =

Outer moon of Jupiter

- Precovery images of Jupiter LIV from the Canada-France-Hawaii Telescope in February 2003

Discovery
- Discovered by: Scott Sheppard et al.
- Discovery date: 2017

Designations
- Designation: Jupiter LIV
- Alternative names: S/2016 J 1

Orbital characteristics
- Observation arc: 20 years 2021-09-06 (last obs)
- Semi-major axis: 20650845 km
- Eccentricity: 0.141
- Orbital period (sidereal): −602.7 days
- Mean anomaly: 25.53°
- Inclination: 139.8°
- Longitude of ascending node: 293.8°
- Argument of perihelion: 328.2°
- Satellite of: Jupiter
- Group: Ananke group

Physical characteristics
- Mean diameter: 1 km
- Apparent magnitude: 24.0
- Absolute magnitude (H): 16.95 (41 obs)

Jupiter LIV, originally known as S/2016 J 1, is an outer natural satellite of Jupiter. It was discovered by Scott S. Sheppard in 2016, but not announced until June 2, 2017 via a Minor Planet Electronic Circular from the Minor Planet Center. It is about 1 kilometer in diameter and orbits at a semi-major axis of about 20,650,845 km with an inclination of about 139.8°. It belongs to the Ananke group.
