= Jupiter LXVII =

Moon of Jupiter

- Discovery images of Jupiter LXVII from the Cerro Tololo Observatory's Dark Energy Camera on 23 March 2017

Discovery
- Discovered by: Scott Sheppard et al.
- Discovery date: 2017

Designations
- Designation: Jupiter LXVII
- Alternative names: S/2017 J 6

Orbital characteristics
- Observation arc: 7 years 2024-12-03 (last obs)
- Semi-major axis: 22455000 km
- Eccentricity: 0.557
- Orbital period (sidereal): −683.0 days
- Inclination: 155.2°
- Satellite of: Jupiter
- Group: Pasiphae group

Physical characteristics
- Mean diameter: 2 km
- Apparent magnitude: 23.5
- Absolute magnitude (H): 16.43 (24 obs)

Jupiter LXVII, originally known as S/2017 J 6, is an outer natural satellite of Jupiter. It was discovered by Scott S. Sheppard and his team in 2017, but not announced until July 17, 2018, via a Minor Planet Electronic Circular from the Minor Planet Center. It is about 2 kilometers in diameter and orbits at a semi-major axis of about 22,455,000 km with an inclination of about 155.2°. It belongs to the Pasiphae group.
