= Jupiter LVI =

Moon of Jupiter

Discovery
- Discovered by: Scott S. Sheppard et al.
- Discovery date: 27 September 2011

Designations
- Designation: Jupiter LVI
- Alternative names: S/2011 J 2

Orbital characteristics
- Observation arc: 11 years 2022-09-02 (last obs)
- Semi-major axis: 23463885 km
- Eccentricity: 0.332
- Orbital period (sidereal): −730.5 days
- Inclination: 148.8°
- Satellite of: Jupiter
- Group: Pasiphae group

Physical characteristics
- Mean diameter: 1 km
- Apparent magnitude: 23.6
- Absolute magnitude (H): 16.94 (28 obs)

Jupiter LVI, provisionally known as S/2011 J 2, is a natural satellite of Jupiter. It was discovered by Scott Sheppard in 2011. Images of the newly discovered moon were captured using the Magellan-Baade telescope at the Las Campanas Observatory in Chile. It is an irregular moon with a retrograde orbit. The discovery of Jupiter LVI brought the Jovian satellite count to 67. It is one of the outer retrograde swarm of objects orbiting Jupiter and belongs to the Pasiphae group.

The moon was lost following its discovery in 2011. It was recovered in 2017 and given its permanent designation that year.
