= Hegemone (moon) =

Moon of Jupiter

Discovery
- Discovered by: Scott Sheppard et al.
- Discovery date: 2003

Designations
- Designation: Jupiter XXXIX
- Pronunciation: /həˈdʒɛməniː/
- Named after: Ἡγεμόνη Hēgemonē
- Alternative names: S/2003 J 8
- Adjectives: Hegemonean /ˌhɛdʒəməˈniːən/

Orbital characteristics
- Observation arc: 22 years 2024-12-03 (last obs)
- Semi-major axis: 23947000 km
- Eccentricity: 0.328
- Orbital period (sidereal): −739.6 days
- Inclination: 155.2°
- Satellite of: Jupiter
- Group: Pasiphae group

Physical characteristics
- Mean diameter: 3 km
- Apparent magnitude: 22.8
- Absolute magnitude (H): 15.63 (45 obs)

Hegemone /həˈdʒɛməniː/, also known as Jupiter XXXIX, is a natural satellite of Jupiter. It was discovered by a team of astronomers from the University of Hawaiʻi led by Scott S. Sheppard in 2003, and given the temporary designation S/2003 J 8.

Hegemone is about 3 kilometres in diameter, and orbits Jupiter at an average distance of 23,703,000 km in 745.500 days, at an inclination of 153° to the ecliptic (151° to Jupiter's equator), in a retrograde direction and with an eccentricity of 0.4077.

It was named in March 2005 after Hegemone, one of the Graces, and a daughter of Zeus (Jupiter).

Hegemone belongs to the Pasiphae group, irregular retrograde moons orbiting Jupiter at distances ranging between 22.8 and 24.1 million km, and with inclinations ranging between 144.5° and 158.3°.
