= Eurydome (moon) =

Moon of Jupiter

- Discovery images of Eurydome by the Canada-France-Hawaii Telescope in December 2001

Discovery
- Discovered by: Scott S. Sheppard; David C. Jewitt; Yanga R. Fernandez
- Discovery site: Mauna Kea Observatory
- Discovery date: 9 December 2001

Designations
- Designation: Jupiter XXXII
- Pronunciation: /jʊˈrɪdəmiː/
- Named after: Ευρυδόμη Eyry̆domē
- Alternative names: S/2001 J 4
- Adjectives: Eurydomean /ˌjʊrɪdəˈmiːən/

Orbital characteristics
- Epoch 17 December 2020 (JD 2459200.5)
- Observation arc: 23 years 2024-12-03 (last obs)
- Semi-major axis: 0.1551793 AU (23,214,490 km)
- Eccentricity: 0.2975371
- Orbital period (sidereal): –722.59 d
- Mean anomaly: 169.85622°
- Mean motion: 0° 29^{m} 53.536^{s} / day
- Inclination: 150.28897° (to ecliptic)
- Longitude of ascending node: 31.50527°
- Argument of perihelion: 306.06428°
- Satellite of: Jupiter
- Group: Pasiphae group

Physical characteristics
- Mean diameter: 3 km
- Albedo: 0.04 (assumed)
- Apparent magnitude: 22.7
- Absolute magnitude (H): 16.2

Eurydome /jʊˈrɪdəmiː/, also known as Jupiter XXXII, is a natural satellite of Jupiter. It was discovered concurrently with Hermippe by a team of astronomers from the University of Hawaiʻi led by Scott S. Sheppard in 2001, and given the temporary designation S/2001 J 4.

Eurydome is about 3 kilometres in diameter, and orbits Jupiter at an average distance of 23,231,000 km in 722.59 days, at an inclination of 149° to the ecliptic (147° to Jupiter's equator), in a retrograde direction and with an eccentricity of 0.3770.

It was named in August 2003 after Eurydome in Greek mythology, who is sometimes described as the mother of the Graces by Zeus (Jupiter).

Eurydome belongs to the Pasiphae group, irregular retrograde moons orbiting Jupiter at distances ranging between 22.8 and 24.1 million km, and with inclinations ranging between 144.5° and 158.3°.

Discovery image of Hermippe and Eurydome together, taken by the CFHT in December 2001
