= Thelxinoe (moon) =

Moon of Jupiter

Discovery
- Discovered by: Scott S. Sheppard et al.
- Discovery date: 2003

Designations
- Designation: Jupiter XLII
- Pronunciation: /θɛlkˈsɪnoʊ.iː/
- Named after: Θελξινόη Thelxĭnoē
- Alternative names: S/2003 J 22
- Adjectives: Thelxinoean /ˌθɛlksɪnoʊˈiːən/

Orbital characteristics
- Observation arc: 19 years 2021-09-06 (last obs)
- Semi-major axis: 21162000 km
- Eccentricity: 0.221
- Orbital period (sidereal): −628.1 days
- Mean anomaly: 194.0°
- Inclination: 151.4°
- Longitude of ascending node: 206.2°
- Argument of perihelion: 179.8°
- Satellite of: Jupiter
- Group: Ananke group

Physical characteristics
- Mean diameter: 2 km
- Apparent magnitude: 23.5
- Absolute magnitude (H): 16.30 (56 obs)

Thelxinoe /θɛlkˈsɪnoʊ.iː/, also known as Jupiter XLII, is a natural satellite of Jupiter. It was discovered by a team of astronomers from the University of Hawaiʻi led by Scott S. Sheppard in 2004 from pictures taken in 2003, and originally received the temporary designation S/2003 J 22.

Thelxinoe is about 2 kilometres in diameter, and orbits Jupiter at an average distance of 20,454 Mm in 597.607 days, at an inclination of 151° to the ecliptic (153° to Jupiter's equator), in a retrograde direction and with an eccentricity of 0.2685.

It was named in March 2005 after Thelxinoe, one of the four original Muses according to some Greek writers, and a daughter of Zeus (Jupiter) by Mnemosyne.

Thelxinoe belongs to the Ananke group, retrograde irregular moons that orbit Jupiter between 19.3 and 22.7 million km, at inclinations of roughly 150°.
