= Sponde =

Moon of Jupiter

- Discovery images of Sponde by the Canada-France-Hawaii Telescope in December 2001

Discovery
- Discovered by: Scott S. Sheppard et al.
- Discovery site: Mauna Kea Obs.
- Discovery date: 9 December 2001

Designations
- Designation: Jupiter XXXVI
- Pronunciation: /ˈspɒndiː/
- Named after: Σπονδή Spondē
- Alternative names: S/2001 J 5
- Adjectives: Spondean /spɒnˈdiːən/

Orbital characteristics
- Epoch 2026-01-01
- Observation arc: 17 years 2018-05-18 (last obs)
- Periapsis: 18.9 million km
- Apoapsis: 27.7 million km (2026-Sep-05)
- Semi-major axis: 23.3 million km
- Eccentricity: 0.189
- Orbital period (sidereal): −728.4 days
- Inclination: 146.0°
- Satellite of: Jupiter
- Group: Pasiphae group

Physical characteristics
- Mean diameter: 2 km
- Apparent magnitude: 23.0
- Absolute magnitude (H): 16.7 (20 obs)

Sponde /ˈspɒndiː/, also known as Jupiter XXXVI, is an irregular satellite of Jupiter. It was discovered by a team of astronomers from the University of Hawaiʻi led by Scott S. Sheppard in 2001, and given the temporary designation S/2001 J 5.

Sponde is about 2 kilometres in diameter, and orbits Jupiter at an average distance of 23.3 million km in 728 days, at an inclination of 146° to the ecliptic, in a retrograde direction and with an eccentricity of 0.189. The frequently changing orbit causes Sponde to next come to apojove (furthest distance from Jupiter) on 5 September 2026 when it will be 0.197 AU (29.5 million km; 18.3 million mi) from Jupiter.

It was named in August 2003 after one of the Horae (Hours), which presided over the seventh hour (libations poured after lunch). The Hours, goddesses of the time of day, but also of the seasons, were daughters of Zeus (Jupiter) and Themis. The name ends in an "e" because the orbit is retrograde.

It belongs to the Pasiphae group, irregular retrograde moons orbiting Jupiter at distances ranging between 22.8 and 24.1 million km, and with inclinations ranging between 144.5° and 158.3°.
