= Jupiter LXXIII =

Moon of Jupiter that comes after Praxidike

- Jupiter LXXIII imaged by the Canada-France-Hawaii Telescope during follow-up observations in February 2003

Discovery
- Discovered by: Scott S. Sheppard et al.
- Discovery site: Mauna Kea Obs.
- Discovery date: 5 February 2003

Designations
- Designation: Jupiter LXXIII (73)
- Alternative names: S/2003 J 2

Orbital characteristics
- Epoch 17 December 2020 (JD 2459200.5)
- Observation arc: 21 years 2022-09-02 (last obs)
- Earliest precovery date: 11 December 2001
- Semi-major axis: 0.1373976 AU (20,554,390 km)
- Eccentricity: 0.2776569
- Orbital period (sidereal): –1.65 yr (–602.02 d)
- Mean anomaly: 114.43587°
- Mean motion: 0° 35^{m} 52.742^{s} / day
- Inclination: 149.20392° (to ecliptic)
- Longitude of ascending node: 50.46976°
- Argument of perihelion: 224.95527°
- Satellite of: Jupiter
- Group: Ananke group

Physical characteristics
- Mean diameter: ≈2 km
- Albedo: 0.04 (assumed)
- Apparent magnitude: 23.2
- Absolute magnitude (H): 16.73 (59 obs)

Jupiter LXXIII, provisionally designated S/2003 J 2, is a retrograde irregular satellite of Jupiter. The moon was discovered on 5 February 2003 by a team of astronomers from the University of Hawaii led by Scott S. Sheppard and David C. Jewitt, and was later announced on 4 March 2003. It was initially thought to be Jupiter's outermost known moon until recovery observations disproved this in 2020.

Jupiter LXXIII is about 2 km (1.2 mi) in diameter, and orbits Jupiter at an average distance of about 20,600,000 kilometres (0.138 AU) in roughly 600 days, at an inclination of around 149° to the ecliptic and with an eccentricity of 0.28. The moon was initially assumed to be part of the Pasiphae group, but is now known to be part of the Ananke group after it was recovered in 2020.

Jupiter LXXIII and several bright background stars and galaxies imaged by the CFHT in April 2003

The moon was considered lost until 2020, when it was recovered by Sheppard and independently by amateur astronomer K Ly. The recovery of the moon was announced by the Minor Planet Center on 26 January 2021. On 14 April 2026, the Minor Planet Center gave the moon its Roman numeral designation Jupiter LXXIII (Jupiter 73).
