= Cyllene (moon) =

Moon of Jupiter that comes after Chaldene

Discovery
- Discovered by: Scott S. Sheppard et al.
- Discovery date: 2003

Designations
- Designation: Jupiter XLVIII
- Pronunciation: /səˈliːniː/
- Named after: Κυλλήνη Kyllēnē
- Alternative names: S/2003 J 13
- Adjectives: Cyllenean /sɪləˈniːən/ (Note: The adjective 'Cyllenean' is also used for Mercury, though rarely, as for that referent the form is normally 'Cyllenian' /səˈliːniən/.)

Orbital characteristics
- Epoch 2026-01-01
- Observation arc: 16 years 2018-04-18 (last obs)
- Periapsis: 13.9 million km
- Apoapsis: 33.83 million km
- Semi-major axis: 23.9 million km
- Eccentricity: 0.416
- Orbital period (sidereal): −754.4 days
- Inclination: 144.5°
- Satellite of: Jupiter
- Group: Pasiphae group

Physical characteristics
- Mean diameter: 2 km
- Spectral type: B–V = 0.73 ± 0.07; V–R = 0.46 ± 0.07
- Apparent magnitude: 23.2
- Absolute magnitude (H): 16.34 (28 obs)

Cyllene /səˈliːniː/, also known as Jupiter XLVIII, is an irregular satellite of Jupiter. It was discovered by a team of astronomers from the University of Hawaiʻi led by Scott S. Sheppard in 2003, receiving the temporary designation S/2003 J 13. It gets as far as 33.8 million kilometres (21,000,000 mi) from Jupiter.

Cyllene is about 2 kilometres (1.2 mi) in diameter, and orbits Jupiter at an average distance of 23.9 million kilometres (14,900,000 mi) in 754 days (2.06 yr), at an inclination of 145° to the ecliptic, in a retrograde direction and with an eccentricity of 0.416. The orbital elements are continuously changing due to solar and planetary perturbations. In October 2014, the moon reached 0.253 AU (37.8 million km; 23.5 million mi) from Jupiter, and in October 2015 approached within 0.0616 AU (9.22 million km; 5.73 million mi) of Jupiter.

It was named in March 2005 after Cyllene, a naiad (stream nymph) or oread (mountain nymph) associated with Mount Cyllene, Greece. She was a daughter of Zeus (Jupiter).

It belongs to the Pasiphae group, irregular retrograde moons orbiting Jupiter at distances ranging between 22.8 million kilometres (14,200,000 mi) and 24.1 million kilometres (15,000,000 mi), and with inclinations ranging between 144.5° and 158.3°.
