= Mneme (moon) =

Moon of Jupiter

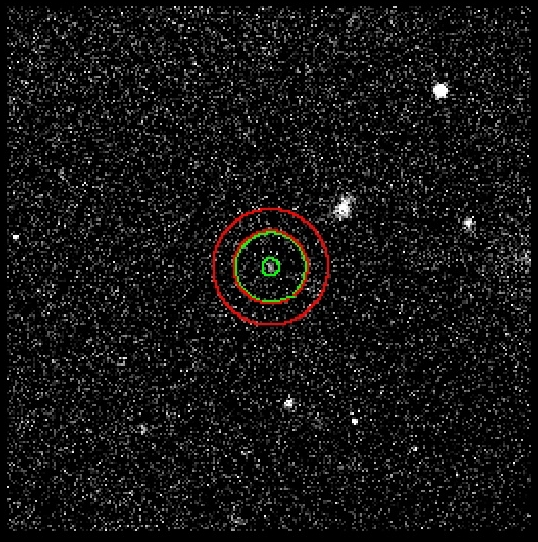
- Discovery image of Mneme (centered) from February 2003

Discovery
- Discovered by: Brett J. Gladman et al. Scott S. Sheppard et al.
- Discovery date: 9 February 2003

Designations
- Designation: Jupiter XL
- Pronunciation: /ˈniːmiː/
- Named after: Μνήμη Mnēmē
- Alternative names: S/2003 J 21
- Adjectives: Mnemean /nɛˈmiːən/

Orbital characteristics
- Observation arc: 15 years 2017-03-26 (last obs)
- Semi-major axis: 21069000 km
- Eccentricity: 0.227
- Orbital period (sidereal): −620.0 days
- Mean anomaly: 338.9°
- Inclination: 148.6°
- Longitude of ascending node: 18.1°
- Argument of perihelion: 41.7°
- Satellite of: Jupiter
- Group: Ananke group

Physical characteristics
- Mean diameter: 2 km
- Apparent magnitude: 23.3
- Absolute magnitude (H): 16.3 (44 obs)

Mneme /ˈniːmiː/, also known as Jupiter XL, is a retrograde irregular satellite of Jupiter. It was discovered by teams of astronomers led by Brett J. Gladman and Scott S. Sheppard in 2003, and was provisionally designated S/2003 J 21. Mneme has a 15 year observation arc and has not been observed since 2017.

Mneme is about 2 kilometres in diameter, and orbits Jupiter at an average distance of 21,427,000 kilometres in 640.769 days, at an inclination of 149° to the ecliptic (148° to Jupiter's equator) with an eccentricity of 0.2214. Its average orbital speed is 2.43 km/s.

It was named in March 2005 after Mneme, one of the three original Muses. She is sometimes confused with Mnemosyne, mother of the Muses (the three or the nine, depending on the author) by Zeus (Jupiter).

Mneme belongs to the Ananke group, retrograde irregular moons which orbit Jupiter between 19.3 and 22.7 million kilometres, at inclinations of roughly 150°.
