= 2022 AP7 =

Kilometer-sized Apollo asteroid

2022 AP_{7}
Discovery
- Discovered by: S. S. Sheppard
- Discovery site: Cerro Tololo Observatory
- Discovery date: 13 January 2022

Designations
- Minor planet category: NEO · Apollo · PHA

Orbital characteristics
- Epoch 9 August 2022 (JD 2459800.5)
- Uncertainty parameter 1
- Observation arc: 4.86 yr (1,774 days)
- Earliest precovery date: 20 December 2017
- Aphelion: 5.015 AU
- Perihelion: 0.833 AU
- Semi-major axis: 2.924 AU
- Eccentricity: 0.7151
- Orbital period (sidereal): 5.00 yr
- Mean anomaly: 25.857°
- Mean motion: 0° 11^{m} 49.647^{s} / day
- Inclination: 13.835°
- Longitude of ascending node: 192.377°
- Time of perihelion: 30 March 2022
- Argument of perihelion: 113.590°
- Earth MOID: 0.04716 AU (7,055,000 km; 18.35 LD)
- Mars MOID: 0.07344 AU (10,986,000 km; 28.58 LD)
- Jupiter MOID: 1.19258 AU (178.407 Gm)

Physical characteristics
- Mean diameter: 1.1–2.3 km (Note: Diameter range based on absolute magnitude of 17.1 and assumed albedo range of 0.20 to 0.05.); 1.2 km (Note: An absolute magnitude of 17.3 and assumed albedo of 0.14 gives a diameter of 1,231 m (1.231 km) (or ≈1.2 km after rounding). PHAs brighter than absolute magnitude 17.75 are likely larger than 1 km in size.)
- Absolute magnitude (H): 17.1±0.2; 17.3 (MPC)

2022 AP_{7} is a kilometer-sized Apollo asteroid and potentially hazardous object orbiting between Venus and Jupiter. It was discovered on 13 January 2022 by Scott Sheppard at Cerro Tololo Observatory. Based on its absolute magnitude (H), 2022 AP_{7} is likely the largest potentially hazardous object identified in the eight years prior to its 2022 discovery. (Note: 2014 LJ_{21} was discovered on 5 June 2014 and has an absolute magnitude of 16.05 with an estimated diameter of ≈2.2 km. Another potentially hazardous asteroid similar in size to 2022 AP_{7} is 2022 RX_{3} (absolute magnitude of 17.64) estimated to be ≈1.1 km in diameter.)

== Discovery ==
2022 AP_{7} was discovered as part of Sheppard's twilight survey for near-Earth asteroids interior to Earth and Venus, using Cerro Tololo Observatory's Dark Energy Camera. Notable discoveries from this survey include the Atira asteroids 2021 LJ4 and 2021 PH27, the latter of which holds the record for the shortest orbital period of any known asteroid as of 2022.

== Orbit and classification ==
2022 AP_{7} is considered "potentially hazardous" only because of its large size and low Earth minimum orbit intersection distance (MOID) just within 0.05 AU (7.5 million km; 19 LD). However, the asteroid does not currently make notable close approaches to Earth because it is in a 1:5 near orbital resonance with Earth, which means it nearly takes exactly 5.0 years to orbit the Sun in a highly elliptical orbit. This resonance regularly puts it in positions where observational conditions are unfavorable; the asteroid is obscured by the Sun's glare when it becomes brightest near perihelion at low solar elongations and can be fainter at opposition when it is farther from Earth. As a result, 2022 AP_{7} could only be efficiently searched at twilight when at its brightest; the asteroid was 45 degrees from the Sun and 1.9 AU from Earth when it was discovered. The asteroid made its closest approach 1.47 AU from Earth on 7 March 2022. The asteroid will not come this close to Earth again until March 2027. By May 2022, when the asteroid was 1 AU from the Sun and near the ecliptic, Earth was on the other side of the Sun, 1.9 AU from the asteroid.

The asteroid is not risk listed. 2022 AP_{7}'s orbit is well-determined and will guarantee only distant approaches beyond 1.1 AU (160 million km; 430 LD) of Jupiter over the next 146 years. The asteroid will also pass 0.16 AU (24 million km; 62 LD) from Mars on 9 May 2107. Nominally the asteroid will not approach 1 AU from Earth until April 2332. Over the next several centuries if not thousands of years, repeated perturbations by these encounters will eventually break the 1:5 near orbital resonance of 2022 AP_{7}, potentially leading to an impact with Earth.

2022 AP_{7} Closest Approaches 2022–2150 (Earth has the farthest approach)
Object	Date	Nearest approach (AU)
Mars	2107-05-09	0.16 AU (24 million km; 62 LD)
Venus	2147-04-22	0.23 AU (34 million km; 90 LD)
Mercury	2062-03-07	0.44 AU (66 million km; 170 LD)
Sun	2057-03-26	0.82 AU (123 million km; 320 LD)
Jupiter	2109-09-30	1.19 AU (178 million km; 460 LD)
Earth	2052-03-12	1.37 AU (205 million km; 530 LD)
