= Aoede (moon) =

Natural satellite of Jupiter

Discovery
- Discovered by: Scott S. Sheppard et al.
- Discovery date: 2003

Designations
- Designation: Jupiter XLI
- Pronunciation: /eɪˈiːdiː/
- Named after: Ἀοιδή Aoidē
- Alternative names: S/2003 J 7
- Adjectives: Aoedean /ˌeɪəˈdiːən/

Orbital characteristics
- Observation arc: 23 years 2025-12-21 (last obs)
- Semi-major axis: 24 million km
- Eccentricity: 0.432
- Orbital period (sidereal): −761.5 days
- Inclination: 158.3°
- Satellite of: Jupiter
- Group: Pasiphae group

Physical characteristics
- Mean diameter: 4 km; 10 km
- Albedo: 0.04 (assumed)
- Apparent magnitude: 22.5
- Absolute magnitude (H): 15.48 (MPC); 14.11±0.42

Aoede /eɪˈiːdiː/, also known as Jupiter XLI, is a natural satellite of Jupiter. It was discovered by a team of astronomers from the University of Hawaiʻi led by Scott S. Sheppard in 2003. It received the temporary designation S/2003 J 7.

Aoede is about 4 kilometres in diameter, with an estimate as high as 10 km. The 4 km Minor Planet Center estimate is based on 74 observations for the absolute magnitude (H), while the 10 km estimate is based on 6 observations.

Aoede orbits Jupiter at an average distance of 24 million km in 762 days, at an inclination of 158°, in a retrograde direction and with an eccentricity of 0.432.

It was named in March 2005 after Aœde, one of the three original Muses. Aœde was the Muse of song, and was a daughter of Zeus (Jupiter) by Mnemosyne.

Aoede belongs to the Pasiphae group, irregular retrograde moons orbiting Jupiter at distances ranging between 22.8 and 24.1 million km, and with inclinations ranging between 144.5° and 158.3°.
