= S/2003 J 23 =

Natural satellite of Jupiter

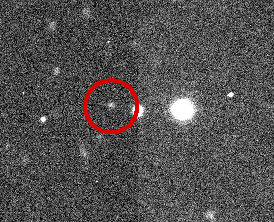
- Discovery image of S/2003 J 23 by the Canada-France-Hawaii Telescope in February 2003

Discovery
- Discovered by: Scott S. Sheppard et al.
- Discovery site: Mauna Kea Obs.
- Discovery date: 6 February 2003 (imaged); January 2004 (announced)

Orbital characteristics
- Epoch 17 December 2020 (JD 2459200.5)
- Observation arc: 22 years 2025-12-22 (last obs)
- Semi-major axis: 0.1649635 AU (24,678,190 km)
- Eccentricity: 0.3207567
- Orbital period (sidereal): –2.17 yr (–792.00 d)
- Mean anomaly: 257.08447°
- Mean motion: 0° 27^{m} 16.361^{s} / day
- Inclination: 146.15464° (to ecliptic)
- Longitude of ascending node: 142.40639°
- Argument of perihelion: 295.73090°
- Satellite of: Jupiter
- Group: Pasiphae group

Physical characteristics
- Mean diameter: ≈2 km
- Albedo: 0.04 (assumed)
- Apparent magnitude: 23.6
- Absolute magnitude (H): 16.64 (60 obs)

S/2003 J 23 is a natural satellite of Jupiter. It was discovered by a team of astronomers from the University of Hawaiʻi led by Scott S. Sheppard et al. in 2004 from pictures taken in 2003.

S/2003 J 23 is about 2 kilometres in diameter, and orbits Jupiter at an average distance of 24,700 Mm in about 792 days, at an inclination of 146° to the ecliptic, in a retrograde direction and with an eccentricity of 0.321.

It belongs to the Pasiphae group, irregular retrograde moons orbiting Jupiter at distances ranging between 22.8 and 24.1 million km, and with inclinations ranging between 144.5° and 158.3°.

Animation of discovery images taken on 6 February 2003

Recovery images of S/2003 J 23 taken by the CFHT on 24 February 2017

This moon was considered lost until late 2020, when it was recovered by Sheppard and independently by amateur astronomer K Ly. The recovery of the moon was announced by the Minor Planet Center on 13 January 2021, while additional recovery observations by Sheppard were later published on 27 January 2021.
