= S/2003 J 4 =

Moon of Jupiter

- S/2003 J 4 imaged by the Canada-France-Hawaii Telescope during follow-up observations in February 2003

Discovery
- Discovered by: Scott S. Sheppard et al.
- Discovery site: Mauna Kea Obs.
- Discovery date: 5 February 2003

Orbital characteristics
- Epoch 17 December 2020 (JD 2459200.5)
- Observation arc: 17 years 2018-05-12 (last obs)
- Earliest precovery date: 10 December 2001
- Semi-major axis: 0.1473856 AU (22,048,570 km)
- Eccentricity: 0.4967418
- Orbital period (sidereal): –1.83 yr (–668.85 d)
- Mean anomaly: 146.33793°
- Mean motion: 0° 32^{m} 17.664^{s} / day
- Inclination: 149.40138° (to ecliptic)
- Longitude of ascending node: 249.91700°
- Argument of perihelion: 240.54004°
- Satellite of: Jupiter
- Group: Pasiphae group

Physical characteristics
- Mean diameter: ≈2 km
- Albedo: 0.04 (assumed)
- Apparent magnitude: 23.0
- Absolute magnitude (H): 16.69 (46 obs)

S/2003 J 4 is a natural satellite of Jupiter. It was discovered by a team of astronomers from the University of Hawaiʻi led by Scott S. Sheppard in 2003.

S/2003 J 4 is about 2 km in diameter, and orbits Jupiter at an average distance of 23,000,000 km in 669 days, at an inclination of 149° to the ecliptic, in a retrograde direction and with an eccentricity of 0.497.

It belongs to the Pasiphae group, irregular retrograde moons orbiting Jupiter at distances ranging between 22.8 and 24.1 million km, and with inclinations ranging between 144.5° and 158.3°.

This moon was considered lost until late 2020, when it was recovered by amateur astronomers K Ly and Sam Deen in archival images from 2001–2018. The recovery of the moon was announced by the Minor Planet Center on 13 January 2021.
