= Orthosie (moon) =

Moon of Jupiter

- Discovery image of Orthosie by the Canada-France-Hawaii Telescope in December 2001

Discovery
- Discovered by: Scott S. Sheppard; David C. Jewitt; Yanga R. Fernandez
- Discovery site: Mauna Kea Observatory
- Discovery date: 11 December 2001

Designations
- Designation: Jupiter XXXV
- Pronunciation: /ɔːrˈθoʊziː/
- Named after: Ορθωσία Orthōsia
- Alternative names: S/2001 J 9
- Adjectives: Orthosian /ɔːrˈθoʊʒiən/

Orbital characteristics
- Epoch 17 December 2020 (JD 2459200.5)
- Observation arc: 24 years 2025-12-23 (last obs)
- Semi-major axis: 0.1415163 AU (21,170,540 km)
- Eccentricity: 0.4837243
- Orbital period (sidereal): –629.29 d
- Mean anomaly: 333.61997°
- Mean motion: 0° 34^{m} 19.449^{s} / day
- Inclination: 148.48740° (to ecliptic)
- Longitude of ascending node: 287.90005°
- Argument of perihelion: 261.21085°
- Satellite of: Jupiter
- Group: Ananke group

Physical characteristics
- Mean diameter: 2 km
- Albedo: 0.04 (assumed)
- Apparent magnitude: 23.1
- Absolute magnitude (H): 16.6

Orthosie /ɔːrˈθoʊziː/, also known as Jupiter XXXV, is a natural satellite of Jupiter. It was discovered by a team of astronomers from the University of Hawaiʻi led by Scott S. Sheppard in 2001, and given the temporary designation S/2001 J 9.

Orthosie is about 2 kilometres in diameter, and orbits Jupiter at an average distance of 21,075,662 km in 625.07 days, at an inclination of 146.46° to the ecliptic (143° to Jupiter's equator), in a retrograde direction and with an eccentricity of 0.3376.

It was named in August 2003 after Orthosie, the Greek goddess of prosperity and one of the Horae. The Horae (Hours) were daughters of Zeus and Themis.

Orthosie belongs to the Ananke group.
