= Jupiter LV =

Outer moon of Jupiter

- Recovery images of Jupiter LV taken by the Canada-France-Hawaii Telescope in October 2010

Discovery
- Discovered by: Brett J. Gladman
- Discovery date: 4 April 2003

Designations
- Alternative names: S/2003 J 18

Orbital characteristics
- Observation arc: 19 years 2022-09-02 (last obs)
- Semi-major axis: 20274000 km
- Eccentricity: 0.0509071
- Orbital period (sidereal): −604.99 d
- Mean anomaly: 220.7°
- Inclination: 143.5° (to ecliptic)
- Longitude of ascending node: 215.5°
- Argument of perihelion: 98.15°
- Satellite of: Jupiter
- Group: Ananke group

Physical characteristics
- Mean diameter: 2 km
- Apparent magnitude: 23.4
- Absolute magnitude (H): 16.44 (52 obs)

Jupiter LV, provisionally known as S/2003 J 18, is a natural satellite of Jupiter. It was discovered by a team of astronomers led by Brett J. Gladman in 2003.

Jupiter LV is about 2 kilometres in diameter, and orbits Jupiter at an average distance of 20.220 million km in 604.99 days, at an inclination of 143° to the ecliptic (145° to Jupiter's equator), in a retrograde direction and with an eccentricity of 0.0509.

It belongs to the Ananke group, retrograde irregular moons that orbit Jupiter between 22.8 and 24.1 million km, at inclinations of roughly 150–155°.

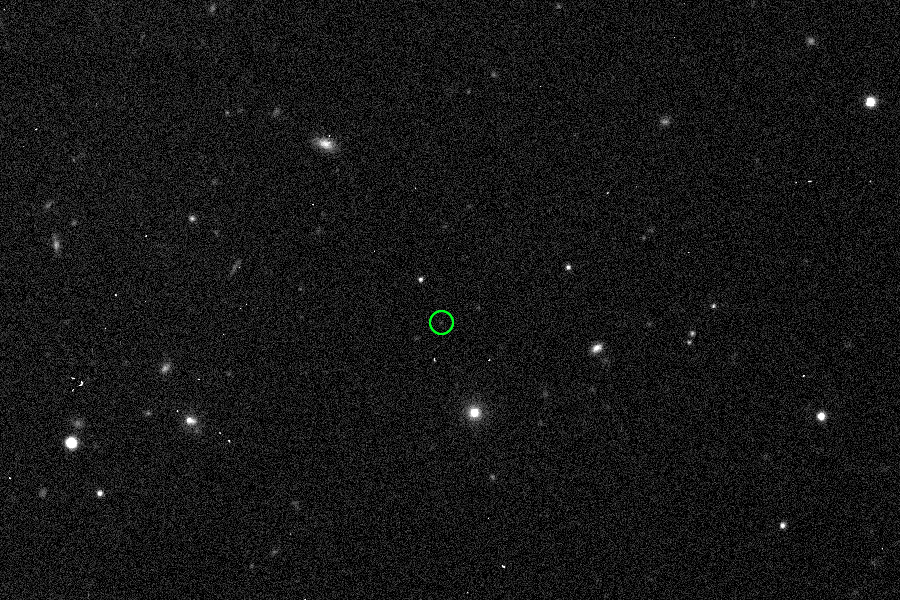
Recovery image of Jupiter LV on 30 October 2010 (circled)

The moon was lost following its discovery in 2003. It was recovered in 2017 and given its permanent designation that year.
