= Sinope (moon) =

Moon of Jupiter

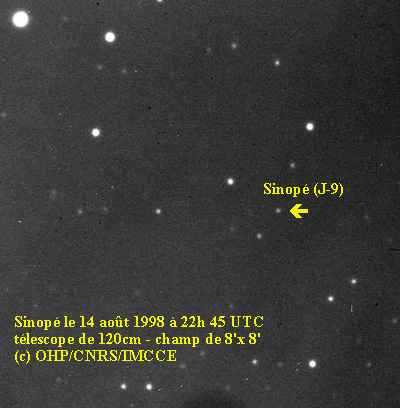
- Sinope photographed by the Haute-Provence Observatory on 14 August 1998

Discovery
- Discovered by: Seth B. Nicholson
- Discovery site: Lick Observatory
- Discovery date: 21 July 1914

Designations
- Designation: Jupiter IX
- Pronunciation: /səˈnoʊpiː/
- Named after: Σινώπη Sinōpē
- Adjectives: Sinopean /saɪnəˈpiːən/

Orbital characteristics
- Epoch 2026-01-01
- Observation arc: 103.87 yr (37,938 days)
- Periapsis: 17.3 million km
- Apoapsis: 30.0 million km
- Semi-major axis: 23.6 million km
- Eccentricity: 0.269
- Orbital period (sidereal): –741.8 days
- Mean anomaly: 1.94°
- Mean motion: 0° 27^{m} 47.33^{s} / day
- Inclination: 159.3° (to ecliptic)
- Longitude of ascending node: 47.4°
- Argument of perihelion: 79.2°
- Satellite of: Jupiter
- Group: Pasiphae group

Physical characteristics
- Mean diameter: 35.0±0.6 km
- Synodic rotation period: 13.16±0.10 h?
- Albedo: 0.042±0.006
- Spectral type: D
- Apparent magnitude: 18.3
- Absolute magnitude (H): 11.1

Sinope /səˈnoʊpiː/, also known as Jupiter IX, is a natural satellite or moon of Jupiter. Sinope is one of the outermost irregular satellites of Jupiter, which orbit far from the planet on highly inclined and eccentric orbits. Sinope was discovered by Seth Barnes Nicholson at Mount Wilson Observatory in 1914.

It orbits Jupiter in the retrograde direction—opposite to the direction of the planet's rotation—at an average distance of 23.6 million km (14.7 million mi). Sinope shares similar orbital properties as Jupiter's larger irregular moon Pasipahe, which makes it a member of the Pasiphae group.The moons of the Pasiphae group are a group moons are believed to be fragments of an asteroid or trans-Neptunian object that was gravitationally captured by Jupiter and destroyed by a collision several billion years ago.

However, given its mean inclination and different colour, Sinope could be also an independent object, captured independently, unrelated to the collision and break-up at the origin of the group. Most of Sinope 's physical properties are uncertain, but it is estimated to be around 35 km in diameter and red in appearance.

== Discovery and Naming ==
Sinope was discovered by Seth Barnes Nicholson at Lick Observatory in 1914.

It is named after Sinope of Greek mythology. Sinope did not receive its present name until 1975; before then, it was simply known as Jupiter IX. It was sometimes called "Hades" between 1955 and 1975.

== Orbit ==
The diagram illustrates Sinope's orbital elements in relation to other satellites of the Pasiphae group.

The satellite orbits Jupiter at a mean distance of 23.679.300 km and completes one orbit in 741,8 days. Its orbit has an inclination of 159,3° relative to the ecliptic and an eccentricity of 0.269. The orbit is subject to continuous changes due to gravitational perturbation from the Sun and the other planets.

Sinope is also known to be in a secular resonance with Jupiter, similar to Pasiphae. However, Sinope can drop out of this resonance and has periods of both resonant and non-resonant behaviour in time scales of 10^{7} years.

=== Group membership and origin ===
Sinope belongs to the Pasiphae group, a group of irregular retrograde Jovian moons. Members of this group have orbits with semimajor axes ranging from approximately 22 to 25 million km, orbital inclinations between 141° and 158°, and relatively high eccentricities ranging from 0.22 to 0.44. The moons of the Pasiphae group are believed to be fragments of an asteroid or trans-Neptunian object that was gravitationally captured by Jupiter and destroyed by a collision several billion years ago.

Due to its large size and relatively distinct inclination, Sinope is sometimes considered to be of its own category and different from the other Pasiphae moons. Sinope also has dissimilar spectral features from Pasiphae, further supporting a different origin.

Aoede, a small irregular moon of Jupiter, has a similar orbit to Sinope and could be a remnant of the latter.

== Physical characteristics ==
Sinope observed by the Wide-field Infrared Survey Explorer (WISE) spacecraft in 2014

Measurements of its thermal emission yielded an estimated diameter of approximately 35 km and an albedo of 4.2% for Sinope.. Sinope is one of the larger irregular Jovian moons. The shape of the moon is currently unknown. However, given its small size, Sinope is likely to have an irregular shape, similar to other irregular moons.

In the visible spectrum, Sinope appears red in color (colour indices B−V=0.84, R−V=0.46). Sinope's infrared spectrum is similar to those of D-type asteroids but different from that of Pasiphae.

Thermal modeling by WISE yielded a beaming parameter of 0.82 ± 0.02, which reflects the moon’s thermal properties and surface characteristics.

The rotation period was found to be approximately 13 hours and 9.6 minutes with a peak amplitude of about ~0.2 magnitudes. The rotation period was regarded by a later paper as uncertain due to the short observation periods.

== Exploration ==
Sinope has not been imaged up close by a space probe. All Jupiter irregular moons including Sinope are planned to be distant observation targets for the European Space Agency's Jupiter Icy Moons Explorer (Juice) mission, which will measure the Jupiter irregular moons' rotation periods and shapes by watching their brightness change over time.

== See also ==
- Sinope in fiction
- Irregular satellites
- Other irregular Jovian moons discovered by Seth Barnes Nicholson:
  - Ananke
  - Lysithea
  - Carme
