= S/2003 J 12 =

Moon of Jupiter

- S/2003 J 12 imaged by the Canada-France-Hawaii Telescope during follow-up observations in February 2003

Discovery
- Discovered by: Scott S. Sheppard et al.
- Discovery site: Mauna Kea Obs.
- Discovery date: 8 February 2003

Orbital characteristics
- Epoch 17 December 2020 (JD 2459200.5)
- Observation arc: 23 years 2024-12-03 (last obs)
- Earliest precovery date: 10 December 2001
- Semi-major axis: 0.1441046 AU (21,557,740 km)
- Eccentricity: 0.3657005
- Orbital period (sidereal): –1.77 yr (–646.64 d)
- Mean anomaly: 295.36521°
- Mean motion: 0° 33^{m} 24.215^{s} / day
- Inclination: 154.69036° (to ecliptic)
- Longitude of ascending node: 127.52296°
- Argument of perihelion: 86.84711°
- Satellite of: Jupiter
- Group: Ananke group

Physical characteristics
- Mean radius: 1.2 km
- Mass: 1.9×10^{13} kg
- Mean density: 2.6 g/cm^{3} (assumed)
- Albedo: 0.04 (assumed)
- Apparent magnitude: 23.9
- Absolute magnitude (H): 17.1 (50 obs); 16.81±0.19 (R)

S/2003 J 12 is a natural satellite of Jupiter, and is one of the smallest known natural satellites in the Solar System. It was discovered by a team of astronomers from the University of Hawaiʻi led by Scott S. Sheppard in 2003.

S/2003 J 12 is about 2.4 km (1.5 mi) in diameter, and orbits Jupiter at an average distance of 21,600 Mm in 647 days, at an inclination of 155° to the ecliptic, in a retrograde direction and with an eccentricity of 0.366. It was initially thought to be the innermost of the retrograde satellites of Jupiter, but recovery observations have shown that it is an ordinary member of the Ananke group.

Blink animation of S/2003 J 12 in CFHT precovery images from December 2001

Recovery images of S/2003 J 12 taken by the CFHT in August 2011

This moon was considered lost until late 2020, when it was recovered in archival CFHT images from 2001–2011 by amateur astronomer K Ly. The recovery of the moon was announced by the Minor Planet Center on 13 January 2021.
