= Eucleia, Euthenia, Eupheme, and Philophrosyne =

Daughters of Hephaestus and Aglaia in Greek myths

Eucleia, Euthenia, Eupheme, and Philophrosyne were, according to the fifth-century AD Greek Neoplatonist philosopher Proclus, the four daughters of Hephaestus and Aglaia:

... who render the corporeal-formed nature decorated with beauty.

— Proclus; translation by Thomas Taylor

Martin Litchfield West's includes this genealogy in his reconstruction of the Orphic Rhapsodies, calling it "a new idea". West describes these four sisters, as being among the several descendants of Zeus (such as Eunomia, Dike, Thalia, and Euphrosyne) who are "personified abstractions of an auspicious character."
