= Pasiphae group =

Group of Jupiter's moons

This diagram compares the orbital elements and relative sizes of the known members of the Pasiphae group as of April 2026. The horizontal axis illustrates their average distance from Jupiter, the vertical axis their orbital inclination, and the circles their relative sizes.

107 irregular moons of Jupiter plotted by semi-major axis and inclination as of April 2026. The Pasiphae group is shown as a diffuse cluster of gray-colored points on the left.

The Pasiphae group (or family or cluster) is a group of retrograde irregular satellites of Jupiter, named after its largest member, Pasiphae. The group is usually thought to have formed from a captured asteroid that later split into many fragments in a collision, making them a collisional family. Though the moons follow somewhat similar orbits, their orbital dispersion is still very large, and additionally the moons with measured colours show significant colour diversity, making the identification of the group and a common origin open to discussion. The International Astronomical Union (IAU) reserves names ending in -e for all retrograde moons of Jupiter, which includes all those in the Pasiphae group.

== Characteristics and origin ==
The Pasiphae group is believed to have been formed when Jupiter captured an asteroid which subsequently broke up after a collision. The original asteroid was not disturbed heavily: the original body is calculated to have been 60 km in diameter, about the same size as Pasiphae; Pasiphae retains 99% of the original body's mass. However, if Sinope belongs to the group, the ratio is much smaller, 87%.

Though the moons' orbital elements show wide variation within the group, their semi-major axes (distances from Jupiter) average around 23.4 million km (similar range as the Carme group), their inclinations around 148°, and their eccentricities around 0.34. The general position the Pasiphae group occupies in orbital element space is subject to gravitational scattering by mean-motion resonances with Jupiter's orbital period in its orbit around the Sun. This suggests that the mean-motion resonances are the explanation of the orbital dispersion, rather than happenstance.

Pasiphae and Sinope exist in a state where they are significantly affected by secular resonances. They are also two of the largest irregular moons of Jupiter, which was suggested to indicate that moons' orbits were affected in the past by some dissipative process such as gas drag. This process was dependent on their size, acting fast enough for smaller objects such that they were able to bypass the resonances, while acting slow enough for larger objects that they became captured in resonance. A later study found that other moons—Cyllene, Jupiter LVI, and Hegemone—were also close to secular resonance.

Unlike the Carme and Ananke groups, the theory of a single impact origin for the Pasiphae group is not accepted by all studies. This is because the Pasiphae group, while similar in semi-major axis, is more widely dispersed in inclination. (Note: Nesvorný 2003, concurring on the Ananke and Carme groups, lists only Megaclite for Pasiphae. However, secular resonances, known for both Pasiphae and Sinope, could shape the orbits and provide the explanation for the post-collision dispersal of the orbital elements.) It is suggested sometimes that Sinope might be not a part of the remnants of the same collision and captured independently instead. The differences in color class between the objects (grey for Pasiphae, light red for Callirrhoe and Megaclite) also suggest that the group could have a more complex origin than a single collision.

== Classification ==
For most of the late 20th century, there were only eight known irregular satellites orbiting Jupiter, half of them prograde (Himalia, Elara, Lysithea, and Leda) and half of them retrograde (Pasiphae, Carme, Sinope, and Ananke). It was thought that the progrades and retrogrades each formed their own group, with each group being associated with their own collisional family, or even that all eight satellites all shared a single collisional origin. These proposals were hard to support and were replaced by alternative theories as new moons were discovered.

Typically the Pasiphae group is simply visually identified in orbital element space, distinct from the Carme group by their inclinations and from the Ananke group by their semi-major axes. At other times only a handful of moons are selected to be grouped with Pasiphae (namely Megaclite, S/2003 J 4, and Cyllene) from assessing calculations with the dispersion of the orbital elements between moons. Sometimes there is no distinction made between the Pasiphae group or the Ananke group, and the two may be considered a single group.

Due to its large size and relatively distinct inclination, Sinope is sometimes considered to be of its own category and different from the other Pasiphae moons, along with the small moon Aoede. Sinope also has dissimilar spectral features from Pasiphae, further supporting a different origin.

== List ==
The members of the Pasiphae group are (in order by date announcement):

Name	Diameter (km)	Semi-Major Axis (km)	Period (days) (Note: Negative periods are indicative of retrograde motion.)	Notes
Pasiphae	57,8	23463200	–734.42	largest member and group prototype
Sinope	35	23679300	–744.60	red colour
Callirrhoe	9,6	23789400	–749.79	reddish colour
Megaclite	6	23640100	–752.86	reddish colour
Autonoe	4	23785200	–749.61	
Eurydome	3	22894500	–707.86	
Sponde	2	23538700	–737.95	
S/2003 J 4	2	22922300	–709.12	
Aoede	4	23773100	–749.07	
Hegemone	3	23342600	–728.77	
Cyllene	2	23650000	–743.21	has come within 9.2 million km of Jupiter
Kore	2	24203300	–769.42	can reach 38.5 million km from Jupiter
Philophrosyne	2	22600200	–694.20	
S/2003 J 23	2	23824000	–751.40	
Jupiter LVI	1	22903400	–708.29	
Jupiter LIX	2	23739600	–747.44	
Jupiter LXVII	2	23251200	–724.47	
S/2016 J 4	1	23113900	–718.04	
S/2010 J 3	1	23862900	–753.28	
S/2017 J 14	1	23412500	–732.04	
S/2017 J 15	2	23170300	–720.65	
S/2021 J 7	1	23305900	–727.01	
