= Pasiphae (moon) =

Moon of Jupiter

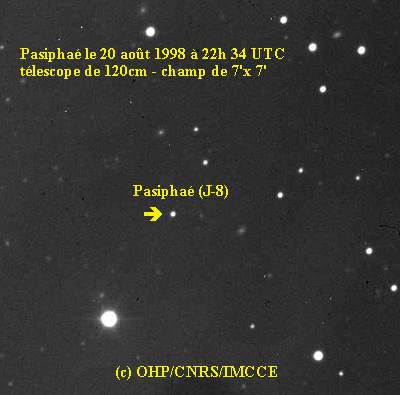
- Pasiphae photographed by the Haute-Provence Observatory in August 1998

Discovery
- Discovered by: Philibert J. Melotte
- Discovery site: Royal Observatory, Greenwich
- Discovery date: 27 January 1908

Designations
- Designation: Jupiter VIII
- Pronunciation: /pəˈsɪfeɪ.iː/
- Named after: Πασιφάη Pāsiphaē
- Alternative names: 1908 CJ
- Adjectives: Pasiphaëan /ˌpæsɪfeɪˈiːən/

Orbital characteristics
- Epoch 2026-01-01
- Observation arc: 110.34 yr (40,303 days)
- Periapsis: 12.3 million km
- Apoapsis: 35.9 million km
- Semi-major axis: 24.1 million km
- Eccentricity: 0.490
- Orbital period (sidereal): –763.7 d
- Mean anomaly: 227.2°
- Mean motion: 0° 29^{m} 54.168^{s} / day
- Inclination: 155.6° (to ecliptic)
- Longitude of ascending node: 73°
- Argument of perihelion: 268°
- Satellite of: Jupiter
- Group: Pasiphae group

Physical characteristics
- Mean diameter: 57.8±0.8 km
- Mass: 1.72×10^{17} kg (calculated)
- Mean density: 1.70 g/cm^{3} (assumed)
- Albedo: 0.044±0.006
- Spectral type: C
- Apparent magnitude: 16.9
- Absolute magnitude (H): 10.1

Pasiphae /pəˈsɪfeɪ.iː/, formerly spelled Pasiphaë, also known as Jupiter VIII, is one of the biggest retrograde irregular satellites of Jupiter. As an irregular moon with an eccentric orbit, it gets as far as 35.9 million km from Jupiter.

== Discovery and Naming ==
It was discovered in 1908 by Philibert Jacques Melotte. The moon was first spotted on a plate taken at the Royal Greenwich Observatory on the night of 28 February 1908. Inspection of previous plates found it as far back as January 27. It received the provisional designation 1908 CJ, as it was not clear whether it was an asteroid or a moon of Jupiter. The recognition of the latter case came by April 10.

Later named after the mythological Pasiphaë, wife of Minos and mother of the Minotaur from Greek legend. Pasiphae did not receive its present name until 1975; before then, it was simply known as Jupiter VIII. It was sometimes called "Poseidon" between 1955 and 1975.

== Orbit ==
Pasiphae orbits Jupiter on a high eccentricity (0.490) and high inclination (about 157°) on a retrograde orbit with an average distance of 24.1 million km, but it gets as far as 35.9 million km from Jupiter. The orbital elements are continuously changing due to solar and planetary perturbations. In December 2023 the moon reached 0.2494 AU (37.31 million km; 23.18 million mi) from Jupiter, and in November 2024 approached within 0.0666 AU (9.96 million km; 6.19 million mi) of Jupiter.

It gives its name to the Pasiphae group, a group of retrograde moons of Jupiter with semi-major axes spread over 22–25 million km, inclinations between 141° and 158°, and higher eccentricities between 0.22 and 0.44.

Pasiphae is also known to be in a secular resonance with Jupiter (tying the longitude of its perijove with the longitude of perihelion of Jupiter).

== Physical characteristics ==
Pasiphae observed by the Wide-field Infrared Survey Explorer (WISE) spacecraft in 2014

With a diameter estimated at 58 km (Albedo 4.4%), Pasiphae is the largest retrograde and third largest irregular satellite after Himalia and Elara.

Spectroscopical measurements in infrared indicate that Pasiphae is a spectrally featureless object, consistent with the suspected asteroidal origin of the object. The satellite appears pale red (colour indices V=17.22 B-V=0.74, R-V=0.38) though it falls into the grey color-class of C-type asteroids.

== Origin ==
Pasiphae probably did not form near Jupiter but was captured by Jupiter later. Pasiphae is believed to be a fragment from a captured asteroid along with other Pasiphae group satellites.

== See also ==
- Irregular satellite
