= Irregular moon =

Captured satellite following an irregular orbit

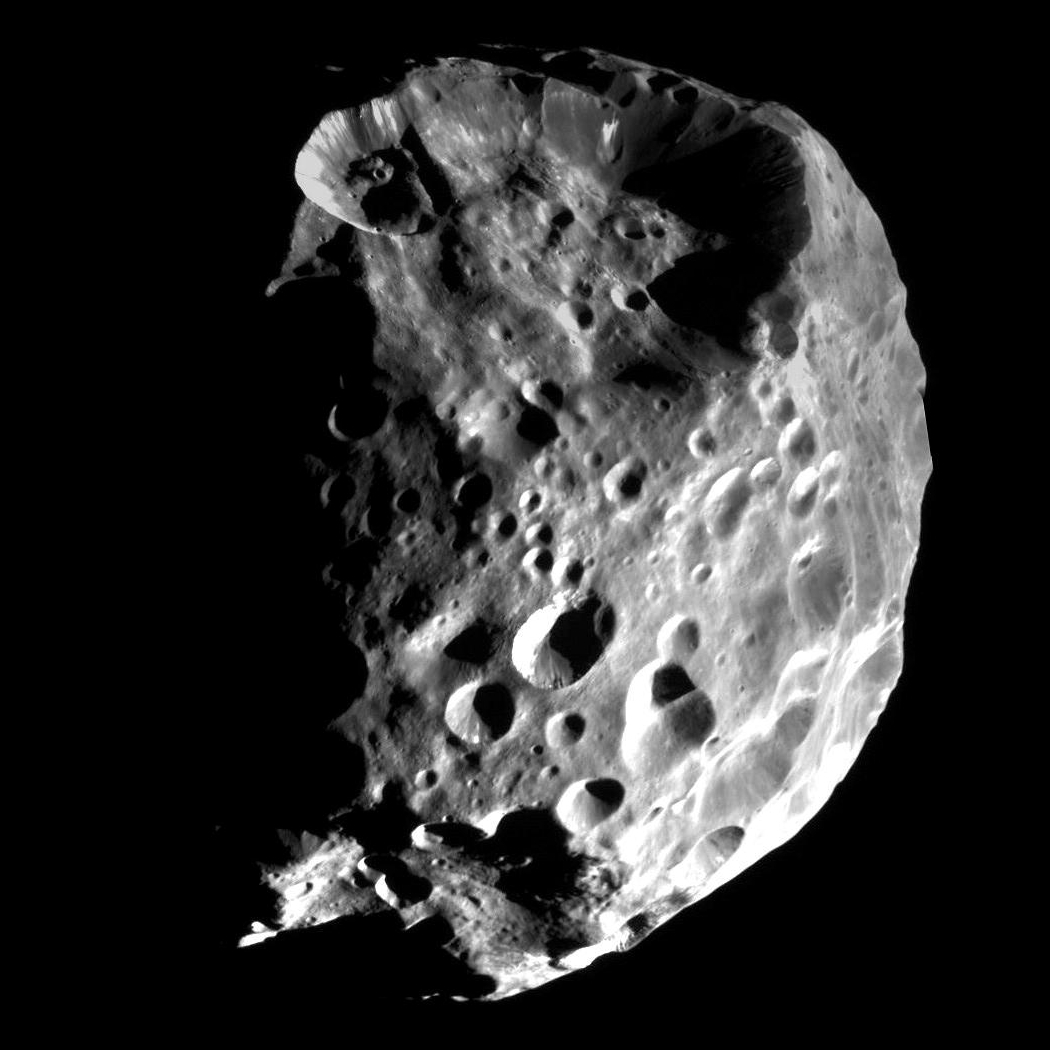
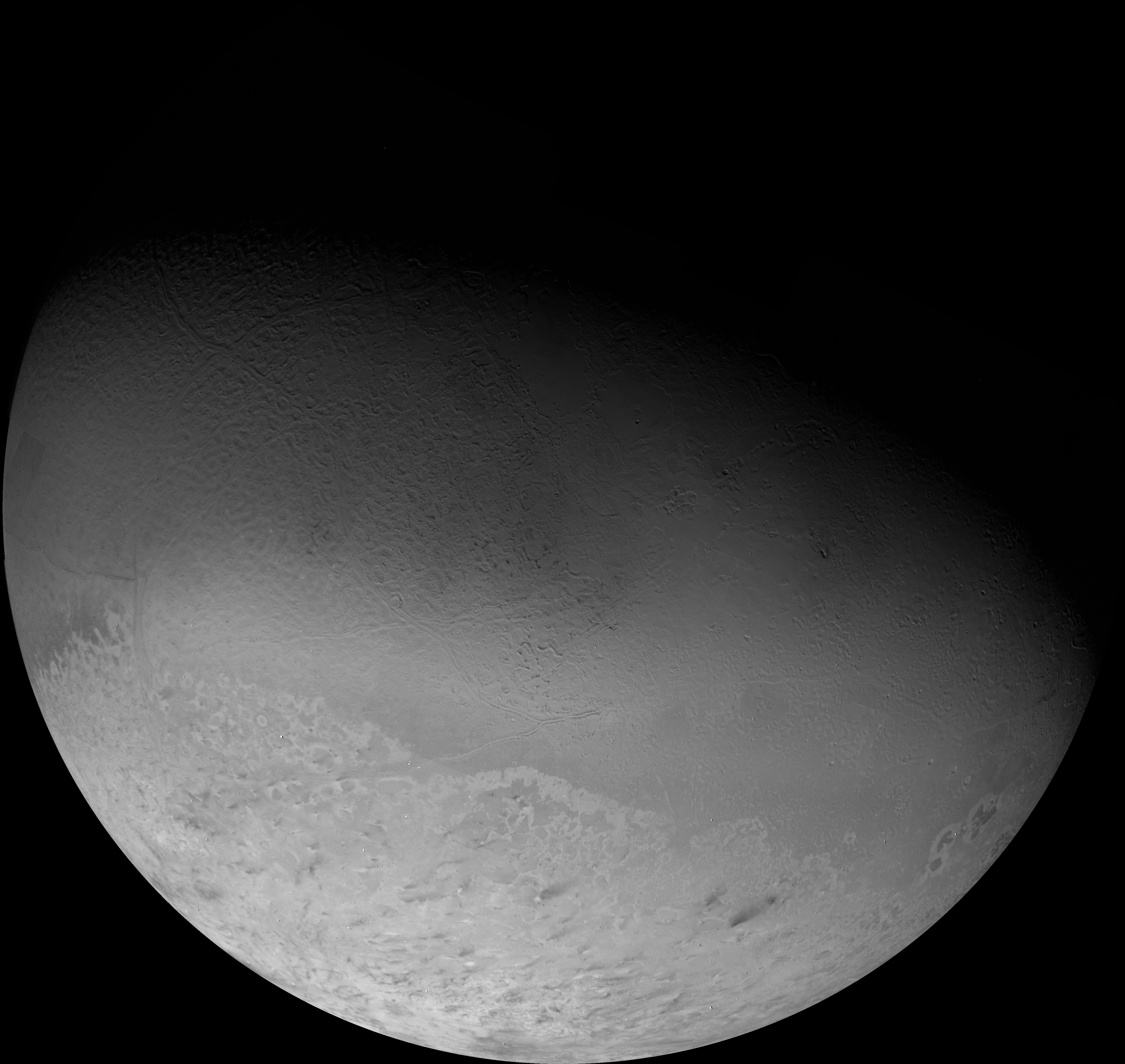
Phoebe (top) and Triton (bottom), two irregular satellites that have been visited by spacecraft

In astronomy, an irregular moon, irregular satellite, or irregular natural satellite is a natural satellite following an orbit that is irregular in some or all of the following ways: distant; inclined; highly elliptical; retrograde. They have often been captured from elsewhere by their parent planet, unlike regular satellites that formed in orbit around them. Irregular moons have a stable orbit, unlike temporary satellites which often have similarly irregular orbits but will eventually depart.

The term does not refer to shape; Triton, for example, is a round moon but is considered irregular due to its orbit and origins. Given their great distances from their parent planet, the term outer moon may also be used interchangeably. However, the outermost large moons of a planet may also be called "outer moons", such as Iapetus, Oberon, or Callisto, which might cause confusion.

Only the giant planets have irregular moons. As of April 2026, 383 irregular moons are known, orbiting all four of the outer planets (Jupiter, Saturn, Uranus, and Neptune). The largest of each planet are Himalia of Jupiter, Phoebe of Saturn, Sycorax of Uranus, and Triton of Neptune. Triton is rather unusual for an irregular moon; if it is excluded, then Nereid is the largest irregular moon around Neptune.

It is currently thought that the irregular satellites were once independent objects orbiting the Sun before being captured by a nearby planet, early in the history of the Solar System.

== Definition ==
Planet	Hill radius r_{H} (10^{6} km)	r_{H} (°)	Number known	Farthest known satellite (10^{6} km)
Jupiter	51	4.7	107	24.2 (0.47r_{H})
Saturn	69	3.0	268	28.0 (0.41r_{H})
Uranus	73	1.5	10	20.4 (0.28r_{H})
Neptune	116	1.5	9 (including Triton)	50.7 (0.44r_{H})

There is no widely accepted precise definition of an irregular satellite. Informally, satellites are considered irregular if they are far enough from the planet that the precession of their orbital plane is primarily controlled by the Sun, other planets, or other moons.

In practice, the satellite's semi-major axis is compared with the radius of the planet's Hill sphere (that is, the sphere of its gravitational influence), $r_H$. Irregular satellites have semi-major axes greater than 0.05 $r_H$ with apoapses extending as far as to 0.65 $r_H$. The radius of the Hill sphere is given in the adjacent table: Uranus and Neptune have larger Hill sphere radii than Jupiter and Saturn, despite being less massive, because they are farther from the Sun. However, no known irregular satellite has a semi-major axis exceeding 0.47 $r_H$.

Earth's Moon seems to be an exception: it is not usually listed as an irregular satellite even though its precession is primarily controlled by the Sun and its semi-major axis is greater than 0.05 of the radius of Earth's Hill sphere. On the other hand, Neptune's Triton, which is probably a captured object, is usually listed as irregular despite being within 0.05 of the radius of Neptune's Hill sphere, so that Triton's precession is primarily controlled by Neptune's oblateness instead of by the Sun. Neptune's Nereid and Saturn's Iapetus have semi-major axes close to 0.05 of the radius of their parent planets' Hill spheres: Nereid (with a very eccentric orbit) is usually listed as irregular, but not Iapetus.

== Origin and evolution ==
=== Source population ===
Unlike regular satellites, the irregular satellites have orbits that are too distant, eccentric, and inclined to have formed in the circumplanetary disk around their planets, so it is generally accepted that irregular satellites were captured from heliocentric orbits. Before they were captured in orbit around a planet, the irregular satellites were initially part of some group of objects directly orbiting the Sun. The Nice model suggests that this original population was the protoplanetary disk at distances beyond Neptune. This trans-Neptunian planetesimal disk was originally much larger and more massive, stretching between 24–50 AU, with a mass of several tens of times that of Earth. 99.9% of it was lost due to the gravitational effects of Neptune when it entered the region due to planetary migration.

A portion of these objects were dispersed inward and found themselves trapped under the gravitational influence of the giant planets, becoming the irregular satellites and the Jupiter and Neptune trojans. Other objects migrated into the main asteroid belt and the Hilda group, becoming the P and D-type asteroids. Still others were ejected into the Oort cloud, while the surviving population remains as the hot population of the Kuiper belt. Because these groups of small bodies are purported to come from the same source population, they should all share similar physical characteristics.

=== Capture ===
A planet cannot capture an object directly from heliocentric orbit without some external mechanism; an object can be captured temporarily but has the energy to eventually escape. For it to enter permanent orbit around the planet, the object must be slowed down in some way while it is close enough. In modern times, there is no mechanism available for a planet to capture a moon, so their captures must have occurred much earlier in the Solar System's history.

The prevailing theory today is n-body capture, gravitational interactions between three or more bodies that slows an object down enough such that it becomes captured. The Nice model predicts that many small bodies were scattered inward from the Kuiper belt region. When one made an approach to two giant planets in close proximity to each other, the small body could be captured in a permanent orbit around one of the planets. When the planets later moved away and their orbits stabilized, the object would remain bound.

There are variants of this theory. A close encounter between an incoming binary object and the planet (or possibly an existing moon) could result in one component of the binary being captured. Such a route has been suggested as most likely for Triton. Another theory floats the idea of trans-Neptunian objects being injected due to a close passing star and a fraction of these injected TNOs captured by the giant planets.

Historically there were other capture models proposed. In the gas drag scenario, moons that initially are in temporary capture have their speed slowed down by friction and drag with the primordial gas cloud around planets during planet formation. This would slow them down enough such that their orbits become permanent. Another proposal was "pull-down", where a planet undergoes a sudden increase of mass, pulling in nearby material and undergoing runaway growth. This would increase the planet's gravitational influence, such that unbound objects passing nearby would find themselves permanently captured. Another idea is that a collision (or close encounter) happens between an incoming body and a satellite, resulting in the incoming body losing energy and being captured.

However, the gas drag and pull-down theories cannot explain the irregular satellites of the ice giants, as they were expected not to have the required significant gas envelopes and did not undergo runaway growth phases. Another problem is that after planetary formation, the planetary migration that later occurred would have destabilized any previously captured objects. There may have been previous generations of irregular moons captured by different ways, but the irregular moons existing today were likely captured relatively late, in a gas-free environment.

=== Collisional history ===
The irregular moons were captured into a relatively small amount of orbital space, making collisions unavoidable over the history of the Solar System. The total irregular moon population may have been much larger when initially captured, then ground down through many collisions, losing up to 99% of their starting mass. This may produce large quantities of dust that may spread onto the surfaces of large regular moons.

Many of the irregular moons that exist today are expected to be collisional fragments of an originally larger body. When one suffers a collision, it may fragment into many more irregular moons, forming a collisional family. The fragments usually end up following similar orbits to that of the original, allowing for the identification of these families.

== Orbits ==
=== Current distribution ===
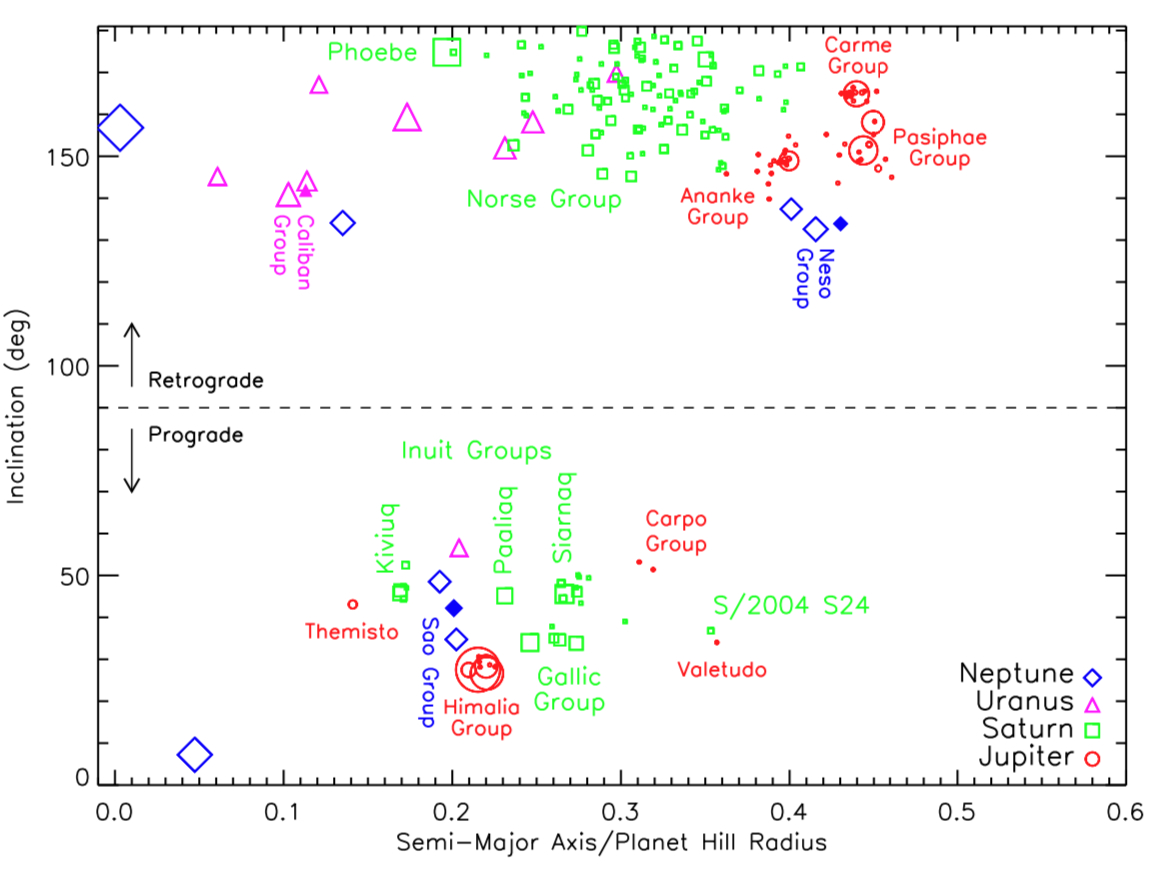
Irregular satellites of Jupiter (red circles), Saturn (green squares), Uranus (magenta triangles) and Neptune (blue diamonds) (including Triton at the top left). The horizontal axis shows their distance from the planet (semi-major axis) expressed as a fraction of the planet's Hill sphere's radius. The vertical axis shows their orbital inclination. Points or circles represent their relative sizes. Data as of February 2024.

The orbits of the known irregular satellites are extremely diverse, but there are certain patterns. Retrograde orbits are far more common (83%) than prograde orbits. No satellites are known with orbital inclinations between 60° and 130°; moreover, apart from Nereid, no irregular moon has inclination less than 26°, and inclinations greater than 170° are only found in Saturn's system. In addition, some groupings can be identified, in which one large satellite shares a similar orbit with a few smaller ones.

Given their distance from the planet, the orbits of the outer satellites are highly perturbed by the Sun and their orbital elements change widely over short intervals. The semi-major axis of Pasiphae, for example, changes as much as 1.5 million km in two years (single orbit), the inclination around 10°, and the eccentricity as much as 0.4 in 24 years (twice Jupiter's orbit period). Consequently, mean orbital elements (averaged over time) are used to identify the groupings rather than osculating elements at the given date. (Similarly, the proper orbital elements are used to determine the families of asteroids.)

=== Long-term stability ===
The current orbits of the irregular moons are stable, in spite of substantial perturbations near the apocenter. The cause of this stability in a number of irregulars is the fact that they orbit with a secular or Kozai resonance.

In addition, simulations indicate the following conclusions:

- Orbits with inclinations between 50° and 130° are very unstable: their eccentricity increases quickly resulting in the satellite being lost
- Retrograde orbits are more stable than prograde (stable retrograde orbits can be found further from the planet)

Increasing eccentricity results in smaller pericenters and large apocenters. The satellites enter the zone of the regular (larger) moons and are lost or ejected via collision and close encounters. Alternatively, the increasing perturbations by the Sun at the growing apocenters push them beyond the Hill sphere.

Retrograde satellites can be found further from the planet than prograde ones. Detailed numerical integrations have shown this asymmetry. The limits are a complicated function of the inclination and eccentricity, but in general, prograde orbits with semi-major axes up to 0.47 r_{H} (Hill sphere radius) can be stable, whereas for retrograde orbits stability can extend out to 0.67 r_{H}.

The boundary for the semimajor axis is surprisingly sharp for the prograde satellites. A satellite on a prograde, circular orbit (inclination=0°) placed at 0.5 r_{H} would leave Jupiter in as little as forty years. The effect can be explained by so-called evection resonance. The apocenter of the satellite, where the planet's grip on the moon is at its weakest, gets locked in resonance with the position of the Sun. The effects of the perturbation accumulate at each passage pushing the satellite even further outwards.

The asymmetry between the prograde and retrograde satellites can be explained very intuitively by the Coriolis acceleration in the frame rotating with the planet. For the prograde satellites the acceleration points outward and for the retrograde it points inward, stabilising the satellite.

== Physical characteristics ==
View chart definition.
Comparative masses of the largest irregular moons and Jupiter's largest inner moon Amalthea (for comparison). Values are ×10^{18} kg. One at each outer planet is > 1×10^{18} kg. Sycorax and Nereid are estimated, not measured; Nereid may not be a captured body. Mars's moons Phobos and Deimos would not be visible at this scale while Triton would dominate.

=== Size distributions ===
The power law for the size distribution of objects in the Kuiper belt, where q ≈ 4 and thus N ~ D^{−3}. That is, for every Kuiper belt object of a particular size, there are approximately 8 times as many objects half that size and a thousands times as many objects one-tenth that size.

Because objects of a given size are more difficult to see the greater their distance from Earth, the known irregular satellites of Uranus and Neptune are larger than those of Jupiter and Saturn; smaller ones probably exist but have not yet been observed. Bearing this observational bias in mind, the size distribution of irregular satellites appears to be similar for all four giant planets.

The size distribution of asteroids and many similar populations can be expressed as a power law: there are many more small objects than large ones, and the smaller the size, the more numerous the object. The mathematical relation expressing the number of objects, $N\,\!$, with a diameter smaller than a particular size, $D\,\!$, is approximated as:

$\frac{d N}{d D} \sim D^{-q}$ with q defining the slope.

The value of q is determined through observation.

For irregular moons, a shallow power law (q ≃ 2) is observed for sizes of 10 to 100 km, (Note: For every object of 100 km, ten objects of 10 km can be found.) but a steeper law (q ≃ 3.5) is observed for objects smaller than 10 km. An analysis of images taken by the Canada–France–Hawaii Telescope in 2010 shows that the power law for Jupiter's population of small retrograde satellites, down to a detection limit of ≈ 400 m, is relatively shallow, at q ≃ 2.5. Thus it can be extrapolated that Jupiter should have 600+600
−300 moons 400 m in diameter or greater.

For comparison, the distribution of large Kuiper belt objects is much steeper (q ≈ 4). That is, for every object of 1000 km there are a thousand objects with a diameter of 100 km, though it's unknown how far this distribution extends. The size distribution of a population may provide insights into its origin, whether through capture, collision and break-up, or accretion.

Around each giant planet, there is one irregular satellite that dominates, by having over three-quarters the mass of the entire irregular satellite system: Jupiter's Himalia (about 75%), Saturn's Phoebe (about 98%), Uranus's Sycorax (about 90%), and Neptune's Nereid (about 98%). Nereid also dominates among irregular satellites taken altogether, having about two-thirds the mass of all irregular moons combined. Phoebe makes up about 17%, Sycorax about 7%, and Himalia about 5%: the remaining moons add up to about 4%. (In this discussion, Triton is not included.)

=== Shapes ===
Other than Triton, the irregular satellites are expected to all have irregular shapes due to them being too small for gravity to pull themselves into a sphere. A study found no difference between the average shapes of the asteroids and the irregular moons. Similar to the asteroids, the shapes of the irregular moons are inferred to be the result of a history of collisions.

=== Colours ===
This diagram illustrates the differences of colour in the irregular satellites of Jupiter (red labels), Saturn (yellow) and Uranus (green). Only irregulars with known colour indices are shown. For reference, the centaur Pholus and three classical Kuiper belt objects are also plotted (grey labels, size not to scale). For comparison, see also colours of centaurs and KBOs.

The colours of irregular satellites can be studied via colour indices: simple measures of differences of the apparent magnitude of an object through blue (B), visible i.e. green-yellow (V), and red (R) filters. Irregular satellites share similar colours with C, P and D-type asteroids, which are prevalent in the outer main belt as well as the Hilda group and Jupiter trojan asteroids. They are also similar to dead comets. The observed colours vary from neutral (greyish) to reddish, but not as red as the "ultra red" colours of some Kuiper belt objects. This difference in colour means that if irregular satellites are to originate from the Kuiper belt, some modification to their surface colours must have happened. The lack of ultra red colour at Uranus and Neptune suggests that the colour change could not have been thermally driven.

Astronomers may assign irregular moons into spectral groups based on their spectral or colour characteristics, using both the system used for asteroids and the trans-Neptunian objects. This does not necessarily imply any further information on their origin and is simply used to denote similar characteristics.

albedo (Note: Based on the definitions from Oxford Dictionary of Astronomy, ISBN 0-19-211596-0)	neutral	reddish	red
low	C _{3–8%}	P _{2–6%}	D _{2–5%}
medium		M _{10–18%}	A _{13–35%}
high		E _{25–60%}	

Each planet's system displays slightly different characteristics, but are overall similar to each other and does not change much from planet to planet. Jupiter's irregulars are grey to slightly red, consistent with C, P and D-type asteroids. Some groups of satellites are observed to display similar colours (see later sections). Saturn's irregulars are slightly redder than those of Jupiter. The large Uranian irregular satellites (Sycorax and Caliban) are light red, whereas the smaller Prospero and Setebos are grey, as are the Neptunian satellites Nereid and Halimede.

=== Spectra ===
With the current resolution, the visible and near-infrared spectra of most satellites appear featureless. So far, water ice has been inferred on Phoebe and Nereid and features attributed to aqueous alteration were found on Himalia.

=== Rotations ===
Regular satellites are usually tidally locked (that is, their orbit is synchronous with their rotation so that they only show one face toward their parent planet). In contrast, tidal forces on the irregular satellites are negligible given their distance from the planet, and rotation periods in the range of only ten hours have been measured for the biggest moons Himalia, Phoebe, Sycorax, and Nereid (to compare with their orbital periods of hundreds of days). Such rotation rates are in the same range that is typical for asteroids. Triton, being much larger and closer to its parent planet, is tidally locked.

== Families with a common origin ==
Some irregular satellites appear to orbit in 'groups', in which several satellites share similar orbits. The leading hypothesis is that these objects constitute collisional families, parts of a larger body that broke up.

=== Dynamic groupings ===
Simple collision models can be used to estimate the possible dispersion of the orbital parameters given a velocity impulse Δv. Applying these models to the known orbital parameters makes it possible to estimate the Δv necessary to create the observed dispersion. A Δv of tens of meters per seconds (5–50 m/s) could result from a break-up. Dynamical groupings of irregular satellites can be identified using these criteria and the likelihood of the common origin from a break-up evaluated.

When the dispersion of the orbits is too wide (i.e. it would require Δv in the order of hundreds of m/s):

- either more than one collision must be assumed, i.e. the cluster should be further subdivided into groups
- or significant post-collision changes, for example resulting from resonances, must be postulated.

Resonances could further modify the orbits making these groupings less recognizable.

=== Colour groupings ===
When the colours and spectra of the satellites are known, the homogeneity of these data for all the members of a given grouping is a substantial argument for a common origin. However, lack of precision in the available data often makes it difficult to draw statistically significant conclusions. In addition, the observed colours are not necessarily representative of the bulk composition of the satellite.

It is also possible that space weathering modifies the colours of different objects to be more similar than they would otherwise.

== Observed groupings ==
=== Irregular satellites of Jupiter ===
107 irregular moons of Jupiter plotted by semi-major axis and inclination as of April 2026.

Typically, the following groupings are listed (dynamically tight groups displaying homogenous colours are listed in bold)

- Prograde satellites
  - The **Himalia group** shares an average inclination of 28°. They are confined dynamically (Δv ≈ 150 m/s). They are homogenous at visible wavelengths (having neutral colours similar to those of C-type asteroids) and at near infrared wavelengths.
  - The known members of the Carpo Group have a relatively high average orbital inclination of 51.75°.
  - The prograde satellites Themisto and Valetudo are not part of any known group.
- Retrograde satellites
  - The **Carme group** shares an average inclination of 165°. It is dynamically tight (5 < Δv < 50 m/s). It is very homogenous in colour, each member displaying light red colouring consistent with a D-type asteroid progenitor.
  - The **Ananke group** shares an average inclination of 148°. It shows little dispersion of orbital parameters (15 < Δv < 80 m/s). Ananke itself appears light red but the other group members are grey.
  - The Pasiphae group is very dispersed. Pasiphae itself appears to be grey, whereas other members (Callirrhoe, Megaclite) are light red.

Sinope, sometimes included into the Pasiphae group, is red and given the difference in inclination, it could be captured independently. Pasiphae and Sinope are also trapped in secular resonances with Jupiter.

=== Irregular satellites of Saturn ===
268 irregular moons of Saturn plotted by semi-major axis and inclination as of April 2026.

The following groupings are commonly listed for Saturn's satellites:

- Prograde satellites
  - The **Gallic group** shares an average inclination of 34°. Their orbits are dynamically tight (Δv ≈ 50 m/s), and they are light red in colour; the colouring is homogenous at both visible and near infra-red wavelengths.
  - The Inuit group shares an average inclination of 46°. Their orbits are widely dispersed (Δv ≈ 350 m/s) but they are physically homogenous, sharing a light red colouring. The Inuit group is further split into three distinct subgroups at different semi-major axes, and are named after their respective largest members.
    - The Kiviuq subgroup orbits Saturn at an average distance of 188 Saturn radii.
    - The Siarnaq subgroup orbits Saturn at an average distance of 249 Saturn radii.
    - Paaliaq is by itself and orbits at a distance in between the two other subgroups.
- Retrograde satellites
  - The Norse group is defined mostly for naming purposes; the orbital parameters are very widely dispersed. Although the Norse group does not exhibit any obvious clustering of its orbital elements, researchers led by Edward Ashton have proposed dividing the Norse group into four distinct subgroups based on inclination. These subgroups still exhibit a wide range of orbital semimajor axes, inclinations, and eccentricities, and may not necessarily share a common collisional origin.
    - The Phoebe subgroup made up of moons with inclinations greater than 172°.
    - The Mundilfari subgroup, made up of moons with inclinations between 157° and 172°.
    - The Kari subgroup, made up of moons with inclinations between 151.7° and 157°.

The remaining moons were denoted the low-inclination moons, but not a group per se, with inclinations less than 151.7°.

=== Irregular satellites of Uranus and Neptune ===
All named irregular satellites of Uranus (green) and Neptune (blue) (excluding Triton). Data as of 2006.

Planet	r_{min}
Jupiter	1.5 km
Saturn	3 km
Uranus	7 km
Neptune	16 km

According to current knowledge, the number of irregular satellites orbiting Uranus and Neptune is smaller than that of Jupiter and Saturn. However, it is thought that this is simply a result of observational difficulties due to the greater distance of Uranus and Neptune. The table at right shows the minimum radius (r_{min}) of satellites that can be detected with current technology, assuming an albedo of 0.04; thus, there are almost certainly small Uranian and Neptunian moons that cannot yet be seen.

Due to the small number of known irregular moons of Uranus, it remains unclear to what extent they can be divided into groups with similar orbital characteristics. However, one such group has now been identified:

- The Caliban group shares an average inclination of 144°

Two groups have now been identified among Neptune's irregular moons:

- The Sao group shares an average inclination of 44.5°.
- The Neso group shares an average inclination of 130°.

Given the similar (grey) colours, it was also suggested that Halimede could be a fragment of Nereid. The two satellites have had a very high probability (41%) of collision over the age of the Solar System.

== Exploration ==
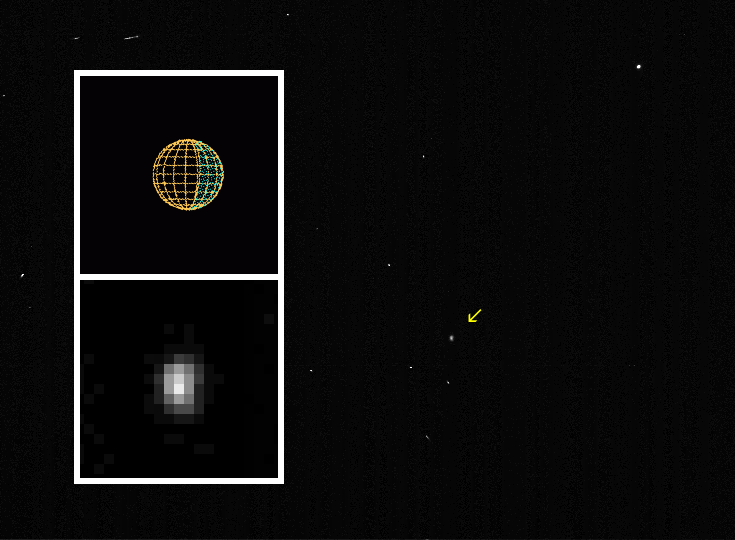
Distant Cassini image of Himalia

To date, the only irregular satellites to have been visited close-up by a spacecraft are Triton and Phoebe, the largest of Neptune's and Saturn's irregulars respectively. Triton was imaged by Voyager 2 in 1989 and Phoebe by the Cassini probe in 2004. Voyager 2 also captured a distant image of Neptune's Nereid in 1989, and Cassini captured a distant, low-resolution image of Jupiter's Himalia in 2000. New Horizons captured low-resolution images of Jupiter's Himalia, Elara, and Callirrhoe in 2007. Throughout the Cassini mission, many Saturnian irregulars were observed from a distance: Albiorix, Bebhionn, Bergelmir, Bestla, Erriapus, Fornjot, Greip, Hati, Hyrrokkin, Ijiraq, Kari, Kiviuq, Loge, Mundilfari, Narvi, Paaliaq, Siarnaq, Skathi, Skoll, Suttungr, Tarqeq, Tarvos, Thrymr, and Ymir.

The Jupiter Icy Moons Explorer (Juice), which was launched on 14 April 2023 to explore Jupiter and its largest icy moons, Ganymede, Callisto, and Europa, is also expected to conduct remote observations of Jupiter's irregular satellites. On 7 October 2031, its reference trajectory is expected to take it approximately 960,000 km from the irregular moon Kallichore although a closer flyby is currently being investigated.

The Tianwen-4 mission (to launch 2029) is planned to focus on the regular moon Callisto around Jupiter, but it may fly-by several irregular Jovian satellites before settling into Callistonian orbit.

== Gallery ==
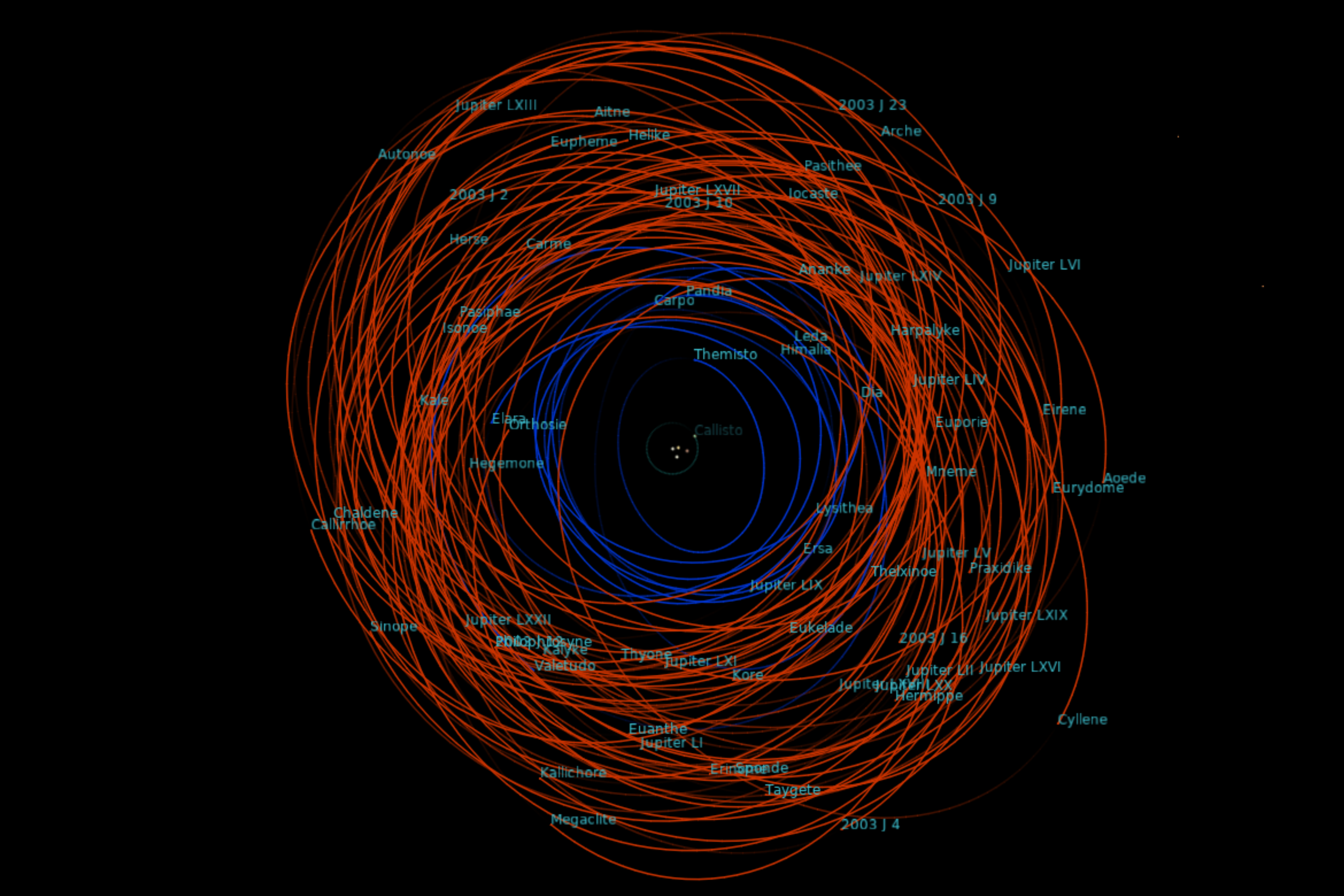
71 irregular moons of Jupiter (with Callisto for comparison; the other Galileans are also visible near the centre, though not labelled explicitly). Data as of 2021.

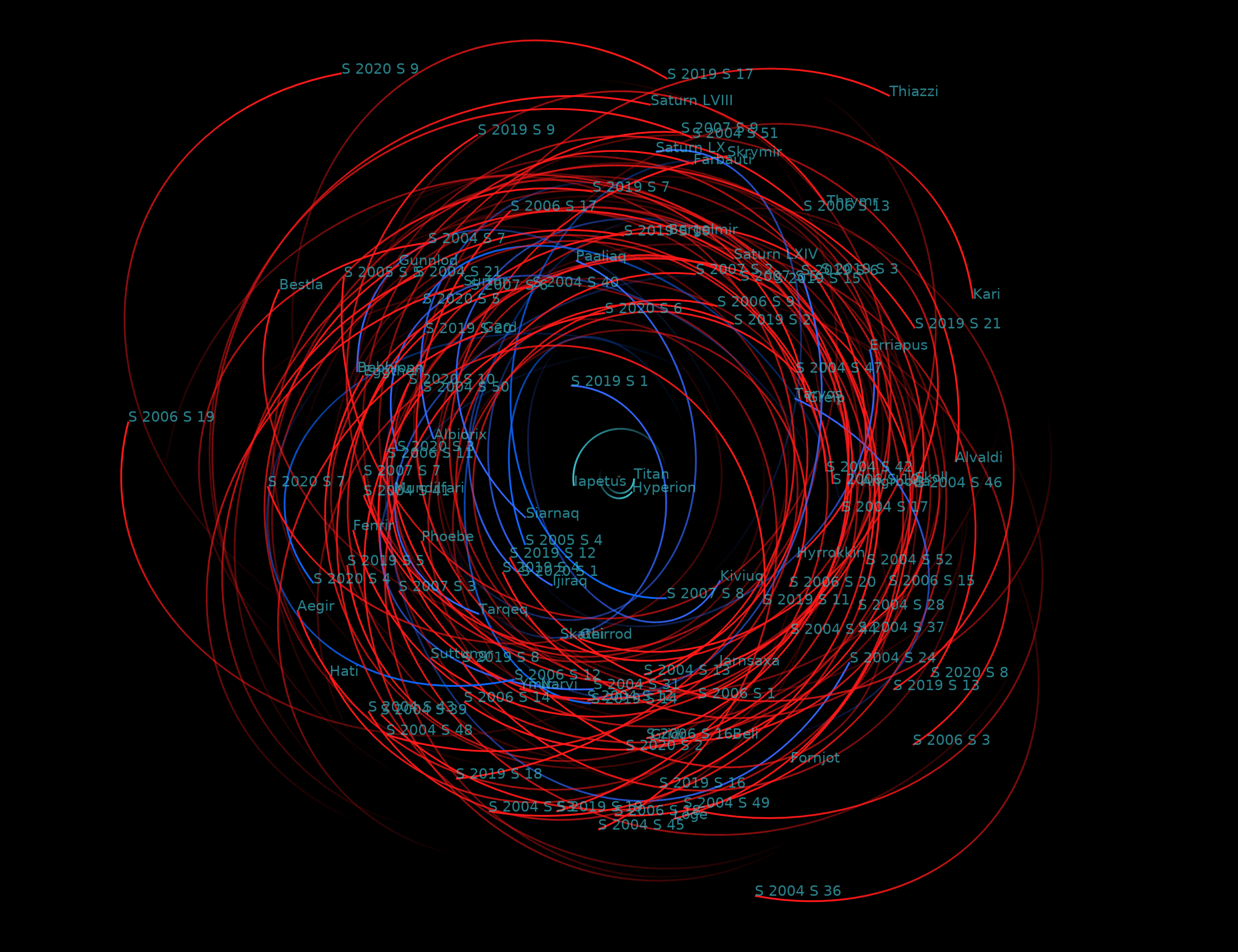
122 irregular moons of Saturn (with Titan, Hyperion, and Iapetus for comparison). Data as of 2023.

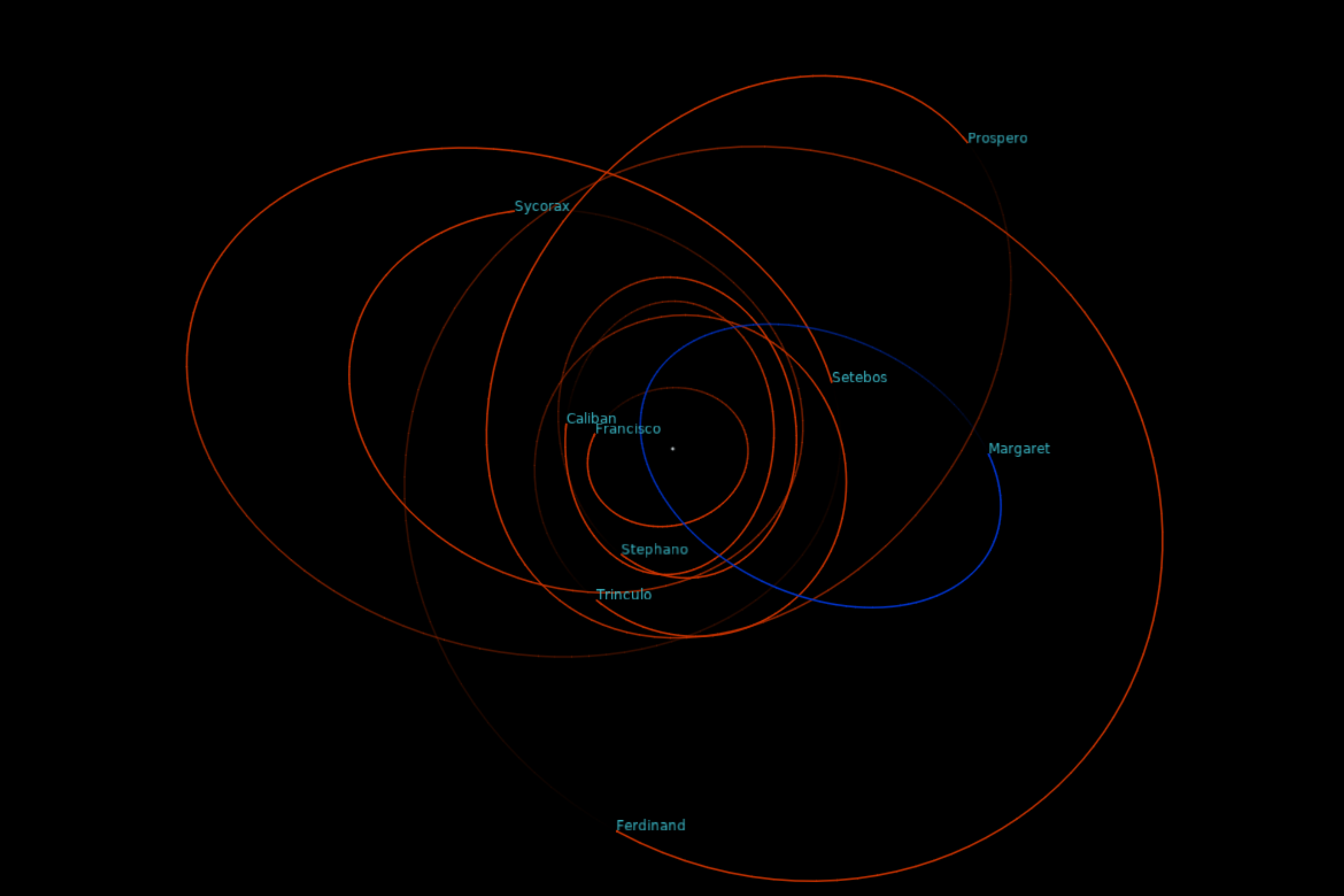
9 irregular moons of Uranus. Data as of 2021.

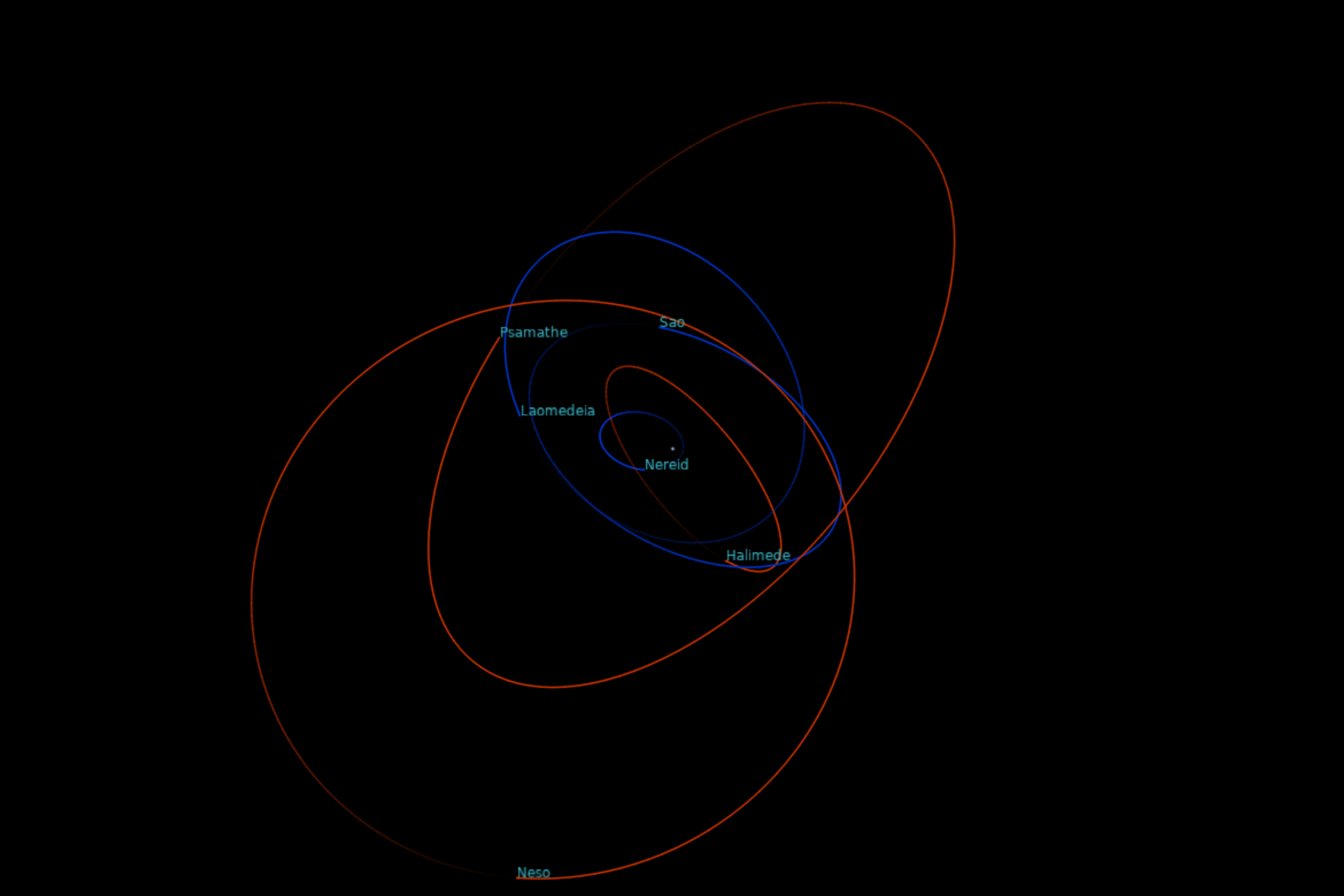
6 irregular moons of Neptune (excluding Triton). Data as of 2021.
