= List of natural satellites =

Of the Solar System's eight planets and its nine most likely dwarf planets, six planets and seven dwarf planets are known to be orbited by at least 468 natural satellites, or moons. At least 19 of them are large enough to be gravitationally rounded; of these, all are covered by a crust of ice except for Earth's Moon and Jupiter's Io. Several of the largest ones are in hydrostatic equilibrium and would therefore be considered dwarf planets or planets if they were in direct orbit around the Sun and not in their current states (orbiting planets or dwarf planets).

== Classification ==
Moons are classed into two separate categories according to their orbits: regular moons, which have prograde orbits (they orbit in the direction of their planets' rotation) and lie close to the plane of their equators, and irregular moons, whose orbits can be pro- or retrograde (against the direction of their planets' rotation) and often lie at extreme angles to their planets' equators. Irregular moons are probably minor planets that have been captured from surrounding space. Most irregular moons are less than 10 kilometres (6.2 mi) in diameter.

== Background ==
The earliest published discovery of a moon other than Earth's was by Galileo Galilei, who discovered the four Galilean moons orbiting Jupiter in 1610. Over the following three centuries, only a few more moons were discovered. Missions to other planets in the 1970s, most notably the Voyager 1 and 2 missions, saw a surge in the number of moons detected, and observations since the year 2000, using mostly large, ground-based optical telescopes, have discovered many more, all of which are irregular.

== Moons by primary ==
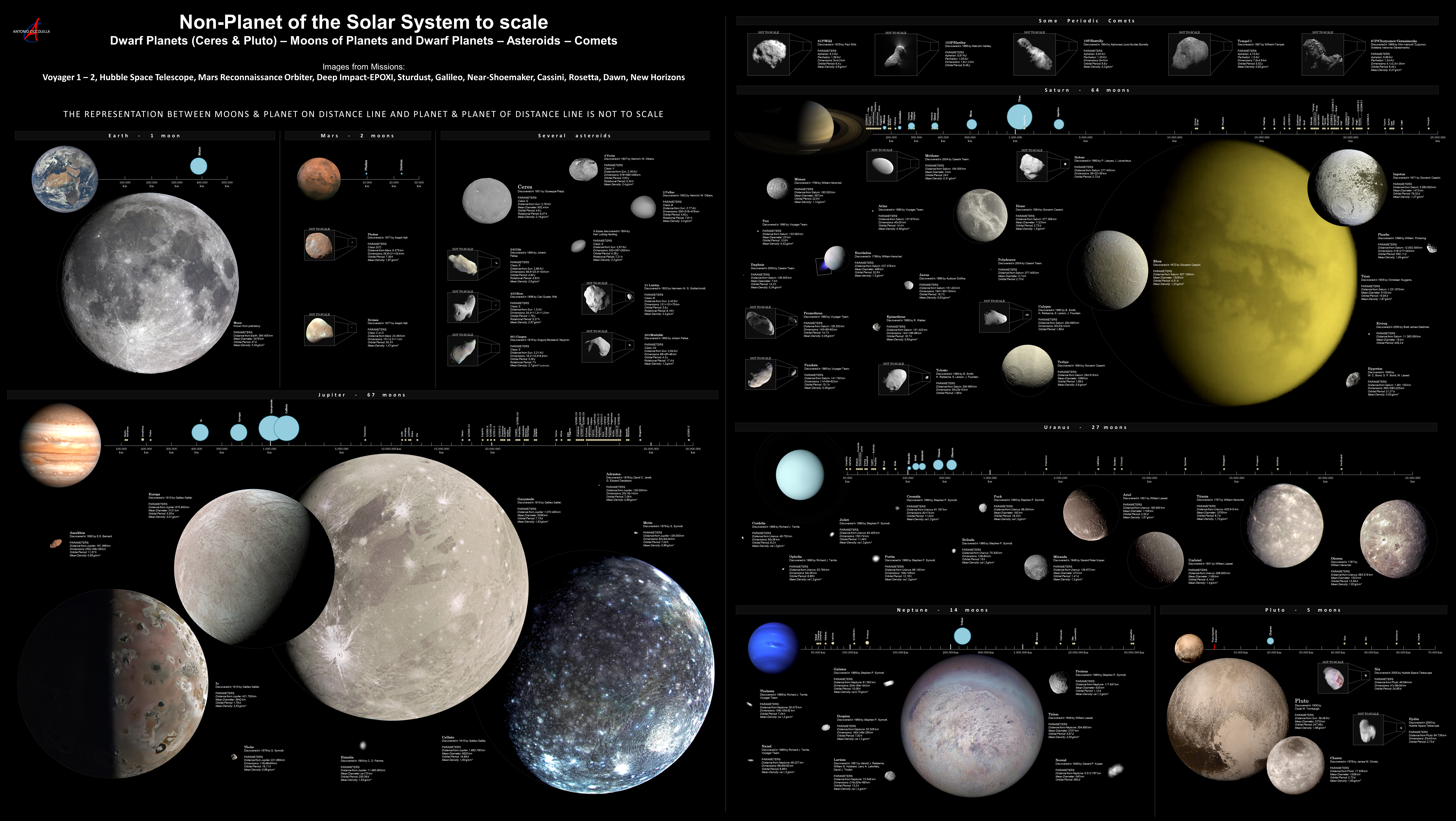
Some moons, minor planets and comets of the Solar System to scale (major planets not to scale)

Selected moons, with Earth to scale. Nineteen moons are large enough to be round, and two, Titan and Triton, have substantial atmospheres

The number of moons discovered in each year until March 2025

The number of moons announced in each year until March 2025

Mercury, the smallest and innermost planet, has no moons, or at least none that can be detected to a diameter of 1.6 km (1.0 mi). For a very short time in 1974, Mercury was thought to have a moon.

Venus also has no moons, though reports of a moon around Venus have circulated since the 17th century.

Earth has one known Moon, the largest moon of any rocky planet in the Solar System and the largest body typically described as a moon that orbits anything in hydrostatic equilibrium in relation to the primary object by mass and diameter other than Charon and Pluto. Earth also has more than 20 known co-orbitals, including the asteroids 3753 Cruithne and 469219 Kamoʻoalewa, and the occasional temporary satellite, like 2020 CD_{3}; however, since they do not permanently orbit Earth, they are not considered moons. (See Other moons of Earth and Quasi-satellite.)

Mars has two known moons, Phobos and Deimos ("fear" and "dread", after attendants of Ares, the Greek god of war, equivalent to the Roman Mars). Searches for additional satellites have been unsuccessful, putting the maximum radius of any other satellites at 90 m (100 yd).

Jupiter has 115 moons with known orbits announced; 73 of them have received permanent designations, and 57 have been named. Its eight regular moons are grouped into the planet-sized Galilean moons and the far smaller Amalthea group. They were named after lovers of Zeus, the Greek equivalent of Jupiter. Among them is Ganymede, the largest and most massive moon in the Solar System. The rest are irregular moons, which are organized into two categories: prograde and retrograde. The prograde satellites consist of the Himalia group and the Carpo group and two others in groups of one. The retrograde moons are grouped into the Carme, Ananke and Pasiphae groups.

Saturn has 293 moons with known orbits announced; 67 of them have received permanent designations, and 63 have been named. Most of them are quite small. Seven moons are large enough to be in hydrostatic equilibrium, including Titan, the second largest moon in the Solar System. Including these large moons, 25 of Saturn's moons are regular, and traditionally named after Titans or other figures associated with the mythological Saturn. The remaining moons are irregular, and classified by their orbital characteristics into Inuit, Norse, and Gallic groups, and their names are chosen from the corresponding mythologies the groups are named after. The rings of Saturn are made up of icy objects ranging in size from one centimetre to hundreds of metres, each of which is on its own orbit about the planet. Thus, a precise number of Saturnian moons cannot be given, as there is no objective boundary between the countless small anonymous objects that form Saturn's ring system and the larger objects that have been named as moons. At least 150 "moonlets" embedded in the rings have been detected by the disturbance they create in the surrounding ring material, though this is thought to be only a small sample of the total population of such objects.

Uranus has 29 known moons announced, five of which are massive enough to have achieved hydrostatic equilibrium. There are 14 moons that orbit within Uranus's ring system, and another ten outer irregular moons. Unlike most planetary moons, which are named from antiquity, all the moons of Uranus are named after characters from the works of Shakespeare and Alexander Pope's work The Rape of the Lock.

Neptune has 16 known moons announced; the largest, Triton, accounts for more than 99.5 percent of all the mass orbiting the planet. Triton is large enough to have achieved hydrostatic equilibrium, but, uniquely for a large moon, has a retrograde orbit, suggesting it was a dwarf planet that was captured. Neptune also has seven known inner regular satellites, and eight outer irregular satellites.

Among the other large dwarf planets and dwarf planet candidates, Ceres and Sedna have no known natural satellites. Observations by the Hubble Space Telescope and the Dawn spacecraft have so far failed to detect any moons of Ceres. The detection limits depend, among other factors, on the distance from Ceres and the assumed albedo of potential satellites.

Pluto, the largest dwarf planet by diameter, has five known moons. Its largest moon, Charon, named after the ferryman of Greek mythology who transported souls across the River Styx, is more than half the size of Pluto. The system's barycentre lies outside Pluto's surface. Both bodies orbit this common barycentre, forming a binary planetary system that is informally also referred to as a binary dwarf planet system. Pluto's four other moons – Nix, Hydra, Kerberos and Styx – are considerably smaller and orbit the Pluto–Charon system.

Eris has one known moon, Dysnomia. Determining its exact size is difficult. One estimate places its radius at approximately 307.5+30
−25 km.

Haumea has two moons, Hiʻiaka and Namaka. Hiʻiaka has a volume-equivalent radius of approximately 185 ± 10 km, while Namaka's radius is estimated to be around 75 km.

Makemake has one known moon, provisionally designated as S/2015 (136472) 1 and also known as MK2.

Among the other large trans-Neptunian objects, which are also considered dwarf planets by many astronomers, Orcus, Quaoar, and Gonggong each have at least one known moon: Vanth, Wewyot, and Xiangliu, respectively. A possible second satellite of Quaoar was discovered in 2025, although it has not yet been conclusively determined whether it is a moon or an additional ring.

A number of other smaller trans-Neptunian objects, including Huya, Salacia, Uni, Varda, and Chiminigagua, also have known moons. However, their classification as dwarf planets remains uncertain.

As of November 2026, 499 asteroid moons and 157 trans-Neptunian moons (including those of Pluto and the other dwarf planets) had been discovered.

Summary – number of moons
Planets	Mercury	Venus	Earth	Mars	Jupiter	Saturn	Uranus	Neptune
Number of moons	0	0	1	2	115	293	29	16

Consensus dwarf planets	Ceres	Orcus	Pluto	Haumea	Quaoar	Makemake	Gonggong	Eris	Sedna
Number of moons	0	1	5	2	1 (2?)	1	1	1	0

Minor planets
See list

Due to Earth's varying distance from these planets (as well as their distance to the Sun), the limits at which we are able to detect new moons are very inconsistent. As the below graph demonstrates, the maximum absolute magnitude (total inherent brightness, abbreviated H) of moons we have detected around planets occurs at H = 18 for Jupiter, H = 17 for Saturn, H = 14 for Uranus, and H = 12 for Neptune. Smaller moons may (and most likely do) exist around each of these planets, but are currently undetectable from Earth. Although spacecraft have visited all of these planets, Earth-based telescopes continue to outperform them in moon-detection ability due to their greater availability for wide-field surveys.

== List ==
This is a list of the recognized moons of the planets and of the largest potential dwarf planets of the Solar System, ordered by their official Roman numeral designations. Moons that do not yet have official Roman numeral designations (because their orbits are not yet known well enough) are listed after those that do.

The 19 moons that are known to be large enough to have been rounded by their own gravity are listed in bold. The seven largest moons, which are larger than any of the known dwarf planets, are listed in bold and italic. Sidereal period differs from semi-major axis because a moon's speed depends both on the mass of its primary and its distance from it.

Satellites of planets
Satellite of Earth	Satellites of Jupiter	Satellites of Uranus
Satellites of Mars	Satellites of Saturn	Satellites of Neptune
Satellites of generally agreed dwarf planets
Satellite of Orcus	Satellites of Pluto	Satellites of Haumea
Satellite of Quaoar	Satellite of Makemake	Satellite of Gonggong
Satellite of Eris		

Name	Image	Parent	Numeral	Mean radius (km)	Mass (10^{18} kg)	Orbital semi-major axis (km)	Sidereal period (d) (r = retrograde)	Discovery year	Year Announced	Discovered by	Apparent Magnitude (Note: Apparent magnitudes sourced from the moon's respective Wikipedia page, some may be taken from German Wikipedia articles that include more information, some may be calculated based on absolute magnitudes.)	Notes	Reference(s)
**Moon**		Earth	I (1)	1738	73460	384399	27.321582	Prehistoric	Prehistory	—	-12.9 to -2.5	Synchronous rotation (Binary)	
Phobos		Mars	I (1)	11.08±0.4	0.0106	9375	0.318	1877	1877	Hall	11.8	Synchronous rotation	
Deimos		Mars	II (2)	6.27±0.07	0,0014	23458	1.262	1877	1877	Hall	12.89	Synchronous rotation	
**Io**		Jupiter	I (1)	1,821.6±0.5	89,300	421,800	1.769	1610	1610	Galileo	5.02	Main-group moon (Galilean)	
**Europa**		Jupiter	II (2)	1,560.8±0.5	47,990	671,100	3.551	1610	1610	Galileo	5.29	Main-group moon (Galilean)	
**Ganymede**		Jupiter	III (3)	2,634.1±0.3	148,150	1,070,400	7.155	1610	1610	Galileo	4.61	Main-group moon (Galilean)	
**Callisto**		Jupiter	IV (4)	2,410.3±1.5	107,570	1,882,700	16.69	1610	1610	Galileo	5.65	Main-group moon (Galilean)	
Amalthea		Jupiter	V (5)	83.5±2		181,400	0.498	1892	1892	Barnard	14.1	Inner moon (Amalthea)	
Himalia		Jupiter	VI (6)	69.8		11,461,000	250.56	1904	1905	Perrine	14.6	Prograde irregular (Himalia)	
Elara		Jupiter	VII (7)	39.95		11,741,000	259.64	1905	1905	Perrine	16.6	Prograde irregular (Himalia)	
Pasiphae		Jupiter	VIII (8)	28.9		23,624,000	743.63 (r)	1908	1908	Melotte	16.9	Retrograde irregular (Pasiphae)	
Sinope		Jupiter	IX (9)	17.5		23,939,000	758.90 (r)	1914	1914	Nicholson	18.3	Retrograde irregular (Pasiphae)	
Lysithea		Jupiter	X (10)	21.1		11,717,000	259.20	1938	1938	Nicholson	18.2	Prograde irregular (Himalia)	
Carme		Jupiter	XI (11)	23.3		23,404,000	734.17 (r)	1938	1938	Nicholson	18.9	Retrograde irregular (Carme)	
Ananke		Jupiter	XII (12)	14.55		21,276,000	629.77 (r)	1951	1951	Nicholson	18.9	Retrograde irregular (Ananke)	
Leda		Jupiter	XIII (13)	10.75		11,165,000	240.92	1974	1974	Kowal	20.2	Prograde irregular (Himalia)	
Thebe		Jupiter	XIV (14)	49.3±2.0	0.452	221,900	0.675	1979	1980	Synnott (Voyager 1)	15.7	Inner moon (Amalthea)	
Adrastea		Jupiter	XV (15)	8.2±2.0	0.002	129,000	0.298	1979	1979	Jewitt, Danielson (Voyager 1)	19.1	Inner moon (Amalthea)	
Metis		Jupiter	XVI (16)	21.5±2.0		128,000	0.295	1979	1980	Synnott (Voyager 1)	17.50	Inner moon (Amalthea)	
Callirrhoe		Jupiter	XVII (17)	4.8		24,103,000	758.77 (r)	1999	2000	Scotti, Spahr, McMillan, Larsen, Montani, Gleason, Gehrels	20.8	Retrograde irregular (Pasiphae)	
Themisto		Jupiter	XVIII (18)	4.5		7,284,000	130.02	1975/2000	1975/2000	Kowal and Roemer (original); Sheppard, Jewitt, Fernández, Magnier (rediscovery)	21.0	Prograde irregular (Themisto)	
Megaclite		Jupiter	XIX (19)	2.7		23,493,000	752.86 (r)	2000	2001	Sheppard, Jewitt, Fernández, Magnier, Dahm, Evans	21.7	Retrograde irregular (Pasiphae)	
Taygete		Jupiter	XX (20)	2.5		23,280,000	732.41 (r)	2000	2001	Sheppard, Jewitt, Fernández, Magnier, Dahm, Evans	21.9	Retrograde irregular (Carme)	
Chaldene		Jupiter	XXI (21)	1.9		23,100,000	723.72 (r)	2000	2001	Sheppard, Jewitt, Fernández, Magnier, Dahm, Evans	22.5	Retrograde irregular (Carme)	
Harpalyke		Jupiter	XXII (22)	2.2		20,858,000	623.32 (r)	2000	2001	Sheppard, Jewitt, Fernández, Magnier, Dahm, Evans	22.2	Retrograde irregular (Ananke)	
Kalyke		Jupiter	XXIII (23)	3.45		23,483,000	742.06 (r)	2000	2001	Sheppard, Jewitt, Fernández, Magnier, Dahm, Evans	21.8	Retrograde irregular (Carme)	
Iocaste		Jupiter	XXIV (24)	2.6		21,060,000	631.60 (r)	2000	2001	Sheppard, Jewitt, Fernández, Magnier, Dahm, Evans	21.8	Retrograde irregular (Ananke)	
Erinome		Jupiter	XXV (25)	1.6		23,196,000	728.46 (r)	2000	2001	Sheppard, Jewitt, Fernández, Magnier, Dahm, Evans	22.8	Retrograde irregular (Carme)	
Isonoe		Jupiter	XXVI (26)	1.9		23,155,000	726.23 (r)	2000	2001	Sheppard, Jewitt, Fernández, Magnier, Dahm, Evans	22.5	Retrograde irregular (Carme)	
Praxidike		Jupiter	XXVII (27)	3.5		20,908,000	625.39 (r)	2000	2001	Sheppard, Jewitt, Fernández, Magnier, Dahm, Evans	21.2	Retrograde irregular (Ananke)	
Autonoe		Jupiter	XXVIII (28)	2		24,046,000	760.95 (r)	2001	2002	Sheppard, Jewitt, Kleyna	22.0	Retrograde irregular (Pasiphae)	
Thyone		Jupiter	XXIX (29)	2		20,939,000	627.21 (r)	2001	2002	Sheppard, Jewitt, Kleyna	22.3	Retrograde irregular (Ananke)	
Hermippe		Jupiter	XXX (30)	2		21,131,000	633.9 (r)	2001	2002	Sheppard, Jewitt, Kleyna	22.1	Retrograde irregular (Ananke)	
Aitne		Jupiter	XXXI (31)	1.5		23,229,000	730.18 (r)	2001	2002	Sheppard, Jewitt, Kleyna	22.7	Retrograde irregular (Carme)	
Eurydome		Jupiter	XXXII (32)	1.5		22,865,000	717.33 (r)	2001	2002	Sheppard, Jewitt, Kleyna	22.7	Retrograde irregular (Pasiphae)	
Euanthe		Jupiter	XXXIII (33)	1.5		20,797,000	620.49 (r)	2001	2002	Sheppard, Jewitt, Kleyna	22.8	Retrograde irregular (Ananke)	
Euporie		Jupiter	XXXIV (34)	1		19,304,000	550.74 (r)	2001	2002	Sheppard, Jewitt, Kleyna	23.1	Retrograde irregular (Ananke)	
Orthosie		Jupiter	XXXV (35)	1		20,720,000	622.56 (r)	2001	2002	Sheppard, Jewitt, Kleyna	23.1	Retrograde irregular (Ananke)	
Sponde		Jupiter	XXXVI (36)	1		23,487,000	748.34 (r)	2001	2002	Sheppard, Jewitt, Kleyna	23.0	Retrograde irregular (Pasiphae)	
Kale		Jupiter	XXXVII (37)	1		23,217,000	729.47 (r)	2001	2002	Sheppard, Jewitt, Kleyna	23.0	Retrograde irregular (Carme)	
Pasithee		Jupiter	XXXVIII (38)	1		23,004,000	719.44 (r)	2001	2002	Sheppard, Jewitt, Kleyna	23.2	Retrograde irregular (Carme)	
Hegemone		Jupiter	XXXIX (39)	1.5		23,577,000	739.88 (r)	2003	2003	Sheppard, Jewitt, Kleyna, Fernández	22.8	Retrograde irregular (Pasiphae)	
Mneme		Jupiter	XL (40)	1		21,035,000	620.04 (r)	2003	2003	Gladman, Allen	23.3	Retrograde irregular (Ananke)	
Aoede		Jupiter	XLI (41)	2		23,980,000	761.50 (r)	2003	2003	Sheppard, Jewitt, Kleyna, Fernández, Hsieh	22.5	Retrograde irregular (Pasiphae)	
Thelxinoe		Jupiter	XLII (42)	1		21,164,000	628.09 (r)	2003	2004	Sheppard, Jewitt, Kleyna, Gladman, Kavelaars, Petit, Allen	23.5	Retrograde irregular (Ananke)	
Arche		Jupiter	XLIII (43)	1.5		23,355,000	731.95 (r)	2002	2002	Sheppard, Meech, Hsieh, Tholen, Tonry	22.8	Retrograde irregular (Carme)	
Kallichore		Jupiter	XLIV (44)	1		23,288,000	728.73 (r)	2003	2003	Sheppard, Jewitt, Kleyna, Fernández	23.7	Retrograde irregular (Carme)	
Helike		Jupiter	XLV (45)	2		21,069,000	626.32 (r)	2003	2003	Sheppard, Jewitt, Kleyna, Fernández, Hsieh	22.6	Retrograde irregular (Ananke)	
Carpo		Jupiter	XLVI (46)	1.5		17,058,000	456.30	2003	2003	Sheppard, Gladman, Kavelaars, Petit, Allen, Jewitt, Kleyna	23.0	Prograde irregular (Carpo)	
Eukelade		Jupiter	XLVII (47)	2		23,328,000	730.47 (r)	2003	2003	Sheppard, Jewitt, Kleyna, Fernández, Hsieh	22.6	Retrograde irregular (Carme)	
Cyllene		Jupiter	XLVIII (48)	1		23,809,000	752 (r)	2003	2003	Sheppard, Jewitt, Kleyna	23.2	Retrograde irregular (Pasiphae)	
Kore		Jupiter	XLIX (49)	1		24,543,000	779.17 (r)	2003	2003	Sheppard, Jewitt, Kleyna	23.6	Retrograde irregular (Pasiphae)	
Herse		Jupiter	L (50)	1		22,983,000	714.51 (r)	2003	2003	Gladman, Sheppard, Jewitt, Kleyna, Kavelaars, Petit, Allen	23.4	Retrograde irregular (Carme)	
S/2010 J 1		Jupiter	LI (51)	1		23,314,300	723.2 (r)	2010	2011	Jacobson, Brozović, Gladman, Alexandersen	≈23	Retrograde irregular (Carme)	
S/2010 J 2		Jupiter	LII (52)	0.5		20,307,200	588.1 (r)	2010	2011	Veillet	24	Retrograde irregular (Ananke)	
Dia		Jupiter	LIII (53)	2		12,118,000	287.0	2000	2001	Sheppard, Jewitt, Kleyna, Fernández, Hsieh		Prograde irregular (Himalia)	
S/2016 J 1		Jupiter	LIV (54)	1		20,595,500	602.7 (r)	2016	2017	Sheppard	≈24.2	Retrograde irregular (Ananke)	
S/2003 J 18		Jupiter	LV (55)	1		20,274,000	588.0 (r)	2003	2003	Gladman, Sheppard, Jewitt, Kleyna, Kavelaars, Petit, Allen	23.4	Retrograde irregular (Ananke)	
S/2011 J 2		Jupiter	LVI (56)	0.5		23,329,700	726.8 (r)	2011	2012	Sheppard	23.5	Retrograde irregular (Pasiphae)	
Eirene		Jupiter	LVII (57)	2		23,731,800	759.7 (r)	2003	2003	Sheppard, Jewitt, Kleyna, Fernández, Hsieh	22.4	Retrograde irregular (Carme)	
Philophrosyne		Jupiter	LVIII (58)	1		22,820,000	701.3 (r)	2003	2003	Sheppard, Jewitt, Kleyna, Fernández	23.5	Retrograde irregular (Pasiphae)	
S/2017 J 1		Jupiter	LIX (59)	2		23,484,000	734.2 (r)	2017	2017	Sheppard	≈23.8	Retrograde irregular (Pasiphae)	
Eupheme		Jupiter	LX (60)	1		21,199,710	627.8 (r)	2003	2003	Sheppard, Jewitt, Kleyna, Fernández, Hsieh	23.4	Retrograde irregular (Ananke)	
S/2003 J 19		Jupiter	LXI (61)	1		22,757,000	697.6 (r)	2003	2003	Gladman, Sheppard, Jewitt, Kleyna, Kavelaars, Petit, Allen	23.7	Retrograde irregular (Carme)	
Valetudo		Jupiter	LXII (62)	0.5		18,928,100	532.0	2016	2018	Sheppard		Prograde irregular (Valetudo)	
S/2017 J 2		Jupiter	LXIII (63)	1		23,241,000	723.8 (r)	2017	2018	Sheppard		Retrograde irregular (Carme)	
S/2017 J 3		Jupiter	LXIV (64)	1		20,639,300	605.8 (r)	2017	2018	Sheppard		Retrograde irregular (Ananke)	
Pandia		Jupiter	LXV (65)	1.5		11,494,800	251.8	2017	2018	Sheppard	23.0	Prograde irregular (Himalia)	
S/2017 J 5		Jupiter	LXVI (66)	1		23,169,400	720.5 (r)	2017	2018	Sheppard		Retrograde irregular (Carme)	
S/2017 J 6		Jupiter	LXVII (67)	1		22,394,700	684.7 (r)	2017	2018	Sheppard		Retrograde irregular (Pasiphae)	
S/2017 J 7		Jupiter	LXVIII (68)	1		20,571,500	602.8 (r)	2017	2018	Sheppard		Retrograde irregular (Ananke)	
S/2017 J 8		Jupiter	LXIX (69)	0.5		23,174,400	720.7 (r)	2017	2018	Sheppard		Retrograde irregular (Carme)	
S/2017 J 9		Jupiter	LXX (70)	1		21,430,000	640.9 (r)	2017	2018	Sheppard		Retrograde irregular (Ananke)	
Ersa		Jupiter	LXXI (71)	1.5		11,453,000	250.4	2018	2018	Sheppard		Prograde irregular (Himalia)	
S/2011 J 1		Jupiter	LXXII (72)	0.5		20,155,300	580.7 (r)	2011	2012	Sheppard	23.7	Retrograde irregular (Carme)	
S/2003 J 2		Jupiter	LXXIII (73)	1		20,554,400	602.02 (r)	2003	2003	Sheppard, Jewitt, Kleyna, Fernández, Hsieh	23.2	Retrograde irregular (Ananke)	
S/2003 J 4		Jupiter	—	1		22,048,600	668.85 (r)	2003	2003	Sheppard, Jewitt, Kleyna, Fernández, Hsieh	23	Retrograde irregular (Pasiphae)	
S/2003 J 9		Jupiter	—	0.5		24,168,700	767.6 (r)	2003	2003	Sheppard, Jewitt, Kleyna, Fernández	23.7	Retrograde irregular (Carme)	
S/2003 J 10		Jupiter	—	1		22,896,000	707.78 (r)	2003	2003	Sheppard, Jewitt, Kleyna, Fernández	23.6	Retrograde irregular (Carme)	
S/2003 J 12		Jupiter	—	0.5		21,557,700	646.64 (r)	2003	2003	Sheppard, Jewitt, Kleyna, Fernández	23	Retrograde irregular (Ananke)	
S/2003 J 16		Jupiter	—	1		20,512,500	600.18 (r)	2003	2003	Gladman, Sheppard, Jewitt, Kleyna, Kavelaars, Petit, Allen	23.3	Retrograde irregular (Ananke)	
S/2003 J 23		Jupiter	—	1		24,678,100	792.00 (r)	2003	2004	Sheppard, Jewitt, Kleyna, Fernández	23.6	Retrograde irregular (Pasiphae)	
S/2003 J 24		Jupiter	—	1.5		23,088,000	715.4 (r)	2003	2021	Sheppard, Jewitt, Kleyna, Gladman, Veillet	23.8	Retrograde irregular (Carme)	
S/2010 J 3		Jupiter	—	0.5		23,862,900	753.28 (r)	2010	2026	Sheppard	17.2	Retrograde irregular (Pasiphae)	
S/2010 J 4		Jupiter	—	0.5		22,793,400	703.19 (r)	2010	2026	Sheppard	17.2	Retrograde irregular (Carme)	
S/2011 J 3		Jupiter	—	1.5		11,797,200	261.77	2011	2022	Sheppard	23.1	Prograde irregular (Himalia)	
S/2011 J 6		Jupiter	—	0.5		23,238,700	723.93 (r)	2011	2026	Sheppard	16.9	Retrograde irregular (Carme)	
S/2016 J 3		Jupiter	—	1		22,213,500	676.37 (r)	2016	2023	Sheppard	23.6	Retrograde irregular (Carme)	
S/2016 J 4		Jupiter	—	1		23,664,100	743.69 (r)	2016	2023	Sheppard	24.0	Retrograde irregular (Pasiphae)	
S/2017 J 10		Jupiter	―	2		21,523,400	645.09 (r)	2017	2025	Sheppard		Retrograde irregular (Ananke)	
S/2017 J 11		Jupiter	―	2		22,742,300	700.66 (r)	2017	2025	Sheppard		Retrograde irregular (Carme)	
S/2017 J 12		Jupiter	—	0.5		23,270,500	725.40 (r)	2017	2026	Sheppard	17.3	Retrograde irregular (Carme)	
S/2017 J 13		Jupiter	—	0.5		22,842,700	705.50 (r)	2017	2026	Sheppard	17	Retrograde irregular (Carme)	
S/2017 J 14		Jupiter	—	0.5		23,412,500	732.04 (r)	2017	2026	Sheppard	17	Retrograde irregular (Pasiphae)	
S/2017 J 15		Jupiter	—	1		23,170,300	720.65 (r)	2017	2026	Sheppard	17.1	Retrograde irregular (Pasiphae)	
S/2017 J 16		Jupiter	—	0.5		23,007,800	713.13 (r)	2017	2026	Sheppard	17.2	Retrograde irregular (Carme)	
S/2017 J 17		Jupiter	—	0.5		11,776,100	261.07	2017	2026	Sheppard	17.2	Prograde irregular (Himalia)	
S/2017 J 18		Jupiter	—	1		22,923,800	709.24 (r)	2017	2026	Sheppard	16.8	Retrograde irregular (Carme)	
S/2018 J 2		Jupiter	—	1.5		11,467,500	250.88	2018	2022	Sheppard	23.3	Prograde irregular (Himalia)	
S/2018 J 3		Jupiter	—	0.5		22,826,600	704.56 (r)	2018	2023	Sheppard	23.9	Retrograde irregular (Carme)	
S/2018 J 4		Jupiter	—	1		16,504,300	433.16	2018	2023	Sheppard	23.5	Prograde irregular (Carpo)	
S/2021 J 1		Jupiter	—	0.5		20,667,200	606.99 (r)	2021	2023	Sheppard	23.9	Retrograde irregular (Ananke)	
S/2021 J 2		Jupiter	—	0.5		21,140,600	627.96 (r)	2021	2023	Sheppard	24.0	Retrograde irregular (Ananke)	
S/2021 J 3		Jupiter	—	1		21,495,700	643.85 (r)	2021	2023	Sheppard	24.0	Retrograde irregular (Ananke)	
S/2021 J 4		Jupiter	—	0.5		22,946,700	710.13 (r)	2021	2023	Sheppard	24.0	Retrograde irregular (Carme)	
S/2021 J 5		Jupiter	—	1		22,831,800	704.80 (r)	2021	2023	Sheppard, Tholen, Trujillo	23.6	Retrograde irregular (Carme)	
S/2021 J 6		Jupiter	—	0.5		23,427,200	732.55 (r)	2021	2023	Sheppard, Tholen, Trujillo	23.9	Retrograde irregular (Carme)	
S/2022 J 1		Jupiter	—	0.5		22,015,500	667.34 (r)	2022	2023	Sheppard	23.8	Retrograde irregular (Carme)	
S/2022 J 2		Jupiter	—	0.5		22,413,200	685.51 (r)	2022	2023	Sheppard	24.0	Retrograde irregular (Carme)	
S/2022 J 3		Jupiter	—	0.5		20,912,400	617.82 (r)	2022	2023	Sheppard	24.0	Retrograde irregular (Ananke)	
**Mimas**		Saturn	I (1)	198.2±0.4	37.51	185,540	0.942	1789	1789	Herschel	12.9	Main-group moon	
**Enceladus**		Saturn	II (2)	252.1±0.2	108.0	238,040	1.370	1789	1789	Herschel	11.7	Main-group moon	
**Tethys**		Saturn	III (3)	533.1±0.7	617.5	294,670	1.888	1684	1686	Cassini	10.2	Main-group moon (Sidera Lodoicea)	
**Dione**		Saturn	IV (4)	561.4±0.4	1,095	377,420	2.737	1684	1686	Cassini	10.4	Main-group moon (Sidera Lodoicea)	
**Rhea**		Saturn	V (5)	763.8±1.0	2,306	527,070	4.518	1672	1673	Cassini	10	Main-group moon (Sidera Lodoicea)	
**Titan**		Saturn	VI (6)	2,574.73±0.09	134,520	1,221,870	15.95	1655	1656	Huygens	8.2 to 9.0	Main-group moon	
Hyperion		Saturn	VII (7)	135	5.551	1,500,880	21.28	1848	1848	W.Bond, G. Bond, and Lassell	14.1	Main-group moon	
**Iapetus**		Saturn	VIII (8)	735.6±1.5	1,805	3,560,840	79.33	1671	1673	Cassini	10.2 to 11.9	Main-group moon (Sidera Lodoicea) Brightest when west of Saturn every 40 days	
Phoebe		Saturn	IX (9)	106.5±0.7	8.312	12,947,780	550.31 (r)	1898	1899	Pickering	15.89	Retrograde irregular (Norse)	
Janus		Saturn	X (10)	89.5±1.4	1.897	151,460	0.695	1966/1980	1967/1980	Dollfus; Voyager 1 (confirmed)	14.4	Inner moon (co-orbital)	
Epimetheus		Saturn	XI (11)	58.1±1.8	0.526	151,410	0.694	1966/1980	1967/1980	Walker; Voyager 1 (confirmed)	15.6	Inner moon (co-orbital)	
Helene		Saturn	XII (12)	17.6±0.4	0.007	377,420	2.737	1980	1980	Laques, Lecacheux	18.4	Main-group trojan	
Telesto		Saturn	XIII (13)	12.4±0.4		294,710	1.888	1980/1981	1980	Smith, Reitsema, Larson, Fountain (Voyager 1)	18.7	Main-group trojan	
Calypso		Saturn	XIV (14)	10.7±0.7		294,710	1.888	1980/1981	1980	Pascu, Seidelmann, Baum, Currie	18.7	Main-group trojan	
Atlas		Saturn	XV (15)	15.1±0.9	0.006	137,670	0.602	1980	1980	Terrile (Voyager 1)	19.0	Inner moon (shepherd)	
Prometheus		Saturn	XVI (16)	43.1±2.7		139,380	0.613	1980	1980	Collins (Voyager 1)	15.8	Inner moon (shepherd)	
Pandora		Saturn	XVII (17)	40.7±1.5		141,720	0.629	1980	1980	Collins (Voyager 1)	16.4	Inner moon (shepherd)	
Pan		Saturn	XVIII (18)	14.1	0.004	133,580	0.575	1981	1990	Showalter (Voyager 2)	19.4	Inner moon (shepherd)	
Ymir		Saturn	XIX (19)	11		23,140,400	1,315.58 (r)	2000	2000	Gladman		Retrograde irregular (Norse)	
Paaliaq		Saturn	XX (20)	14.5		15,200,000	686.95	2000	2000	Gladman		Prograde irregular (Inuit) (Paaliaq)	
Tarvos		Saturn	XXI (21)	7.5		17,983,000	926.23	2000	2000	Gladman, Kavelaars		Prograde irregular (Gallic)	
Ijiraq		Saturn	XXII (22)	6		11,124,000	451.42	2000	2000	Gladman, Kavelaars		Prograde irregular (Inuit) (Kiviuq)	
Suttungr		Saturn	XXIII (23)	3.5		19,459,000	1,016.67 (r)	2000	2000	Gladman, Kavelaars		Retrograde irregular (Norse)	
Kiviuq		Saturn	XXIV (24)	8		11,110,000	449.22	2000	2000	Gladman		Prograde irregular (Inuit) (Kiviuq)	
Mundilfari		Saturn	XXV (25)	3.5		18,628,000	952.77 (r)	2000	2000	Gladman, Kavelaars		Retrograde irregular (Norse)	
Albiorix		Saturn	XXVI (26)	14.3		16,182,000	783.45	2000	2000	Holman, Spahr		Prograde irregular (Gallic)	
Skathi		Saturn	XXVII (27)	4		15,540,000	728.20 (r)	2000	2000	Gladman, Kavelaars		Retrograde irregular (Norse)	
Erriapus		Saturn	XXVIII (28)	5		17,343,000	871.19	2000	2000	Gladman, Kavelaars		Prograde irregular (Gallic)	
Siarnaq		Saturn	XXIX (29)	19.65		18,015,400	896.44	2000	2000	Gladman, Kavelaars		Prograde irregular (Inuit) (Siarnaq)	
Thrymr		Saturn	XXX (30)	3.5		20,314,000	1,094.11 (r)	2000	2000	Gladman, Kavelaars		Retrograde irregular (Norse)	
Narvi		Saturn	XXXI (31)	3.5		19,007,000	1,003.86 (r)	2003	2003	Sheppard, Jewitt, Kleyna		Retrograde irregular (Norse)	
Methone		Saturn	XXXII (32)	1.45		194,440	1.010	2004	2004	Porco, Charnoz, Brahic, Dones (Cassini–Huygens)		Alkyonide moon	
Pallene		Saturn	XXXIII (33)	2.22		212,280	1.154	1981/2004	2004	Gordon, Murray, Beurle, et al. (Cassini–Huygens)		Alkyonide moon	
Polydeuces		Saturn	XXXIV (34)	1.3		377,200	2.737	2004	2004	Porco et al. (Cassini–Huygens)		Main-group trojan	
Daphnis		Saturn	XXXV (35)	3.8±0.8		136,500	0.594	2005	2005	Porco et al. (Cassini–Huygens)		Inner moon (shepherd)	
Aegir		Saturn	XXXVI (36)	3		20,751,000	1,117.52 (r)	2004	2005	Sheppard, Jewitt, Kleyna, Marsden		Retrograde irregular (Norse)	
Bebhionn		Saturn	XXXVII (37)	3		17,119,000	834.84	2004	2005	Sheppard, Jewitt, Kleyna, Marsden		Prograde irregular (Gallic)	
Bergelmir		Saturn	XXXVIII (38)	3		19,336,000	1,005.74 (r)	2004	2005	Sheppard, Jewitt, Kleyna, Marsden		Retrograde irregular (Norse)	
Bestla		Saturn	XXXIX (39)	3.5		20,192,000	1,088.72 (r)	2004	2005	Sheppard, Jewitt, Kleyna, Marsden		Retrograde irregular (Norse)	
Farbauti		Saturn	XL (40)	2.5		20,377,000	1,085.55 (r)	2004	2005	Sheppard, Jewitt, Kleyna, Marsden	24.7	Retrograde irregular (Norse)	
Fenrir		Saturn	XLI (41)	2		22,454,000	1,260.35 (r)	2004	2005	Sheppard, Jewitt, Kleyna, Marsden	25.0	Retrograde irregular (Norse)	
Fornjot		Saturn	XLII (42)	3		25,146,000	1,494.2 (r)	2004	2005	Sheppard, Jewitt, Kleyna, Marsden	24.6	Retrograde irregular (Norse)	
Hati		Saturn	XLIII (43)	3		19,846,000	1,038.61 (r)	2004	2005	Sheppard, Jewitt, Kleyna, Marsden	24.4	Retrograde irregular (Norse)	
Hyrrokkin		Saturn	XLIV (44)	4		18,437,000	931.86 (r)	2004	2006	Sheppard, Jewitt, Kleyna	23.5	Retrograde irregular (Norse)	
Kari		Saturn	XLV (45)	3.5		22,089,000	1,230.97 (r)	2006	2006	Sheppard, Jewitt, Kleyna	23.9	Retrograde irregular (Norse)	
Loge		Saturn	XLVI (46)	3		23,058,000	1,311.36 (r)	2006	2006	Sheppard, Jewitt, Kleyna	24.6	Retrograde irregular (Norse)	
Skoll		Saturn	XLVII (47)	3		17,665,000	878.29 (r)	2006	2006	Sheppard, Jewitt, Kleyna	24.5	Retrograde irregular (Norse)	
Surtur		Saturn	XLVIII (48)	3		22,704,000	1,297.36 (r)	2006	2006	Sheppard, Jewitt, Kleyna	24.8	Retrograde irregular (Norse)	
Anthe		Saturn	XLIX (49)	0.9		197,700	1.0365	2007	2007	Porco et al. (Cassini–Huygens)		Alkyonide moon	
Jarnsaxa		Saturn	L (50)	3		18,811,000	964.74 (r)	2006	2006	Sheppard, Jewitt, Kleyna	24.7	Retrograde irregular (Norse)	
Greip		Saturn	LI (51)	3		18,206,000	921.19 (r)	2006	2006	Sheppard, Jewitt, Kleyna	24.4	Retrograde irregular (Norse)	
Tarqeq		Saturn	LII (52)	3.5		18,009,000	887.48	2007	2007	Sheppard, Jewitt, Kleyna	23.9	Prograde irregular (Inuit) (Siarnaq)	
Aegaeon		Saturn	LIII (53)	0.33		167,500	0.808	2008	2009	Cassini Imaging Science Team Cassini–Huygens		G-ring moonlet	
Gridr		Saturn	LIV (54)	3		19,418,000	1,010.55 (r)	2004	2019	Sheppard, Jewitt, Kleyna		Retrograde irregular (Norse)	
Angrboda		Saturn	LV (55)	3		20,636,000	1,107.13 (r)	2004	2019	Sheppard, Jewitt, Kleyna		Retrograde irregular (Norse)	
Skrymir		Saturn	LVI (56)	4		21,163,000	1,149.82 (r)	2004	2019	Sheppard, Jewitt, Kleyna		Retrograde irregular (Norse)	
Gerd		Saturn	LVII (57)	4		21,174,000	1,150.69 (r)	2004	2019	Sheppard, Jewitt, Kleyna		Retrograde irregular (Norse)	
S/2004 S 26		Saturn	LVIII (58)	4		26,676,000	1,627.18 (r)	2004	2019	Sheppard, Jewitt, Kleyna, Marsden		Retrograde irregular (Norse)	
Eggther		Saturn	LIX (59)	3		19,976,000	1,054.45 (r)	2004	2019	Sheppard, Jewitt, Kleyna, Marsden, Jacobson		Retrograde irregular (Norse)	
S/2004 S 29		Saturn	LX (60)	4		16,981,000	826.44	2004	2019	Sheppard, Jewitt, Kleyna, Marsden		Prograde irregular (Gallic)	
Beli		Saturn	LXI (61)	3		20,396,000	1,087.84 (r)	2004	2019	Sheppard, Jewitt, Kleyna		Retrograde irregular (Norse)	
Gunnlod		Saturn	LXII (62)	4		21,214,000	1,153.96 (r)	2004	2019	Sheppard, Jewitt, Kleyna		Retrograde irregular (Norse)	
Thiazzi		Saturn	LXIII (63)	4		24,168,000	1,403.18 (r)	2004	2019	Sheppard, Jewitt, Kleyna		Retrograde irregular (Norse)	
S/2004 S 34		Saturn	LXIV (64)	3		24,299,000	1,414.59 (r)	2004	2019	Sheppard, Jewitt, Kleyna		Retrograde irregular (Norse)	
Alvaldi		Saturn	LXV (65)	3		22,412,000	1,253.08 (r)	2004	2019	Sheppard, Jewitt, Kleyna, Marsden		Retrograde irregular (Norse)	
Geirrod		Saturn	LXVI (66)	4		21,908,000	1,211.02 (r)	2004	2019	Sheppard, Jewitt, Kleyna		Retrograde irregular (Norse)	
S/2004 S 7		Saturn	LXVII (67)	3		20,999,000	1,140.24 (r)	2004	2005	Sheppard, Jewitt, Kleyna, Marsden		Retrograde irregular (Norse)	
S/2004 S 12		Saturn	—	2.5		19,878,000	1,046.19 (r)	2004	2005	Sheppard, Jewitt, Kleyna, Marsden		Retrograde irregular (Norse)	
S/2004 S 13		Saturn	—	3		18,404,000	933.48 (r)	2004	2005	Sheppard, Jewitt, Kleyna, Marsden		Retrograde irregular (Norse)	
S/2004 S 17		Saturn	—	2		19,447,000	1,014.70 (r)	2004	2005	Sheppard, Jewitt, Kleyna, Marsden		Retrograde irregular (Norse)	
S/2004 S 21		Saturn	—	3		22,645,000	1,272.61 (r)	2004	2019	Sheppard, Jewitt, Kleyna		Retrograde irregular (Norse)	
S/2004 S 24		Saturn	—	3		22,901,000	1,294.25	2004	2019	Sheppard, Jewitt, Kleyna, Marsden		Prograde irregular (group unknown, possibly Gallic)	
S/2004 S 28		Saturn	—	2		22,020,000	1,220.31 (r)	2004	2019	Sheppard, Jewitt, Kleyna, Marsden		Retrograde irregular (Norse)	
S/2004 S 31		Saturn	—	4		17,568,000	869.65	2004	2019	Sheppard, Jewitt, Kleyna, Marsden		Prograde irregular (Inuit) (Siarnaq)	
S/2004 S 36		Saturn	—	3		23,192,000	1,319.07 (r)	2004	2019	Sheppard, Jewitt, Kleyna		Retrograde irregular (Norse)	
S/2004 S 37		Saturn	—	2		15,892,000	748.18 (r)	2004	2019	Sheppard, Jewitt, Kleyna		Retrograde irregular (Norse)	
S/2004 S 39		Saturn	—	3		23,575,000	1,351.83 (r)	2004	2019	Sheppard, Jewitt, Kleyna		Retrograde irregular (Norse)	
S/2004 S 40		Saturn	—	2		16,075,600	765.92 (r)	2004	2023	Sheppard et al.		Retrograde irregular (Norse)	
S/2004 S 41		Saturn	—	2		18,095,000	895.76 (r)	2004	2023	Sheppard et al.		Retrograde irregular (Norse)	
S/2004 S 42		Saturn	—	2		18,240,800	910.61 (r)	2004	2023	Sheppard et al.		Retrograde irregular (Norse)	
S/2004 S 43		Saturn	—	2		18,935,000	971.48 (r)	2004	2023	Sheppard et al.		Retrograde irregular (Norse)	
S/2004 S 44		Saturn	—	2.5		19,515,400	1,014.98 (r)	2004	2023	Sheppard et al.		Retrograde irregular (Norse)	
S/2004 S 45		Saturn	—	2		19,693,600	1,058.95 (r)	2004	2023	Sheppard et al.		Retrograde irregular (Norse)	
S/2004 S 46		Saturn	—	1.5		20,513,000	1,107.57 (r)	2004	2023	Sheppard et al.		Retrograde irregular (Norse)	
S/2004 S 47		Saturn	—	2		16,050,600	755.69 (r)	2004	2023	Sheppard et al.		Retrograde irregular (Norse)	
S/2004 S 48		Saturn	—	2		22,136,700	1,248.52 (r)	2004	2023	Sheppard et al.		Retrograde irregular (Norse)	
S/2004 S 49		Saturn	—	2		22,399,700	1,290.34 (r)	2004	2023	Sheppard et al.		Retrograde irregular (Norse)	
S/2004 S 50		Saturn	—	1.5		22,346,000	1,219.11 (r)	2004	2023	Sheppard et al.		Retrograde irregular (Norse)	
S/2004 S 51		Saturn	—	2		25,208,200	1,544.65 (r)	2004	2023	Sheppard et al.		Retrograde irregular (Norse)	
S/2004 S 52		Saturn	—	1.5		26,448,100	1,573.49 (r)	2004	2023	Sheppard et al.		Retrograde irregular (Norse)	
S/2004 S 53		Saturn	—	2		23,279,800	1,367.72 (r)	2004	2023	Sheppard et al.		Retrograde irregular (Norse)	
S/2004 S 54		Saturn	—	2.0		11,265,600	446.42	2004	2025	Sheppard et al.		Prograde irregular (Inuit) (Kiviuq)	
S/2004 S 55		Saturn	—	1.5		11,319,500	449.63	2004	2025	Sheppard et al.		Prograde irregular (Inuit) (Kiviuq)	
S/2004 S 56		Saturn	—	2		13,661,000	596.13 (r)	2004	2025	Sheppard et al.		Retrograde irregular (Norse)	
S/2004 S 57		Saturn	—	1.5		18,119,300	910.59 (r)	2004	2025	Sheppard et al.		Retrograde irregular (Norse)	
S/2004 S 58		Saturn	—	2		18,170,500	914.46	2004	2025	Sheppard et al.		Prograde irregular (Inuit) (Siarnaq)	
S/2004 S 59		Saturn	—	1.5		19,099,100	985.45 (r)	2004	2025	Sheppard et al.		Retrograde irregular (Norse)	
S/2004 S 60		Saturn	—	1.5		19,420,700	1,010.44 (r)	2004	2025	Sheppard et al.		Retrograde irregular (Norse)	
S/2004 S 61		Saturn	—	1.5		20,893,400	1,127.53 (r)	2004	2025	Sheppard et al.		Retrograde irregular (Norse)	
S/2005 S 4		Saturn	—	2.5		11,324,500	448.63	2005	2023	Sheppard et al.		Prograde irregular (Inuit) (Kiviuq)	
S/2005 S 5		Saturn	—	1.5		21,366,200	1,138.62 (r)	2005	2023	Sheppard et al.		Retrograde irregular (Norse)	
S/2005 S 6		Saturn	—	1.5		17,931,200	896.45	2005	2025	Sheppard et al.		Prograde irregular (Inuit) (Siarnaq)	
S/2005 S 7		Saturn	—	1.5		18,734,500	957.36	2005	2025	Sheppard et al.		Prograde irregular (Gallic)	
S/2006 S 1		Saturn	—	3		18,790,000	963.37 (r)	2006	2006	Sheppard, Jewitt, Kleyna		Retrograde irregular (Norse)	
S/2006 S 3		Saturn	—	3		22,096,000	1,227.21 (r)	2006	2006	Sheppard, Jewitt, Kleyna		Retrograde irregular (Norse)	
S/2006 S 9		Saturn	—	1.5		14,406,600	648.71 (r)	2006	2023	Sheppard et al.		Retrograde irregular (Norse)	
S/2006 S 10		Saturn	—	1.5		18,979,900	965.26 (r)	2006	2023	Sheppard et al.		Retrograde irregular (Norse)	
S/2006 S 11		Saturn	—	1.5		19,711,900	1,018.45 (r)	2006	2023	Sheppard et al.		Retrograde irregular (Norse)	
S/2006 S 12		Saturn	—	2		19,569,800	1,043.16	2006	2023	Sheppard et al.		Prograde irregular (Gallic)	
S/2006 S 13		Saturn	—	2		19,953,800	1,061.74 (r)	2006	2023	Sheppard et al.		Retrograde irregular (Norse)	
S/2006 S 14		Saturn	—	1.5		21,062,100	1,150.64 (r)	2006	2023	Sheppard et al.		Retrograde irregular (Norse)	
S/2006 S 15		Saturn	—	2		21,799,400	1,183.57 (r)	2006	2023	Sheppard et al.		Retrograde irregular (Norse)	
S/2006 S 16		Saturn	—	1.5		21,720,700	1,217.36 (r)	2006	2023	Sheppard et al.		Retrograde irregular (Norse)	
S/2006 S 17		Saturn	—	2		22,384,900	1,262.48 (r)	2006	2023	Sheppard et al.		Retrograde irregular (Norse)	
S/2006 S 18		Saturn	—	2		22,760,700	1,324.09 (r)	2006	2023	Sheppard et al.		Retrograde irregular (Norse)	
S/2006 S 19		Saturn	—	2		23,801,100	1,324.68 (r)	2006	2023	Sheppard et al.		Retrograde irregular (Norse)	
S/2006 S 20		Saturn	—	2.5		13,193,800	563.89 (r)	2006	2023	Sheppard et al.		Retrograde irregular (Norse)	
S/2006 S 21		Saturn	—	1.5		15,047,400	689.14 (r)	2006	2025	Sheppard et al.		Retrograde irregular (Norse)	
S/2006 S 22		Saturn	—	1.5		15,139,000	695.44 (r)	2006	2025	Sheppard et al.		Retrograde irregular (Norse)	
S/2006 S 23		Saturn	—	1.5		18,176,200	914.89	2006	2025	Sheppard et al.		Prograde irregular (Inuit) (Siarnaq)	
S/2006 S 24		Saturn	—	1.0		18,143,200	912.4 (r)	2006	2025	Sheppard et al.		Retrograde irregular (Norse)	
S/2006 S 25		Saturn	—	1.5		18,384,900	930.69 (r)	2006	2025	Sheppard et al.		Retrograde irregular (Norse)	
S/2006 S 26		Saturn	—	1.5		18,655,900	951.35 (r)	2006	2025	Sheppard et al.		Retrograde irregular (Norse)	
S/2006 S 27		Saturn	—	1.5		19,422,100	1,010.55 (r)	2006	2025	Sheppard et al.		Retrograde irregular (Norse)	
S/2006 S 28		Saturn	—	1.5		22,361,800	1,248.46 (r)	2006	2025	Sheppard et al.		Retrograde irregular (Norse)	
S/2006 S 29		Saturn	—	1.5		25,925,400	1,558.48 (r)	2006	2025	Sheppard et al.		Retrograde irregular (Norse)	
S/2007 S 2		Saturn	—	3		16,725,000	808.08 (r)	2007	2007	Sheppard, Jewitt, Kleyna		Retrograde irregular (Norse)	
S/2007 S 3		Saturn	—	3		18,975,000	977.8 (r)	2007	2007	Sheppard, Jewitt, Kleyna		Retrograde irregular (Norse)	
S/2007 S 5		Saturn	—	2		15,835,700	748.50 (r)	2007	2023	Sheppard et al.		Retrograde irregular (Norse)	
S/2007 S 6		Saturn	—	1.5		18,544,900	944.31 (r)	2007	2023	Sheppard et al.		Retrograde irregular (Norse)	
S/2007 S 7		Saturn	—	2		15,931,700	742.79 (r)	2007	2023	Sheppard et al.		Retrograde irregular (Norse)	
S/2007 S 8		Saturn	—	2		17,049,000	826.94	2007	2023	Sheppard et al.		Prograde irregular (Gallic)	
S/2007 S 9		Saturn	—	2		20,174,600	1,099.69 (r)	2007	2023	Sheppard et al.		Retrograde irregular (Norse)	
S/2007 S 10		Saturn	—	2.0		11,380,300	453.26	2007	2025	Sheppard et al.		Prograde irregular (Inuit) (Kiviuq)	
S/2007 S 11		Saturn	—	1.5		17,602,900	871.95	2007	2025	Sheppard et al.		Prograde irregular (Gallic)	
S/2009 S 1		Saturn	—	0.15		116,900	0.472	2009	2009	Cassini Imaging Science Team Cassini–Huygens		B-ring moonlet	
S/2009 S 2		Saturn	—	–		117,059	0.473	2009	2026	Spitale (Cassini–Huygens)		B-ring moonlet	
S/2019 S 1		Saturn	—	3		11,221,000	443.8	2019	2021	Ashton, Gladman, Petit, Alexandersen		Prograde irregular (Inuit) (Kiviuq)	
S/2019 S 2		Saturn	—	1.5		16,559,900	796.22 (r)	2019	2023	Ashton et al.		Retrograde irregular (Norse)	
S/2019 S 3		Saturn	—	2		17,077,200	836.68 (r)	2019	2023	Ashton et al.		Retrograde irregular (Norse)	
S/2019 S 4		Saturn	—	1.5		17,956,700	898.40 (r)	2019	2023	Ashton et al.		Retrograde irregular (Norse)	
S/2019 S 5		Saturn	—	1.5		19,076,900	971.54 (r)	2019	2023	Ashton et al.		Retrograde irregular (Norse)	
S/2019 S 6		Saturn	—	2		18,198,700	905.41	2019	2023	Ashton et al.		Prograde irregular (Inuit) (Siarnaq)	
S/2019 S 7		Saturn	—	2		20,181,300	1,093.86 (r)	2019	2023	Ashton et al.		Retrograde irregular (Norse)	
S/2019 S 8		Saturn	—	2		20,284,400	1,080.60 (r)	2019	2023	Ashton et al.		Retrograde irregular (Norse)	
S/2019 S 9		Saturn	—	2		20,359,000	1,104.27 (r)	2019	2023	Ashton et al.		Retrograde irregular (Norse)	
S/2019 S 10		Saturn	—	1.5		20,713,400	1,129.53 (r)	2019	2023	Ashton et al.		Retrograde irregular (Norse)	
S/2019 S 11		Saturn	—	2		20,663,700	1,097.33 (r)	2019	2023	Ashton et al.		Retrograde irregular (Norse)	
S/2019 S 12		Saturn	—	2		20,904,500	1,130.40 (r)	2019	2023	Ashton et al.		Retrograde irregular (Norse)	
S/2019 S 13		Saturn	—	1.5		20,965,800	1,132.90 (r)	2019	2023	Ashton et al.		Retrograde irregular (Norse)	
S/2019 S 14		Saturn	—	2		17,853,000	902.00	2019	2023	Ashton et al.		Prograde irregular (Inuit) (Siarnaq)	
S/2019 S 15		Saturn	—	1.5		21,189,700	1,156.21 (r)	2019	2023	Ashton et al.		Retrograde irregular (Norse)	
S/2019 S 16		Saturn	—	1.5		23,266,700	1,360.26 (r)	2019	2023	Ashton et al.		Retrograde irregular (Norse)	
S/2019 S 17		Saturn	—	2		22,724,100	1,322.15 (r)	2019	2023	Ashton et al.		Retrograde irregular (Norse)	
S/2019 S 18		Saturn	—	1.5		23,140,700	1,349.74 (r)	2019	2023	Ashton et al.		Retrograde irregular (Norse)	
S/2019 S 19		Saturn	—	1.5		23,047,200	1,342.57 (r)	2019	2023	Ashton et al.		Retrograde irregular (Norse)	
S/2019 S 20		Saturn	—	1.5		23,678,600	1,343.58 (r)	2019	2023	Ashton et al.		Retrograde irregular (Norse)	
S/2019 S 21		Saturn	—	2		26,439,000	1,572.06 (r)	2019	2023	Ashton et al.		Retrograde irregular (Norse)	
S/2019 S 22		Saturn	—	1.5		11,280,600	447.31	2019	2025	Ashton et al.		Prograde irregular (Inuit) (Kiviuq)	
S/2019 S 23		Saturn	—	1.5		11,288,800	447.8	2019	2025	Ashton et al.		Prograde irregular (Inuit) (Kiviuq)	
S/2019 S 24		Saturn	—	2.0		11,361,100	452.11	2019	2025	Ashton et al.		Prograde irregular (Inuit) (Kiviuq)	
S/2019 S 25		Saturn	—	1.5		11,306,800	448.87	2019	2025	Ashton et al.		Prograde irregular (Inuit) (Kiviuq)	
S/2019 S 26		Saturn	—	1.5		11,401,300	454.51	2019	2025	Ashton et al.		Prograde irregular (Inuit) (Kiviuq)	
S/2019 S 27		Saturn	—	1.5		16,179,300	768.34 (r)	2019	2025	Ashton et al.		Retrograde irregular (Norse)	
S/2019 S 28		Saturn	—	1.5		17,684,100	877.99 (r)	2019	2025	Ashton et al.		Retrograde irregular (Norse)	
S/2019 S 29		Saturn	—	1.5		17,345,000	852.85	2019	2025	Ashton et al.		Prograde irregular (Gallic)	
S/2019 S 30		Saturn	—	1.0		17,828,600	888.77 (r)	2019	2025	Ashton et al.		Retrograde irregular (Norse)	
S/2019 S 31		Saturn	—	1.5		17,791,000	885.96	2019	2025	Ashton et al.		Prograde irregular (Gallic)	
S/2019 S 32		Saturn	—	2.0		17,712,200	880.08	2019	2025	Ashton et al.		Prograde irregular (Inuit) (Siarnaq)	
S/2019 S 33		Saturn	—	1.5		18,930,200	972.41 (r)	2019	2025	Ashton et al.		Retrograde irregular (Norse)	
S/2019 S 34		Saturn	—	1.5		18,317,400	925.57	2019	2025	Ashton et al.		Prograde irregular (Gallic)	
S/2019 S 35		Saturn	—	1.5		18,429,200	934.06 (r)	2019	2025	Ashton et al.		Retrograde irregular (Norse)	
S/2019 S 36		Saturn	—	1.0		20,076,300	1,062.04 (r)	2019	2025	Ashton et al.		Retrograde irregular (Norse)	
S/2019 S 37		Saturn	—	1.5		19,980,000	1,054.4 (r)	2019	2025	Ashton et al.		Retrograde irregular (Norse)	
S/2019 S 38		Saturn	—	1.5		22,356,200	1,247.99 (r)	2019	2025	Ashton et al.		Retrograde irregular (Norse)	
S/2019 S 39		Saturn	—	1.5		24,139,800	1,400.28 (r)	2019	2025	Ashton et al.		Retrograde irregular (Norse)	
S/2019 S 40		Saturn	—	1.5		24,549,100	1,436.04 (r)	2019	2025	Ashton et al.		Retrograde irregular (Norse)	
S/2019 S 41		Saturn	—	1.0		24,773,800	1,455.81 (r)	2019	2025	Ashton et al.		Retrograde irregular (Norse)	
S/2019 S 42		Saturn	—	2.0		23,850,100	1,375.15 (r)	2019	2025	Ashton et al.		Retrograde irregular (Norse)	
S/2019 S 43		Saturn	—	1.5		27,185,300	1,673.46 (r)	2019	2025	Ashton et al.		Retrograde irregular (Norse)	
S/2019 S 44		Saturn	—	1.5		26,083,200	1,572.74 (r)	2019	2025	Ashton et al.		Retrograde irregular (Norse)	
S/2020 S 1		Saturn	—	2		11,338,700	450.83	2020	2023	Ashton et al.		Prograde irregular (Inuit) (Kiviuq)	
S/2020 S 2		Saturn	—	1.5		17,869,300	907.00 (r)	2020	2023	Ashton et al.		Retrograde irregular (Norse)	
S/2020 S 3		Saturn	—	1.5		18,054,700	896.35	2020	2023	Ashton et al.		Prograde irregular (Inuit) (Siarnaq)	
S/2020 S 4		Saturn	—	1.5		18,235,500	910.34	2020	2023	Ashton et al.		Prograde irregular (Gallic)	
S/2020 S 5		Saturn	—	1.5		18,391,300	933.52	2020	2023	Ashton et al.		Prograde irregular (Inuit) (Siarnaq)	
S/2020 S 6		Saturn	—	1.5		21,265,300	1,149.11 (r)	2020	2023	Ashton et al.		Retrograde irregular (Norse)	
S/2020 S 7		Saturn	—	1.5		17,400,000	844.85 (r)	2020	2023	Ashton et al.		Retrograde irregular (Norse)	
S/2020 S 8		Saturn	—	1.5		21,966,700	1,201.72 (r)	2020	2023	Ashton et al.		Retrograde irregular (Norse)	
S/2020 S 9		Saturn	—	2		25,434,100	1,565.23 (r)	2020	2023	Ashton et al.		Retrograde irregular (Norse)	
S/2020 S 10		Saturn	—	1.5		25,314,800	1,479.87 (r)	2020	2023	Ashton et al.		Retrograde irregular (Norse)	
S/2020 S 11		Saturn	—	1.0		11,298,100	448.35	2020	2025	Ashton et al.		Prograde irregular (Inuit) (Kiviuq)	
S/2020 S 12		Saturn	—	1.0		11,330,300	450.27	2020	2025	Ashton et al.		Prograde irregular (Inuit) (Kiviuq)	
S/2020 S 13		Saturn	—	1.5		11,402,800	454.6	2020	2025	Ashton et al.		Prograde irregular (Inuit) (Kiviuq)	
S/2020 S 14		Saturn	—	1.5		16,078,400	761.16 (r)	2020	2025	Ashton et al.		Retrograde irregular (Norse)	
S/2020 S 15		Saturn	—	1.5		16,835,100	815.52	2020	2025	Ashton et al.		Prograde irregular (Gallic)	
S/2020 S 16		Saturn	—	1.5		17,123,200	836.55 (r)	2020	2025	Ashton et al.		Retrograde irregular (Norse)	
S/2020 S 17		Saturn	—	1.5		17,080,300	833.41 (r)	2020	2025	Ashton et al.		Retrograde irregular (Norse)	
S/2020 S 18		Saturn	—	1.5		17,780,100	885.15 (r)	2020	2025	Ashton et al.		Retrograde irregular (Norse)	
S/2020 S 19		Saturn	—	1.0		17,871,400	891.98	2020	2025	Ashton et al.		Prograde irregular (Inuit) (Siarnaq)	
S/2020 S 20		Saturn	—	1.5		18,133,100	911.64 (r)	2020	2025	Ashton et al.		Retrograde irregular (Norse)	
S/2020 S 21		Saturn	—	1.5		18,638,400	950.01 (r)	2020	2025	Ashton et al.		Retrograde irregular (Norse)	
S/2020 S 22		Saturn	—	1.5		19,230,200	995.61 (r)	2020	2025	Ashton et al.		Retrograde irregular (Norse)	
S/2020 S 23		Saturn	—	1.5		19,589,700	1,023.66 (r)	2020	2025	Ashton et al.		Retrograde irregular (Norse)	
S/2020 S 24		Saturn	—	1.0		20,633,100	1,106.53 (r)	2020	2025	Ashton et al.		Retrograde irregular (Norse)	
S/2020 S 25		Saturn	—	1.0		20,748,900	1,115.85 (r)	2020	2025	Ashton et al.		Retrograde irregular (Norse)	
S/2020 S 26		Saturn	—	1.5		21,541,200	1,180.37 (r)	2020	2025	Ashton et al.		Retrograde irregular (Norse)	
S/2020 S 27		Saturn	—	1.5		21,656,900	1,189.9 (r)	2020	2025	Ashton et al.		Retrograde irregular (Norse)	
S/2020 S 28		Saturn	—	1.5		22,512,300	1,261.08 (r)	2020	2025	Ashton et al.		Retrograde irregular (Norse)	
S/2020 S 29		Saturn	—	1.0		21,938,200	1,213.16 (r)	2020	2025	Ashton et al.		Retrograde irregular (Norse)	
S/2020 S 30		Saturn	—	1.5		21,351,300	1,164.79 (r)	2020	2025	Ashton et al.		Retrograde irregular (Norse)	
S/2020 S 31		Saturn	—	1.5		22,892,500	1,293.17 (r)	2020	2025	Ashton et al.		Retrograde irregular (Norse)	
S/2020 S 32		Saturn	—	1.5		21,397,500	1,168.58 (r)	2020	2025	Ashton et al.		Retrograde irregular (Norse)	
S/2020 S 33		Saturn	—	1.0		23,430,100	1,338.98 (r)	2020	2025	Ashton et al.		Retrograde irregular (Norse)	
S/2020 S 34		Saturn	—	1.5		22,873,000	1,291.52 (r)	2020	2025	Ashton et al.		Retrograde irregular (Norse)	
S/2020 S 35		Saturn	—	1.5		23,277,200	1,325.9 (r)	2020	2025	Ashton et al.		Retrograde irregular (Norse)	
S/2020 S 36		Saturn	—	1.5		23,272,100	1,325.46 (r)	2020	2025	Ashton et al.		Retrograde irregular (Norse)	
S/2020 S 37		Saturn	—	1.5		23,229,500	1,321.82 (r)	2020	2025	Ashton et al.		Retrograde irregular (Norse)	
S/2020 S 38		Saturn	—	2.0		23,609,000	1,354.35 (r)	2020	2025	Ashton et al.		Retrograde irregular (Norse)	
S/2020 S 39		Saturn	—	1.5		24,697,100	1,449.05 (r)	2020	2025	Ashton et al.		Retrograde irregular (Norse)	
S/2020 S 40		Saturn	—	1.5		23,311,800	1,328.86 (r)	2020	2025	Ashton et al.		Retrograde irregular (Norse)	
S/2020 S 41		Saturn	—	1.5		25,397,200	1,511.1 (r)	2020	2025	Ashton et al.		Retrograde irregular (Norse)	
S/2020 S 42		Saturn	—	1.5		24,750,100	1,453.72 (r)	2020	2025	Ashton et al.		Retrograde irregular (Norse)	
S/2020 S 43		Saturn	—	1.0		26,232,300	1,586.24 (r)	2020	2025	Ashton et al.		Retrograde irregular (Norse)	
S/2020 S 44		Saturn	—	1.0		28,043,800	1,753.36 (r)	2020	2025	Ashton et al.		Retrograde irregular (Norse)	
S/2023 S 1		Saturn	—	1.5		11,207,800	442.99	2023	2025	Ashton et al.		Prograde irregular (Inuit) (Kiviuq)	
S/2023 S 2		Saturn	—	1.5		11,310,900	449.12	2023	2025	Ashton et al.		Prograde irregular (Inuit) (Kiviuq)	
S/2023 S 3		Saturn	—	1.5		17,617,600	873.04	2023	2025	Ashton et al.		Prograde irregular (Inuit) (Siarnaq)	
S/2023 S 4		Saturn	—	1.5		17,945,800	897.55 (r)	2023	2025	Ashton et al.		Retrograde irregular (Norse)	
S/2023 S 5		Saturn	—	1.5		25,010,600	1,476.73 (r)	2023	2025	Ashton et al.		Retrograde irregular (Norse)	
S/2023 S 6		Saturn	—	1.5		11,090,800	436.07	2023	2025	Ashton et al.		Prograde irregular (Inuit) (Kiviuq)	
S/2023 S 7		Saturn	—	2.0		11,725,400	474.03	2023	2025	Ashton et al.		Prograde irregular (Inuit) (Kiviuq)	
S/2023 S 8		Saturn	—	1.5		14,327,600	640.29 (r)	2023	2025	Ashton et al.		Retrograde irregular (Norse)	
S/2023 S 9		Saturn	—	1.5		15,108,800	693.36 (r)	2023	2025	Ashton et al.		Retrograde irregular (Norse)	
S/2023 S 10		Saturn	—	1.5		15,426,700	715.36 (r)	2023	2025	Ashton et al.		Retrograde irregular (Norse)	
S/2023 S 11		Saturn	—	1.0		15,041,200	688.71 (r)	2023	2025	Ashton et al.		Retrograde irregular (Norse)	
S/2023 S 12		Saturn	—	1.0		15,806,900	741.97 (r)	2023	2025	Ashton et al.		Retrograde irregular (Norse)	
S/2023 S 13		Saturn	—	1.5		16,343,300	780.05 (r)	2023	2025	Ashton et al.		Retrograde irregular (Norse)	
S/2023 S 14		Saturn	—	1.0		17,170,800	840.04 (r)	2023	2025	Ashton et al.		Retrograde irregular (Norse)	
S/2023 S 15		Saturn	—	1.0		17,560,100	868.77 (r)	2023	2025	Ashton et al.		Retrograde irregular (Norse)	
S/2023 S 16		Saturn	—	1.0		17,246,200	845.58 (r)	2023	2025	Ashton et al.		Retrograde irregular (Norse)	
S/2023 S 17		Saturn	—	1.0		17,340,200	852.5	2023	2025	Ashton et al.		Prograde irregular (Gallic)	
S/2023 S 18		Saturn	—	1.0		17,229,200	844.33	2023	2025	Ashton et al.		Prograde irregular (Gallic)	
S/2023 S 19		Saturn	—	1.0		17,464,000	861.64	2023	2025	Ashton et al.		Prograde irregular (Inuit) (Siarnaq)	
S/2023 S 20		Saturn	—	1.5		18,004,000	901.92 (r)	2023	2025	Ashton et al.		Retrograde irregular (Norse)	
S/2023 S 21		Saturn	—	1.0		18,624,800	948.97 (r)	2023	2025	Ashton et al.		Retrograde irregular (Norse)	
S/2023 S 22		Saturn	—	1.5		18,428,000	933.97	2023	2025	Ashton et al.		Prograde irregular (Inuit) (Siarnaq)	
S/2023 S 23		Saturn	—	1.5		19,212,500	994.23 (r)	2023	2025	Ashton et al.		Retrograde irregular (Norse)	
S/2023 S 24		Saturn	—	1.5		19,340,900	1,004.22 (r)	2023	2025	Ashton et al.		Retrograde irregular (Norse)	
S/2023 S 25		Saturn	—	1.0		19,736,100	1,035.16 (r)	2023	2025	Ashton et al.		Retrograde irregular (Norse)	
S/2023 S 26		Saturn	—	1.0		20,308,700	1,080.53 (r)	2023	2025	Ashton et al.		Retrograde irregular (Norse)	
S/2023 S 27		Saturn	—	1.5		19,613,700	1,025.54 (r)	2023	2025	Ashton et al.		Retrograde irregular (Norse)	
S/2023 S 28		Saturn	—	1.0		20,032,700	1,058.58 (r)	2023	2025	Ashton et al.		Retrograde irregular (Norse)	
S/2023 S 29		Saturn	—	1.5		20,783,300	1,118.63 (r)	2023	2025	Ashton et al.		Retrograde irregular (Norse)	
S/2023 S 30		Saturn	—	1.5		21,318,800	1,162.14 (r)	2023	2025	Ashton et al.		Retrograde irregular (Norse)	
S/2023 S 31		Saturn	—	1.0		21,210,600	1,153.31 (r)	2023	2025	Ashton et al.		Retrograde irregular (Norse)	
S/2023 S 32		Saturn	—	1.0		21,035,300	1,139.03 (r)	2023	2025	Ashton et al.		Retrograde irregular (Norse)	
S/2023 S 33		Saturn	—	1.0		20,754,100	1,116.27 (r)	2023	2025	Ashton et al.		Retrograde irregular (Norse)	
S/2023 S 34		Saturn	—	1.5		21,370,100	1,166.33 (r)	2023	2025	Ashton et al.		Retrograde irregular (Norse)	
S/2023 S 35		Saturn	—	1.0		21,972,400	1,215.99 (r)	2023	2025	Ashton et al.		Retrograde irregular (Norse)	
S/2023 S 36		Saturn	—	1.0		21,856,400	1,206.38 (r)	2023	2025	Ashton et al.		Retrograde irregular (Norse)	
S/2023 S 37		Saturn	—	1.0		21,949,400	1,214.09 (r)	2023	2025	Ashton et al.		Retrograde irregular (Norse)	
S/2023 S 38		Saturn	—	1.0		21,849,300	1,205.78 (r)	2023	2025	Ashton et al.		Retrograde irregular (Norse)	
S/2023 S 39		Saturn	—	1.0		22,078,600	1,224.82 (r)	2023	2025	Ashton et al.		Retrograde irregular (Norse)	
S/2023 S 40		Saturn	—	1.0		22,318,600	1,244.84 (r)	2023	2025	Ashton et al.		Retrograde irregular (Norse)	
S/2023 S 41		Saturn	—	1.5		22,335,800	1,246.28 (r)	2023	2025	Ashton et al.		Retrograde irregular (Norse)	
S/2023 S 42		Saturn	—	1.5		22,403,800	1,251.98 (r)	2023	2025	Ashton et al.		Retrograde irregular (Norse)	
S/2023 S 43		Saturn	—	1.5		23,496,200	1,344.65 (r)	2023	2025	Ashton et al.		Retrograde irregular (Norse)	
S/2023 S 44		Saturn	—	1.5		26,287,700	1,591.27 (r)	2023	2025	Ashton et al.		Retrograde irregular (Norse)	
S/2023 S 45		Saturn	—	1.0		23,419,900	1,338.11 (r)	2023	2025	Ashton et al.		Retrograde irregular (Norse)	
S/2023 S 46		Saturn	—	1.0		25,366,500	1,508.36 (r)	2023	2025	Ashton et al.		Retrograde irregular (Norse)	
S/2023 S 47		Saturn	—	1.0		26,653,400	1,624.59 (r)	2023	2025	Ashton et al.		Retrograde irregular (Norse)	
S/2023 S 48		Saturn	—	1.5		20,439,300	1,090.97 (r)	2023	2025	Ashton et al.		Retrograde irregular (Norse)	
S/2023 S 49		Saturn	—	1.5		22,042,000	1,221.77 (r)	2023	2025	Ashton et al.		Retrograde irregular (Norse)	
S/2023 S 50		Saturn	—	1.0		17,611,300	872.57 (r)	2023	2025	Ashton et al.		Retrograde irregular (Norse)	
**Ariel**		Uranus	I (1)	578.9±0.6		190,900	2.520	1851	1851	Lassell	14.8	Main-group moon	
**Umbriel**		Uranus	II (2)	582.4±0.8		266,000	4.144	1851	1851	Lassell	15.1	Main-group moon	
**Titania**		Uranus	III (3)	788.9±1.8		436,300	8.706	1787	1787	Herschel	13.9	Main-group moon	
**Oberon**		Uranus	IV (4)	761.4±2.6		583,500	13.46	1787	1787	Herschel	14.1	Main-group moon	
**Miranda**		Uranus	V (5)	235.8±0.7		129,900	1.413	1948	1949	Kuiper	16.6	Main-group moon	
Cordelia		Uranus	VI (6)	20.1±3		49,800	0.335	1986	1986	Terrile (Voyager 2)	23.6	Inner moon (shepherd)	
Ophelia		Uranus	VII (7)	21.4±4		53,800	0.376	1986	1986	Terrile (Voyager 2)	23.3	Inner moon (shepherd)	
Bianca		Uranus	VIII (8)	25.7±2		59,200	0.435	1986	1986	Smith (Voyager 2)	22.5	Inner moon	
Cressida		Uranus	IX (9)	39.8±2		61,800	0.464	1986	1986	Synnott (Voyager 2)	21.6	Inner moon	
Desdemona		Uranus	X (10)	32±4		62,700	0.474	1986	1986	Synnott (Voyager 2)	22.0	Inner moon	
Juliet		Uranus	XI (11)	46.8±4		64,400	0.493	1986	1986	Synnott (Voyager 2)	21.1	Inner moon	
Portia		Uranus	XII (12)	67.6±4.0		66,100	0.513	1986	1986	Synnott (Voyager 2)	20.4	Inner moon	
Rosalind		Uranus	XIII (13)	36±6		69,900	0.558	1986	1986	Synnott (Voyager 2)	21.8	Inner moon	
Belinda		Uranus	XIV (14)	40.3±8		75,300	0.624	1986	1986	Synnott (Voyager 2)	21.5	Inner moon	
Puck		Uranus	XV (15)	81±2		86,000	0.762	1985	1986	Synnott (Voyager 2)	20.5	Inner moon	
Caliban		Uranus	XVI (16)	36.4		7,231,100	579.73 (r)	1997	1997	Gladman, Nicholson, Burns, Kavelaars	22.0	Retrograde irregular (Caliban)	
Sycorax		Uranus	XVII (17)	93		12,179,400	1,288.38 (r)	1997	1997	Gladman, Nicholson, Burns, Kavelaars	20.8	Retrograde irregular	
Prospero		Uranus	XVIII (18)	25		16,256,000	1,978.29 (r)	1999	1999	Gladman, Holman, Kavelaars, Petit, Scholl	23.2	Retrograde irregular	
Setebos		Uranus	XIX (19)	24		17,418,000	2,225.21 (r)	1999	1999	Gladman, Holman, Kavelaars, Petit, Scholl	23.3	Retrograde irregular	
Stephano		Uranus	XX (20)	16		8,004,000	677.36 (r)	1999	1999	Gladman, Holman, Kavelaars, Petit, Scholl	24.1	Retrograde irregular (Caliban)	
Trinculo		Uranus	XXI (21)	9.5		8,504,000	749.24 (r)	2001	2002	Holman, Kavelaars, Milisavljevic	25.4	Retrograde irregular	
Francisco		Uranus	XXII (22)	11		4,276,000	266.56 (r)	2001	2003	Holman, Kavelaars, Milisavljevic, Gladman	25.0	Retrograde irregular	
Margaret		Uranus	XXIII (23)	10		14,345,000	1,687.01	2003	2003	Sheppard, Jewitt	25.2	Prograde irregular	
Ferdinand		Uranus	XXIV (24)	10		20,901,000	2,887.21 (r)	2001	2003	Holman, Kavelaars, Milisavljevic, et al.	25.1	Retrograde irregular	
Perdita		Uranus	XXV (25)	15		76,417	0.638	1986	1999/2003	Karkoschka (Voyager 2)	23.6	Inner moon	
Mab		Uranus	XXVI (26)	12		97,736	0.923	2003	2003	Showalter, Lissauer	26	Inner moon	
Cupid		Uranus	XXVII (27)	9		74,392	0.613	2003	2003	Showalter, Lissauer	25.8	Inner moon	
S/2025 U 1		Uranus	XXVIII (28)	4–5		56250 ± 250	0.402	2025	2025	El Moutamid et al.	25.5	Inner moon	
S/2023 U 1		Uranus	―	4		7,978,000	680.76 (r)	2023	2024	Sheppard	26.7	Retrograde irregular (Caliban)	
**Triton**		Neptune	I (1)	1352.6±2.4	21390	354800	5,879 (r)	1846	1846	Lassell	13.47	Retrograde irregular	
Nereid		Neptune	II (2)	167.5–172.5		5513900	360.13	1949	1949	Kuiper	19.2	Prograde irregular	
Naiad		Neptune	III (3)	33±3	0.0012	48300	0.295	1989	1989	Terrile (Voyager 2)	23.91	Inner moon	
Thalassa		Neptune	IV (4)	41±3	0.0035	50100	0.311	1989	1989	Terrile (Voyager 2)	23.32	Inner moon	
Despina		Neptune	V (5)	75±3		52600	0.334	1989	1989	Synnott (Voyager 2)	22.0	Inner moon	
Galatea		Neptune	VI (6)	89±4	0.0212	62000	0.429	1989	1989	Synnott (Voyager 2)	21.9	Inner moon	
Larissa		Neptune	VII (7)	97±3		73600	0.554	1981/1989	1981/1989	Reitsema, Hubbard, Lebofsky, Tholen (Voyager 2)	21.5	Inner moon	
Proteus		Neptune	VIII (8)	210±7		117700	1.122	1989	1989	Synnott (Voyager 2)	19.7	Inner moon	
Halimede		Neptune	IX (9)	30.5		16590500	1879 (r)	2002	2003	Holman, Kavelaars, Grav, Fraser, Milisavljevic	24.5	Retrograde irregular	
Psamathe		Neptune	X (10)	19		47646600	9149 (r)	2003	2003	Jewitt, Kleyna, Sheppard, Holman, Kavelaars	25.5	Retrograde irregular (Neso)	
Sao		Neptune	XI (11)	20		22239900	2919	2002	2003	Holman, Kavelaars, Grav, Fraser, Milisavljevic	25.5	Prograde irregular (Sao)	
Laomedeia		Neptune	XII (12)	20		23499900	3168	2002	2003	Holman, Kavelaars, Grav, Fraser, Milisavljevic	25.5	Prograde irregular (Sao)	
Neso		Neptune	XIII (13)	30		49897800	9805 (r)	2002	2003	Holman, Kavelaars, Grav, Fraser, Milisavljevic	25.6	Retrograde irregular (Neso)	
Hippocamp		Neptune	XIV (14)	17.4±2.0		105300	0.950	2004/2013	2013	Showalter et al.	26.5	Inner moon	
S/2002 N 5		Neptune	—	19		23414700	3151	2002	2024	Holman, Kavelaars, Grav, Fraser	25.9	Prograde irregular (Sao)	
S/2021 N 1		Neptune	—	12.5		50700200	10043 (r)	2021	2024	Sheppard, Tholen, Trujillo, Lykawka	27	Retrograde irregular (Neso)	
Vanth		Orcus	I (1)	221.25±5.2	0.87	9000±9	9.539	2005	2007	Brown & Suer	21.8	Synchronous rotation (Binary)	
**Charon**		Pluto	I (1)	606±0.5	1.589	19595	6.387	1978	1978	Christy	16.8	Synchronous rotation (Binary)	
Nix		Pluto	II (2)	18.5	0.0026	48694	24.85	2005	2005	Weaver, Stern, Buie, et al.	23.37 to 23.7	Chaotic rotation	
Hydra		Pluto	III (3)	19	0.0030	64738	38.20	2005	2005	Weaver, Stern, Buie, et al.	22.9 to 23.3	Chaotic rotation	
Kerberos		Pluto	IV (4)	7		58280	32.17	2011	2011	Showalter (Hubble)	26.1	Chaotic rotation	
Styx		Pluto	V (5)	5.5		43172	20.16	2012	2012	Showalter (Hubble)	27	Chaotic rotation	
Hiʻiaka		Haumea	I (1)	185±10	0.162	49371±45	49.462	2005	2005	Brown et al.	19.8	non Synchronous rotation	
Namaka		Haumea	II (2)	75±25	0.011	25506±36	18.2783	2005	2005	Brown et al.	22	likely chaotic rotation	
Weywot		Quaoar	I (1)	73±5	1.485	13329±19	12.438	2006	2007	Brown	24.5	Synchronous rotation (Binary)	
S/2015 (136472) 1		Makemake	—	87.5		22250±780	18.023	2015	2016	Parker et al.	25.0	(Binary)	
Xiangliu		Gonggong	I (1)	<100		24020±200	25.221	2010	2016	Marton, Kiss & Müller		assuming a prograde orbit	
Dysnomia		Eris	I (1)	307.5+30 −25	0.82	37273±64	15.786	2005	2005	Brown, Rabinowitz, Trujillo et al.	25.4	Synchronous rotation (Binary)	

== See also ==
- Exomoon
- List of exomoon candidates
- Lists of exoplanets
- List of dwarf planets
- List of Solar System objects by size
- List of Solar System objects most distant from the Sun
- List of black holes
- Lists of stars
- Lists of stars by constellation
- List of IAU designated constellations
- List of multiplanetary systems
- List of galaxies
- List of largest cosmic structures
- Lists of astronomical objects
