= Albiorix =

Albiorix may refer to:

- Albiorix (Gaulish deity) often associated with the god Mars
- A Celtic theonym that appears as an epithet of the Roman Mars
- Albiorix (moon), a satellite of Saturn
- Albiorix (arachnid), a genus of arachnids in the family Ideoroncidae
