= List of named Solar System objects =

Lists of named objects in the Solar System include:

- List of gravitationally rounded objects in the Solar System (planets, dwarf planets and stars)
- List of named minor planets
  - ... in alphabetical order
  - ... in numerical order
- List of natural satellites (moons)
