= S/2006 S 12 =

Moon of Saturn

Discovery
- Discovered by: Scott S. Sheppard, David C. Jewitt, Jan Kleyna, Brett J. Gladman, E. Ashton
- Discovery date: 2006

Orbital characteristics
- Semi-major axis: 19,569,800 km (12,160,100 mi)
- Eccentricity: 0.542
- Orbital period (sidereal): 2.834 yrs (1,035.05 d)
- Inclination: 38.6° (to the ecliptic)
- Satellite of: Saturn
- Group: Gallic group?

Physical characteristics
- Mean diameter: 4 km
- Absolute magnitude (H): 16.2

S/2006 S 12 is a small and faint natural satellite of Saturn. Its discovery was announced by Scott S. Sheppard, David C. Jewitt, Jan Kleyna, E. Ashton and Brett J. Gladman on May 7, 2023 from observations taken between January 5, 2006 and July 8, 2021.

== Physical characteristics, orbit and origin ==
S/2006 S 12 orbits Saturn at an average distance of 19.569 million km in 1,043.16 days, at an inclination of 39.03, orbits in a prograde direction and with an eccentricity of 0.542. S/2006 S 12 belongs to the Gallic group. Scott S. Sheppard suggests that it is uncertain whether S/2006 S 12 belongs to the Gallic group or is an outlier like S/2004 S 24, but a later study from Edward Ashton suggests that it is related to Albiorix.

S/2006 S 12 is estimated to be about 4 kilometers in diameter.
