= Gallic group =

Category of satellites of Saturn

Animation of Saturn's Gallic group of satellites Saturn Albiorix · Bebhionn · Erriapus · Tarvos

268 irregular moons of Saturn plotted by semi-major axis and inclination as of April 2026. The Gallic group is the yellow cluster of moons on the right, with the outlier S/2004 S 24 colored green.

The Gallic group (or family or cluster; also referred to as the first inclination group, the 34° inclination cluster, the Albiorix family, or the Gaulish cluster) is a dynamical grouping of prograde irregular satellites of Saturn. They are thought to have a common origin in a captured asteroid that was later involved in a collision, making them a likely collisional family. Most of the moons follow similar orbits, although one moon, S/2004 S 24, has a much higher semi-major axis and a much lower eccentricity than the others, so it is not known whether it originated from the same parent body as the rest of the group.

== Naming ==
The International Astronomical Union (IAU) reserves names taken from Gallic mythology for these moons, though only four of them have names at present.

The discovery of 20 new moons of Saturn was announced in October 2019 by a team led by Scott S. Sheppard using the Subaru Telescope at Mauna Kea. One of them, S/2004 S 24, is also prograde and of similar inclination, but it orbits much further away from Saturn than the other Gallic moons. This moon will nevertheless also receive a name from Gallic mythology.

== Characteristics ==
=== Physical characteristics ===
Similar mean orbital elements led the discoverers to postulate a common origin for the group in a breakup of a larger body. The group was later found to be physically homogeneous, all satellites displaying light-red colour (colour indices B − V = 0.91 and V − R = 0.48) and similar infrared indices.

Later observations revealed that the largest member of the group, Albiorix, actually displays two different colours: one compatible with Erriapus and Tarvos, and another less red. Rather than directly originating from the common progenitor, it was postulated that Tarvos and Erriapus could instead be fragments of Albiorix, leaving a large, less red crater. Such an impact would require a body with the diameter in excess of 1.25 km and relative velocity of 4.79 km/s, resulting in a large crater with a radius of 12 km. Numerous, very large craters observed on Phoebe (an irregular moon in the Norse group) prove the existence of such collisions in the Saturnian system's past.

=== Orbital characteristics ===
The Gallic group is not centred on Albiorix, the largest moon in the group. Within the group, relative to Albiorix, all other moons orbit at a larger distance, and almost all of them have greater inclinations. The eccentricity somewhat increases with semi-major axis. The semi-major axes mostly range between 16 and 20 million km, their inclinations between 34° and 41°, and their eccentricities between 0.44 and 0.57. The semi major-axes are much more spread out than the inclinations or eccentricities.

The Gallic group has a moderately large orbital spread. In addition, it is unusual in that it has several large or medium size moons in the group, and fewer smaller members. This has cast some doubt on whether it is a true dynamical family. A study found the group is unlikely to have a shared collisional origin, unless the fragments were ejected in an asymmetric manner, and/or some other mechanism later modified the moons' semi-major axes.

If the progenitor moon suffered a head-on collision, it would have caused the fragments to gain a relative velocity boost in the direction of movement, producing larger semi-major axes. An impact on the leading-hemisphere of the object would be a likely event due to the large number of retrograde moons in the Saturnian system. A study simulated the head-on collision scenario and found that it was plausible. However, the dispersion velocities only fit realistic ranges when S/2004 S 24 was excluded from the group. This caused them to propose alternative explanations for the moon. S/2004 S 24 may have been created from a secondary collision from when one of the Gallic moons was impacted while near the farthest point of its orbit, or it may not be related to the group entirely, with its similar inclination being a coincidence.

Another study found that the Gallic group may have been affected by the near-orbital resonance between Jupiter and Saturn known as the Great Inequality. Rather than causing the moons to spread out, however, it may have depleted the population instead. Most of the original fragments would have been eliminated, with the present-day members being the few survivors, having left the resonance before being destabilized.

== List ==
The 19 members of the group are (in order by date announcement):

Name	Diameter (km)	Semi-Major Axis (km)	Period (days)	Subgroup
Tarvos	16	18215600	926.43	Albiorix
Erriapus	12	17507000	871.09	Albiorix
Albiorix	28.6	16329100	783.46	Albiorix
Bebhionn	7	17027200	834.85	Albiorix
S/2004 S 24	3	23339000	1341.34	Outlier
S/2004 S 29	5	17064100	837.78	Albiorix
S/2020 S 4	3	18236000	926.96	Albiorix
S/2006 S 12	4	19569800	1035.06	Albiorix
S/2007 S 8	4	17049000	836.90	Albiorix
S/2005 S 7	3	18502500	939.75	Albiorix
S/2007 S 11	4	17434400	859.53	Albiorix
S/2019 S 29	3	17353900	853.62	Albiorix
S/2019 S 31	3	17739100	882.24	Albiorix
S/2019 S 34	3	18446800	935.45	Albiorix
S/2020 S 15	3	16729200	807.82	Albiorix
S/2023 S 17	3	17385300	855.94	Albiorix
S/2023 S 18	3	17381700	855.65	Albiorix
S/2023 S 54	3	17485100	863.35	Albiorix
S/2023 S 55	3	16875100	818.51	Albiorix

== See also ==
- List of natural satellites
