= Erriapus =

Moon of Saturn

- Discovery images of Erriapus taken by the CFHT in September 2000

Discovery
- Discovered by: John J. Kavelaars et al.
- Discovery date: 2000

Designations
- Designation: Saturn XXVIII
- Pronunciation: /ɛriˈæpəs/
- Named after: Erriap(p)us
- Alternative names: S/2000 S 10

Orbital characteristics
- Epoch 2000 January 1.5
- Semi-major axis: 17 506 900 km
- Eccentricity: 0.475
- Orbital period (sidereal): 864.92 d (2.37 yr)
- Inclination: 37.1
- Satellite of: Saturn
- Group: Gallic group

Physical characteristics
- Dimensions: 16.30 × 10 × 6.34 km (Note: Assuming the medium axis is equal to the diameter calculated from the assumed albedo.)
- Mean diameter: 10+50% −30% km
- Synodic rotation period: 28.15±0.25 h
- Albedo: <0.15 <0.10 (likely); 0.06 (assumed)
- Spectral type: D
- Apparent magnitude: 23.0
- Absolute magnitude (H): 13.7

Erriapus /ɛriˈæpəs/, also known as Saturn XXVIII, is one of the mid-sized irregular moons of Saturn.

== Discovery and naming ==
It was discovered by Brett Gladman, John J. Kavelaars and colleagues in 2000, and given the temporary designation S/2000 S 10.

It was named Erriapo in August 2003 after Erriapus (also rendered Erriappus), a giant in Gaulish mythology; the name was changed from dative Erriapo to nominative Erriapus per IAU conventions in late 2007.

== Orbit ==
The diagram illustrates the orbit from erriapus in relation to other prograde irregular satellites of Saturn. The eccentricity of the orbits is represented by the yellow segments extending from the pericentre to the apocentre.

Erriapus orbits Saturn at an average distance of 17,5 million kilometers in 864,92 days, at an inclination of about 37° to the ecliptic, in a prograde direction. eccentricity amounts to of 0.475. Its orbit is continuously changing due to solar and planetary perturbations.

Erriapus belongs to the Gallic group, a prograde group of moons orbiting between 16 and 23 million km from Saturn at an inclinations between 34 and 41°, and eccentricities between 0.07 and 0.56.

== Physical characteristics ==
With an assumed albedo of 6%, its average diameter is estimated at about 10 kilometers.

Erriapus is red in color (B−V=0.83, R−V=0.49) similar to the other members of the Gallic group.

The rotation period was measured by the ISS camera of the Cassini spacecraft to 28 hours and 9 minutes. which is relatively slow compared to other irregular moons of Saturn with known rotation periods. Is thought to rotate on its side, giving it similar seasons to those of Uranus.

The Erriapus lightcurves show large brightness variations, indicative of an elongated or possibly contact-binary object.

== Origin ==
Erriapus probably did not form near Saturn but was captured by Saturn later. Like the other members of the Gallic group, which have similar orbits, Erriapus is probably the remnant of a broken, captured heliocentric asteroid.

Remarkably, recent observations revealed that the largest member of the group, Albiorix, actually displays two different colours: one compatible with Erriapus and Tarvos, and another less red. Instead of the common progenitor, it was postulated that Tarvos and Erriapus could be fragments of Albiorix.

== Exploration ==
Erriapus was observed by the Cassini spacecraft, during which time its light curve was measured and its rotation period determined.
