= Atlas (moon) =

Moon of Saturn

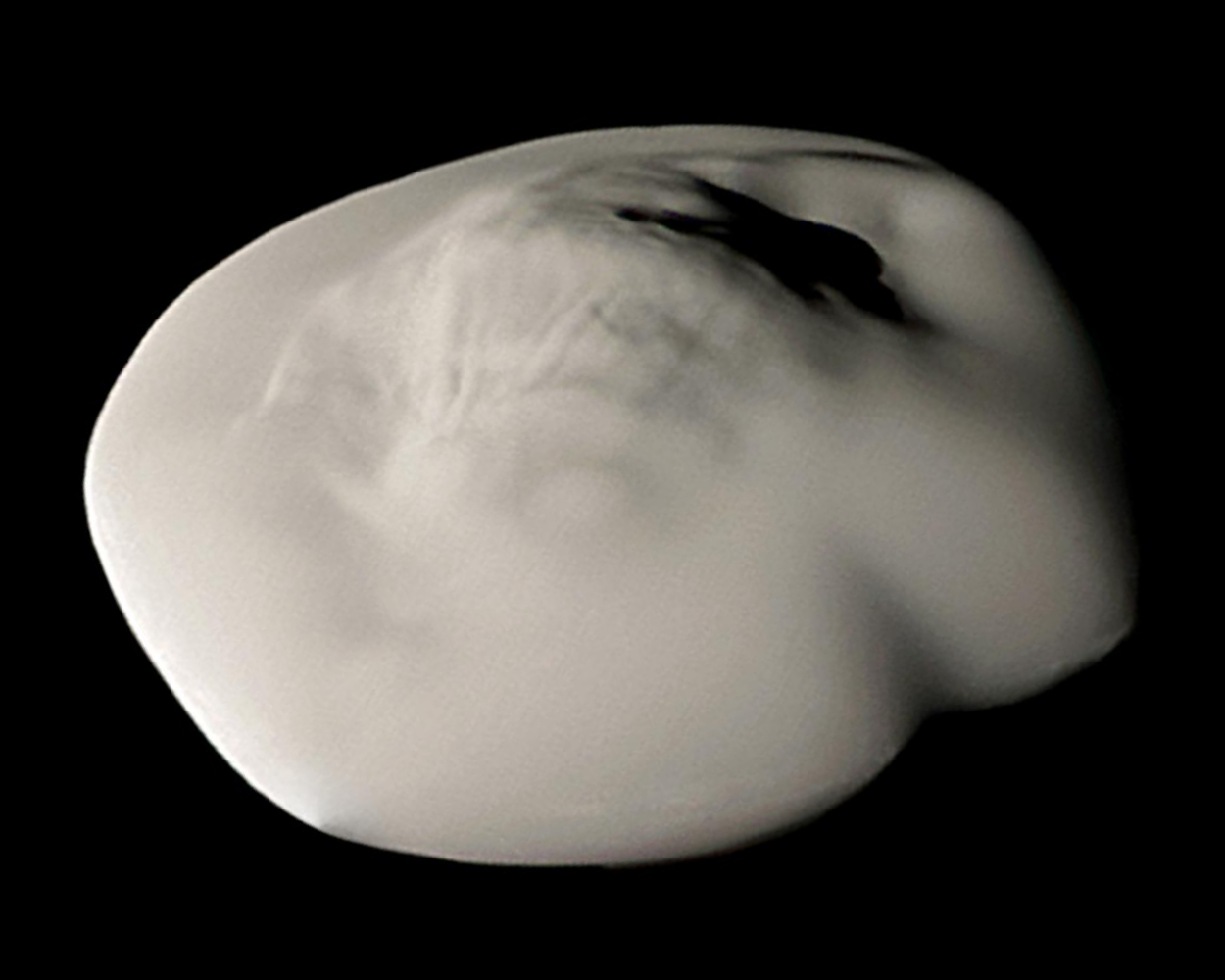
- Enhanced color photo taken by Cassini on 12 April 2017

Discovery
- Discovered by: Terrile, Voyager 1
- Discovery date: October, 1980

Designations
- Designation: Saturn XV
- Pronunciation: /ˈætləs/
- Named after: Ἄτλας Ātlās
- Alternative names: S/1980 S 28
- Adjectives: Atlantean /ætlænˈtiːən/

Orbital characteristics
- Mean orbit radius: 137666 km
- Eccentricity: 0.00116
- Orbital period (sidereal): 0.601693 d
- Inclination: 0.003°
- Satellite of: Saturn

Physical characteristics
- Dimensions: 40.8 × 35.4 × 18.6 km (± 0.2 × 0.4 × 0.6 km)
- Mean diameter: 29.8±0.4 km
- Volume: 13950±50 km^{3}
- Mass: (5.490±0.042)×10^{15} kg (Note: Calculated from the standard gravitational parameter GM = (3.664±0.028)×10^{−4} km^{3}·s^{–2} given by Lainey et al. (2023), divided by the gravitational constant G = 6.6743×10^{−2} km^{3}·kg^{–1}·s^{–2}.)
- Mean density: 0.3935±0.0033 g/cm^{3}
- Surface gravity: 0.0001–0.0017 m/s^{2}
- Escape velocity: 0.006 km/s at longest axis to 0.009 km/s at poles
- Synodic rotation period: synchronous
- Axial tilt: assumed zero
- Albedo: 0.82±0.13 (geometric)
- Temperature: 82±5 K

Atlas is an inner satellite of Saturn which was discovered by Richard Terrile in 1980 from Voyager photos and was designated S/1980 S 28. In 1983, it was officially named after Atlas of Greek mythology, because it "holds the rings on its shoulders" like the Titan Atlas held the sky up above the Earth. It is also designated Saturn XV.

Atlas is the closest satellite to the sharp outer edge of the A ring, and was long thought to be a shepherd satellite for this ring (which was probably the reason for its name). However, now it is known that the outer edge of the ring is instead maintained by a 7:6 orbital resonance with the larger but more distant moons Janus and Epimetheus. In 2004 a faint, thin ring, temporarily designated R/2004 S 1, was discovered in the Atlantean orbit.

Atlas is significantly perturbed by Prometheus and to a lesser degree by Pandora, leading to excursions in longitude of up to 600 km (~0.25°) away from the precessing Keplerian orbit with a rough period of about 3 years. The orbit of Atlas is chaotic, with a Lyapunov time of 10 years.

== Physical characteristics ==
High-resolution images taken in June 2005 by Cassini revealed Atlas to have a roughly spherical centre surrounded by a large, smooth equatorial ridge. The most likely explanation for this unusual and prominent structure is that ring material swept up by the moon accumulates on the moon, with a strong preference for the equator due to the ring's thinness. The size of the equatorial ridge is comparable with the expected Roche lobe of the moon, which means that for any additional particles impacting the equator, the centrifugal force will nearly overcome Atlas's tiny gravity, and they will probably be lost.

The equatorial ridge is large and roughly polygonal in shape, extending 20–50° from the equator and comprising about 25% of the total volume of Atlas. The ridge is completely smooth down to available resolution of imagery, and there is a smooth transition between it and the core section of Atlas.

== Gallery ==
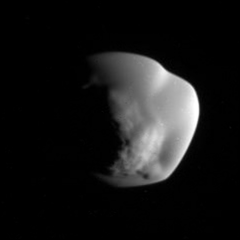
Atlas from above its south pole (June 12, 2007)

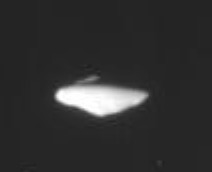
Atlas - Cassini
(June 8, 2005).

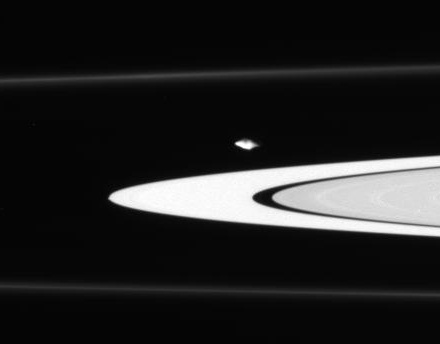
Atlas - A and F rings
(June 30, 2006).

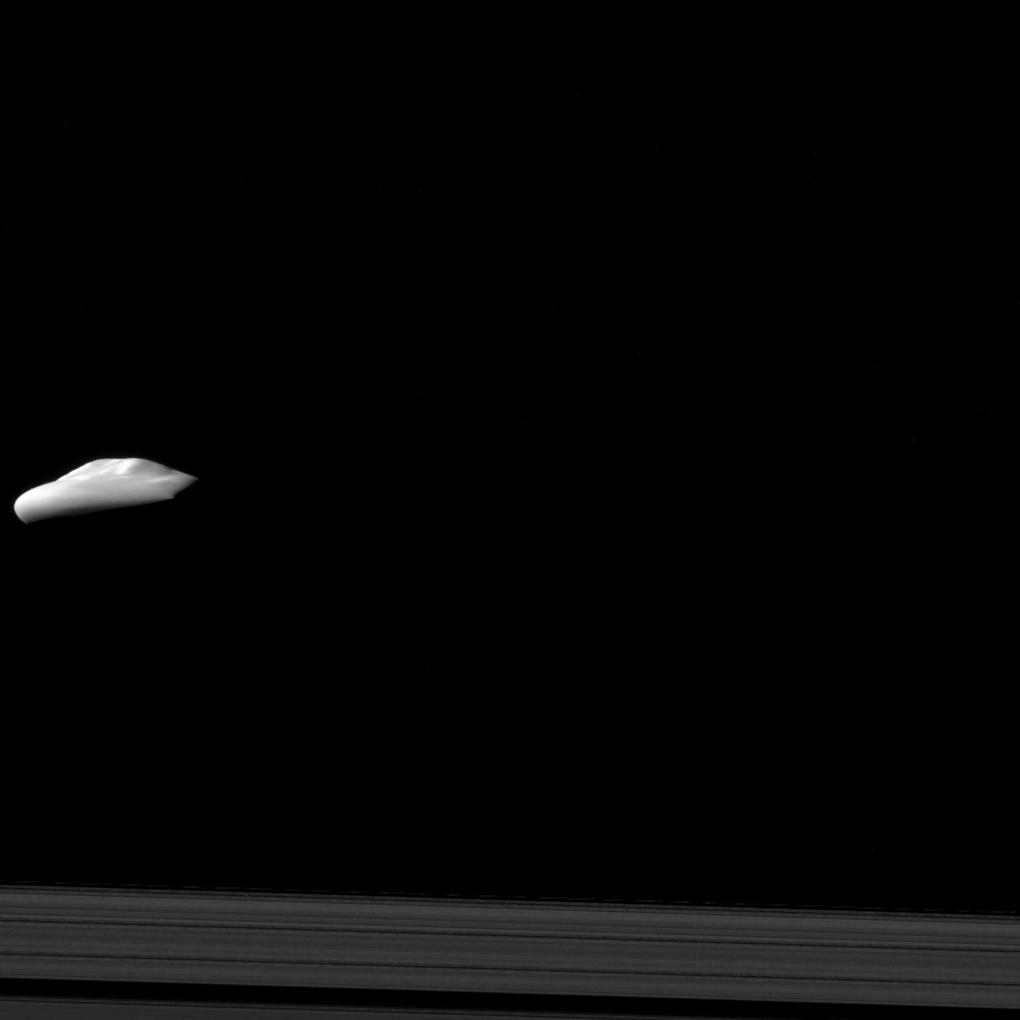
Atlas near the A ring
(December 6, 2015).

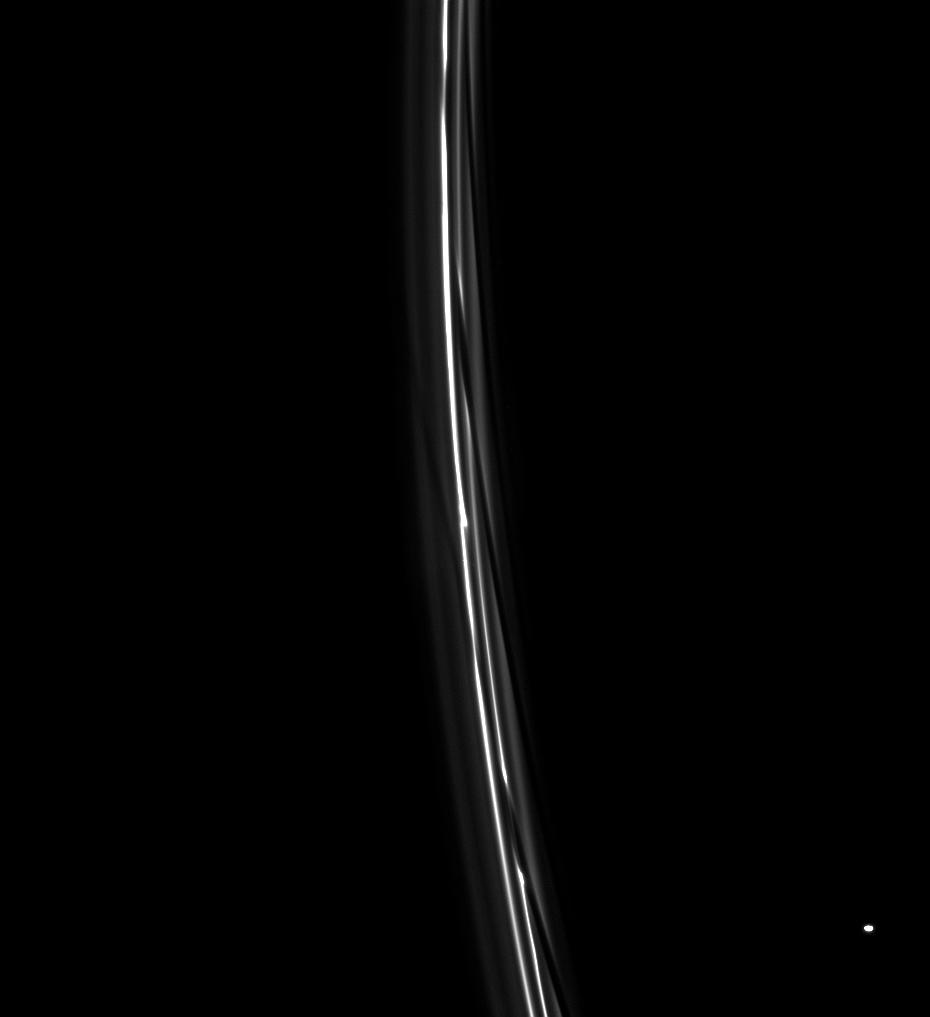
Atlas near the F ring
(May 9, 2005).
