= S/2020 S 4 =

Moon of Saturn

Discovery
- Discovered by: Edward Ashton, Brett J. Gladman
- Discovery date: 2020

Orbital characteristics
- Semi-major axis: 18,235,500 km (11,331,000 mi)
- Eccentricity: 0.495
- Orbital period (sidereal): 2.538 yrs (926.96 d)
- Inclination: 40.1° (to the ecliptic)
- Satellite of: Saturn
- Group: Gallic group

Physical characteristics
- Mean diameter: 3 km
- Absolute magnitude (H): 17.0

S/2020 S 4 is a small and very faint natural satellite of Saturn. It was discovered by Edward Ashton, Brett J. Gladman, Jean-Marc Petit and Mike Alexandersen on June 24, 2020, and was announced on May 6, 2023 by the IAU Minor Planet Center after observations were collected over a long period of time to confirm the satellite's orbit that were taken between July 1, 2019 and July 9, 2021.

== Orbit ==
S/2020 S 4 is a highly eccentric satellite with an eccentricity of 0.495, it orbits Saturn at an average distance of 18.2 million km and has an orbital period of 2 and a half years, with an inclination of 40.1° to the ecliptic, suggesting that it belongs to the Gallic group. However, sometimes its moon group is disputed, and it may be included in the Inuit group. It has been suggested that it was a fragment piece of Siarnaq that broke off a long time ago in a time-span of a few thousand years.

The orbit of S/2020 S 4 is librating in accordance of the von Zeipel–Lidov–Kozai effect.

== Physical characteristics ==
S/2020 S 4 is estimated to be 3 km in diameter and has an absolute magnitude of 17, making it one of the faintest moons of Saturn. Scott S. Sheppard and Tilmann Denk on the other hand, estimated it to be 2 km and 2.25 km, respectively. If these estimates were true, it would make S/2020 S 4 one of the smallest known irregular moons of Saturn.
