= Albiorix (Gaulish deity) =

Gaulish deity, often associated with Mars

Albiorix is a deity often associated with the god Mars.

== Name ==
The origin of the name Albiorix is based on connection with the deity Mars, and as such the cult of this deity was known in the Haute-Provence and in the Alps.

Scholars disagree with this being an individual deity or one that has been connected with Mars through syncretism and interpretatio.

The name of one of the moons of Saturn was named after this deity.

== Attestations ==
The inscription from the Corpus Inscriptionum Latinarum (CIL) includes references to the deity:

ALBIORICE

While also connected to the deity Mars found on fragments of vases:

MARTI

ALBIORIGI
