= Sidera Lodoicea =

Moons of Saturn

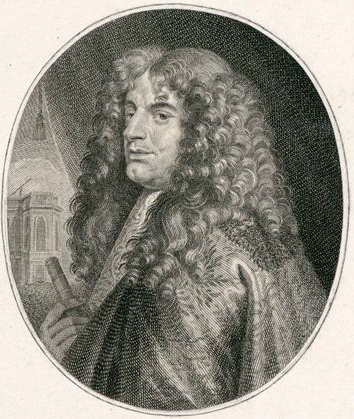
Cassini

Sidera Lodoicea /ˈsɪdərə ˌloʊdoʊˈɪsiːə/ is the name given by the astronomer Giovanni Domenico Cassini to the four moons of Saturn discovered by him in the years 1671, 1672, and 1684 and published in his Découverte de deux nouvelles planètes autour de Saturne in 1673 and in the Journal des sçavans in 1686. These satellites are today known by the following names, given in 1847:

- Iapetus or Saturn VIII, discovered October 25, 1671
- Rhea or Saturn V, discovered December 23, 1672
- Tethys or Saturn III, discovered March 21, 1684
- Dione or Saturn IV, discovered March 21, 1684

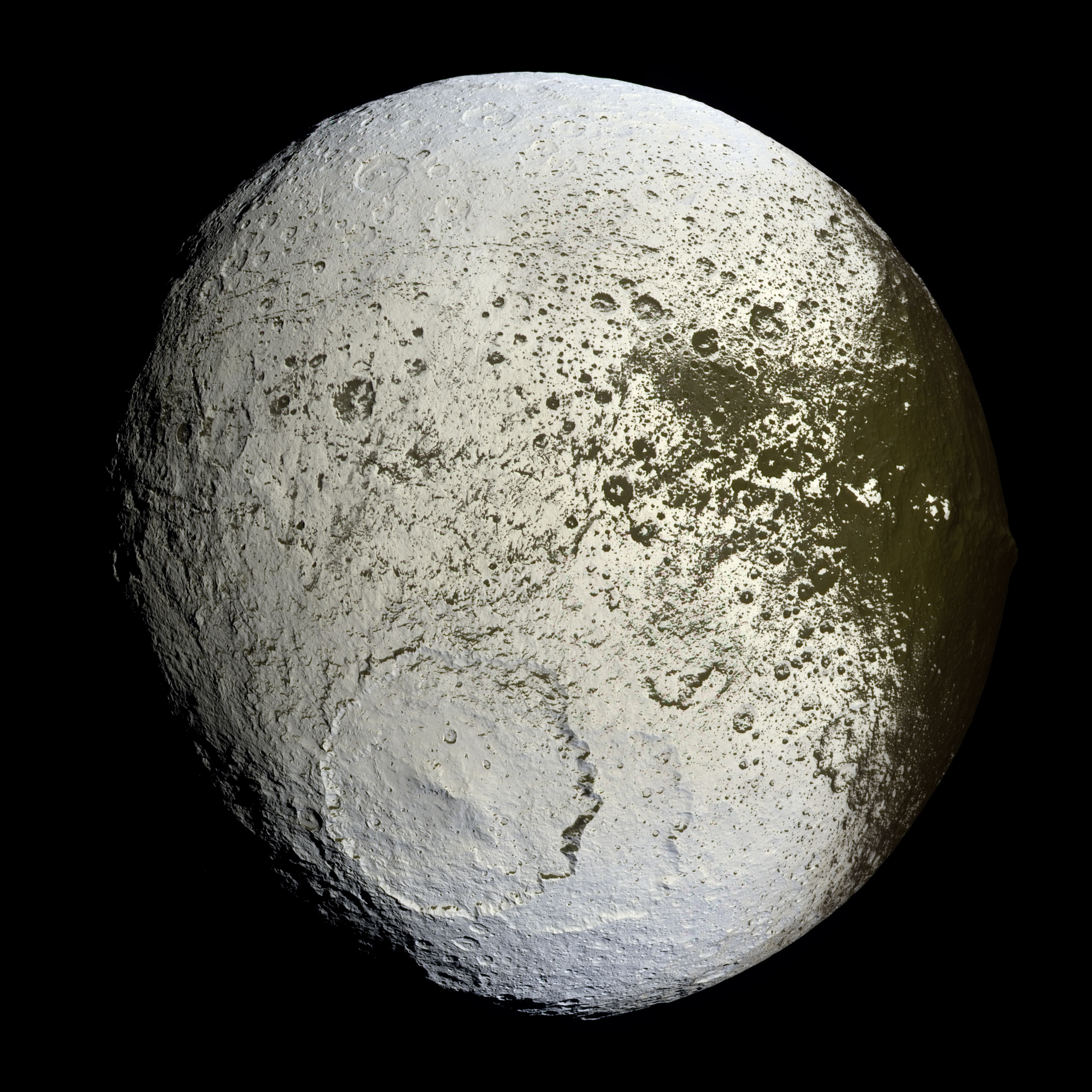
Iapetus

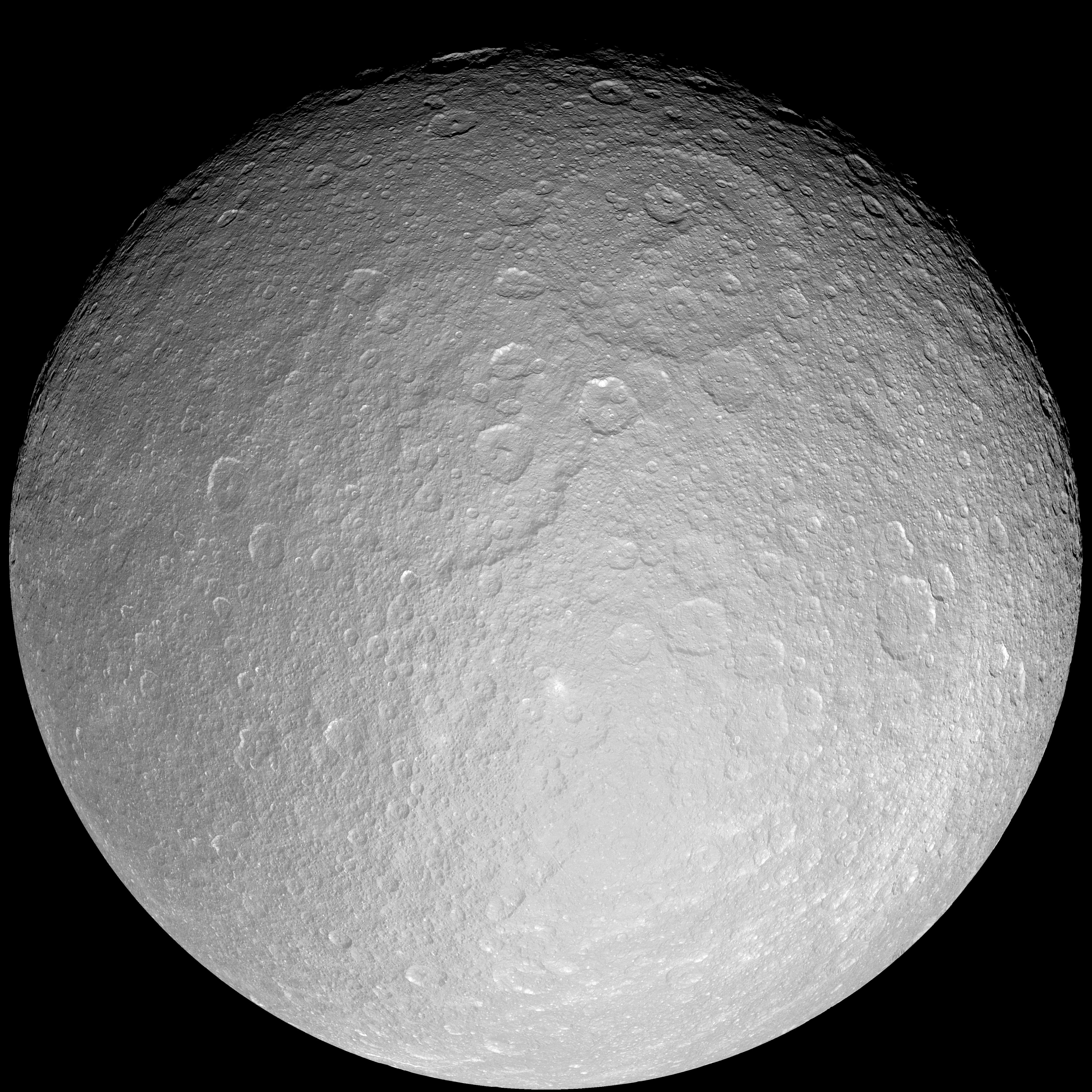
Rhea

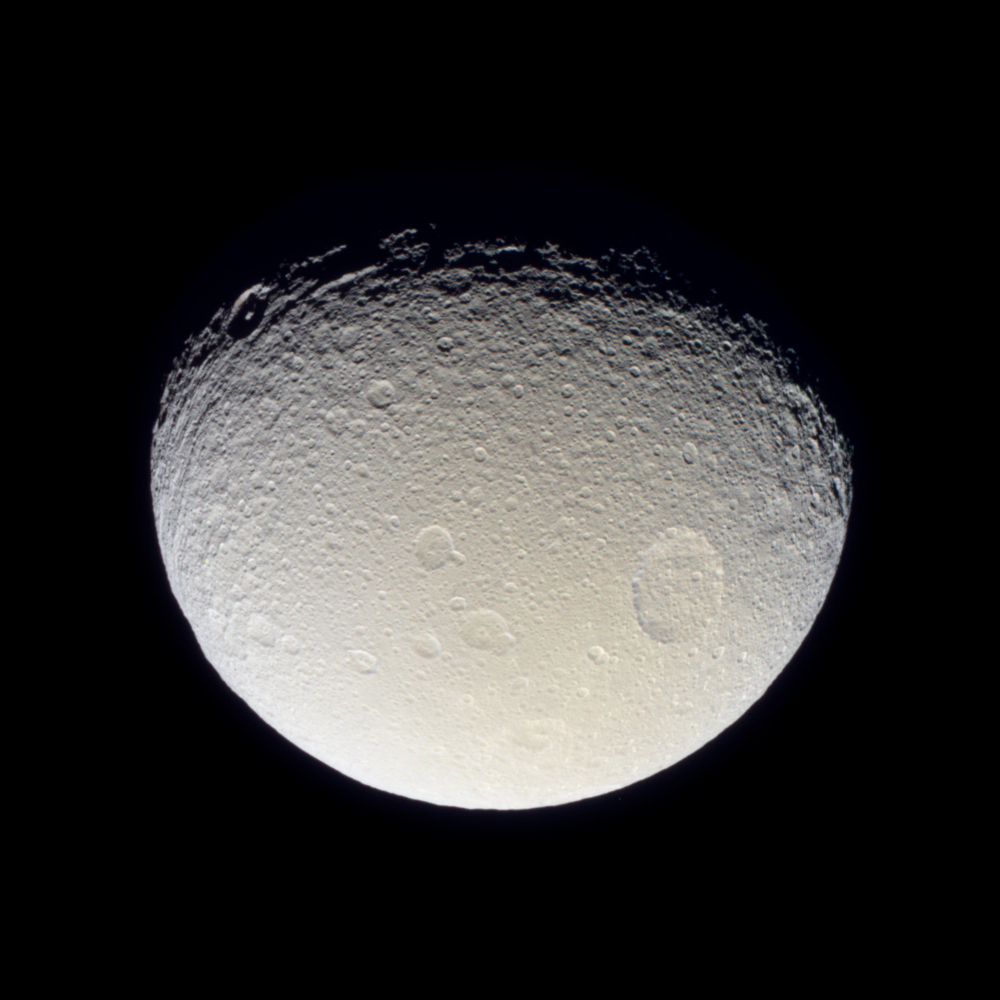
Tethys

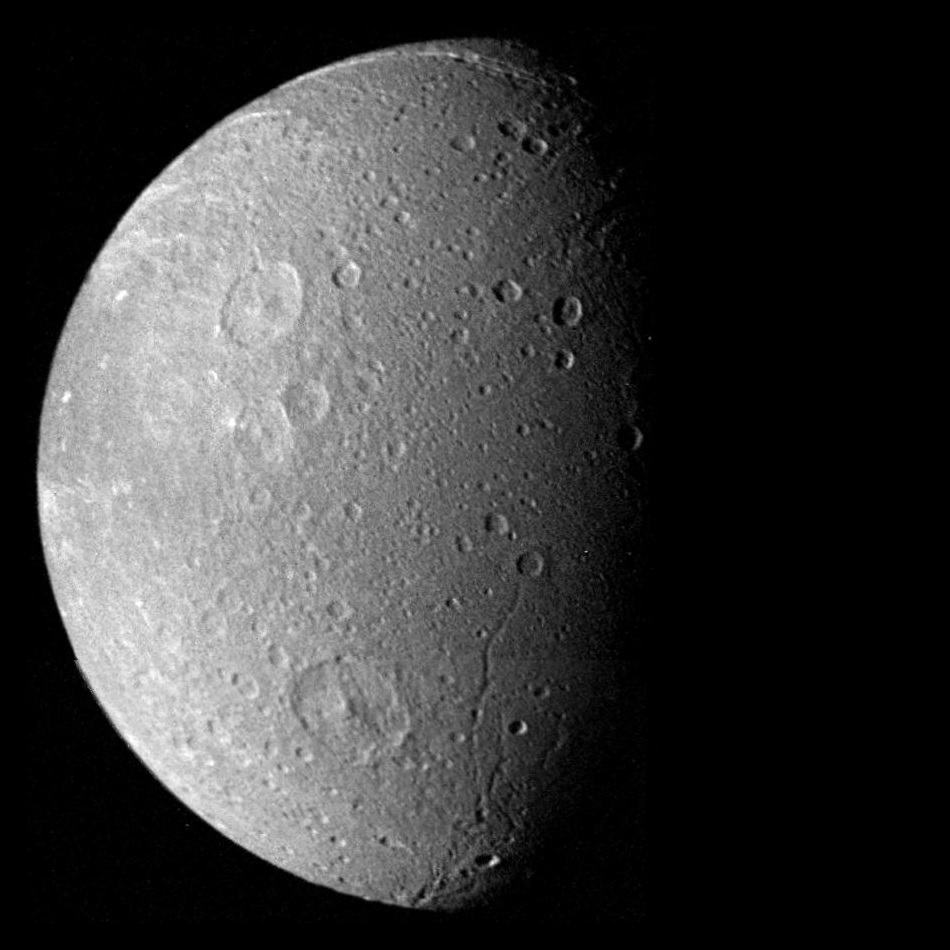
Dione

The name Sidera Lodoicea means "Louisian Stars", from Latin sidus "star" and Lodoiceus, a nonce adjective coined from Lodoicus, one of several Latin forms of the French name Louis (reflecting an older form, Lodhuwig). Cassini intended the name to honor King Louis XIV of France, who reigned from 1643 to 1715, and who was Cassini's benefactor as patron of the Paris Observatory, of which Cassini was the director.

The name was modelled on Sidera Medicea, "Medicean stars", the Latin name used by Galileo to name the four Galilean satellites of Jupiter, in honor of the Florentine house of Medici.

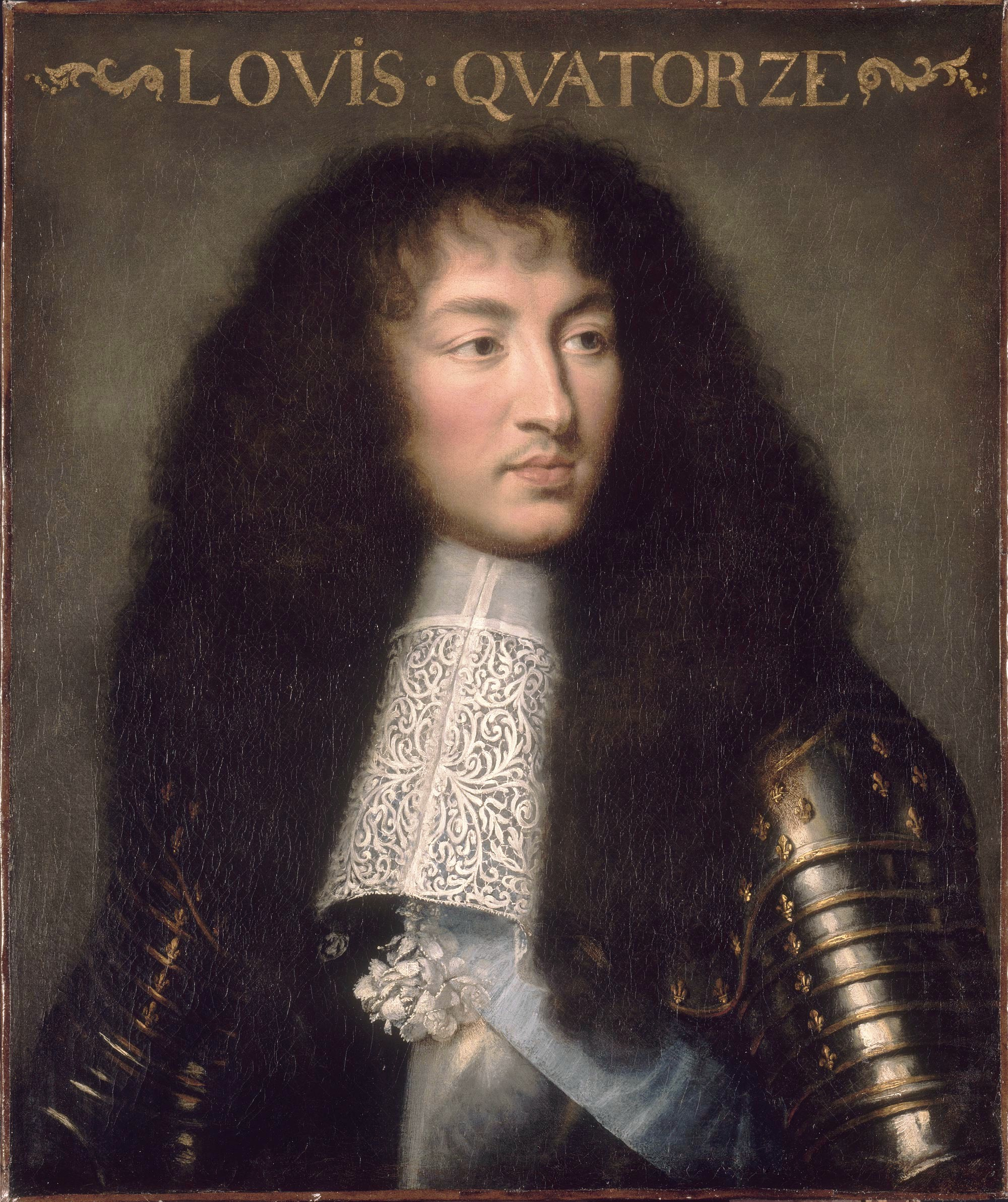
Louis XIV

The following contemporary (1686) notice records Cassini's choice of name, and explains his rationale for the same:

In the Conclusion, the Discoverer considers that the Antient Astronomers, having translated the Names of their Heroes among the Starrs, those Names have continued down to us unchanged, notwithstanding the endeavour of following Ages to alter them; and that Galileo, after their Example, had honoured the House of the Medici with the discovery of the Satellites of Jupiter, made by him under the Protection of Cosmus II; which Starrs will be always known by the Name of Sidera Medicea. Wherefore he concludes that the Satellites of Saturn, being much more exalted and more difficult to discover, are not unworthy to bear the Name of Louis le Grand, under whose Reign and in whose Observatory the same have been detected, which therefore he calls Sidera Lodoicea, not doubting but to have perpetuated the Name of that King, by a Monument much more lasting than those of Brass and Marble, which shall be erected to his Memory.
