= Saturn LX =

Moon of Saturn

Discovery
- Discovered by: Sheppard et al.
- Discovery date: 2019

Designations
- Alternative names: S/2004 S 29; S2428b

Orbital characteristics
- Semi-major axis: 17063900 km
- Eccentricity: 0.485
- Orbital period (sidereal): 837.78 days
- Inclination: 38.6°
- Satellite of: Saturn
- Group: Gallic group

Physical characteristics
- Mean diameter: 4 km
- Apparent magnitude: 24.9
- Absolute magnitude (H): 15.8

Saturn LX, provisionally known as S/2004 S 29, is a natural satellite of Saturn and a member of the Gallic group. Its discovery was announced by Scott S. Sheppard, David C. Jewitt, and Jan Kleyna on October 7, 2019 from observations taken between December 12, 2004 and January 17, 2007. It was given its permanent designation in August 2021.

Saturn LX is about 4 kilometres in diameter, and orbits Saturn at an average distance of 17 million km (11 million mi) in 837.78 d (2.2937 a), at an average inclination of 38.6° to the ecliptic, with an eccentricity of 0.485.

Saturn LX was initially thought to be part of the Inuit group before it was recategorized to the Gallic group in 2022.
