= S/2004 S 24 =

Moon of Saturn

Discovery
- Discovered by: Scott S. Sheppard; David C. Jewitt; Jan T. Kleyna
- Discovery date: 2019

Designations
- Alternative names: S8881b

Orbital characteristics
- Epoch 27 April 2019 (JD 2458600.5)
- Observation arc: 2.27 yr (830 d)
- Earliest precovery date: 12 December 2004
- Semi-major axis: 0.1530807 AU (22.90055 Gm)
- Eccentricity: 0.0846039
- Orbital period (sidereal): 3.545 yr (1,293.85 d)
- Mean anomaly: 169.90382°
- Mean motion: 0° 16^{m} 41.665^{s} / day
- Inclination: 35.53797° (to the ecliptic)
- Longitude of ascending node: 333.87854°
- Argument of perihelion: 48.98081°
- Satellite of: Saturn
- Group: Gallic group?

Physical characteristics
- Mean diameter: 3 km
- Albedo: 0.04 (assumed)
- Apparent magnitude: 25.2
- Absolute magnitude (H): 16.0

S/2004 S 24 is a natural satellite of Saturn, and the outermost known prograde satellite. Its discovery was announced by Scott S. Sheppard, David C. Jewitt, and Jan Kleyna on October 7, 2019 from observations taken between December 12, 2004 and March 22, 2007.

S/2004 S 24 is about 3 kilometres in diameter, and orbits Saturn at an average distance of 22.901 million km in 1294.25 days, at an inclination of 35.5° to the ecliptic, in a prograde direction and with an eccentricity of 0.085. Due to its inclination being similar to members of the Gallic group, S/2004 S 24 could belong to the Gallic group. However, its orbit is much more distant, which puts this classification into question. It could very well be in a group of its own.

268 irregular moons of Saturn plotted by semi-major axis and inclination as of April 2026. S/2004 S 24 (green) is shown as a distant outlier of the Gallic group.

Alternatively, S/2004 S 24 could have formed when Albiorix or another Gallic group member was hit in a head-on collision while at the farthest point of their orbit, resulting in its large orbital distance.

The exact formation mechanism of S/2004 S 24 is unknown, and due to its low eccentricity (0.085) a captured orbit is unlikely. Nonetheless, S/2004 S 24 orbits in the opposite direction of all other moons in its orbital region, making it unlikely to have survived in this orbit over the entire history of the Solar System.
