= Hal A. Weaver =

American astronomer (born 1956)

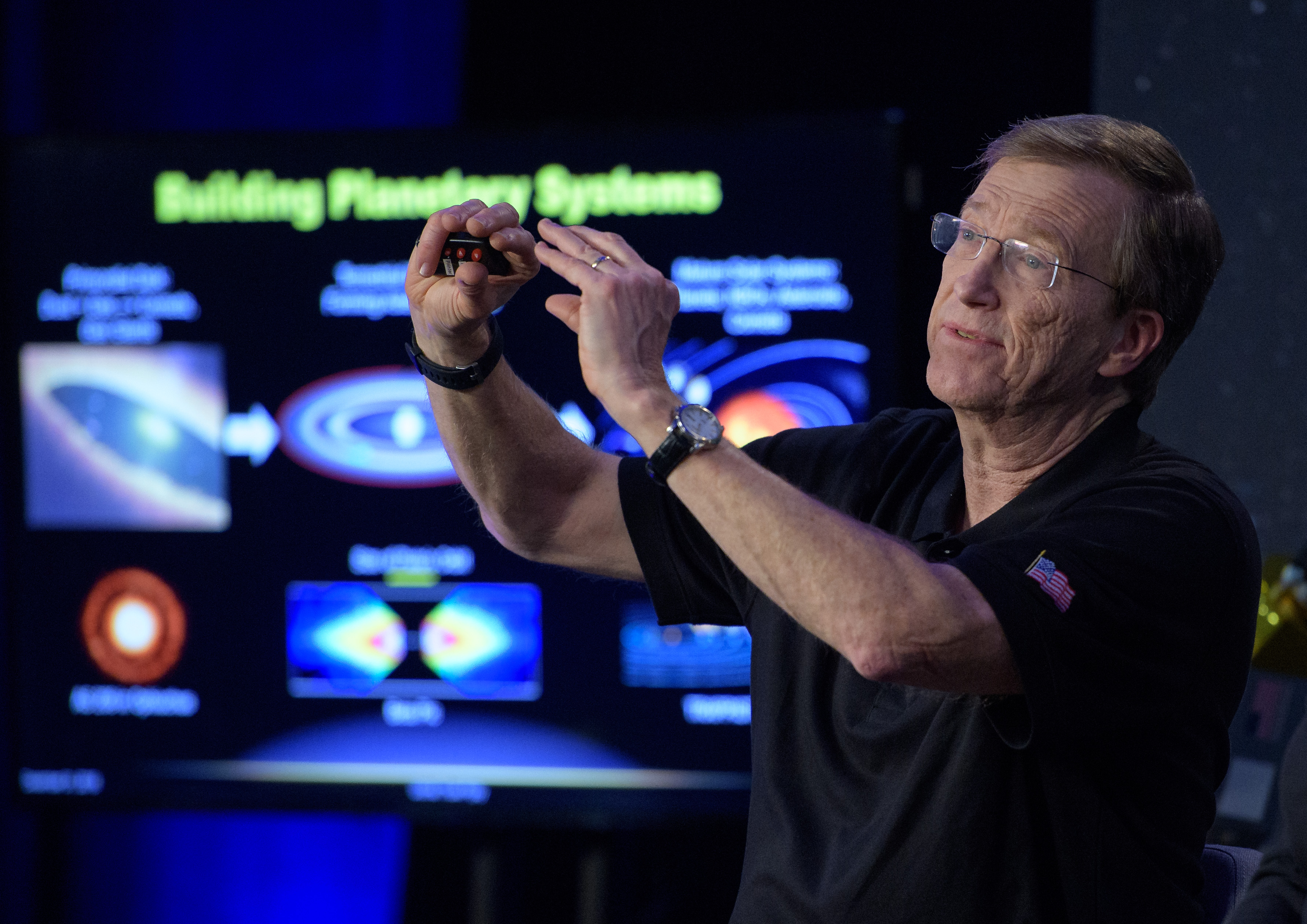
- Hal Weaver discusses 486958 Arrokoth
- Born: Harold Anthony Weaver; 1953 (age 72–73)
- Education: Duke University; Johns Hopkins University
- Scientific career
- Fields: Astronomy

Harold Anthony "Hal" Weaver, Jr. (born 1953) is an American astronomer, known for his research into the composition of solar system bodies including comets and Kuiper belt objects.

Weaver attended Duke University as an undergraduate, and obtained his PhD from Johns Hopkins, where he researched the spectra of comets using data from the International Ultraviolet Explorer space telescope.

Since 2002 Weaver has worked at the Applied Physics Laboratory. He is co-investigator on the Alice ultraviolet imaging spectrometer on board the Rosetta mission to comet 67P/Churyumov–Gerasimenko, In the 1990s and 2000s he worked on the Far Ultraviolet Spectroscopic Explorer space telescope, conducted research into comets using the Hubble Space Telescope, and co-led the Pluto Companion Search Team that in 2005 discovered the second and third moons of Pluto (Nix and Hydra) using the Hubble Space Telescope.

His involvement in the New Horizons mission to Pluto and beyond meant that Weaver was also co-discoverer of Kerberos and Styx in 2011 and 2012 respectively. Weaver has frequently appeared with New Horizons principal investigator Alan Stern at press briefings announcing the mission's findings following the fly-bys of Pluto and 486958 Arrokoth, and has made media appearances to discuss the mission.

The Mars-crossing asteroid 5720 Halweaver is named after him.
