= Stephen P. Synnott =

American astronomer (born 1946)

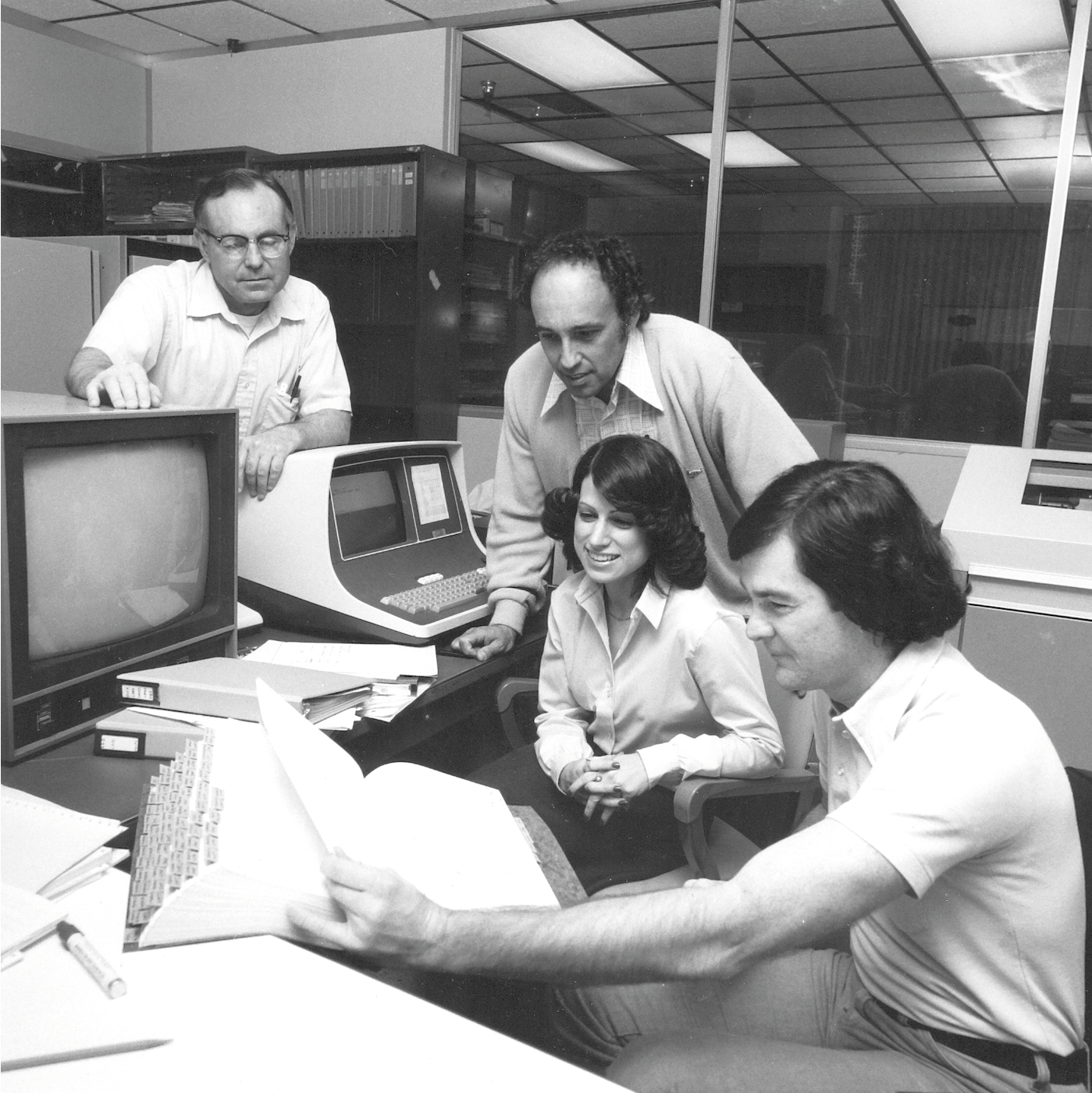
Joe Donegan, Ed Travers, Linda Morabito and Steve Synnott in the navigation team’s image processing room, where the discovery of active volcanism on Io took place.

Stephen P. Synnott (born 1946) is an American astronomer and Voyager scientist at JPL, and expert in spacecraft optical navigation techniques. He has discovered several natural satellites of outer Solar System planets such as Metis, Puck, Larissa (recovered), Cressida, Thebe and Proteus.

The minor planet 6154 Stevesynnott, discovered by Henry E. Holt in 1990, was named in his honour. The approved naming citation was published by the Minor Planet Center on 1 July 1996 (M.P.C. 27461).
