= Richard J. Terrile =

American astronomer

Richard John Terrile (born March 22, 1951, in New York) is a Voyager scientist who discovered several moons of Saturn, Uranus, and Neptune. He works for NASA's Jet Propulsion Laboratory.

In 1984, together with Bradford A. Smith, Terrile became the first to photograph a protoplanetary disc around Beta Pictoris using a coronagraph.

Terrile is a supporter of the simulation hypothesis, the idea that our reality is a computer-generated virtual reality created by unknown programmers.
