= Tarvos (moon) =

Moon of Saturn

- Animation of discovery images taken by the CFHT in September 2000

Discovery
- Discovered by: B. J. Gladman et al.
- Discovery date: September 23, 2000

Designations
- Designation: Saturn XXI
- Pronunciation: /ˈtɑːrvɒs/
- Named after: Tarvos Trigaranus
- Alternative names: S/2000 S 4
- Adjectives: Tarvian

Orbital characteristics
- Epoch 2000 January 1.5
- Semi-major axis: 18.2166 million km
- Eccentricity: 0.522
- Orbital period (sidereal): 917.98 d (2.51 yr)
- Inclination: 37.8°
- Satellite of: Saturn
- Group: Gallic group

Physical characteristics
- Mean diameter: 15+50% −30% km
- Synodic rotation period: 10.691±0.001 h
- Albedo: <0.15 <0.10 (likely); 0.06 (assumed)
- Spectral type: light red B−V=0.77, R−V=0.57
- Apparent magnitude: 22.1
- Absolute magnitude (H): 12.9

Tarvos, or Saturn XXI, is a prograde irregular satellite of Saturn. It was discovered by John J. Kavelaars et al. on September 23, 2000, and given the temporary designation S/2000 S 4. The name, given in August 2003, is after Tarvos, a deity depicted as a bull god carrying three cranes alongside its back from Gaulish mythology.

== Orbit ==
Discovery images of Tarvos (circled) taken by the CFHT

Tarvos orbits Saturn at an average distance of 18 million km in 918 days and is about 15 km in diameter (assuming an albedo of 0.06). It has a high orbital eccentricity of 0.52.

It is a member of the Gallic group of irregular satellites.

== Origin ==
With a similar orbit and displaying a similar light-red colour to Albiorix, Tarvos is thought to have its origin in the break-up of a common progenitor or to be a fragment of that body.
