= Albiorix (moon) =

Moon of Saturn

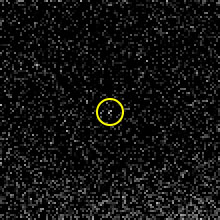
- Composite image of Albiorix from 2010 observations by the Wide-field Infrared Survey Explorer (WISE) spacecraft

Discovery
- Discovered by: M. J. Holman et al.
- Discovery date: 19 December 2000

Designations
- Designation: Saturn XXVI
- Pronunciation: /ˌælbiˈɒrɪks/
- Named after: Mars Albiorix
- Alternative names: S/2000 S 11
- Adjectives: Albiorigian /ˌælbiəˈrɪdʒiən/

Orbital characteristics
- Epoch 2000 January 1.5
- Semi-major axis: 16329100 km
- Eccentricity: 0.470
- Orbital period (sidereal): 783.5 d (2.15 yr)
- Inclination: 38.9°
- Satellite of: Saturn
- Group: Gallic group

Physical characteristics
- Mean diameter: 28.6±5.4 km
- Synodic rotation period: 13.33±0.03 h
- Albedo: 0.062±0.028
- Spectral type: D
- Apparent magnitude: 20.5
- Absolute magnitude (H): 11.35±0.05

Albiorix, /ˌælbiˈɒrɪks/ also known as Saturn XXVI, is the largest member of the Gallic group and Saturn's third-largest irregular moon.

== Discovery and Naming ==
Albiorix was discovered by Holman and colleagues in 2000, and given the temporary designation S/2000 S 11.

It was named in August 2003 for Albiorix, "a Gallic giant who was considered to be the king of the world." The name is known from an inscription found near the French town of Sablet which connects him with the Roman god Mars. It is still unclear if Albiorix was just an honorific suffix (lit. "Mars, king of the world") or a Celtic deity interpretatio with Mars.

== Orbit ==
The diagram illustrates the orbit from albiorix in relation to other prograde irregular satellites of Saturn. The eccentricity of the orbits is represented by the yellow segments extending from the pericentre to the apocentre.

Albiorix orbits Saturn at an average distance of 16 million kilometers in 783.5 days, at an inclination of about 39° to the ecliptic, in a prograde direction. eccentricity amounts to of 0.470. Its orbit is continuously changing due to solar and planetary perturbations.

Albiorix belongs to the Gallic group, a prograde group of moons orbiting between 16 and 23 Gm from Saturn at an inclinations between 34 and 41°, and eccentricities between 0.07 and 0.56.

== Physical characteristics ==
Albiorix observed by WISE in 2010

Measurements from NEOWISE constrain the albedo of Albiorix at 0.062±0.028, in which case its diameter is a rather large 28.6±5.4 km.

Albiorix is red in color (B−V=0.89, R−V=0.50, but some parts of its surface are less red than others. Varying colours suggest a possibility of a large crater, leading to an alternative hypothesis that Erriapus and Tarvos could be fragments of Albiorix following a near-break-up collision with another body.

The James Webb Space Telescope took the spectrum of Albiorix with NIRSpec, detecting a 3.0 micron absorption feature associated with hydrated minerals, though water ice was not found to be present in substantial quantities. Additionally, carbon dioxide formed by irradiation of organic compounds was detected on Albiorix's surface. Albiorix appears nearly identical in its composition to Siarnaq, another Saturnian irregular satellite observed by James Webb Space Telescope.

The rotation period was measured by the ISS camera of the Cassini spacecraft to 13 hours and 7,8 minutes.

The Albiorix lightcurves show a large brightness variation, indicative of a rather elongated shape of this moon. While one light curve measured by Cassini–Huygens found two minima with a moderate perturbation in one of them, a different angle showed a sharp minimum and two shallower ones.

== Origin ==
Albiorix probably did not form near Saturn but was captured by Saturn later. Like the other members of the Gallic group, which have similar orbits, Albiorix is probably the remnant of a broken, captured heliocentric asteroid.

== Exploration ==
Albiorix was observed by the Cassini spacecraft between 2005 and 2017, during which time its light curve was measured and its rotation period determined.
