= Timeline of discovery of Solar System planets and their moons =

Thе history of discovering planets and moons

The timeline of discovery of Solar System planets and their natural satellites charts the progress of the discovery of new bodies over history. Each object is listed in chronological order of its discovery (multiple dates occur when the moments of imaging, observation, and publication differ), identified through its various designations (including temporary and permanent schemes), and the discoverer(s) listed.

Historically the naming of moons did not always match the times of their discovery. Traditionally, the discoverer enjoys the privilege of naming the new object; however, some neglected to do so (E. E. Barnard stated he would "defer any suggestions as to a name" [for Amalthea] "until a later paper" but never got around to picking one from the numerous suggestions he received) or actively declined (S. B. Nicholson stated "Many have asked what the new satellites [Lysithea and Carme] are to be named. They will be known only by the numbers X and XI, written in Roman numerals, and usually prefixed by the letter J to identify them with Jupiter."). The issue arose nearly as soon as planetary satellites were discovered: Galileo referred to the four main satellites of Jupiter using numbers while the names suggested by his rival Simon Marius gradually gained universal acceptance. The International Astronomical Union (IAU) eventually started officially approving names in the late 1970s. With the explosion of discoveries in the 21st century, new moons have once again started to be left unnamed even after their numbering, beginning with Jupiter LI and Jupiter LII in 2010.

== Key info ==
In the following tables, planetary satellites are indicated in bold type (e.g. Moon) while planets and dwarf planets, which directly circle the Sun, are in italic type (e.g. Earth). The Sun itself is indicated in roman type. The tables are sorted by publication/announcement date. Dates are annotated with the following symbols:

- i: for date of the discovery observation. This is not always the date of first imaging (photography, etc.) – see precovery;
- o: for date of first human visual observation, either through telescope or on photographic plate;
- p: for date of announcement or publication.

In a few cases, the date is uncertain and is then marked "(?)".

* Note: Moons marked by an asterisk (*) had complicated discoveries, such as being lost and rediscovered. Some of them thus appear multiple times in the list to clarify the situation.

Color legend

The Sun, the planets, dwarf planets, and their natural satellites are marked in the following colors:

Sun

The Sun

Planets

Mercury
Venus
Earth and satellite
Mars and satellites
Jupiter and satellites
Saturn and satellites
Uranus and satellites
Neptune and satellites

Consensus dwarf planets

Ceres
Orcus and satellite
Pluto and satellites
Haumea and satellites
Quaoar and satellite
Makemake and satellite
Gonggong and satellite
Eris and satellite
Sedna

Other dwarf planet candidates

Achlys and satellite
Ixion
Ritona
Máni
Goibniu
Salacia and satellite
Varuna
Uni and satellite
Varda and satellite
Aya
Chiminigagua and satellite

It is not known precisely how many objects in the Solar System are dwarf planets. The nine objects listed in the third column are the ones agreed on by most astronomers, corresponding to a threshold of about 900–1000 km diameter. There may be more; some of the largest objects beyond that threshold are included in the fourth column as candidates. In particular, Salacia and Varda each have a rather large moon, and current estimates for their densities still leave open the possibility that they are dwarf planets.

Designations

- Other designations are synonyms or periphrases sometimes encountered for the object.
- Permanent designations (of planetary satellites) are explained here.
- Temporary designations are explained here.

If a satellite is named, its name is bolded; if it is unnamed, but has a permanent designation, then its permanent designation is bolded; and if it has neither, then its temporary designation is bolded.

== Prehistorically discovered ==
Prehistory
Name	Image	Other designation	Notes
Sun		Star	In the geocentric model, developed in Ancient Greece, then standardized by Ptolemy in the 2nd century, the Earth was believed to be at the center of the cosmos. Seven planets were placed in orbit around it in an order of increasing distance from the Earth, as established by the Greek Stoics: the Moon, Mercury, Venus, the Sun, Mars, Jupiter, and Saturn. This list included two objects, the Sun and the Moon, which are now not generally considered planets. In the 5th century BCE, the Greek philosophers Philolaus and Hicetas speculated separately that the Earth was a sphere revolving daily around some mystical "central fire" that regulated the universe. Anaxagoras proposed that the Sun is a star around 450 BCE. In the 3rd century BCE, Aristarchus of Samos extended this idea by proposing that the Earth and other planets moved around a definite central object, which he believed to be the Sun, although this was not widely accepted until the 17th century and not proven until the 19th.
Earth		3rd Planet	Earth is the third planet from the Sun and the subject of historical misconception for centuries. Earth was never formally 'discovered' because it was never an unrecognized entity by humans. However, its shared identity with other bodies as a "planet" is a historically recent discovery. The Earth's position in the Solar System was correctly described in the heliocentric model proposed by Aristarchus of Samos, but not widely recognized until the Copernican Revolution.
Moon		Earth I	Prior to the Copernican Revolution, the moon was considered one of the seven classical planets, and its geologic features were one of the discoveries that convinced astronomers that the earth was in fact a planet like the moon. In the Copernican system, the Moon was considered a secondary planet (ie, natural satellite of the Earth), and was originally thought to be the only body in that system whose revolution was not centered on the Sun.
Mercury		1st Planet	Mercury, Venus, Mars, Jupiter and Saturn were identified by ancient Babylonian astronomers in the 2nd millennium BCE. They were correctly identified as orbiting the Sun by Aristarchus of Samos, and later in Nicolaus Copernicus' heliocentric system (De revolutionibus orbium coelestium, 1543)
Venus		2nd Planet	Mercury, Venus, Mars, Jupiter and Saturn were identified by ancient Babylonian astronomers in the 2nd millennium BCE. They were correctly identified as orbiting the Sun by Aristarchus of Samos, and later in Nicolaus Copernicus' heliocentric system (De revolutionibus orbium coelestium, 1543)
Mars		4th Planet	Mercury, Venus, Mars, Jupiter and Saturn were identified by ancient Babylonian astronomers in the 2nd millennium BCE. They were correctly identified as orbiting the Sun by Aristarchus of Samos, and later in Nicolaus Copernicus' heliocentric system (De revolutionibus orbium coelestium, 1543)
Jupiter		5th Planet	Mercury, Venus, Mars, Jupiter and Saturn were identified by ancient Babylonian astronomers in the 2nd millennium BCE. They were correctly identified as orbiting the Sun by Aristarchus of Samos, and later in Nicolaus Copernicus' heliocentric system (De revolutionibus orbium coelestium, 1543)
Saturn		6th Planet	Mercury, Venus, Mars, Jupiter and Saturn were identified by ancient Babylonian astronomers in the 2nd millennium BCE. They were correctly identified as orbiting the Sun by Aristarchus of Samos, and later in Nicolaus Copernicus' heliocentric system (De revolutionibus orbium coelestium, 1543)

== 17th century ==
17th century
Date	Name	Image	Permanent designation	Discoverer(s) and notes
1610s
o: 7 January 1610 p: 13 March 1610	Ganymede		Jupiter III	Galileo discovered the Galilean moons of Jupiter. These satellites were the first celestial objects that were confirmed to orbit an object other than the Sun or Earth. Galileo saw Io and Europa as a single point of light on 7 January 1610; they were seen as separate bodies the following night.
o: 7 January 1610 p: 13 March 1610	Callisto		Jupiter IV	Galileo discovered the Galilean moons of Jupiter. These satellites were the first celestial objects that were confirmed to orbit an object other than the Sun or Earth. Galileo saw Io and Europa as a single point of light on 7 January 1610; they were seen as separate bodies the following night.
o: 8 January 1610 p: 13 March 1610	Io		Jupiter I	Galileo discovered the Galilean moons of Jupiter. These satellites were the first celestial objects that were confirmed to orbit an object other than the Sun or Earth. Galileo saw Io and Europa as a single point of light on 7 January 1610; they were seen as separate bodies the following night.
o: 8 January 1610 p: 13 March 1610	Europa		Jupiter II	Galileo discovered the Galilean moons of Jupiter. These satellites were the first celestial objects that were confirmed to orbit an object other than the Sun or Earth. Galileo saw Io and Europa as a single point of light on 7 January 1610; they were seen as separate bodies the following night.
1650s
o: 25 March 1655 p: 5 March 1656	Titan		Saturn VI; Saturn II (1673–1684), Saturn IV (1686–1789)	Huygens first "published" his discovery as an anagram, sent out on 13 June 1655; later published in pamphlet form as De Saturni luna Observatio Nova and in full in Systema Saturnium (July 1659).
1670s
o: 25 October 1671 p: 1673	Iapetus		Saturn VIII; Saturn III (1673–1684), Saturn V (1686–1789), Saturn VII (1789–1848)	Cassini
o: 23 December 1672 p: 1673	Rhea		Saturn V Saturn I (1673–1684), Saturn III (1686–1789)	Cassini
1680s
o: 21 March 1684 p: 22 April 1686	Tethys		Saturn III; Saturn I (1686–1789)	Cassini Together with his previous two discoveries, Cassini named these satellites Sidera Lodoicea. In his work Kosmotheôros (published posthumously in 1698), Christiaan Huygens relates "Jupiter you see has his four, and Saturn his five Moons about him, all plac’d in their Orbits."
o: 21 March 1684 p: 22 April 1686	Dione		Saturn IV; Saturn II (1686–1789)	Cassini Together with his previous two discoveries, Cassini named these satellites Sidera Lodoicea. In his work Kosmotheôros (published posthumously in 1698), Christiaan Huygens relates "Jupiter you see has his four, and Saturn his five Moons about him, all plac’d in their Orbits."
Date	Name	Image	Permanent designation	Discoverer(s) and notes

The numbering of Saturn's moons was adjusted with each new discovery until 1848, in order to continue reflecting their order from their parent planet.

== 18th century ==
18th century
Date	Name	Image	Other/Permanent designation	Discoverer(s) and notes
1780s
o: 13 March 1781 p: 26 April 1781	Uranus		7th Planet	Herschel first reported the discovery of Uranus on 26 April 1781, initially believing it to be a comet.
o: 11 January 1787 p: 15 February 1787	Titania		Uranus III; Uranus I (1787–1797)	Herschel. He later reported four more spurious satellites.
o: 11 January 1787 p: 15 February 1787	Oberon		Uranus IV; Uranus II (1787–1797)	Herschel. He later reported four more spurious satellites.
o: 28 August 1789 p: 12 November 1789	Enceladus		Saturn II	Herschel
o: 17 September 1789 p: 12 November 1789	Mimas		Saturn I	Herschel
Date	Name	Image	Other/Permanent designation	Discoverer(s) and notes

The numbering of Titania and Oberon underwent some confusion, because in 1797, Herschel reported four more satellites of Uranus that turned out not to exist. Before any more Uranian moons were discovered, William Lassell sometimes adopted Herschel's numbers where Titania and Oberon are respectively Uranus II and IV, and sometimes called them respectively Uranus I and II. After he discovered Ariel and Umbriel in 1851, Lassell numbered the four real Uranian satellites then known outward from their parent planet as I (Ariel), II (Umbriel), III (Titania), and IV (Oberon), and this finally stuck.

== 19th century ==
19th century
Date	Name	Image	Other/Permanent designation	Discoverer(s) and notes
1800s
o: 1 January 1801 p: 24 January 1801	Ceres		8th Planet (1801); Asteroid (1851); Dwarf planet (2006)	Giuseppe Piazzi. He first announced his discovery on 24 January 1801, in letters to fellow astronomers. The first formal publication was the September 1801 issue of the Monatliche Correspondenz.
1840s
o: 23 September 1846 p: 13 November 1846	Neptune		13th Planet (1846) (Note: At the time of Neptune's discovery, dwarf planet Ceres and asteroids Pallas, Juno, Vesta, and Astraea were counted as planets.); 8th Planet (1851)	Galle and Le Verrier
o: 10 October 1846 p: 13 November 1846	Triton		Neptune I	Lassell
o: 16 September 1848 p: 7 October 1848	Hyperion		Saturn VII	Bond, Bond, Lassell
1850s
o: 24 October 1851	Ariel		Uranus I	Lassell
o: 24 October 1851	Umbriel		Uranus II	Lassell
1870s
o: 12 August 1877	Deimos		Mars II	Hall
o: 18 August 1877	Phobos		Mars I	Hall
1890s
o: 9 September 1892 p: 4 October 1892	Amalthea		Jupiter V	Barnard
i: 16 August 1898 o: 17 March 1899	Phoebe		Saturn IX	Pickering
Date	Name	Image	Other/Permanent designation	Discoverer(s) and notes

The discovery of Amalthea marks the first time the Roman numerals were not adjusted with the discovery of a new satellite; from then on they reflected order of discovery rather than distance from the parent planet.

== 20th century ==
=== 1901–1950 ===
Early 20th century
Date	Name	Image	Permanent designation	Discoverer(s) and notes
1900s
i: 3 December 1904 p: 6 January 1905	Himalia		Jupiter VI	Perrine
i: 2 January 1905 p: 27 February 1905	Elara		Jupiter VII	Perrine
i: 27 January 1908 o: 28 February 1908 p: 1–6 March 1908	Pasiphae		Jupiter VIII	Melotte
1910s
i: 21 July 1914 p: 17 September 1914	Sinope		Jupiter IX	Nicholson
1930s
i: 23 January 1930 o: 18 February 1930 p: 13 March 1930	Pluto		9th Planet (1930); Dwarf planet (2006)	Tombaugh
i: 6 July 1938 p: August 1938	Lysithea		Jupiter X	Nicholson
i: 30 July 1938 p: August 1938	Carme		Jupiter XI	Nicholson
1940s
i: 16 February 1948 p: June 1949	Miranda		Uranus V	Kuiper
i: 1 May 1949 p: August 1949	Nereid		Neptune II	Kuiper
Date	Name	Image	Permanent designation	Discoverer(s) and notes

=== 1951–2000 ===
Late 20th century
Date	Name	Temporary Designation	Image	Permanent Designation	Discoverer(s) and notes
1950s
i: 28 September 1951 p: December 1951	Ananke	—		Jupiter XII	Nicholson
1960s
i: 15 December 1966 p: 3 January 1967	Janus*	S/1966 S 2		Saturn X	Dollfus (Dollfus may have seen either Janus or Epimetheus)
i: 18 December 1966 p: 6 January 1967	Epimetheus*	S/1980 S 3		Saturn XI	Walker
1970s
i: 11 September 1974 p: 20 September 1974	Leda	—		Jupiter XIII	Kowal
i: 30 September 1975 p: 3 October 1975	Themisto*	S/1975 J 1		Jupiter XVIII	Kowal and Roemer (Discovered and then lost)
i: 13 April 1978 o: 22 June 1978 p: 7 July 1978	Charon	S/1978 P 1		Pluto I	Christy
i: 8 July 1979 p: 23 November 1979	Adrastea	S/1979 J 1		Jupiter XV	Jewitt, Danielson, Voyager 2
1980s
Date	Name	Temporary designation	Image	Permanent designation	Discoverer(s) and notes
i: 26 February 1980 p: 6 March 1980	Epimetheus*	S/1980 S 3		Saturn XI	(Confirmed by Voyager 1)
i: 1 March 1980 p: 6 March 1980	Helene	S/1980 S 6		Saturn XII	Laques, Lecacheux
i: 8 April 1980 p: 10 April 1980	Telesto	S/1980 S 13		Saturn XIII	Smith, Reitsema, Larson, Fountain, Voyager 1
i: 5 March 1979 p: 28 April 1980	Thebe	S/1979 J 2		Jupiter XIV	Synnott, Voyager 1
i: 19 February 1980 p: 6 June 1980	Janus*	S/1980 S 1		Saturn X	(Confirmed by Voyager 1)
i: 13 March 1980 p: 31 July 1980	Calypso	S/1980 S 25		Saturn XIV	Pascu, Seidelmann, Baum, Currie
i: 4 March 1979 p: 26 August 1980	Metis	S/1979 J 3		Jupiter XVI	Synnott, Voyager 1
o: October 1980 p: 31 October 1980	Prometheus	S/1980 S 27		Saturn XVI	Collins, Voyager 1
o: October 1980 p: 31 October 1980	Pandora	S/1980 S 26		Saturn XVII	Collins, Voyager 1
o: October 1980 p: 13 November 1980	Atlas	S/1980 S 28		Saturn XV	Terrile, Voyager 1
i: 24 May 1981 p: 29 May 1981	Larissa*	S/1981 N 1		Neptune VII	Reitsema, Hubbard, Lebofsky, Tholen
i: 30 December 1985 p: 9 January 1986	Puck	S/1985 U 1		Uranus XV	Synnott, Voyager 2
i: 3 January 1986 p: 16 January 1986	Juliet	S/1986 U 2		Uranus XI	Synnott, Voyager 2
i: 3 January 1986 p: 16 January 1986	Portia	S/1986 U 1		Uranus XII	Synnott, Voyager 2
i: 9 January 1986 p: 16 January 1986	Cressida	S/1986 U 3		Uranus IX	Synnott, Voyager 2
i: 13 January 1986 p: 16 January 1986	Desdemona	S/1986 U 6		Uranus X	Synnott, Voyager 2
i: 13 January 1986 p: 16 January 1986	Rosalind	S/1986 U 4		Uranus XIII	Synnott, Voyager 2
i: 13 January 1986 p: 16 January 1986	Belinda	S/1986 U 5		Uranus XIV	Synnott, Voyager 2
i: 20 January 1986 p: 27January 1986	Cordelia	S/1986 U 7		Uranus VI	Terrile, Voyager 2
i: 20 January 1986 p: 27January 1986	Ophelia	S/1986 U 8		Uranus VII	Terrile, Voyager 2
i: 23 January 1986 p: 27 January 1986	Bianca	S/1986 U 9		Uranus VIII	Smith, Voyager 2
i: 16 June 1989 p: 7 July 1989	Proteus	S/1989 N 1		Neptune VIII	Synnott, Voyager 2
i: 28 July 1989 p: 2 August 1989	Larissa*	S/1989 N 2		Neptune VII	Synnott, Voyager 2 (recovered)
i: 28 July 1989 p: 2 August 1989	Despina	S/1989 N 3		Neptune V	Synnott, Voyager 2
i: 28 July 1989 p: 2 August 1989	Galatea	S/1989 N 4		Neptune VI	Synnott, Voyager 2
i: 18 September 1989 p: 29 September 1989	Thalassa	S/1989 N 5		Neptune IV	Terrile, Voyager 2
i: 18 September 1989 p: 29 September 1989	Naiad	S/1989 N 6		Neptune III	Terrile, Voyager 2
1990s
Date	Name	Temporary designation	Image	Permanent designation	Discoverer(s) and notes
i: 22 August 1981 p: 16 July 1990	Pan*	S/1981 S 13		Saturn XVIII	Showalter, Voyager 2
i: 23 August 1981 p: 14 April 1995	Pallene* (see below)	S/1981 S 14		Saturn XXXIII	Gordon, Murray and Beurle
i: 6 September 1997 p: 31 October 1997	Caliban	S/1997 U 1		Uranus XVI	Gladman, Nicholson, Burns, Kavelaars
i: 6 September 1997 p: 31 October 1997	Sycorax	S/1997 U 2		Uranus XVII	Gladman, Nicholson, Burns, Kavelaars
i: 18 January 1986 p: 18 May 1999	Perdita*	S/1986 U 10		Uranus XXV	Karkoschka, Voyager 2
i: 18 July 1999 p: 27 July 1999	Setebos	S/1999 U 1		Uranus XIX	Kavelaars, Gladman, Holman, Petit, Scholl
i: 18 July 1999 p: 27 July 1999	Stephano	S/1999 U 2		Uranus XX	Gladman, Holman, Kavelaars, Petit, Scholl
i: 18 July 1999 p: 4 September 1999	Prospero	S/1999 U 3		Uranus XVIII	Holman, Kavelaars, Gladman, Petit, Scholl
2000s
Date	Name	Temporary designation	Image	Permanent designation	Discoverer(s) and notes
i: 6 October 1999 p: 20 July 2000	Callirrhoe	S/1999 J 1		Jupiter XVII	Scotti, Spahr, McMillan, Larsen, Montani, Gleason, Gehrels
i: 7 August 2000 p: 25 October 2000	Ymir	S/2000 S 1		Saturn XIX	Gladman
i: 7 August 2000 p: 25 October 2000	Paaliaq	S/2000 S 2		Saturn XX	Gladman
i: 23 September 2000 p: 25 October 2000	Siarnaq	S/2000 S 3		Saturn XXIX	Gladman, Kavelaars
i: 23 September 2000 p: 25 October 2000	Tarvos	S/2000 S 4		Saturn XXI	Kavelaars, Gladman
i: 7 August 2000 p: 18 November 2000	Kiviuq	S/2000 S 5		Saturn XXIV	Gladman
i: 23 September 2000 p: 18 November 2000	Ijiraq	S/2000 S 6		Saturn XXII	Kavelaars, Gladman
i: 21 November 2000 p: 25 November 2000	Themisto*	S/2000 J 1		Jupiter XVIII	Sheppard, Jewitt, Fernández, Magnier (Rediscovered)
i: 28 November 2000 p: 1 December 2000	Varuna	(20000) 2000 WR_{106}		Dwarf planet candidate?	McMillan
i: 23 September 2000 p: 7 December 2000	Thrymr	S/2000 S 7		Saturn XXX	Gladman, Kavelaars
i: 23 September 2000 p: 7 December 2000	Skathi	S/2000 S 8		Saturn XXVII	Kavelaars, Gladman
i: 23 September 2000 p: 7 December 2000	Mundilfari	S/2000 S 9		Saturn XXV	Gladman, Kavelaars
i: 23 September 2000 p: 7 December 2000	Erriapus	S/2000 S 10		Saturn XXVIII	Kavelaars, Gladman
i: 9 November 2000 p: 19 December 2000	Albiorix	S/2000 S 11		Saturn XXVI	Holman, Spahr
i: 23 September 2000 p: 22 December 2000	Suttungr	S/2000 S 12		Saturn XXIII	Gladman, Kavelaars
Date	Name	Temporary designation	Image	Permanent designation	Discoverer(s) and notes

== 21st century ==
=== 2000s ===
2000s
Date	Name	Temporary designation	Image	Permanent designation	Discoverer(s) and notes
i: 23 November 2000 p: 5 January 2001	Kalyke	S/2000 J 2		Jupiter XXIII	Sheppard, Jewitt, Fernández, Magnier, Dahm, Evans
i: 23 November 2000 p: 5 January 2001	Iocaste	S/2000 J 3		Jupiter XXIV	Sheppard, Jewitt, Fernández, Magnier, Dahm, Evans
i: 23 November 2000 p: 5 January 2001	Erinome	S/2000 J 4		Jupiter XXV	Sheppard, Jewitt, Fernández, Magnier, Dahm, Evans
i: 23 November 2000 p: 5 January 2001	Harpalyke	S/2000 J 5		Jupiter XXII	Sheppard, Jewitt, Fernández, Magnier, Dahm, Evans
i: 23 November 2000 p: 5 January 2001	Isonoe	S/2000 J 6		Jupiter XXVI	Sheppard, Jewitt, Fernández, Magnier, Dahm, Evans
i: 23 November 2000 p: 5 January 2001	Praxidike	S/2000 J 7		Jupiter XXVII	Sheppard, Jewitt, Fernández, Magnier, Dahm, Evans
i: 25 November 2000 p: 5 January 2001	Megaclite	S/2000 J 8		Jupiter XIX	Sheppard, Jewitt, Fernández, Magnier, Dahm, Evans
i: 25 November 2000 p: 5 January 2001	Taygete	S/2000 J 9		Jupiter XX	Sheppard, Jewitt, Fernández, Magnier, Dahm, Evans
i: 26 November 2000 p: 5 January 2001	Chaldene	S/2000 J 10		Jupiter XXI	Sheppard, Jewitt, Fernández, Magnier, Dahm, Evans
i: 5 December 2000 p: 5 January 2001	Dia	S/2000 J 11		Jupiter LIII	Sheppard, Jewitt, Fernández, Magnier, Dahm, Evans
i: 22 May 2001 p: 1 July 2001	Ixion	(28978) 2001 KX_{76}		Dwarf planet candidate?	Elliot, Wasserman, Buie, Millis, Kern, Qu, Pate
Date	Name	Temporary designation	Image	Permanent designation	Discoverer(s) and notes
i: 9 December 2001 p: 16 May 2002	Hermippe	S/2001 J 3		Jupiter XXX	Sheppard, Jewitt, Kleyna
i: 9 December 2001 p: 16 May 2002	Eurydome	S/2001 J 4		Jupiter XXXII	Sheppard, Jewitt, Kleyna
i: 9 December 2001 p: 16 May 2002	Sponde	S/2001 J 5		Jupiter XXXVI	Sheppard, Jewitt, Kleyna
i: 9 December 2001 p: 16 May 2002	Kale	S/2001 J 8		Jupiter XXXVII	Sheppard, Jewitt, Kleyna
i: 10 December 2001 p: 16 May 2002	Autonoe	S/2001 J 1		Jupiter XXVIII	Sheppard, Jewitt, Kleyna
i: 11 December 2001 p: 16 May 2002	Thyone	S/2001 J 2		Jupiter XXIX	Sheppard, Jewitt, Kleyna
i: 11 December 2001 p: 16 May 2002	Pasithee	S/2001 J 6		Jupiter XXXVIII	Sheppard, Jewitt, Kleyna
i: 11 December 2001 p: 16 May 2002	Euanthe	S/2001 J 7		Jupiter XXXIII	Sheppard, Jewitt, Kleyna
i: 11 December 2001 p: 16 May 2002	Orthosie	S/2001 J 9		Jupiter XXXV	Sheppard, Jewitt, Kleyna
i: 11 December 2001 p: 16 May 2002	Euporie	S/2001 J 10		Jupiter XXXIV	Sheppard, Jewitt, Kleyna
i: 11 December 2001 p: 16 May 2002	Aitne	S/2001 J 11		Jupiter XXXI	Sheppard, Jewitt, Kleyna
i: 10 January 2002 p: 20 July 2002	Aya	(55565) 2002 AW_{197}		Dwarf planet candidate?	Brown, Trujillo, Helin, Hicks, Lawrence, Pravdo
i: 13 August 2001 p: 30 September 2002	Trinculo	S/2001 U 1		Uranus XXI	Holman, Kavelaars, Milisavljevic
i: 4 June 2002 o: 5 June 2002 p: 7 October 2002	Quaoar	(50000) 2002 LM_{60}		Dwarf planet	Trujillo, Brown
i: 30 October 2002 p: 1 November 2002	Uni	(55637) 2002 UX_{25}		Dwarf planet candidate?	Spacewatch
i: 18 June 2002 p: 21 November 2002	Máni	(307261) 2002 MS_{4}		Dwarf planet candidate?	Trujillo, Brown
i: 31 October 2002 p: 18 December 2002	Arche	S/2002 J 1		Jupiter XLIII	Sheppard, Meech, Hsieh, Tholen, Tonry
Date	Name	Temporary designation	Image	Permanent designation	Discoverer(s) and notes
i: 23 July 2002 p: 13 January 2003	Sao	S/2002 N 2		Neptune XI	Holman, Kavelaars, Grav, Fraser, Milisavljevic
i: 10 August 2002 p: 13 January 2003	Halimede	S/2002 N 1		Neptune IX	Holman, Kavelaars, Grav, Fraser, Milisavljevic
i: 11 August 2002 p: 13 January 2003	Laomedeia	S/2002 N 3		Neptune XII	Holman, Kavelaars, Grav, Fraser, Milisavljevic
i: 13 January 2003 p: 26 January 2003	Achlys	(208996) 2003 AZ_{84}		Dwarf planet candidate?	Trujillo, Brown
i: 5 February 2003 p: 4 March 2003	Eukelade	S/2003 J 1		Jupiter XLVII	Sheppard, Jewitt, Kleyna, Fernández, Hsieh
i: 5 February 2003 p: 4 March 2003	(unnamed moon of Jupiter)	S/2003 J 2		Jupiter LXXIII	Sheppard, Jewitt, Kleyna, Fernández, Hsieh
i: 5 February 2003 p: 4 March 2003	Eupheme	S/2003 J 3		Jupiter LX	Sheppard, Jewitt, Kleyna, Fernández, Hsieh
i: 5 February 2003 p: 4 March 2003	(unnamed moon of Jupiter)	S/2003 J 4		—	Sheppard, Jewitt, Kleyna, Fernández, Hsieh
i: 6 February 2003 p: 4 March 2003	Eirene	S/2003 J 5	—	Jupiter LVII	Sheppard, Jewitt, Kleyna, Fernández, Hsieh
i: 6 February 2003 p: 4 March 2003	Helike	S/2003 J 6		Jupiter XLV	Sheppard, Jewitt, Kleyna, Fernández, Hsieh
i: 8 February 2003 p: 4 March 2003	Aoede	S/2003 J 7	—	Jupiter XLI	Sheppard, Jewitt, Kleyna, Fernández, Hsieh
i: 8 February 2003 p: 6 March 2003	Hegemone	S/2003 J 8	—	Jupiter XXXIX	Sheppard, Jewitt, Kleyna, Fernández
i: 6 February 2003 p: 7 March 2003	(unnamed moons of Jupiter)	S/2003 J 9		—	Sheppard, Jewitt, Kleyna, Fernández
i: 6 February 2003 p: 7 March 2003	(unnamed moons of Jupiter)	S/2003 J 10		—	Sheppard, Jewitt, Kleyna, Fernández
i: 6 February 2003 p: 7 March 2003	Kallichore	S/2003 J 11	—	Jupiter XLIV	Sheppard, Jewitt, Kleyna, Fernández
i: 8 February 2003 p: 7 March 2003	(unnamed moon of Jupiter)	S/2003 J 12		—	Sheppard, Jewitt, Kleyna, Fernández
i: 9 February 2003 p: 2 April 2003	Cyllene	S/2003 J 13	—	Jupiter XLVIII	Sheppard, Jewitt, Kleyna
i: 8 February 2003 p: 3 April 2003	Kore	S/2003 J 14		Jupiter XLIX	Sheppard, Jewitt, Kleyna
i: 6 February 2003 p: 3 April 2003	Philophrosyne	S/2003 J 15	—	Jupiter LVIII	Sheppard, Jewitt, Kleyna, Fernández
i: 6 February 2003 p: 3 April 2003	(unnamed moon of Jupiter)	S/2003 J 16		—	Gladman, Sheppard, Jewitt, Kleyna, Kavelaars, Petit, Allen
i: 8 February 2003 p: 3 April 2003	Herse	S/2003 J 17	—	Jupiter L	Gladman, Sheppard, Jewitt, Kleyna, Kavelaars, Petit, Allen
i: 6 February 2003 p: 4 April 2003	(unnamed moon of Jupiter)	S/2003 J 18		Jupiter LV	Gladman, Kavelaars, Petit, Allen, Sheppard, Jewitt, Kleyna
i: 5 February 2003 p: 8 April 2003	Narvi	S/2003 S 1		Saturn XXXI	Sheppard, Jewitt, Kleyna
i: 6 February 2003 p: 12 April 2003	(unnamed moon of Jupiter)	S/2003 J 19	—	Jupiter LXI	Gladman, Sheppard, Jewitt, Kleyna, Kavelaars, Petit, Allen
i: 9 February 2003 p: 14 April 2003	Carpo	S/2003 J 20		Jupiter XLVI	Sheppard, Gladman, Kavelaars, Petit, Allen, Jewitt, Kleyna
i: 6 February 2003 p: 29 May 2003	Mneme	S/2003 J 21		Jupiter XL	Sheppard, Jewitt, Kleyna, Gladman, Kavelaars, Petit, Allen
i: 18 January 1986 p: 3 September 2003	Perdita*	S/1986 U 10		Uranus XXV	Karkoschka (Recovered by the Hubble Space Telescope)
i: 29 August 2003 p: 3 September 2003	Psamathe	S/2003 N 1		Neptune X	Jewitt, Kleyna, Sheppard, Holman, Kavelaars
i: 25 August 2003 p: 25 September 2003	Mab	S/2003 U 1		Uranus XXVI	Showalter, Lissauer
i: 25 August 2003 p: 25 September 2003	Cupid	S/2003 U 2		Uranus XXVII	Showalter, Lissauer
i: 13 August 2001 p: 30 September 2003	Ferdinand*	S/2001 U 2		Uranus XXIV	2001: Holman, Kavelaars, Milisavljevic; 2003: Sheppard, Jewitt (recovered)
i: 14 August 2002 p: 30 September 2003	Neso	S/2002 N 4		Neptune XIII	Holman, Kavelaars, Grav, Fraser, Milisavljevic
i: 13 August 2001 p: 7 October 2003	Francisco	S/2001 U 3		Uranus XXII	Holman, Kavelaars, Milisavljevic, Gladman
i: 29 August 2003 p: 9 October 2003	Margaret	S/2003 U 3		Uranus XXIII	Sheppard, Jewitt, Holman, Kavelaars
Date	Name	Temporary designation	Image	Permanent designation	Discoverer(s) and notes
i: 9 February 2003 p: 24 January 2004	Thelxinoe	S/2003 J 22	—	Jupiter XLII	Sheppard, Jewitt, Kleyna, Gladman, Kavelaars, Petit, Allen
i: 6 February 2003 p: 31 January 2004	(unnamed moon of Jupiter)	S/2003 J 23		—	Sheppard, Jewitt, Kleyna, Fernández
i: 17 February 2004 p: 22 February 2004	Orcus	(90482) 2004 DW		Dwarf planet	Brown, Trujillo, Rabinowitz
i: 14 November 2003 p: 15 March 2004	Sedna	(90377) 2003 VB_{12}		Dwarf planet	Brown, Trujillo, Rabinowitz
i: 13 April 2004 p: 14 April 2004	Goibniu	(90568) 2004 GV_{9}		Dwarf planet candidate?	NEAT
i: 1 June 2004 p: 16 August 2004	Methone	S/2004 S 1		Saturn XXXII	Cassini–Huygens
i: 1 June 2004 p: 16 August 2004	Pallene*	S/2004 S 2		Saturn XXXIII	Cassini–Huygens
i: 14 August 2002 p: 19 August 2004	(unnamed moon of Neptune)	S/2002 N 5*		—	Holman, Kavelaars, Grav, Fraser (as lost moon c02N4)
i: 21 October 2004 o: 24 October 2004 p: 8 November 2004	Polydeuces	S/2004 S 5		Saturn XXXIV	Cassini–Huygens
Date	Name	Temporary designation	Image	Permanent designation	Discoverer(s) and notes
i: 12 December 2004 p: 3 May 2005	(unnamed moon of Saturn)	S/2004 S 7	—	Saturn LXVII	Sheppard, Jewitt, Kleyna, Marsden
i: 12 December 2004 p: 3 May 2005	Fornjot	S/2004 S 8		Saturn XLII	Sheppard, Jewitt, Kleyna, Marsden
i: 12 December 2004 p: 3 May 2005	Farbauti	S/2004 S 9	—	Saturn XL	Sheppard, Jewitt, Kleyna, Marsden
i: 12 December 2004 p: 3 May 2005	Aegir	S/2004 S 10	—	Saturn XXXVI	Sheppard, Jewitt, Kleyna, Marsden
i: 12 December 2004 p: 3 May 2005	Bebhionn	S/2004 S 11		Saturn XXXVII	Sheppard, Jewitt, Kleyna, Marsden
i: 12 December 2004 p: 3 May 2005	(unnamed moons of Saturn)	S/2004 S 12	—	—	Sheppard, Jewitt, Kleyna, Marsden
i: 12 December 2004 p: 3 May 2005	(unnamed moons of Saturn)	S/2004 S 13	—	—	Sheppard, Jewitt, Kleyna, Marsden
i: 12 December 2004 p: 3 May 2005	Hati	S/2004 S 14		Saturn XLIII	Sheppard, Jewitt, Kleyna, Marsden
i: 12 December 2004 p: 3 May 2005	Bergelmir	S/2004 S 15		Saturn XXXVIII	Sheppard, Jewitt, Kleyna, Marsden
i: 13 December 2004 p: 3 May 2005	Fenrir	S/2004 S 16	—	Saturn XLI	Sheppard, Jewitt, Kleyna, Marsden
i: 13 December 2004 p: 3 May 2005	(unnamed moon of Saturn)	S/2004 S 17	—	—	Sheppard, Jewitt, Kleyna, Marsden
i: 13 December 2004 p: 3 May 2005	Bestla	S/2004 S 18		Saturn XXXIX	Sheppard, Jewitt, Kleyna, Marsden
i: 22 September 2004 p: 6 May 2005	Salacia	(120347) 2004 SB_{60}		Dwarf planet candidate?	Roe, Brown, Barkume
i: 1 May 2005 p: 6 May 2005	Daphnis	S/2005 S 1		Saturn XXXV	Cassini–Huygens
i: 7 March 2003 o: 27 July 2005 i: 6 May 2004 o: 28 December 2004 p: 29 July 2005	Haumea	(136108) 2003 EL_{61}		Dwarf planet	(Ortiz, Aceituno Castro, Santos-Sanz) or (Brown, Trujillo, Rabinowitz) (see the Controversy over the discovery of Haumea)
i: 21 October 2003 o: 5 January 2005 p: 29 July 2005	Eris	(136199) 2003 UB_{313}		Dwarf planet	Brown, Trujillo, Rabinowitz
o: 26 January 2005 p: 29 July 2005	Hiʻiaka	S/2005 (2003 EL_{61}) 1		Haumea I	Brown, Keck Observatory adaptive optics team
i: 31 March 2005 p: 29 July 2005	Makemake	(136472) 2005 FY_{9}		Dwarf planet	Brown, Trujillo, Rabinowitz
i: 10 September 2005 p: 3 October 2005	Dysnomia	S/2005 (2003 UB_{313}) 1		Eris I	Brown, van Dam, Bouchez, Le Mignant, Campbell, Chin, Conrad, Hartman, Johansson, Lafon, Rabinowitz, Stomski, Summers, Trujillo, Wizinowich
i: 15 May 2005 o: 15 June 2005 p: 31 October 2005	Nix	S/2005 P 2		Pluto II	Weaver, Stern, Mutchler, Steffl, Buie, Merline, Spencer, Young, Young
i: 15 May 2005 o: 15 June 2005 p: 31 October 2005	Hydra	S/2005 P 1		Pluto III	Weaver, Stern, Mutchler, Steffl, Buie, Merline, Spencer, Young, Young
i: 1 March 2005 p: 1 December 2005	Namaka	S/2005 (2003 EL_{61}) 2		Haumea II	Brown, Keck Observatory adaptive optics team
Date	Name	Temporary designation	Image	Permanent designation	Discoverer(s) and notes
i: 21 June 2003 p: 7 January 2006	Varda	(174567) 2003 MW_{12}		Dwarf planet candidate?	Larsen
i: 12 December 2004 o: 6 March 2006 (?) p: 26 June 2006	Hyrrokkin	S/2004 S 19		Saturn XLIV	Sheppard, Jewitt, Kleyna
i: 4 January 2006 o: 6 March 2006 (?) p: 26 June 2006	(unnamed moon of Saturn)	S/2006 S 1	—	—	Sheppard, Jewitt, Kleyna
i: 4 January 2006 o: 6 March 2006 (?) p: 26 June 2006	Kari	S/2006 S 2		Saturn XLV	Sheppard, Jewitt, Kleyna
i: 5 January 2006 o: 6 March 2006 (?) p: 26 June 2006	(unnamed moon of Saturn)	S/2006 S 3	—	—	Sheppard, Jewitt, Kleyna
i: 5 January 2006 o: 6 March 2006 (?) p: 26 June 2006	Greip	S/2006 S 4		Saturn LI	Sheppard, Jewitt, Kleyna
i: 5 January 2006 o: 6 March 2006 (?) p: 26 June 2006	Loge	S/2006 S 5		Saturn XLVI	Sheppard, Jewitt, Kleyna
i: 5 January 2006 o: 6 March 2006 (?) p: 26 June 2006	Jarnsaxa	S/2006 S 6	—	Saturn L	Sheppard, Jewitt, Kleyna
i: 5 January 2006 o: 6 March 2006 (?) p: 26 June 2006	Surtur	S/2006 S 7	—	Saturn XLVIII	Sheppard, Jewitt, Kleyna
i: 5 January 2006 o: 6 March 2006 (?) p: 26 June 2006	Skoll	S/2006 S 8		Saturn XLVII	Sheppard, Jewitt, Kleyna
i: 10 September 2005 p: 23 July 2006	Ritona	(145452) 2005 RN_{43}		Dwarf planet candidate?	Becker, Puckett, Kubica
i: 21 July 2006 p: 19 September 2006	Actaea	—		Salacia I	Noll, Levison, Stephens, Grundy
i: 26 August 2005 p: 22 February 2007	Tinia	—		Uni I	Brown, Suer
i: 13 November 2005 p: 22 February 2007	Vanth	—		Orcus I	Brown, Suer
i: 2 December 2005 p: 22 February 2007	(unnamed moon of Achlys)	—		—	Brown, Suer
i: 14 February 2006 p: 22 February 2007	Weywot	—		Quaoar I	Brown, Suer
i: 5 January 2006 o: 16 January 2007 (?) p: 13 April 2007	Tarqeq	S/2007 S 1		Saturn LII	Sheppard, Jewitt, Kleyna
i: 18 January 2007 o: ? p: 1 May 2007	(unnamed moons of Saturn)	S/2007 S 2	—	—	Sheppard, Jewitt, Kleyna
i: 18 January 2007 o: ? p: 1 May 2007	(unnamed moons of Saturn)	S/2007 S 3	—	—	Sheppard, Jewitt, Kleyna
i: June 2004 o: 30 May 2007 p: 18 July 2007	Anthe	S/2007 S 4		Saturn XLIX	Cassini–Huygens
i: 17 July 2007 p: 7 January 2009	Gonggong	(225088) 2007 OR_{10}		Dwarf planet	Schwamb, Brown, Rabinowitz
i: 15 August 2008 p: 3 March 2009	Aegaeon	S/2008 S 1		Saturn LIII	Cassini–Huygens
i: 26 July 2009 o: ? p: 2 November 2009	(unnamed moon of Saturn)	S/2009 S 1		—	Cassini–Huygens
Date	Name	Temporary designation	Image	Permanent designation	Discoverer(s) and notes

=== 2010s ===
2010s
Date	Name	Temporary designation	Image	Permanent designation	Discoverer(s) and notes
i: 7 September 2010 p: 1 June 2011	(unnamed moons of Jupiter)	S/2010 J 1		Jupiter LI	Jacobson, Brozović, Gladman and Alexandersen
i: 7 September 2010 p: 1 June 2011	(unnamed moons of Jupiter)	S/2010 J 2		Jupiter LII	Veillet
i: 28 June 2011 p: 20 July 2011	Kerberos	S/2011 (134340) 1		Pluto IV	Showalter
i: 26 April 2009 p: September 2011	Ilmarë	—		Varda I	Noll et al.
i: 27 September 2011 p: 29 January 2012	(unnamed moons of Jupiter)	S/2011 J 1	—	Jupiter LXXII	Sheppard
i: 27 September 2011 p: 29 January 2012	(unnamed moons of Jupiter)	S/2011 J 2	—	Jupiter LVI	Sheppard
i: 26 June 2012 p: 11 July 2012	Styx	S/2012 (134340) 1		Pluto V	Showalter
i: 6 November 2004 o: 1 July 2013 p: 15 July 2013	Hippocamp*	S/2004 N 1		Neptune XIV	Showalter et al.
i: 17 March 2013 p: 31 March 2014	Chiminigagua	(532037) 2013 FY_{27}		Dwarf planet candidate?	Sheppard, Trujillo
i: 27 April 2015 p: 25 April 2016	(unnamed moon of Makemake)	S/2015 (136472) 1		—	Parker et al.
i: 9 November 2009 p: 17 October 2016	Xiangliu	—		Gonggong I	Marton, Kiss, Müller
i: 8 March 2016 p: 2 June 2017	(unnamed moons of Jupiter)	S/2016 J 1		Jupiter LIV	Sheppard et al.
i: 23 March 2017 p: 5 June 2017	(unnamed moons of Jupiter)	S/2017 J 1		Jupiter LIX	Sheppard et al.
i: 9 March 2016 p: 17 July 2018	Valetudo	S/2016 J 2		Jupiter LXII	Sheppard et al.
i: 5 February 2016 o: 23 March 2017 p: 17 July 2018	(unnamed moons of Jupiter)	S/2017 J 2		Jupiter LXIII	Sheppard et al.
i: 5 February 2016 o: 23 March 2017 p: 17 July 2018	(unnamed moons of Jupiter)	S/2017 J 3		Jupiter LXIV	Sheppard et al.
i: 23 March 2017 p: 17 July 2018	Pandia	S/2017 J 4		Jupiter LXV	Sheppard et al.
i: 23 March 2017 p: 17 July 2018	(unnamed moons of Jupiter)	S/2017 J 5		Jupiter LXVI	Sheppard et al.
i: 24 February 2017 o: 23 March 2017 p: 17 July 2018	(unnamed moons of Jupiter)	S/2017 J 6		Jupiter LXVII	Sheppard et al.
i: 24 February 2017 o: 23 March 2017 p: 17 July 2018	(unnamed moons of Jupiter)	S/2017 J 7		Jupiter LXVIII	Sheppard et al.
i: 23 March 2017 p: 17 July 2018	(unnamed moons of Jupiter)	S/2017 J 8		Jupiter LXIX	Sheppard et al.
i: 24 February 2017 o: 23 March 2017 p: 17 July 2018	(unnamed moons of Jupiter)	S/2017 J 9		Jupiter LXX	Sheppard et al.
i: 25 March 2017 o: 11 May 2018 p: 17 July 2018	Ersa	S/2018 J 1		Jupiter LXXI	Sheppard et al.
i: 15 January 2018 p: 10 August 2018	(unnamed moon of Chiminigagua)	—		—	Sheppard
i: 12 December 2004 p: 7 October 2019	Gridr	S/2004 S 20	—	Saturn LIV	Sheppard, Jewitt, Kleyna
i: 12 December 2004 p: 7 October 2019	(unnamed moon of Saturn)	S/2004 S 21	—	—	Sheppard, Jewitt, Kleyna
i: 12 December 2004 p: 7 October 2019	Angrboda	S/2004 S 22	—	Saturn LV	Sheppard, Jewitt, Kleyna
i: 12 December 2004 p: 7 October 2019	Skrymir	S/2004 S 23	—	Saturn LVI	Sheppard, Jewitt, Kleyna
i: 12 December 2004 p: 7 October 2019	(unnamed moon of Saturn)	S/2004 S 24	—	—	Sheppard, Jewitt, Kleyna
i: 12 December 2004 p: 7 October 2019	Gerd	S/2004 S 25	—	Saturn LVII	Sheppard, Jewitt, Kleyna
i: 12 December 2004 p: 7 October 2019	(unnamed moon of Saturn)	S/2004 S 26	—	Saturn LVIII	Sheppard, Jewitt, Kleyna
i: 12 December 2004 p: 7 October 2019	Eggther	S/2004 S 27	—	Saturn LIX	Sheppard, Jewitt, Kleyna
i: 12 December 2004 p: 7 October 2019	(unnamed moons of Saturn)	S/2004 S 28	—	—	Sheppard, Jewitt, Kleyna
i: 12 December 2004 p: 7 October 2019	(unnamed moons of Saturn)	S/2004 S 29	—	Saturn LX	Sheppard, Jewitt, Kleyna
i: 12 December 2004 p: 7 October 2019	Beli	S/2004 S 30	—	Saturn LXI	Sheppard, Jewitt, Kleyna
i: 12 December 2004 p: 8 October 2019					Sheppard, Jewitt, Kleyna
i: 12 December 2004 p: 8 October 2019	(unnamed moon of Saturn)	S/2004 S 31	—	—	Sheppard, Jewitt, Kleyna
i: 12 December 2004 p: 8 October 2019	Gunnlod	S/2004 S 32	—	Saturn LXII	Sheppard, Jewitt, Kleyna
i: 12 December 2004 p: 8 October 2019	Thiazzi	S/2004 S 33	—	Saturn LXIII	Sheppard, Jewitt, Kleyna
i: 12 December 2004 p: 8 October 2019	(unnamed moon of Saturn)	S/2004 S 34	—	Saturn LXIV	Sheppard, Jewitt, Kleyna
i: 12 December 2004 p: 8 October 2019	Alvaldi	S/2004 S 35	—	Saturn LXV	Sheppard, Jewitt, Kleyna
i: 12 December 2004 p: 8 October 2019	(unnamed moons of Saturn)	S/2004 S 36	—	—	Sheppard, Jewitt, Kleyna
i: 12 December 2004 p: 8 October 2019	(unnamed moons of Saturn)	S/2004 S 37	—	—	Sheppard, Jewitt, Kleyna
i: 12 December 2004 p: 8 October 2019	Geirrod	S/2004 S 38	—	Saturn LXVI	Sheppard, Jewitt, Kleyna
i: 12 December 2004 p: 8 October 2019	(unnamed moon of Saturn)	S/2004 S 39	—	—	Sheppard, Jewitt, Kleyna
Date	Name	Temporary designation	Image	Permanent designation	Discoverer(s) and notes

=== 2020s ===
2020s
Date	Name	Temporary designation	Image	Permanent designation	Discoverer(s) and notes
i: 5 February 2003 p: 15 November 2021	(unnamed moon of Jupiter)	S/2003 J 24	—	—	Sheppard, Jewitt, Kleyna, Gladman, Veillet
i: 1 July 2019 p: 16 November 2021	(unnamed moon of Saturn)	S/2019 S 1		—	Ashton, Gladman, Petit, Alexandersen
i: 27 September 2011 p: 20 December 2022	(unnamed moons of Jupiter)	S/2011 J 3	—	—	Sheppard
i: 12 May 2018 p: 20 December 2022	(unnamed moons of Jupiter)	S/2018 J 2	—	—	Sheppard
i: 9 March 2016 p: 5 January 2023	(unnamed moons of Jupiter)	S/2016 J 3		—	Sheppard
i: 12 August 2021 p: 5 January 2023	(unnamed moons of Jupiter)	S/2021 J 1	—	—	Sheppard
i: 12 May 2018 p: 19 January 2023	(unnamed moons of Jupiter)	S/2018 J 3	—	—	Sheppard
i: 12 August 2021 p: 19 January 2023	(unnamed moons of Jupiter)	S/2021 J 2	—	—	Sheppard
i: 12 August 2021 p: 19 January 2023	(unnamed moons of Jupiter)	S/2021 J 3	—	—	Sheppard
i: 14 August 2021 p: 19 January 2023	(unnamed moons of Jupiter)	S/2021 J 4	—	—	Sheppard
i: 5 September 2021 p: 19 January 2023	(unnamed moons of Jupiter)	S/2021 J 5	—	—	Sheppard, Tholen, Trujillo
i: 11 May 2018 p: 20 January 2023	(unnamed moons of Jupiter)	S/2018 J 4		—	Sheppard
i: 5 September 2021 p: 20 January 2023	(unnamed moons of Jupiter)	S/2021 J 6	—	—	Sheppard, Tholen, Trujillo
i: 9 March 2016 p: 24 January 2023	(unnamed moons of Jupiter)	S/2016 J 4	—	—	Sheppard
i: 30 August 2022 p: 22 February 2023	(unnamed moons of Jupiter)	S/2022 J 1	—	—	Sheppard
i: 15 October 2022 p: 22 February 2023	(unnamed moons of Jupiter)	S/2022 J 2	—	—	Sheppard
i: 30 August 2022 p: 22 February 2023	(unnamed moons of Jupiter)	S/2022 J 3	—	—	Sheppard
i: 24 June 2020 p: 3 May 2023	(unnamed moons of Saturn)	S/2020 S 1	—	—	Sheppard, Jewitt, Kleyna, Ashton, Gladman, Petit, Alexandersen
i: 1 February 2006 p: 3 May 2023	(unnamed moons of Saturn)	S/2006 S 9	—	—	Sheppard, Jewitt, Kleyna, Ashton, Gladman, Petit, Alexandersen
i: 18 January 2007 p: 3 May 2023	(unnamed moons of Saturn)	S/2007 S 5	—	—	Sheppard, Jewitt, Kleyna, Ashton, Gladman, Petit, Alexandersen
i: 12 December 2004 p: 3 May 2023	(unnamed moons of Saturn)	S/2004 S 40	—	—	Jewitt, Sheppard, Ashton, Gladman, Petit, Alexandersen
i: 3 July 2019 p: 3 May 2023	(unnamed moons of Saturn)	S/2019 S 2	—	—	Ashton, Gladman, Petit, Alexandersen
i: 3 July 2019 p: 3 May 2023	(unnamed moons of Saturn)	S/2019 S 3	—	—	Sheppard, Jewitt, Kleyna, Ashton, Gladman, Petit, Alexandersen
i: 27 June 2020 p: 3 May 2023	(unnamed moons of Saturn)	S/2020 S 2	—	—	Ashton, Gladman, Petit, Alexandersen
i: 24 June 2020 p: 5 May 2023	(unnamed moons of Saturn)	S/2020 S 3	—	—	Ashton, Gladman, Petit, Alexandersen
i: 3 July 2019 p: 5 May 2023	(unnamed moons of Saturn)	S/2019 S 4	—	—	Ashton, Gladman
i: 12 December 2004 p: 6 May 2023	(unnamed moons of Saturn)	S/2004 S 41	—	—	Sheppard, Jewitt, Kleyna, Ashton, Gladman, Petit, Alexandersen
i: 24 June 2020 p: 6 May 2023	(unnamed moons of Saturn)	S/2020 S 4	—	—	Ashton, Gladman, Petit, Alexandersen
i: 24 June 2020 p: 6 May 2023	(unnamed moons of Saturn)	S/2020 S 5	—	—	Ashton, Gladman, Petit, Alexandersen
i: 16 January 2007 p: 6 May 2023	(unnamed moons of Saturn)	S/2007 S 6	—	—	Sheppard, Jewitt, Kleyna, Ashton, Gladman, Petit, Alexandersen
i: 12 December 2004 p: 6 May 2023	(unnamed moons of Saturn)	S/2004 S 42	—	—	Sheppard, Jewitt, Kleyna, Ashton, Gladman, Petit, Alexandersen
i: 5 January 2006 p: 6 May 2023	(unnamed moons of Saturn)	S/2006 S 10	—	—	Sheppard, Jewitt, Kleyna, Ashton, Gladman, Petit, Alexandersen
i: 3 July 2019 p: 6 May 2023	(unnamed moons of Saturn)	S/2019 S 5	—	—	Ashton, Gladman
i: 12 December 2004 p: 7 May 2023	(unnamed moons of Saturn)	S/2004 S 43	—	—	Sheppard, Jewitt, Kleyna, Ashton, Gladman, Petit, Alexandersen
i: 12 December 2004 p: 7 May 2023	(unnamed moons of Saturn)	S/2004 S 44	—	—	Sheppard, Jewitt, Kleyna, Ashton, Gladman
i: 13 December 2004 p: 7 May 2023	(unnamed moons of Saturn)	S/2004 S 45	—	—	Jewitt, Sheppard, Kleyna, Ashton, Gladman, Petit, Alexandersen
i: 5 January 2006 p: 7 May 2023	(unnamed moons of Saturn)	S/2006 S 11	—	—	Sheppard, Jewitt, Kleyna, Ashton, Gladman, Petit, Alexandersen
i: 5 January 2006 p: 7 May 2023	(unnamed moons of Saturn)	S/2006 S 12	—	—	Sheppard, Jewitt, Kleyna, Ashton, Gladman, Petit, Alexandersen
i: 3 July 2019 p: 8 May 2023	(unnamed moons of Saturn)	S/2019 S 6	—	—	Ashton, Gladman
i: 6 January 2006 p: 8 May 2023	(unnamed moons of Saturn)	S/2006 S 13	—	—	Sheppard, Jewitt, Kleyna, Ashton, Gladman, Petit, Alexandersen
i: 1 July 2019 p: 8 May 2023	(unnamed moons of Saturn)	S/2019 S 7	—	—	Ashton, Gladman
i: 3 July 2019 p: 8 May 2023	(unnamed moons of Saturn)	S/2019 S 8	—	—	Ashton, Gladman, Petit, Alexandersen
i: 1 July 2019 p: 8 May 2023	(unnamed moons of Saturn)	S/2019 S 9	—	—	Sheppard, Jewitt, Ashton, Gladman
i: 12 December 2004 p: 8 May 2023	(unnamed moons of Saturn)	S/2004 S 46	—	—	Sheppard, Jewitt, Ashton, Gladman, Petit, Alexandersen
i: 1 July 2019 p: 8 May 2023	(unnamed moons of Saturn)	S/2019 S 10	—	—	Ashton, Gladman, Petit, Alexandersen
i: 12 December 2004 p: 8 May 2023	(unnamed moons of Saturn)	S/2004 S 47	—	—	Sheppard, Jewitt, Kleyna, Ashton, Gladman, Petit, Alexandersen
i: 1 July 2019 p: 8 May 2023	(unnamed moons of Saturn)	S/2019 S 11	—	—	Sheppard, Jewitt, Ashton, Gladman, Petit, Alexandersen
i: 5 January 2006 p: 8 May 2023	(unnamed moons of Saturn)	S/2006 S 14	—	—	Sheppard, Jewitt, Kleyna, Ashton, Gladman, Petit, Alexandersen
i: 3 July 2019 p: 9May 2023	(unnamed moons of Saturn)	S/2019 S 12	—	—	Ashton, Gladman
i: 27 June 2020 p: 9 May 2023	(unnamed moons of Saturn)	S/2020 S 6	—	—	Ashton, Gladman, Petit, Alexandersen
i: 3 July 2019 p: 9 May 2023	(unnamed moons of Saturn)	S/2019 S 13	—	—	Ashton, Gladman, Petit, Alexandersen
i: 5 January 2005 p: 10 May 2023	(unnamed moons of Saturn)	S/2005 S 4	—	—	Sheppard, Jewitt, Kleyna, Ashton, Gladman, Petit, Alexandersen
i: 16 January 2007 p: 10 May 2023	(unnamed moons of Saturn)	S/2007 S 7	—	—	Sheppard, Jewitt, Kleyna
i: 21 March 2007 p: 10 May 2023	(unnamed moons of Saturn)	S/2007 S 8	—	—	Sheppard, Jewitt, Kleyna, Ashton, Gladman, Petit, Alexandersen
i: 24 June 2020 p: 10 May 2023	(unnamed moons of Saturn)	S/2020 S 7	—	—	Ashton, Gladman, Petit, Alexandersen
i: 1 July 2019 p: 10 May 2023	(unnamed moons of Saturn)	S/2019 S 14	—	—	Ashton, Gladman
i: 1 July 2019 p: 10 May 2023	(unnamed moons of Saturn)	S/2019 S 15	—	—	Ashton, Gladman, Petit, Alexandersen
i: 9 March 2005 p: 10 May 2023	(unnamed moons of Saturn)	S/2005 S 5	—	—	Sheppard, Jewitt, Kleyna, Ashton, Gladman, Petit, Alexandersen
i: 5 January 2006 p: 15 May 2023	(unnamed moons of Saturn)	S/2006 S 15	—	—	Sheppard, Jewitt, Kleyna, Ashton, Gladman
i: 1 February 2006 p: 15 May 2023	(unnamed moons of Saturn)	S/2006 S 16	—	—	Sheppard, Jewitt, Kleyna, Ashton, Gladman, Petit, Alexandersen
i: 5 January 2006 p: 15 May 2023	(unnamed moons of Saturn)	S/2006 S 17	—	—	Sheppard, Jewitt, Kleyna, Ashton, Gladman
i: 12 December 2004 p: 15 May 2023	(unnamed moons of Saturn)	S/2004 S 48	—	—	Jewitt, Sheppard, Ashton, Gladman, Petit, Alexandersen
i: 27 June 2020 p: 15 May 2023	(unnamed moons of Saturn)	S/2020 S 8	—	—	Sheppard, Jewitt, Kleyna, Ashton, Gladman, Petit, Alexandersen
i: 13 December 2004 p: 15 May 2023	(unnamed moons of Saturn)	S/2004 S 49	—	—	Sheppard, Jewitt, Kleyna, Ashton, Gladman, Petit, Alexandersen
i: 12 December 2004 p: 15 May 2023	(unnamed moons of Saturn)	S/2004 S 50	—	—	Sheppard, Jewitt, Ashton, Gladman, Petit, Alexandersen
i: 5 January 2006 p: 15 May 2023	(unnamed moons of Saturn)	S/2006 S 18	—	—	Sheppard, Jewitt, Kleyna, Ashton, Gladman, Petit, Alexandersen
i: 3 July 2019 p: 15 May 2023	(unnamed moons of Saturn)	S/2019 S 16	—	—	Ashton, Gladman, Petit, Alexandersen
i: 1 July 2019 p: 15 May 2023	(unnamed moons of Saturn)	S/2019 S 17	—	—	Sheppard, Jewitt, Ashton, Gladman, Petit, Alexandersen
i: 3 July 2019 p: 15 May 2023	(unnamed moons of Saturn)	S/2019 S 18	—	—	Sheppard, Jewitt, Ashton, Gladman, Petit, Alexandersen
i: 3 July 2019 p: 15 May 2023	(unnamed moons of Saturn)	S/2019 S 19	—	—	Ashton, Gladman
i: 1 July 2019 p: 15 May 2023	(unnamed moons of Saturn)	S/2019 S 20	—	—	Ashton, Gladman, Petit, Alexandersen
i: 5 January 2006 p: 15 May 2023	(unnamed moons of Saturn)	S/2006 S 19	—	—	Sheppard, Jewitt, Kleyna, Ashton, Gladman, Petit, Alexandersen
i: 12 December 2004 p: 15 May 2023	(unnamed moons of Saturn)	S/2004 S 51	—	—	Sheppard, Jewitt, Kleyna, Ashton, Gladman, Petit, Alexandersen
i: 27 June 2020 p: 15 May 2023	(unnamed moons of Saturn)	S/2020 S 9	—	—	Ashton, Gladman, Petit, Alexandersen
i: 12 December 2004 p: 15 May 2023	(unnamed moons of Saturn)	S/2004 S 52	—	—	Jewitt, Sheppard, Ashton, Gladman, Petit, Alexandersen
i: 21 March 2007 p: 16 May 2023	(unnamed moons of Saturn)	S/2007 S 9	—	—	Sheppard, Jewitt, Kleyna, Ashton, Gladman
i: 12 December 2004 p: 16 May 2023	(unnamed moons of Saturn)	S/2004 S 53	—	—	Sheppard, Jewitt, Kleyna, Ashton, Gladman, Petit, Alexandersen
i: 27 June 2020 p: 16 May 2023	(unnamed moons of Saturn)	S/2020 S 10	—	—	Ashton, Gladman, Petit, Alexandersen
i: 3 July 2019 p: 16 May 2023	(unnamed moons of Saturn)	S/2019 S 21	—	—	Sheppard, Jewitt, Kleyna, Ashton, Gladman, Petit, Alexandersen
i: 5 January 2006 p: 23 May 2023	(unnamed moons of Saturn)	S/2006 S 20	—	—	Sheppard, Jewitt, Kleyna, Ashton, Gladman, Petit, Alexandersen
i: 7 September 2021 p: 23 February 2024	(unnamed moon of Neptune)	S/2021 N 1		—	Sheppard, Tholen, Trujillo, Lykawka
i: 4 November 2023 p: 23 February 2024	(unnamed moon of Uranus)	S/2023 U 1	—	—	Sheppard
i: 14 August 2002 p: 23 February 2024	(unnamed moon of Neptune)	S/2002 N 5*		—	Sheppard (recovered) (originally published in 2004 as lost moon c02N4)
i: 23 August 2019 p: 11 March 2025	(unnamed moons of Saturn)	S/2019 S 22	—	—	Ashton, Gladman, Petit, Alexandersen, Fraser, Lawler, Kavelaars
i: 1 July 2019 p: 11 March 2025	(unnamed moons of Saturn)	S/2019 S 23	—	—	Ashton, Gladman, Petit, Alexandersen, Fraser, Lawler, Kavelaars
i: 1 July 2019 p: 11 March 2025	(unnamed moons of Saturn)	S/2019 S 26	—	—	Ashton, Gladman, Petit, Alexandersen, Fraser, Lawler, Kavelaars
i: 22 August 2019 p: 11 March 2025	(unnamed moons of Saturn)	S/2019 S 32	—	—	Ashton, Gladman, Petit, Alexandersen, Fraser, Lawler, Kavelaars
i: 2 July 2019 p: 11 March 2025	(unnamed moons of Saturn)	S/2019 S 35	—	—	Ashton, Gladman, Petit, Alexandersen, Fraser, Lawler, Kavelaars
i: 3 July 2019 p: 11 March 2025	(unnamed moons of Saturn)	S/2019 S 37	—	—	Ashton, Gladman, Petit, Alexandersen, Fraser, Lawler, Kavelaars
i: 2 July 2019 p: 11 March 2025	(unnamed moons of Saturn)	S/2019 S 41	—	—	Ashton, Gladman, Petit, Alexandersen, Fraser, Lawler, Kavelaars
i: 3 July 2019 p: 11 March 2025	(unnamed moons of Saturn)	S/2019 S 44	—	—	Ashton, Gladman, Petit, Alexandersen, Fraser, Lawler, Kavelaars
i: 27 June 2020 p: 11 March 2025	(unnamed moons of Saturn)	S/2020 S 11	—	—	Ashton, Gladman, Petit, Alexandersen, Fraser, Lawler, Kavelaars
i: 24 June 2020 p: 11 March 2025	(unnamed moons of Saturn)	S/2020 S 12	—	—	Ashton, Gladman, Petit, Alexandersen, Fraser, Lawler, Kavelaars
i: 27 June 2020 p: 11 March 2025	(unnamed moons of Saturn)	S/2020 S 13	—	—	Ashton, Gladman, Petit, Alexandersen, Fraser, Lawler, Kavelaars
i: 24 June 2020 p: 11 March 2025	(unnamed moons of Saturn)	S/2020 S 16	—	—	Ashton, Gladman, Petit, Alexandersen, Fraser, Lawler, Kavelaars
i: 24 June 2020 p: 11 March 2025	(unnamed moons of Saturn)	S/2020 S 17	—	—	Ashton, Gladman, Petit, Alexandersen, Fraser, Lawler, Kavelaars
i: 29 June 2020 p: 11 March 2025	(unnamed moons of Saturn)	S/2020 S 19	—	—	Ashton, Gladman, Petit, Alexandersen, Fraser, Lawler, Kavelaars
i: 27 June 2020 p: 11 March 2025	(unnamed moons of Saturn)	S/2020 S 20	—	—	Ashton, Gladman, Petit, Alexandersen, Fraser, Lawler, Kavelaars
i: 24 June 2020 p: 11 March 2025	(unnamed moons of Saturn)	S/2020 S 22	—	—	Ashton, Gladman, Petit, Alexandersen, Fraser, Lawler, Kavelaars
i: 24 June 2020 p: 11 March 2025	(unnamed moons of Saturn)	S/2020 S 23	—	—	Ashton, Gladman, Petit, Alexandersen, Fraser, Lawler, Kavelaars
i: 24 June 2020 p: 11 March 2025	(unnamed moons of Saturn)	S/2020 S 24	—	—	Ashton, Gladman, Petit, Alexandersen, Fraser, Lawler, Kavelaars
i: 24 June 2020 p: 11 March 2025	(unnamed moons of Saturn)	S/2020 S 30	—	—	Ashton, Gladman, Petit, Alexandersen, Fraser, Lawler, Kavelaars
i: 24 June 2020 p: 11 March 2025	(unnamed moons of Saturn)	S/2020 S 31	—	—	Ashton, Gladman, Petit, Alexandersen, Fraser, Lawler, Kavelaars
i: 24 June 2020 p: 11 March 2025	(unnamed moons of Saturn)	S/2020 S 33	—	—	Ashton, Gladman, Petit, Alexandersen, Fraser, Lawler, Kavelaars
i: 24 June 2020 p: 11 March 2025	(unnamed moons of Saturn)	S/2020 S 34	—	—	Ashton, Gladman, Petit, Alexandersen, Fraser, Lawler, Kavelaars
i: 27 June 2020 p: 11 March 2025	(unnamed moons of Saturn)	S/2020 S 38	—	—	Ashton, Gladman, Petit, Alexandersen, Fraser, Lawler, Kavelaars
i: 24 June 2020 p: 11 March 2025	(unnamed moons of Saturn)	S/2020 S 39	—	—	Ashton, Gladman, Petit, Alexandersen, Fraser, Lawler, Kavelaars
i: 27 June 2020 p: 11 March 2025	(unnamed moons of Saturn)	S/2020 S 41	—	—	Ashton, Gladman, Petit, Alexandersen, Fraser, Lawler, Kavelaars
i: 24 June 2020 p: 11 March 2025	(unnamed moons of Saturn)	S/2020 S 42	—	—	Ashton, Gladman, Petit, Alexandersen, Fraser, Lawler, Kavelaars
i: 24 June 2020 p: 11 March 2025	(unnamed moons of Saturn)	S/2020 S 43	—	—	Ashton, Gladman, Petit, Alexandersen, Fraser, Lawler, Kavelaars
i: 24 June 2020 p: 11 March 2025	(unnamed moons of Saturn)	S/2020 S 44	—	—	Ashton, Gladman, Petit, Alexandersen, Fraser, Lawler, Kavelaars
i: 15 August 2023 p: 11 March 2025	(unnamed moons of Saturn)	S/2023 S 1	—	—	Ashton, Gladman, Petit, Alexandersen, Fraser, Lawler, Kavelaars
i: 18 September 2023 p: 11 March 2025	(unnamed moons of Saturn)	S/2023 S 2	—	—	Ashton, Gladman, Petit, Alexandersen, Fraser, Lawler, Kavelaars
i: 19 August 2023 p: 11 March 2025	(unnamed moons of Saturn)	S/2023 S 3	—	—	Ashton, Gladman, Petit, Alexandersen, Fraser, Lawler, Kavelaars
i: 15 August 2023 p: 11 March 2025	(unnamed moons of Saturn)	S/2023 S 5	—	—	Ashton, Gladman, Petit, Alexandersen, Fraser, Lawler, Kavelaars
i: 15 August 2023 p: 11 March 2025	(unnamed moons of Saturn)	S/2023 S 6	—	—	Ashton, Gladman, Petit, Alexandersen, Fraser, Lawler, Kavelaars
i: 15 August 2023 p: 11 March 2025	(unnamed moons of Saturn)	S/2023 S 7	—	—	Ashton, Gladman, Petit, Alexandersen, Fraser, Lawler, Kavelaars
i: 15 August 2023 p: 11 March 2025	(unnamed moons of Saturn)	S/2023 S 8	—	—	Ashton, Gladman, Petit, Alexandersen, Fraser, Lawler, Kavelaars
i: 16 August 2023 p: 11 March 2025	(unnamed moons of Saturn)	S/2023 S 9	—	—	Ashton, Gladman, Petit, Alexandersen, Fraser, Lawler, Kavelaars
i: 15 September 2023 p: 11 March 2025	(unnamed moons of Saturn)	S/2023 S 10	—	—	Ashton, Gladman, Petit, Alexandersen, Fraser, Lawler, Kavelaars
i: 16 August 2023 p: 11 March 2025	(unnamed moons of Saturn)	S/2023 S 13	—	—	Ashton, Gladman, Petit, Alexandersen, Fraser, Lawler, Kavelaars
i: 15 August 2023 p: 11 March 2025	(unnamed moons of Saturn)	S/2023 S 16	—	—	Ashton, Gladman, Petit, Alexandersen, Fraser, Lawler, Kavelaars
i: 15 August 2023 p: 11 March 2025	(unnamed moons of Saturn)	S/2023 S 17	—	—	Ashton, Gladman, Petit, Alexandersen, Fraser, Lawler, Kavelaars
i: 15 August 2023 p: 11 March 2025	(unnamed moons of Saturn)	S/2023 S 18	—	—	Ashton, Gladman, Petit, Alexandersen, Fraser, Lawler, Kavelaars
i: 15 August 2023 p: 11 March 2025	(unnamed moons of Saturn)	S/2023 S 19	—	—	Ashton, Gladman, Petit, Alexandersen, Fraser, Lawler, Kavelaars
i: 15 August 2023 p: 11 March 2025	(unnamed moons of Saturn)	S/2023 S 20	—	—	Ashton, Gladman, Petit, Alexandersen, Fraser, Lawler, Kavelaars
i: 15 August 2023 p: 11 March 2025	(unnamed moons of Saturn)	S/2023 S 21	—	—	Ashton, Gladman, Petit, Alexandersen, Fraser, Lawler, Kavelaars
i: 16 August 2023 p: 11 March 2025	(unnamed moons of Saturn)	S/2023 S 22	—	—	Ashton, Gladman, Petit, Alexandersen, Fraser, Lawler, Kavelaars
i: 16 August 2023 p: 11 March 2025	(unnamed moons of Saturn)	S/2023 S 23	—	—	Ashton, Gladman, Petit, Alexandersen, Fraser, Lawler, Kavelaars
i: 15 August 2023 p: 11 March 2025	(unnamed moons of Saturn)	S/2023 S 24	—	—	Ashton, Gladman, Petit, Alexandersen, Fraser, Lawler, Kavelaars
i: 15 August 2023 p: 11 March 2025	(unnamed moons of Saturn)	S/2023 S 25	—	—	Ashton, Gladman, Petit, Alexandersen, Fraser, Lawler, Kavelaars
i: 16 August 2023 p: 11 March 2025	(unnamed moons of Saturn)	S/2023 S 27	—	—	Ashton, Gladman, Petit, Alexandersen, Fraser, Lawler, Kavelaars
i: 16 August 2023 p: 11 March 2025	(unnamed moons of Saturn)	S/2023 S 29	—	—	Ashton, Gladman, Petit, Alexandersen, Fraser, Lawler, Kavelaars
i: 15 August 2023 p: 11 March 2025	(unnamed moons of Saturn)	S/2023 S 30	—	—	Ashton, Gladman, Petit, Alexandersen, Fraser, Lawler, Kavelaars
i: 16 August 2023 p: 11 March 2025	(unnamed moons of Saturn)	S/2023 S 32	—	—	Ashton, Gladman, Petit, Alexandersen, Fraser, Lawler, Kavelaars
i: 18 September 2023 p: 11 March 2025	(unnamed moons of Saturn)	S/2023 S 33	—	—	Ashton, Gladman, Petit, Alexandersen, Fraser, Lawler, Kavelaars
i: 15 August 2023 p: 11 March 2025	(unnamed moons of Saturn)	S/2023 S 34	—	—	Ashton, Gladman, Petit, Alexandersen, Fraser, Lawler, Kavelaars
i: 15 September 2023 p: 11 March 2025	(unnamed moons of Saturn)	S/2023 S 42	—	—	Ashton, Gladman, Petit, Alexandersen, Fraser, Lawler, Kavelaars
i: 16 August 2023 p: 11 March 2025	(unnamed moons of Saturn)	S/2023 S 43	—	—	Ashton, Gladman, Petit, Alexandersen, Fraser, Lawler, Kavelaars
i: 15 August 2023 p: 11 March 2025	(unnamed moons of Saturn)	S/2023 S 45	—	—	Ashton, Gladman, Petit, Alexandersen, Fraser, Lawler, Kavelaars
i: 16 August 2023 p: 11 March 2025	(unnamed moons of Saturn)	S/2023 S 46	—	—	Ashton, Gladman, Petit, Alexandersen, Fraser, Lawler, Kavelaars
i: 15 August 2023 p: 11 March 2025	(unnamed moons of Saturn)	S/2023 S 47	—	—	Ashton, Gladman, Petit, Alexandersen, Fraser, Lawler, Kavelaars
i: 15 August 2023 p: 11 March 2025	(unnamed moons of Saturn)	S/2023 S 49	—	—	Ashton, Gladman, Petit, Alexandersen, Fraser, Lawler, Kavelaars
i: 15 August 2023 p: 11 March 2025	(unnamed moons of Saturn)	S/2023 S 50	—	—	Ashton, Gladman, Petit, Alexandersen, Fraser, Lawler, Kavelaars
i: 3 July 2019 p: 11 March 2025	(unnamed moons of Saturn)	S/2019 S 28	—	—	Ashton, Gladman, Petit, Alexandersen
i: 3 July 2019 p: 11 March 2025	(unnamed moons of Saturn)	S/2019 S 30	—	—	Ashton, Gladman, Petit, Alexandersen
i: 1 July 2019 p: 11 March 2025	(unnamed moons of Saturn)	S/2019 S 36	—	—	Ashton, Gladman, Petit, Alexandersen
i: 3 July 2019 p: 11 March 2025	(unnamed moons of Saturn)	S/2019 S 38	—	—	Ashton, Gladman, Petit, Alexandersen
i: 3 July 2019 p: 11 March 2025	(unnamed moons of Saturn)	S/2019 S 39	—	—	Ashton, Gladman, Petit, Alexandersen
i: 27 June 2020 p: 11 March 2025	(unnamed moons of Saturn)	S/2020 S 14	—	—	Ashton, Gladman, Petit, Alexandersen
i: 24 June 2020 p: 11 March 2025	(unnamed moons of Saturn)	S/2020 S 15	—	—	Ashton, Gladman, Petit, Alexandersen
i: 24 June 2020 p: 11 March 2025	(unnamed moons of Saturn)	S/2020 S 18	—	—	Ashton, Gladman, Petit, Alexandersen
i: 27 June 2020 p: 11 March 2025	(unnamed moons of Saturn)	S/2020 S 21	—	—	Ashton, Gladman, Petit, Alexandersen
i: 29 June 2020 p: 11 March 2025	(unnamed moons of Saturn)	S/2020 S 25	—	—	Ashton, Gladman, Petit, Alexandersen
i: 29 June 2020 p: 11 March 2025	(unnamed moons of Saturn)	S/2020 S 28	—	—	Ashton, Gladman, Petit, Alexandersen
i: 27 June 2020 p: 11 March 2025	(unnamed moons of Saturn)	S/2020 S 29	—	—	Ashton, Gladman, Petit, Alexandersen
i: 24 June 2020 p: 11 March 2025	(unnamed moons of Saturn)	S/2020 S 32	—	—	Ashton, Gladman, Petit, Alexandersen
i: 24 June 2020 p: 11 March 2025	(unnamed moons of Saturn)	S/2020 S 35	—	—	Ashton, Gladman, Petit, Alexandersen
i: 29 June 2020 p: 11 March 2025	(unnamed moons of Saturn)	S/2020 S 36	—	—	Ashton, Gladman, Petit, Alexandersen
i: 20 July 2020 p: 11 March 2025	(unnamed moons of Saturn)	S/2020 S 37	—	—	Ashton, Gladman, Petit, Alexandersen
i: 24 June 2020 p: 11 March 2025	(unnamed moons of Saturn)	S/2020 S 40	—	—	Ashton, Gladman, Petit, Alexandersen
i: 15 August 2023 p: 11 March 2025	(unnamed moons of Saturn)	S/2023 S 4	—	—	Ashton, Gladman, Petit, Alexandersen
i: 15 August 2023 p: 11 March 2025	(unnamed moons of Saturn)	S/2023 S 11	—	—	Ashton, Gladman, Petit, Alexandersen
i: 15 August 2023 p: 11 March 2025	(unnamed moons of Saturn)	S/2023 S 12	—	—	Ashton, Gladman, Petit, Alexandersen
i: 16 August 2023 p: 11 March 2025	(unnamed moons of Saturn)	S/2023 S 14	—	—	Ashton, Gladman, Petit, Alexandersen
i: 15 August 2023 p: 11 March 2025	(unnamed moons of Saturn)	S/2023 S 15	—	—	Ashton, Gladman, Petit, Alexandersen
i: 15 August 2023 p: 11 March 2025	(unnamed moons of Saturn)	S/2023 S 26	—	—	Ashton, Gladman, Petit, Alexandersen
i: 15 August 2023 p: 11 March 2025	(unnamed moons of Saturn)	S/2023 S 28	—	—	Ashton, Gladman, Petit, Alexandersen
i: 15 August 2023 p: 11 March 2025	(unnamed moons of Saturn)	S/2023 S 31	—	—	Ashton, Gladman, Petit, Alexandersen
i: 16 August 2023 p: 11 March 2025	(unnamed moons of Saturn)	S/2023 S 35	—	—	Ashton, Gladman, Petit, Alexandersen
i: 15 August 2023 p: 11 March 2025	(unnamed moons of Saturn)	S/2023 S 36	—	—	Ashton, Gladman, Petit, Alexandersen
i: 15 August 2023 p: 11 March 2025	(unnamed moons of Saturn)	S/2023 S 37	—	—	Ashton, Gladman, Petit, Alexandersen
i: 15 August 2023 p: 11 March 2025	(unnamed moons of Saturn)	S/2023 S 38	—	—	Ashton, Gladman, Petit, Alexandersen
i: 15 August 2023 p: 11 March 2025	(unnamed moons of Saturn)	S/2023 S 39	—	—	Ashton, Gladman, Petit, Alexandersen
i: 16 August 2023 p: 11 March 2025	(unnamed moons of Saturn)	S/2023 S 40	—	—	Ashton, Gladman, Petit, Alexandersen
i: 15 August 2023 p: 11 March 2025	(unnamed moons of Saturn)	S/2023 S 41	—	—	Ashton, Gladman, Petit, Alexandersen
i: 15 August 2023 p: 11 March 2025	(unnamed moons of Saturn)	S/2023 S 44	—	—	Ashton, Gladman, Petit, Alexandersen
i: 15 August 2023 p: 11 March 2025	(unnamed moons of Saturn)	S/2023 S 48	—	—	Ashton, Gladman, Petit, Alexandersen
i: 12 December 2004 p: 11 March 2025	(unnamed moons of Saturn)	S/2004 S 54	—	—	Sheppard, Jewitt, Ashton, Gladman, Petit, Alexandersen, Kleyna
i: 12 December 2004 p: 11 March 2025	(unnamed moons of Saturn)	S/2004 S 55	—	—	Sheppard, Jewitt, Ashton, Gladman, Petit, Alexandersen, Kleyna
i: 12 December 2004 p: 11 March 2025	(unnamed moons of Saturn)	S/2004 S 56	—	—	Sheppard, Jewitt, Ashton, Gladman, Petit, Alexandersen, Kleyna
i: 12 December 2004 p: 11 March 2025	(unnamed moons of Saturn)	S/2004 S 57	—	—	Sheppard, Jewitt, Ashton, Gladman, Petit, Alexandersen, Kleyna
i: 12 December 2004 p: 11 March 2025	(unnamed moons of Saturn)	S/2004 S 58	—	—	Sheppard, Jewitt, Ashton, Gladman, Petit, Alexandersen, Kleyna
i: 12 December 2004 p: 11 March 2025	(unnamed moons of Saturn)	S/2004 S 59	—	—	Sheppard, Jewitt, Ashton, Gladman, Petit, Alexandersen, Kleyna
i: 12 December 2004 p: 11 March 2025	(unnamed moons of Saturn)	S/2004 S 60	—	—	Sheppard, Jewitt, Ashton, Gladman, Petit, Alexandersen, Kleyna
i: 12 December 2004 p: 11 March 2025	(unnamed moons of Saturn)	S/2004 S 61	—	—	Sheppard, Jewitt, Ashton, Gladman, Petit, Alexandersen, Kleyna
i: 5 January 2005 p: 11 March 2025	(unnamed moons of Saturn)	S/2005 S 6	—	—	Sheppard, Jewitt, Ashton, Gladman, Petit, Alexandersen, Kleyna
i: 5 January 2005 p: 11 March 2025	(unnamed moons of Saturn)	S/2005 S 7	—	—	Sheppard, Jewitt, Ashton, Gladman, Petit, Alexandersen, Kleyna
i: 6 January 2006 p: 11 March 2025	(unnamed moons of Saturn)	S/2006 S 21	—	—	Sheppard, Jewitt, Ashton, Gladman, Petit, Alexandersen, Kleyna
i: 6 January 2006 p: 11 March 2025	(unnamed moons of Saturn)	S/2006 S 22	—	—	Sheppard, Jewitt, Ashton, Gladman, Petit, Alexandersen, Kleyna
i: 1 February 2006 p: 11 March 2025	(unnamed moons of Saturn)	S/2006 S 23	—	—	Sheppard, Jewitt, Ashton, Gladman, Petit, Alexandersen, Kleyna
i: 1 February 2006 p: 11 March 2025	(unnamed moons of Saturn)	S/2006 S 24	—	—	Sheppard, Jewitt, Ashton, Gladman, Petit, Alexandersen, Kleyna
i: 5 January 2006 p: 11 March 2025	(unnamed moons of Saturn)	S/2006 S 25	—	—	Sheppard, Jewitt, Ashton, Gladman, Petit, Alexandersen, Kleyna
i: 5 January 2006 p: 11 March 2025	(unnamed moons of Saturn)	S/2006 S 26	—	—	Sheppard, Jewitt, Ashton, Gladman, Petit, Alexandersen, Kleyna
i: 5 January 2006 p: 11 March 2025	(unnamed moons of Saturn)	S/2006 S 27	—	—	Sheppard, Jewitt, Ashton, Gladman, Petit, Alexandersen, Kleyna
i: 5 January 2006 p: 11 March 2025	(unnamed moons of Saturn)	S/2006 S 28	—	—	Sheppard, Jewitt, Ashton, Gladman, Petit, Alexandersen, Kleyna
i: 1 February 2006 p: 11 March 2025	(unnamed moons of Saturn)	S/2006 S 29	—	—	Sheppard, Jewitt, Ashton, Gladman, Petit, Alexandersen, Kleyna
i: 18 January 2007 p: 11 March 2025	(unnamed moons of Saturn)	S/2007 S 10	—	—	Sheppard, Jewitt, Ashton, Gladman, Petit, Alexandersen, Kleyna
i: 18 January 2007 p: 11 March 2025	(unnamed moons of Saturn)	S/2007 S 11	—	—	Sheppard, Jewitt, Ashton, Gladman, Petit, Alexandersen, Kleyna
i: 3 July 2019 p: 11 March 2025	(unnamed moons of Saturn)	S/2019 S 24	—	—	Ashton, Gladman, Petit, Alexandersen, Fraser, Lawler, Kavelaars
i: 3 July 2019 p: 11 March 2025	(unnamed moons of Saturn)	S/2019 S 25	—	—	Ashton, Gladman, Petit, Alexandersen, Fraser, Lawler, Kavelaars
i: 3 July 2019 p: 11 March 2025	(unnamed moons of Saturn)	S/2019 S 27	—	—	Ashton, Gladman, Petit, Alexandersen, Fraser, Lawler, Kavelaars
i: 3 July 2019 p: 11 March 2025	(unnamed moons of Saturn)	S/2019 S 29	—	—	Ashton, Gladman, Petit, Alexandersen, Fraser, Lawler, Kavelaars
i: 1 July 2019 p: 11 March 2025	(unnamed moons of Saturn)	S/2019 S 31	—	—	Ashton, Gladman, Petit, Alexandersen, Fraser, Lawler, Kavelaars
i: 2 July 2019 p: 11 March 2025	(unnamed moons of Saturn)	S/2019 S 33	—	—	Ashton, Gladman, Petit, Alexandersen, Fraser, Lawler, Kavelaars
i: 3 July 2019 p: 11 March 2025	(unnamed moons of Saturn)	S/2019 S 34	—	—	Ashton, Gladman, Petit, Alexandersen, Fraser, Lawler, Kavelaars
i: 3 July 2019 p: 11 March 2025	(unnamed moons of Saturn)	S/2019 S 40	—	—	Ashton, Gladman, Petit, Alexandersen, Fraser, Lawler, Kavelaars
i: 3 July 2019 p: 11 March 2025	(unnamed moons of Saturn)	S/2019 S 42	—	—	Ashton, Gladman, Petit, Alexandersen, Fraser, Lawler, Kavelaars
i: 3 July 2019 p: 11 March 2025	(unnamed moons of Saturn)	S/2019 S 43	—	—	Ashton, Gladman, Petit, Alexandersen, Fraser, Lawler, Kavelaars
i: 27 June 2020 p: 11 March 2025	(unnamed moons of Saturn)	S/2020 S 26	—	—	Ashton, Gladman, Petit, Alexandersen, Fraser, Lawler, Kavelaars
i: 27 June 2020 p: 11 March 2025	(unnamed moons of Saturn)	S/2020 S 27	—	—	Ashton, Gladman, Petit, Alexandersen, Fraser, Lawler, Kavelaars
i: 23 March 2017 p: 30 April 2025	(unnamed moons of Jupiter)	S/2017 J 10		—	Sheppard
i: 25 March 2017 p: 30 April 2025	(unnamed moons of Jupiter)	S/2017 J 11	―	―	Sheppard
i: 2 February 2025 p: 19 August 2025	(unnamed moon of Uranus)	S/2025 U 1		Uranus XXVIII	M. El Moutamid et al.
i: 27 September 2011 p: 16 March 2026	(unnamed moons of Jupiter)	S/2011 J 4	—	—	Sheppard
i: 27 September 2011 p: 16 March 2026	(unnamed moons of Jupiter)	S/2011 J 5	—	—	Sheppard
i: 12 May 2018 p: 16 March 2026	(unnamed moons of Jupiter)	S/2018 J 5	—	—	Sheppard
i: 2 December 2024 p: 16 March 2026	(unnamed moons of Jupiter)	S/2024 J 1	—	—	Sheppard
i: 24 June 2020 p: 16 March 2026	(unnamed moons of Saturn)	S/2020 S 45	—	—	Ashton et al.
i: 24 June 2020 p: 16 March 2026	(unnamed moons of Saturn)	S/2020 S 48	—	—	Ashton et al.
i: 27 June 2020 p: 16 March 2026	(unnamed moons of Saturn)	S/2020 S 46	—	—	Ashton et al.
i: 28 June 2020 p: 16 March 2026	(unnamed moons of Saturn)	S/2020 S 47	—	—	Ashton et al.
i: 15 August 2023 p: 16 March 2026	(unnamed moons of Saturn)	S/2023 S 56	—	—	Ashton et al.
i: 15 August 2023 p: 16 March 2026	(unnamed moons of Saturn)	S/2023 S 57	—	—	Ashton et al.
i: 16 August 2023 p: 16 March 2026	(unnamed moons of Saturn)	S/2023 S 51	—	—	Ashton et al.
i: 16 August 2023 p: 16 March 2026	(unnamed moons of Saturn)	S/2023 S 54	—	—	Ashton et al.
i: 16 August 2023 p: 16 March 2026	(unnamed moons of Saturn)	S/2023 S 55	—	—	Ashton et al.
i: 15 September 2023 p: 16 March 2026	(unnamed moons of Saturn)	S/2023 S 52	—	—	Ashton et al.
i: 15 September 2023 p: 16 March 2026	(unnamed moons of Saturn)	S/2023 S 53	—	—	Ashton et al.
i: 11 September 2010 p: 9 April 2026	(unnamed moons of Jupiter)	S/2010 J 3	—	—	Sheppard
i: 11 September 2010 p: 9 April 2026	(unnamed moons of Jupiter)	S/2010 J 4	—	—	Sheppard
i: 20 October 2011 p: 9 April 2026	(unnamed moons of Jupiter)	S/2011 J 6	—	—	Sheppard
i: 23 March 2017 p: 9 April 2026	(unnamed moons of Jupiter)	S/2017 J 12	—	—	Sheppard
i: 23 March 2017 p: 9 April 2026	(unnamed moons of Jupiter)	S/2017 J 13	—	—	Sheppard
i: 23 March 2017 p: 9 April 2026	(unnamed moons of Jupiter)	S/2017 J 14	—	—	Sheppard
i: 23 March 2017 p: 9 April 2026	(unnamed moons of Jupiter)	S/2017 J 15	—	—	Sheppard
i: 23 March 2017 p: 9 April 2026	(unnamed moons of Jupiter)	S/2017 J 16	—	—	Sheppard
i: 23 March 2017 p: 9 April 2026	(unnamed moons of Jupiter)	S/2017 J 17	—	—	Sheppard
i: 23 March 2017 p: 9 April 2026	(unnamed moons of Jupiter)	S/2017 J 18	—	—	Sheppard
i: 8 September 2010 p: 9 April 2026	(unnamed moons of Jupiter)	S/2010 J 5	—	—	Ashton, Beaudoin, Gladman, Deen
i: 12 September 2010 p: 9 April 2026	(unnamed moons of Jupiter)	S/2010 J 6	—	—	Sheppard
i: 2 September 2021 p: 9 April 2026	(unnamed moons of Jupiter)	S/2021 J 7	—	—	Sheppard
i: 5 September 2021 p: 9 April 2026	(unnamed moons of Jupiter)	S/2021 J 8	—	—	Sheppard, Tholen, Trujillo
i: 15 August 2023 p: 9 April 2026	(unnamed moons of Saturn)	S/2023 S 58	—	—	Ashton, Gladman, Petit, Alexandersen, Fraser, Lawler, Kavelaars
i: 15 August 2023 p: 9 April 2026	(unnamed moons of Saturn)	S/2023 S 59	—	—	Ashton, Gladman, Petit, Alexandersen, Fraser, Lawler, Kavelaars
i: 16 August 2023 p: 9 April 2026	(unnamed moons of Saturn)	S/2023 S 60	—	—	Ashton, Gladman, Petit, Alexandersen, Fraser, Lawler, Kavelaars
i: 16 August 2023 p: 9 April 2026	(unnamed moons of Saturn)	S/2023 S 61	—	—	Ashton, Gladman, Petit, Alexandersen, Fraser, Lawler, Kavelaars
i: 15 September 2023 p: 9 April 2026	(unnamed moons of Saturn)	S/2023 S 62	—	—	Ashton, Gladman, Petit, Alexandersen, Fraser, Lawler, Kavelaars
i: 24 June 2020 p: 9 April 2026	(unnamed moons of Saturn)	S/2020 S 49	—	—	Ashton, Gladman, Petit, Alexandersen
i: 15 September 2023 p: 9 April 2026	(unnamed moons of Saturn)	S/2023 S 63	—	—	Ashton, Gladman, Petit, Alexandersen
i: 2009 p: 17 June 2026	(unnamed moons of Saturn)	S/2009 S 2		—	J. Spitale
Date	Name	Temporary designation	Image	Permanent designation	Discoverer(s) and notes

== See also ==
- Timeline of Solar System astronomy
- Timeline of Solar System exploration
- Lists of astronomical objects
- Solar System
