= Iocaste (moon) =

Retrograde irregular satellite of Jupiter

- Iocaste imaged by the Canada-France-Hawaii Telescope in December 2001

Discovery
- Discovered by: Scott S. Sheppard; David C. Jewitt; Yanga R. Fernandez; Eugene A. Magnier
- Discovery site: Mauna Kea Observatory
- Discovery date: 23 November 2000

Designations
- Designation: Jupiter XXIV
- Pronunciation: /aɪoʊˈkæstiː/
- Named after: Ιοκάστη Iokástē or Jocasta
- Alternative names: S/2000 J 3
- Adjectives: Iocastean /ˌaɪoʊkæˈstiːən/

Orbital characteristics
- Epoch 17 December 2020 (JD 2459200.5)
- Observation arc: 24 years 2024-12-03 (last obs)
- Semi-major axis: 0.1432617 AU (21,431,650 km)
- Eccentricity: 0.3294908
- Orbital period (sidereal): –640.97 d
- Mean anomaly: 289.50565°
- Mean motion: 0° 33^{m} 41.927^{s} / day
- Inclination: 149.42446° (to ecliptic)
- Longitude of ascending node: 343.53045°
- Argument of perihelion: 110.27239°
- Satellite of: Jupiter
- Group: Ananke group

Physical characteristics
- Mean diameter: 5 km
- Albedo: 0.04 (assumed)
- Spectral type: C
- Apparent magnitude: 21,8
- Absolute magnitude (H): 15,5

Iocaste, also known as Jupiter XXIV, and previously as S/2000 J 3, is a small natural satellite or moon of Jupiter. It is one of Jupiter's many irregular moons, which orbit far from the planet on highly inclined and eccentric orbits. Iocaste was discovered by Scott S. Sheppard on 23 November 2000 and was named after Jocasta.

It orbits Jupiter in the retrograde direction—opposite to the direction of the planet's rotation—at an average distance of 21.0 million km (13.0 million mi). Iocaste shares similar orbital properties as Jupiter's larger irregular moon Ananke, which makes it a member of the Ananke group. The moons of the Ananke group are believed to be fragments of an asteroid or trans-Neptunian object that was gravitationally captured by Jupiter and destroyed by a collision several billion years ago. Most of Iocaste's physical properties are unknown, it is estimated to be about 5 km in diameter and its surface is probably dark and gray in color.

== Discovery and naming ==
Iocaste was discovered in November 2000, along with ten other Jovian moons by a team of astronomers from the University of Hawaiʻi led by Scott S. Sheppard and given the temporary designation S/2000 J 3.

It was named in October 2002 after Jocasta, the mother/wife of Oedipus in Greek mythology. The name ending in "e" was chosen in accordance with the International Astronomical Union's policy for designating outer moons with retrograde orbits.

== Orbit ==
The satellite orbits Jupiter at a mean distance of 21.431.650 km and completes one orbit in 640,97 days. Its orbit has an inclination of 149° relative to the ecliptic and an eccentricity of 0.329. The orbit is subject to continuous changes due to gravitational perturbation from the Sun and the other planets.

=== Group membership and origin ===
Iocaste belongs to the Ananke group, a group of irregular retrograde Jovian moons. Members of this group orbit Jupiter at distances of approximately 19 to 22 million km, with orbital inclinations ranging from 144° to 156° and eccentricities between 0.10 and 0.30. The moons of the Ananke group are believed to be fragments of an asteroid or trans-Neptunian object that was gravitationally captured by Jupiter and destroyed by a collision several billion years ago.

== Physical characteristics ==
Due to its small size, Iocaste appears very faint from Earth with a visual apparent magnitude of around 21,8, so it can only be observed by very large, sensitive telescopes. Assuming Iocaste has a low geometric albedo of 0.04 like other irregular moons, its diameter has been estimated to be 5 km. The shape of the moon is currently unknown. However, given its small size, it is likely to have an irregular shape, similar to other small irregular moons.

The satellite appears grey (color index B−V=0.63, R−V=0.36), similar to C-type asteroids.

== Exploration ==
Iocaste has not been imaged up close by a space probe. All Jupiter irregular moons including Iocaste are planned to be distant observation targets for the European Space Agency's Jupiter Icy Moons Explorer (Juice) mission, which will measure the Jupiter irregular moons' rotation periods and shapes by watching their brightness change over time.

== See also ==
- Moons of Jupiter
- Praxidike
