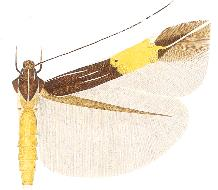

Scientific classification
- Kingdom: Animalia
- Phylum: Arthropoda
- Clade: Pancrustacea
- Class: Insecta
- Order: Lepidoptera
- Family: Cosmopterigidae
- Genus: Cosmopterix
- Species: C. harpalyke

Binomial name
- Cosmopterix harpalyke Koster, 2010

= Cosmopterix harpalyke =

Species of moth

Cosmopterix harpalyke is a moth of the family Cosmopterigidae. It is known from the Federal District of Brazil.

Adults have been recorded in March and November.

== Description ==
Male, female. Forewing length 3.5–4 mm. Head: frons shining white with greenish and reddish reflections, vertex and neck tufts brown with reddish gloss, medially and laterally lined white, collar brown; labial palpus first segment very short, white, second segment four-fifths of the length of third, brown with white longitudinal lines laterally and ventrally, third segment white, laterally with brown lines; scape dark brown with a white anterior line and a yellowish white dorsal line, white ventrally, antenna shining dark brown, a white line from base to beyond one-half, followed towards apex by an indistinct annulate section of approximately eight segments, three dark brown, three white, two dark brown, two white, ten dark brown and eight white segments at apex. Thorax and tegulae brown with reddish gloss, thorax with a white median line, tegulae lined white inwardly. Legs: dark greyish brown, femora of midleg and hindleg shining pale ochreous, foreleg with a white line on tibia and tarsal segments one to three and five, tibia of midleg with white oblique basal and medial lines and a white apical ring, tarsal segments one and two with white lateral lines from base on outside and connected to a dorsal white spot apically, segment three with a white line on the outside to beyond one half, segment five white dorsally, tibia of hindleg as midleg, tarsal segment one with white basal and apical rings, segment two with a white apical ring, segments three to five white dorsally, spurs white, ventrally ochreous-grey. Forewing brown with reddish gloss, five white lines in the basal area, narrower in female, a broad costal from one-third to the transverse fascia, a subcostal from base to one-third, slightly bending from costa, a short and straight medial above fold from one-quarter to two-fifths, a little longer subdorsal below fold, slightly further from base than the medial, a dorsal from or beyond base to the middle of the subdorsal, a broad yellow transverse fascia beyond the middle with a small apical protrusion, in female smaller as in male, bordered at the inner edge by two pale golden metallic tubercular subcostal and subdorsal spots, the subcostal spot outwardly edged by a small patch of blackish brown scales, the subdorsal spot slightly further from base and a little larger, bordered at the outer edge by two similarly coloured costal and dorsal spots, the dorsal spot three times as large as the costal, a white costal streak from outer costal spot, a shining white apical line connected to the apical protrusion, narrower and interrupted in the female, cilia brown around apex, brownish ochreous towards dorsum. Hindwing shining dark brownish grey, cilia brownish ochreous. Underside: forewing shining greyish brown, the white costal streak and apical line distinctly visible, hindwing shining brownish grey. Abdomen dorsally brownish yellow, ventrally grey, in the middle shining white, segments banded shining white posteriorly, anal tuft yellowish white, the female abdomen is dorsally greyish brown, mixed orange, segments banded greyish brown posteriorly, ventrally shining white, segment six greyish brown, anal tuft dorsally grey, ventrally whitish.

== Etymology ==
The species is named after Harpalyke, a moon of Jupiter. To be treated as a noun in apposition.
