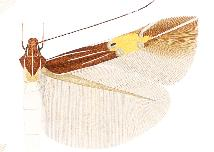

Scientific classification
- Kingdom: Animalia
- Phylum: Arthropoda
- Clade: Pancrustacea
- Class: Insecta
- Order: Lepidoptera
- Family: Cosmopterigidae
- Genus: Cosmopterix
- Species: C. euanthe

Binomial name
- Cosmopterix euanthe Koster, 2010

= Cosmopterix euanthe =

Species of moth

Cosmopterix euanthe is a moth of the family Cosmopterigidae. It is known from the Federal District of Brazil.

Adults have been collected in September and December.

== Description ==
Male, female. Forewing length 3.1-3.6 mm. Head: frons shining pale ochreous-grey with greenish reflection, vertex and neck tufts shining bronze brown with reddish reflection, laterally and medially lined white, collar shining bronze brown; labial palpus first segment very short, white, second segment four-fifths of the length of third, shining dark brown with white longitudinal lines laterally and ventrally, third segment white, lined dark brown laterally; scape dark brown with white anterior and dorsal lines, antenna dark brown with a white line from base to two-thirds, white line sometimes interrupted in middle and distally, followed towards apex by two white segments, two dark brown, two white, ten dark brown and seven white segments at apex. Thorax and tegulae shining bronze brown with reddish gloss, thorax with a white median line, tegulae lined white inwardly. Legs: shining dark greyish brown, femora pale ochreous-grey, foreleg with a white line on tibia and tarsal segments, in the male interrupted between the third and fourth segments, tibia of midleg with white oblique basal and medial lines and a white apical ring, tarsal segments one and two with white apical rings, segment five entirely white, tibia of hindleg as midleg, tarsal segment one with ochreous-white subbasal and apical rings, segments two to four with ochreous-white apical rings, segment five entirely ochreous-white, spurs white dorsally, dark brownish grey ventrally. Forewing shining bronze brown with reddish gloss, more greyish brown in apical area, five narrow white lines in the basal area, a costal from one-third to the transverse fascia, a subcostal from base to one-third, slightly bending from costa, a medial from one-sixth to the transverse fascia, a subdorsal from one-quarter almost to the transverse fascia and directed towards the end of the medial, a dorsal from beyond base to one-third, a pale yellow transverse fascia beyond the middle and with a short apical protrusion, in the male this apical protrusion is larger, bordered at the inner edge by two tubercular silver metallic subcostal and a subdorsal spots, the subdorsal spot slightly further from base than the subcostal and the subcostal spot outwardly with a small patch of blackish scales, bordered at the outer edge by two tubercular silver metallic costal and dorsal spots, the dorsal spot about three times as large as the costal, the costal spot slightly further from base and with some bronze brown inward lining, the transverse fascia narrowly edged greyish brown at costa, a white costal streak from the outer costal spot, a white apical line from the apical protrusion to apex, cilia greyish brown, paler towards dorsum. Hindwing shining pale grey, cilia greyish brown. Underside: forewing shining greyish brown, white costal streak distinctly visible, hindwing shining greyish brown. Abdomen dorsally ochreous-yellow, segments one and seven banded greyish brown laterally and posteriorly, ventrally greyish brown, segments broadly banded shining white posteriorly, in middle completely shining white, segment six entirely dark grey, anal tuft grey.

== Etymology ==
The species is named after Euanthe, a moon of Jupiter. To be treated as a noun in apposition.
