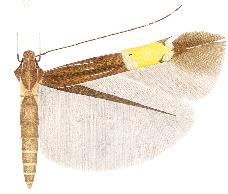

Scientific classification
- Kingdom: Animalia
- Phylum: Arthropoda
- Clade: Pancrustacea
- Class: Insecta
- Order: Lepidoptera
- Family: Cosmopterigidae
- Genus: Cosmopterix
- Species: C. thyone

Binomial name
- Cosmopterix thyone Koster, 2010

= Cosmopterix thyone =

Species of moth

Cosmopterix thyone is a moth of the family Cosmopterigidae. It is known from Minas Gerais, Brazil.

Adults have been recorded in October.

== Description ==
Male. Forewing length 3.6 mm. Head: frons shining silvery-white with greenish and reddish reflections, vertex and neck tufts bronze brown with reddish gloss, laterally and medially narrowly lined white, collar bronze brown; labial palpus first segment very short, white, second segment four-fifths of the length of third, brown with white longitudinal lines laterally and ventrally, third segment white, lined brown laterally; scape dorsally dark brown with a white anterior line, white ventrally, antenna shining dark brown with a white line from base to two-thirds, sometimes interrupted, followed towards apex by two white segments, two dark brown, two white, ten dark brown, four white and five dark brown segments at apex. Thorax and tegulae bronze brown with reddish gloss, thorax with a white median line, tegulae lined white inwardly. Legs: greyish brown with reddish gloss, femora of midleg and hindleg shining pale ochreous, foreleg with a white line on tibia and tarsal segments one to three and five, tibia of midleg with white oblique basal and medial lines and a white apical ring, tarsal segments one and two with white apical rings, segment five entirely white, tibia of hindleg as midleg but with an additional ochreous subapical ring, tarsal segments one and two with white apical rings, other tarsal segments missing, outer spurs whitish, inner spurs greyish brown, apically paler. Forewing bronze brown with reddish gloss, five white lines in the basal area, a costal from one-third to the transverse fascia, a subcostal from base to one-third, bending from costa distally, a short and straight medial above fold from one-quarter to the end of the subcostal, a subdorsal, twice as long as the medial, below fold and from about one-quarter to two-fifths, a narrow dorsal from one-eighth to start of the subdorsal, a broad yellow transverse fascia beyond the middle, bordered at the inner edge by a silver metallic fascia, almost perpendicular on dorsum, narrowing towards costa and not reaching it, subcostally on the outside with a short blackish-brown streak, bordered at the outer edge by two silver metallic costal and dorsal spots, both spots inwardly lined brown, the dorsal spot twice as large as the costal and slightly more towards base, both fascia and spots have some greenish reflection, a white costal streak from the costal spot, a narrow shining white, more or less interrupted, apical line from the distal half of the apical area, widening in the apical cilia, cilia bronze brown around apex, brownish grey towards dorsum. Hindwing shining dark brownish grey, cilia brownish grey. Underside: forewing shining pale greyish brown, the white apical line only visible in the apical cilia, hindwing greyish brown. Abdomen dorsally brown, segments four to six paler banded posteriorly, ventrally dark greyish brown with a broad white longitudinal streak in middle, segments broad shining white banded posteriorly, anal tuft ochreous-grey.

== Etymology ==
The species is named after Thyone, a moon of Jupiter. To be treated as a noun in apposition.
