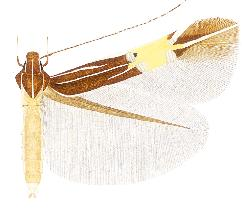

Scientific classification
- Kingdom: Animalia
- Phylum: Arthropoda
- Clade: Pancrustacea
- Class: Insecta
- Order: Lepidoptera
- Family: Cosmopterigidae
- Genus: Cosmopterix
- Species: C. praxidike

Binomial name
- Cosmopterix praxidike Koster, 2010

= Cosmopterix praxidike =

Species of moth

Cosmopterix praxidike is a moth of the family Cosmopterigidae. It is known from Tamaulipas, Mexico.

Adults have been recorded in August.

== Description ==
Male. Forewing length 3.9-4.2 mm. Head: frons shining pale ochreous-grey with greenish and reddish reflections, vertex and neck tufts dark bronze brown, laterally and medially lined white, collar dark bronze brown; labial palpus first segment very short, white, second segment four-fifths of the length of third, dark bronze brown with white longitudinal lines on outside and ventrally, inner side white, third segment white, lined brown laterally; scape dorsally dark brown with a white anterior line, ventrally shining white, antenna shining dark brown, a white line from base to approximately one half, followed by an interrupted section to two-thirds, followed towards apex by two dark brown segments, two white, two dark brown, two white, six dark brown and eight white segments at apex. Thorax and tegulae dark bronze brown, thorax with a white median line, tegulae lined white inwardly. Legs: dark brownish grey, femora of midleg and hindleg shining ochreous-white, lined greyish, foreleg with a white line on tibia and tarsal segments, segment five entirely white, tibia of midleg with white oblique basal and medial lines and a white apical ring, tarsal segments with white apical rings, segment five entirely white, tibia of hindleg as midleg, but with an additional white spot dorsally before the white apical ring, tarsal segment one with a white basal streak and a white dorsal streak from one-half, this white dorsal streak continues over the remaining segments, spurs white with a longitudinal dark grey streak ventrally. Forewing dark bronze brown, five white lines in the basal area, a broad costal from one-quarter to the transverse fascia, a subcostal from base to one-third, bending from costa in distal half, a medial almost from base to the transverse fascia, a subdorsal from one-third to the transverse fascia, a dorsal from base to one-third, a broad pale yellow transverse fascia beyond the middle with small basal and apical protrusions, bordered on the inner edge by two silver metallic tubercular subcostal and subdorsal spots of similar size, the subcostal spot with a patch of blackish scales on the outside, the subdorsal spot further from base than the subcostal, bordered on the outer edge by two similarly coloured costal and a dorsal spots, the dorsal spot more than twice as large as the costal and more towards the base, a white costal streak from the outer costal spot, a broad shining white apical line connected to the apical protrusion, cilia ochreous-grey, darker around the apex. Hindwing shining brownish grey, cilia pale ochreous-grey. Underside: forewing shining dark greyish brown with an ochreous-white line on costa from one-third, the apical line distinctly visible; hindwing shining pale brownish grey and with an ochreous-white line at apex. Abdomen dorsally pale ochreous-yellow, ventrally shining white, anal tuft white.

== Etymology ==
The species is named after Praxidike, a moon of Jupiter. To be treated as a noun in apposition.
