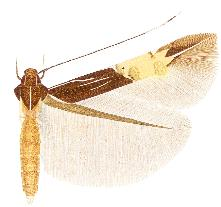

Scientific classification
- Kingdom: Animalia
- Phylum: Arthropoda
- Clade: Pancrustacea
- Class: Insecta
- Order: Lepidoptera
- Family: Cosmopterigidae
- Genus: Cosmopterix
- Species: C. euporie

Binomial name
- Cosmopterix euporie Koster, 2010

= Cosmopterix euporie =

Species of moth

Cosmopterix euporie is a moth of the family Cosmopterigidae. It is known from the Federal District of Brazil.

Adults were collected in August and September.

== Description ==
Male, female. Forewing length 3.9 mm. Head: broader and shorter than usual in the genus Cosmopterix, frons shining ochreous-white with greenish reflection, vertex and neck tufts brown, narrowly lined white laterally, collar brown; labial palpus first segment very short, white, second segment three-quarters of the length of third, brown with white longitudinal lines laterally and ventrally, third segment white, lined brown laterally; scape dark brown with a white anterior line, white ventrally, antenna shining dark brown, a white line from base to two-thirds, followed towards apex by eight white segments, in the female this white subapical section is divided into several narrow white rings, one grey, two white, approximately five dark brown and six white segments at apex. Thorax and tegulae brown, thorax with white median line, which is reduced to a posterior white spot in the female. Legs: greyish brown, femora of midleg and hindleg shining pale ochreous-grey, foreleg with a white line on tibia and tarsal segments, interrupted in the apical half of third and the basal half of fourth segment, tibia of midleg with white oblique basal and medial lines and a white apical ring, tarsal segments one, two and four with white apical rings, tarsal segment five entirely white, tibia of hindleg with a white line from base to mid-spurs, from there as a very oblique line to the dorsal side of the tibia, a broad creamy white oblique subapical streak and a white apical ring, tarsal segment one with white basal and apical rings, segments two to four with white dorsal spots apically, segment five white, spurs yellowish white, ventrally with a greyish-brown streak. Forewing brown, five narrow white lines in the basal area, a short costal from one-third to the transverse fascia, a subcostal from base to one-third, bending rather abruptly from costa in distal half, a straight medial above fold from one-fifth to two-fifths, a subdorsal below fold, from one-quarter to the end of the medial, a short and broad dorsal at base, the costal and dorsal lines are less prominent in the female, a broad pale yellow transverse fascia beyond the middle, more pinkish yellow in the female, and with a narrowing prolongation towards apex, bordered at the inner edge by two pale greyish golden metallic tubercular costal and dorsal spots, the costal spot about half the size of the dorsal and outwardly edged by a small patch of blackish brown scales and inwardly by a white streak connecting to the white costal line, the dorsal spot much further from base than the costal, bordered at the outer edge with a similar coloured costal and dorsal spot, both spots opposite, the dorsal spot more than five times as large as the costal, the costal spot brownish edged on the inside, a white costal streak from outer costal spot, a shining white apical line, not completely reaching the apex, cilia greyish brown around apex, ochreous-grey towards dorsum. Hindwing shining brownish grey, cilia ochreous-grey. Underside: forewing shining brown with a yellowish white costal line from two-thirds to four-fifths, the white apical line distinctly visible, hindwing shining grey, costal half darker. Abdomen dorsally yellowish brown with reddish gloss, ventrally grey, segments broad banded shining white posteriorly and with a yellowish white longitudinal line, anal tuft yellowish white.

== Etymology ==
The species is named after Euporie, a moon of Jupiter. To be treated as a noun in apposition.
