= Harpalyce (daughter of Clymenus) =

Princess in Greek mythology

In Greek mythology, Harpalyce (/hɑːrˈpæləsiː/; Ancient Greek: Ἁρπαλύκη, romanized: Harpalúkē) is a Peloponnesian princess from either Argos or Arcadia, daughter of King Clymenus. Clymenus desired and raped Harpalyce, who then avenged herself by making him unwittingly feast on his own blood. Her tale shares elements with that of Tereus and Procne.

== Family ==
Harpalyce was the daughter of Clymenus, by a woman named Epicasta; she also had two brothers, Idas and Therager. She became the mother of an unnamed son.

== Mythology ==
In one version of the tale, set in Arcadia, Harpalyce was desired by her incestuous father Clymenus, who ended up raping her. As a result, Harpalyce conceived and gave birth to a son. She took revenge against her impious father by killing her son, and then secretly feeding him to Clymenus during a banquet. When Clymenus found out the truth, he killed Harpalyce.

In another version, set in Argos, Harpalyce was betrothed to Alastor, but nevertheless her father Clymenus delevoped an ardent passion for her. For some time he managed to restrain himself, but in the end he employed a slave nurse to inform Harpalyce, and the two embarked on a secret affair. Alastor however came to finally wed her and took her away, with Clymenus’ consent. But Clymenus then hurried after them, halted them, seized Harpalyce and returned with her to Argos, where he openly lived with her as his wife.

Harpalyce resented the cruel and vicious treatment she was receiving from Clymenus, so during a festival she cut down her younger brother, who was called Presbon, and served him to Clymenus during the banquet. She then prayed to the gods to be taken away from mankind, and the gods answered by transforming her into a chalkis bird (a type of owl).

== In culture ==
Jupiter's irregular moon Harpalyke (also known as Jupiter XXII) was named after this mythological figure.

== See also ==
Other mythological women who killed brothers or sons include:

- Medea
- Procne
- Cassiphone
- Alphesiboea of Psophis

== Bibliography ==
- Bell, Robert E. (1991). Women of Classical Mythology: A Biographical Dictionary. ABC-Clio. ISBN 9780874365818.
- Euphorion of Chalcis, Fragments in Hellenistic Collection: Philitas. Alexander of Aetolia. Hermesianax. Euphorion. Parthenius. Edited and translated by J. L. Lightfoot. Loeb Classical Library 508. Cambridge, MA: Harvard University Press, 2010.
- Grimal, Pierre (1987). The Dictionary of Classical Mythology. Wiley-Blackwell. ISBN 0-631-13209-0.
- Hyginus, Fabulae from The Myths of Hyginus translated and edited by Mary Grant. University of Kansas Publications in Humanistic Studies. Online version at the Topos Text Project.
- Nonnus of Panopolis, Dionysiaca translated by William Henry Denham Rouse (1863-1950), Volume I, from the Loeb Classical Library No 244, Cambridge, MA, Harvard University Press, 1940. Online version at Internet Archive.
- Parthenius, Love Romances translated by Sir Stephen Gaselee (1882-1943), S. Loeb Classical Library Volume 69. Cambridge, MA. Harvard University Press. 1916. Online version at the Topos Text Project.
- Stiebert, Johanna (October 20, 2016). First-Degree Incest and the Hebrew Bible: Sex in the Family. Bloomsbury Publishing. ISBN 978-0-5676-0033-2.
