= Jupiter LXX =

Outer moon of Jupiter

- S/2017 J 9 imaged by the Cerro Tololo Observatory's Dark Energy Camera on 26 March 2017

Discovery
- Discovered by: Scott S. Sheppard et al.
- Discovery date: 2017

Designations
- Designation: Jupiter LXX
- Alternative names: S/2017 J 9

Orbital characteristics
- Observation arc: 5 years 2022-10-16 (last obs)
- Semi-major axis: 21487000 km
- Eccentricity: 0.229
- Orbital period (sidereal): −639.2 days
- Mean anomaly: 259.5°
- Inclination: 152.7°
- Longitude of ascending node: 306.4°
- Argument of perihelion: 317.7°
- Satellite of: Jupiter
- Group: Ananke group

Physical characteristics
- Mean diameter: 3 km
- Apparent magnitude: 22.8
- Absolute magnitude (H): 16.11 (28 obs)

Jupiter LXX, originally known as S/2017 J 9, is an outer natural satellite of Jupiter. It was discovered by Scott S. Sheppard and his team in 2017, but not announced until July 17, 2018, via a Minor Planet Electronic Circular from the Minor Planet Center. It is about 3 kilometers in diameter and orbits at a semi-major axis of about 21,487,000 km with an inclination of about 152.7°. It belongs to the Ananke group.
