= Jupiter LXVIII =

Outer moon of Jupiter

- Discovery images of Jupiter LXVIII from the Cerro Tololo Observatory's Dark Energy Camera on 23 March 2017

Discovery
- Discovered by: Scott Sheppard et al.
- Discovery date: 2017

Designations
- Designation: Jupiter LXVIII
- Alternative names: S/2017 J 7

Orbital characteristics
- Epoch 2026-01-01
- Observation arc: 1 year 2018-05-17 (last obs)
- Periapsis: 17.1 million km
- Apoapsis: 25.7 million km (2026-May-21)
- Semi-major axis: 20.2 million km
- Eccentricity: 0.193
- Orbital period (sidereal): −632.3 days
- Mean anomaly: 82°
- Inclination: 144.6°
- Longitude of ascending node: 347°
- Argument of perihelion: 336°
- Satellite of: Jupiter
- Group: Ananke group

Physical characteristics
- Mean diameter: 2 km
- Apparent magnitude: 23.6
- Absolute magnitude (H): 16.6 (18 obs)

Jupiter LXVIII, provisionally known as S/2017 J 7, is an outer natural satellite of Jupiter. It was discovered by Scott S. Sheppard and his team in 2017, but not announced until July 17, 2018, via a Minor Planet Electronic Circular from the Minor Planet Center. It is about 2 kilometers in diameter and orbits at a semi-major axis of about 20.2 million km with an inclination of about 144.6°. It belongs to the Ananke group.

It only has a 1 1/4 year observation arc with 18 observations. It will next come to apojove (farthest distance from Jupiter) on 21 May 2026 when it will be 0.166 AU (24.8 million km; 15.4 million mi) from Jupiter.
