= Ananke group =

Group of retrograde irregular satellites of Jupiter

This diagram compares the orbital elements and relative sizes of the known members of the Ananke group as of April 2026. The horizontal axis illustrates their average distance from Jupiter, the vertical axis their orbital inclination, and the circles their relative sizes.

107 irregular moons of Jupiter plotted by semi-major axis and inclination as of April 2026. The Ananke group is shown as a tight cluster of yellow-colored points on the left.

The Ananke group (or family or cluster) is a group of retrograde irregular satellites of Jupiter that follow similar orbits to Ananke and are thought to have a common origin. They are inferred to be collisional fragments leftover from a single break-up shortly after the planet formation period.

Their semi-major axes (distances from Jupiter) range between 19.2 and 21.8 million km, their orbital inclinations between 144.3° and 155.5°, and their orbital eccentricities between 0.09 and 0.30.

The International Astronomical Union (IAU) reserves names ending in -e for all retrograde moons of Jupiter, including the members in this group.

== Origin ==
The Ananke group is believed to have been formed when an asteroid was captured by Jupiter and subsequently fragmented by a collision. This belief is founded on the fact that the dispersion of the mean orbital parameters (Note: Osculating orbital parameters of irregular satellites of Jupiter change widely in short intervals due to heavy perturbation by the Sun. For example, changes of as much as 1 million km in semi-major axis in 2 years, 0.5 in eccentricity in 12 years, and as much as 5° in inclination in 24 years have been reported. Mean orbital elements are the averages calculated by the numerical integration of current elements over a long period of time, used to determine the dynamical families.) of the core members is very small and can be accounted for by a small velocity impulse (15 < δV < 80 m/s), compatible with a single collision and breakup.

Based on the sizes of the satellites, the original asteroid may have been about 28 km in diameter. Since this value is near the approximate diameter of Ananke itself, it is likely the parent body was not heavily disrupted.

Available photometric studies put this in doubt, however, and suggest that secular resonance has mixed the Ananke and Pasiphae groups: three of the moons of the former family (Harpalyke, Praxidike and Iocaste) display similar grey colours (average colour indices: B−V = 0.77 and V−R = 0.42) while Ananke itself is on the boundary between grey and light red.

The formation of the Ananke group was likely via a collision with a passing planetesimal, as opposed to a moon-moon impact. Due to their longer orbital periods and greater distances from Jupiter, collisions are rare among the retrograde satellites. Numerical integrations show the expected number of collisions in the past 4.5 billion years among all retrograde moons combined is around 1, which is probably not common enough to have produced the families. The impactor of the parent object produced a large crater, but was not large enough to catastrophically disrupt the progenitor, as the largest fragment still has 96% of the mass of the parent body. The impactor's diameter is required to be 0.53 km; planetesimals of that size were very common early in the Solar System's formation. However, a moon-moon collisional origin is still plausible if the number of retrograde irregular moons around Jupiter was much more numerous in the past. The Carme group is inferred to have a similar formation.

== Classification ==
The Ananke group is typically simply visually identified in orbital element space, differing in inclination from the Carme group and having smaller semi-major axes than the Pasiphae group. However, some authors only consider the tight cluster immediately surrounding Ananke to be part of its group. At other times, there is no distinction made between the Ananke and Pasiphae groups, and the two may be considered a single group.

== List ==
The members of the Ananke group are (in order of date announcement):

Name	Diameter (km)	Semi-Major Axis (km)	Period (days) (Note: Negative period is indicative of retrograde motion.)	Notes
Ananke	29,1	21029500	–623.11	largest member and group prototype
Iocaste	5	21062300	–624.55	grey colour
Harpalyke	4	20887500	–616.78	grey colour
Praxidike	7	20931100	–618.72	grey colour
Thyone	4	20972700	–620.59	
Hermippe	4	21103600	–626.38	
Euanthe	3	20822900	–613.93	
Orthosie	2	20897800	–617.23	
Euporie	2	19261900	–546.18	
Jupiter LXXIII	2	20992900	–621.47	
Eupheme	2	20763400	–611.32	
Helike	4	20911400	–617.86	
S/2003 J 12	1	20959300	–619.96	
S/2003 J 16	2	20877500	–622.88	
Jupiter LV	2	20332800	–592.33	
Mneme	2	20815800	–613.61	
Thelxinoe	2	20972300	–620.55	
Jupiter LII	1	20786900	–612.35	
Jupiter LIV	1	20796700	–612.78	
Jupiter LXIV	2	20936500	–618.97	
Jupiter LXVIII	2	20960400	–620.02	
Jupiter LXX	3	21764200	–656.05	
S/2021 J 1	1	20954700	–619.77	
S/2021 J 2	1	20926600	–618.50	
S/2021 J 3	2	20776600	–611.87	
S/2022 J 3	1	21015100	–622.44	
S/2017 J 10	2	21075800	–625.15	
S/2010 J 6	2	21489800	–643.67	
S/2021 J 8	1	20978900	–620.85	
