= Harpalyke (moon) =

Retrograde irregular satellite of Jupiter

- Harpalyke imaged by the Canada-France-Hawaii Telescope in December 2001

Discovery
- Discovered by: Scott S. Sheppard; David C. Jewitt; Yanga R. Fernandez; Eugene A. Magnier
- Discovery site: Mauna Kea Observatory
- Discovery date: 23 November 2000

Designations
- Designation: Jupiter XXII
- Pronunciation: /hɑːrˈpæləkiː/
- Named after: Ἁρπαλύκη Harpălykē
- Alternative names: S/2000 J 5
- Adjectives: Harpalykean /hɑːrpələˈkiːən/

Orbital characteristics
- Epoch 17 December 2020 (JD 2459200.5)
- Observation arc: 24 years 2024-12-02 (last obs)
- Semi-major axis: 0.1422492 AU (21,280,180 km)
- Eccentricity: 0.1602677
- Orbital period (sidereal): –634.19 d
- Mean anomaly: 321.08380°
- Mean motion: 0° 34^{m} 3.555^{s} / day
- Inclination: 148.29788° (to ecliptic)
- Longitude of ascending node: 92.54746°
- Argument of perihelion: 193.28018°
- Satellite of: Jupiter
- Group: Ananke group

Physical characteristics
- Mean diameter: 4 km
- Albedo: 0.04 (assumed)
- Spectral type: C
- Apparent magnitude: 22.2
- Absolute magnitude (H): 15.9

Harpalyke /hɑːrˈpæləkiː/, also known as Jupiter XXII and previously as S/2000 J 5, is a small natural satellite or moon of Jupiter. It is one of Jupiter's many irregular moons, which orbit far from the planet on highly inclined and eccentric orbits. Harpalyke was discovered by Scott S. Sheppard on 23 November 2000 and was named after Harpalyce, daughter of Clymenus.

It orbits Jupiter in the retrograde direction—opposite to the direction of the planet's rotation—at an average distance of 21.0 million km (13.0 million mi). Harpalyke shares similar orbital properties as Jupiter's larger irregular moon Ananke, which makes it a member of the Ananke group. The moons of the Ananke group are believed to be fragments of an asteroid or trans-Neptunian object that was gravitationally captured by Jupiter and destroyed by a collision several billion years ago. Most of Harpalyke 's physical properties are unknown, it estimated to be about 4 km in diameter and its surface is be probably dark and gray in color.

== Discovery and Naming ==
Harpalyke was discovered in November 2000, along with ten other Jovian moons by a team of astronomers from the University of Hawaiʻi led by Scott S. Sheppard and given the temporary designation S/2000 J 5.

In October 2002, the moon was named after Harpalyce, the incestuous daughter of Clymenus, who in some accounts was also a lover of Zeus (Jupiter).

== Orbit ==
The satellite orbits Jupiter at a mean distance of 21,280,180 km and completes one orbit in 634.19 days. Its orbit has an inclination of 148° relative to the ecliptic and an eccentricity of 0.160. The orbit is subject to continuous changes due to gravitational perturbation from the Sun and the other planets.

=== Group membership and origin ===
Harpalyke belongs to the Ananke group, a group of irregular retrograde Jovian moons. Members of this group orbit Jupiter at distances of approximately 19 to 22 million km, with orbital inclinations ranging from 144° to 156° and eccentricities between 0.10 and 0.30. The moons of the Ananke group are believed to be fragments of an asteroid or trans-Neptunian object that was gravitationally captured by Jupiter and destroyed by a collision several billion years ago.

== Physical characteristics ==
Due to its small size, Harpalyke appears very faint from Earth with a visual apparent magnitude of around 22,2, so it can only be observed by very large, sensitive telescopes. Assuming Harpalyke has a low geometric albedo of 0.04 like other irregular moons, 's diameter has been estimated to be 4 km. The shape of the moon is currently unknown. However, given its small size, it is likely to have an irregular shape, similar to other small irregular moons.

The satellite appears grey (color index R-V=0.43), similar to C-type asteroids.

== Exploration ==
Harpalyke has not been imaged up close by a space probe. All Jupiter irregular moons including Harpalyke are planned to be distant observation targets for the European Space Agency's Jupiter Icy Moons Explorer (Juice) mission, which will measure the Jupiter irregular moons' rotation periods and shapes by watching their brightness change over time.
