= S/2003 J 16 =

Moon of Jupiter

- Recovery images of S/2003 J 16 taken by the Canada-France-Hawaii Telescope in September 2010

Discovery
- Discovered by: Brett J. Gladman; JJ Kavelaars; Jean-Marc Petit; Lynne Allen
- Discovery site: Mauna Kea Obs.
- Discovery date: 6 February 2003

Orbital characteristics
- Epoch 17 December 2020 (JD 2459200.5)
- Observation arc: 22 years 2025-12-23 (last obs)
- Semi-major axis: 0.1371176 AU (20,512,500 km)
- Eccentricity: 0.3330999
- Orbital period (sidereal): –1.64 yr (–600.18 d)
- Mean anomaly: 88.24314°
- Mean motion: 0° 35^{m} 59.341^{s} / day
- Inclination: 151.16323° (to ecliptic); 28.83677° (retrograde)
- Longitude of ascending node: 83.26365°
- Argument of perihelion: 86.51495°
- Satellite of: Jupiter
- Group: Ananke group

Physical characteristics
- Mean diameter: ≈2 km
- Albedo: 0.04 (assumed)
- Apparent magnitude: 23.3
- Absolute magnitude (H): 16.33 (59 obs)

S/2003 J 16 is a natural satellite of Jupiter. It was discovered by a team of astronomers led by Brett J. Gladman in 2003.

S/2003 J 16 is about 2 kilometres in diameter, and orbits Jupiter at an average distance of 0.137 AU (20.5 Gm) in 600 days, at an inclination of 151° to the ecliptic (149° to Jupiter's equator), in a retrograde direction and with an eccentricity of 0.333. It belongs to the Ananke group of retrograde irregular moons which orbit Jupiter between 19.3 and 22.7 million km, at inclinations of roughly 150°.

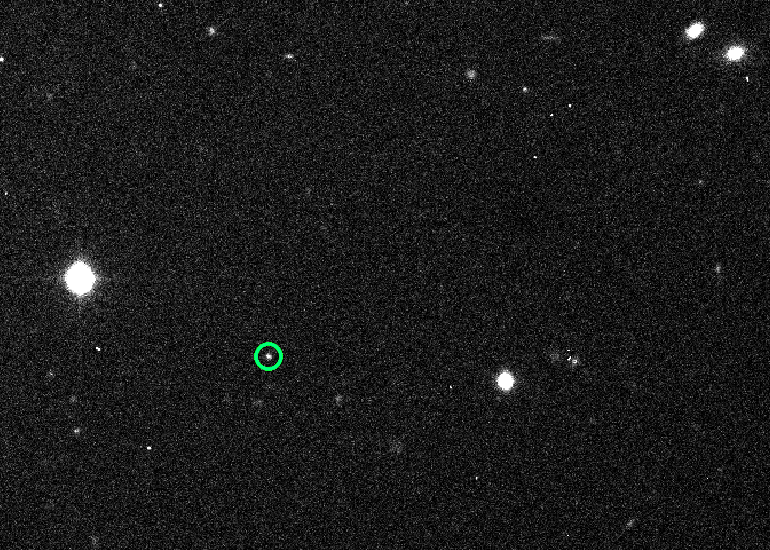
Recovery image of S/2003 J 16 on 8 September 2010 (circled)

This moon was once considered lost until September 2010, when it was recovered by Christian Veillet with Canada-France-Hawaii Telescope (CFHT). However, the recovery observations of S/2003 J 16 were not reported by the Minor Planet Center until 2020, when Ashton et al. independently identified the moon in the same CFHT images taken by Veillet back in September 2010. S/2003 J 16 was also identified in observations by Scott Sheppard from March 2017 to May 2018, cumulating a long observation arc of 5,574 days (15 years) since its discovery. The recovery of S/2003 J 16 was formally announced by the Minor Planet Center on 4 November 2020.
