= Helike (moon) =

Moon of Jupiter

- Images of Helike by the Canada-France-Hawaii Telescope in February 2003

Discovery
- Discovered by: Scott S. Sheppard et al.
- Discovery date: 2003

Designations
- Designation: Jupiter XLV
- Pronunciation: /ˈhɛləkiː/
- Named after: Ἑλίκη Helicē
- Alternative names: S/2003 J 6
- Adjectives: Helikean /hɛləˈkiːən/

Orbital characteristics
- Observation arc: 22 years 2025-12-21 (last obs)
- Semi-major axis: 21263000 km
- Eccentricity: 0.156
- Orbital period (sidereal): −634.8 days
- Mean anomaly: 36.2°
- Inclination: 154.8°
- Longitude of ascending node: 100.3°
- Argument of perihelion: 314.7°
- Satellite of: Jupiter
- Group: Ananke group

Physical characteristics
- Mean diameter: 4 km
- Apparent magnitude: 22.6
- Absolute magnitude (H): 15.85 (53 obs)

Helike /ˈhɛləkiː/, also known as Jupiter XLV, is a natural satellite of Jupiter. It was discovered by a team of astronomers from the University of Hawaiʻi led by Scott S. Sheppard in 2003, and given the temporary designation S/2003 J 6.

Helike is about 4 kilometres in diameter, and orbits Jupiter at an average distance of 20.54 million kilometres in 601.402 days, at an inclination of 155° to the ecliptic (156° to Jupiter's equator), in a retrograde direction and with an eccentricity of 0.1375. Its average orbital speed is 2.48 km/s.

It was named in March 2005 after Helike, one of the nymphs that nurtured Zeus (Jupiter) in his infancy on Crete.

Helike belongs to the Ananke group.
