= Jupiter LXIV =

Outer moon of Jupiter

- Precovery images of Jupiter LXIV from the Canada-France-Hawaii Telescope in December 2003

Discovery
- Discovered by: Scott S. Sheppard et al.
- Discovery date: 2017

Designations
- Designation: Jupiter LXIV
- Alternative names: S/2017 J 3

Orbital characteristics
- Observation arc: 8 years 2024-12-03 (last obs)
- Semi-major axis: 20694000 km
- Eccentricity: 0.148
- Orbital period (sidereal): −606.3 days
- Mean anomaly: 91.2°
- Inclination: 147.9°
- Longitude of ascending node: 82.5°
- Argument of periastron: 171.6°
- Satellite of: Jupiter
- Group: Ananke group

Physical characteristics
- Mean diameter: 2 km
- Apparent magnitude: 23.4
- Absolute magnitude (H): 16.67 (23 obs)

Jupiter LXIV, originally known as S/2017 J 3, is an outer natural satellite of Jupiter. It was discovered by Scott S. Sheppard and his team in 2017, but not announced until July 17, 2018 via a Minor Planet Electronic Circular from the Minor Planet Center. It is about 2 kilometers in diameter and orbits at a semi-major axis of about 20,694,000 km with an inclination of about 147.9°. It belongs to the Ananke group.
