= Euanthe (moon) =

Moon of Jupiter

- Discovery images of Euanthe by the Canada-France-Hawaii Telescope in December 2001

Discovery
- Discovered by: Scott S. Sheppard et al.
- Discovery site: Mauna Kea Obs.
- Discovery date: 11 December 2001

Designations
- Designation: Jupiter XXXIII
- Pronunciation: /juːˈænθiː/
- Named after: Ευάνθη Eyanthē
- Alternative names: S/2001 J 7
- Adjectives: Euanthean /juːænˈθiːən/

Orbital characteristics
- Observation arc: 23 years 2024-12-03 (last obs)
- Semi-major axis: 20799000 km
- Eccentricity: 0.232
- Orbital period (sidereal): −602.81 days
- Mean anomaly: 130.5°
- Inclination: 148.9°
- Longitude of ascending node: 271.0°
- Argument of perihelion: 316.0°
- Satellite of: Jupiter
- Group: Ananke group

Physical characteristics
- Mean diameter: 3 km
- Apparent magnitude: 22.8
- Absolute magnitude (H): 16.44 (28 obs)

Euanthe /juːˈænθi/, also known as Jupiter XXXIII, is a retrograde irregular satellite of Jupiter. It was discovered by a team of astronomers from the University of Hawaiʻi led by Scott S. Sheppard in 2001, and given the temporary designation S/2001 J 7.

Euanthe is about 3 kilometres in diameter, and orbits Jupiter at an average distance of 20,465 Mm in 602.81 days, at an inclination of 143° to the ecliptic (142° to Jupiter's equator) with an eccentricity of 0.2001.

It was named in August 2003 after Euanthe, who was the mother of the Graces, according to some Greek writers.

Euanthe belongs to the Ananke group, retrograde irregular moons that orbit Jupiter between 19.3 and 22.7 million km, at inclinations of roughly 150°.
