= Praxidike (moon) =

Moon of Jupiter

- Praxidike imaged by the Canada-France-Hawaii Telescope in December 2001

Discovery
- Discovered by: Scott S. Sheppard et al.
- Discovery site: Mauna Kea Observatory
- Discovery date: 23 November 2000

Designations
- Designation: Jupiter XXVII
- Pronunciation: /prækˈsɪdəkiː/
- Named after: Πραξιδίκη Praxidikē
- Alternative names: S/2000 J 7
- Adjectives: Praxidikean /ˌpræksədəˈkiːən/

Orbital characteristics
- Observation arc: 25 years 2025-12-21 (last obs)
- Semi-major axis: 21147000 km
- Eccentricity: 0.230
- Orbital period (sidereal): −609.25 days
- Mean anomaly: 21.8°
- Inclination: 149.0°
- Longitude of ascending node: 285.2°
- Argument of perihelion: 209.7°
- Satellite of: Jupiter
- Group: Ananke group

Physical characteristics
- Mean diameter: 7.0±0.7 km
- Albedo: 0.029±0.006
- Spectral type: C
- Apparent magnitude: 21,2
- Absolute magnitude (H): 14.8 (119 obs)

Praxidike /prækˈsɪdəkiː/, also known as Jupiter XXVII,and previously as S/2000 J 7, is a small natural satellite or moon of Jupiter. It is one of Jupiter's many irregular moons, which orbit far from the planet on highly inclined and eccentric orbits. Praxidike was discovered by Scott S. Sheppard on 23 November 2000 and was named after Praxidike.

It orbits Jupiter in the retrograde direction—opposite to the direction of the planet's rotation—at an average distance of 21.0 million km (13.0 million mi). Praxidike shares similar orbital properties as Jupiter's larger irregular moon Ananke, which makes it a member of the Ananke group. The moons of the Ananke group are believed to be fragments of an asteroid or trans-Neptunian object that was gravitationally captured by Jupiter and destroyed by a collision several billion years ago. Most of Praxidike's physical properties are unknown, it to be about 7 km in diameter and its surface is be dark and gray in color.

== Discovery and naming ==
Praxidike was discovered in November 2000, along with ten other Jovian moons by a team of astronomers from the University of Hawaiʻi led by Scott S. Sheppard and given the temporary designation S/2000 J 7.

In October 2002, the moon was named after Praxidike, the Greek goddess of punishment.

== Orbit ==
The satellite orbits Jupiter at a mean distance of 21,147,000 kmand completes one orbit in 609.25 days. Its orbit has an inclination of 149° relative to the ecliptic and an eccentricity of 0.230. The orbit is subject to continuous changes due to gravitational perturbation from the Sun and the other planets.

=== Group membership and origin ===
Praxidike belongs to the Ananke group, a group of irregular retrograde Jovian moons. Members of this group orbit Jupiter at distances of approximately 19 to 22 million km, with orbital inclinations ranging from 144° to 156° and eccentricities between 0.10 and 0.30. The moons of the Ananke group are believed to be fragments of an asteroid or trans-Neptunian object that was gravitationally captured by Jupiter and destroyed by a collision several billion years ago.

== Physical characteristics ==
Praxidike observed by the WISE spacecraft in 2010

Due to its small size, Praxidike appears very faint from Earth with a visual apparent magnitude of around 21,2, so it can only be observed by very large, sensitive telescopes. With a diameter of approximately 7 km, Praxidike is the second-largest member of the group after Ananke itself. Measurements of its thermal infrared emission by the WISE space telescope determined an albedo of only 2.9% for Praxidike. This makes the moon one of the darkest known bodies in the Solar System. The shape of the moon is currently unknown. However, given its small size, it is likely to have an irregular shape, similar to other small irregular moons.

The satellite appears grey (colour indices B−V=0.77, R–V= 0.34), typical of C-type asteroids.

== Exploration ==
Praxidike has not been imaged up close by a space probe. All Jupiter irregular moons including Praxidike are planned to be distant observation targets for the European Space Agency's Jupiter Icy Moons Explorer (Juice) mission, which will measure the Jupiter irregular moons' rotation periods and shapes by watching their brightness change over time.
