= Thyone (moon) =

Moon of Jupiter

- Discovery images of Thyone by the Canada-France-Hawaii Telescope in December 2001

Discovery
- Discovered by: Scott S. Sheppard et al.
- Discovery site: Mauna Kea Obs.
- Discovery date: 11 December 2001

Designations
- Designation: Jupiter XXIX
- Pronunciation: /θaɪˈoʊniː/
- Named after: Θυώνη Thyōnē
- Alternative names: S/2001 J 2
- Adjectives: Thyonean /ˌθaɪəˈniːən/

Orbital characteristics
- Observation arc: 24 years 2025-12-21 (last obs)
- Semi-major axis: 20940000 km
- Eccentricity: 0.229
- Orbital period (sidereal): −603.58 days
- Mean anomaly: 26.6°
- Inclination: 148.5°
- Longitude of ascending node: 243.0°
- Argument of perihelion: 89.1°
- Satellite of: Jupiter
- Group: Ananke group

Physical characteristics
- Mean diameter: 4 km
- Spectral type: B–V = 0.71 ± 0.06, V–R = 0.45 ± 0.04
- Apparent magnitude: 22.3
- Absolute magnitude (H): 15.78 (53 obs)

Thyone /θaɪˈoʊniː/, also known as Jupiter XXIX, is a retrograde irregular satellite of Jupiter. It was discovered by a team of astronomers from the University of Hawaiʻi led by Scott S. Sheppard in 2001, and given the temporary designation S/2001 J 2.

Thyone is about 4 kilometres in diameter, and orbits Jupiter at an average distance of 21,605,000 kilometres in 603.58 days, at an inclination of 147.28° to the ecliptic (146.93° to Jupiter's equator) with an eccentricity of 0.2526. Its average orbital speed is 2.43 km/s.

It was named in August 2003 after Thyone, better known as Semele, mother of Dionysus in Greek mythology.

Thyone belongs to the Ananke group, retrograde irregular moons which orbit Jupiter between 19.3 and 22.7 million kilometres, at inclinations of roughly 150°.

Thyone imaged by the CFHT on 10 December 2001, one day before its discovery
