= Euporie (moon) =

Outer moon of Jupiter

- Discovery images of Euporie by the Canada-France-Hawaii Telescope in December 2001

Discovery
- Discovered by: Scott S. Sheppard et al.
- Discovery site: Mauna Kea Obs.
- Discovery date: 11 December 2001

Designations
- Designation: Jupiter XXXIV
- Pronunciation: /ˈjuːpəriː/
- Named after: Ευπορία Eyporia
- Alternative names: S/2001 J 10
- Adjectives: Euporian /juːˈpɔːriən/

Orbital characteristics
- Observation arc: 24 years 2025-12-21 (last obs)
- Semi-major axis: 19302000 km
- Eccentricity: 0.144
- Orbital period (sidereal): −550.7 days
- Mean anomaly: 293.0°
- Inclination: 145.8°
- Longitude of ascending node: 64.9°
- Argument of perihelion: 74.6°
- Satellite of: Jupiter
- Group: Ananke group

Physical characteristics
- Mean diameter: 2 km
- Apparent magnitude: 23.1
- Absolute magnitude (H): 16.29 (42 obs)

Euporie /ˈjuːpəriː/, also known as Jupiter XXXIV, is a natural satellite of Jupiter. It was discovered by a team of astronomers from the University of Hawaiʻi led by Scott S. Sheppard in 2001, and given the temporary designation S/2001 J 10.

Euporie is about 2 kilometres in diameter, and orbits Jupiter at an average distance of 19.266 million km in 550.69 days, at an inclination of 145.7° to the ecliptic, in a retrograde direction and with an eccentricity of 0.148. It is affected by the Kozai mechanism.

It was named in August 2003 after Euporie, a Greek goddess of abundance and one of the Horae in Greek mythology (and thus a daughter of Zeus). It is a member of the Ananke group.
