= Ananke (moon) =

Moon of Jupiter

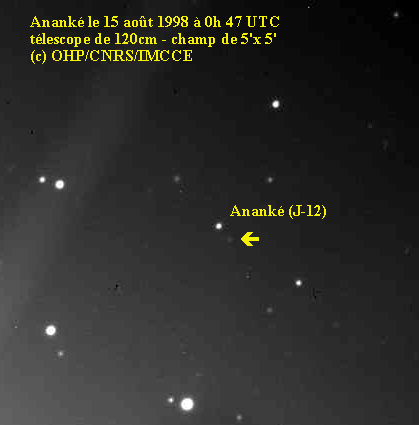
- Ananke photographed by the Haute-Provence Observatory in August 1998

Discovery
- Discovered by: Seth B. Nicholson
- Discovery site: Mt. Wilson Observatory
- Discovery date: 28 September 1951

Designations
- Designation: Jupiter XII
- Pronunciation: /əˈnæŋkiː/
- Named after: Ἀνάγκη Anagkē
- Adjectives: Anankean /ænəŋˈkiːən/

Orbital characteristics
- Epoch 17 December 2020 (JD 2459200.5)
- Observation arc: 69.05 yr (24,338 days)
- Semi-major axis: 0.1406602 AU (21,042,470 km)
- Eccentricity: 0.1747248
- Orbital period (sidereal): –623.59 d
- Mean anomaly: 339.61045°
- Mean motion: 0° 34^{m} 38.281^{s} / day
- Inclination: 148.67482° (to ecliptic)
- Longitude of ascending node: 86.44368°
- Argument of perihelion: 135.63033°
- Satellite of: Jupiter
- Group: Ananke group

Physical characteristics
- Mean diameter: 29.1±0.6 km
- Mass: 1.68×10^{16} kg (calculated)
- Mean density: 1.30 g/cm^{3} (assumed)
- Synodic rotation period: 8.31±0.15 h?
- Albedo: 0.038±0.006
- Spectral type: P
- Apparent magnitude: 18.9
- Absolute magnitude (H): 11.7

Ananke (/əˈnæŋki/), also known as Jupiter XII, is a natural satellite or moon of Jupiter. It is one of Jupiter's irregular moons, which orbit far from the planet on highly inclined and eccentric orbits. Ananke was discovered by Seth Barnes Nicholson at Mount Wilson Observatory in 1951.

It orbits Jupiter in the retrograde direction—opposite to the direction of the planet's rotation—at an average distance of 21.0 million km (13.0 million mi). It is the largest member of the Ananke group, a group moons are believed to be fragments of an asteroid or trans-Neptunian object that was gravitationally captured by Jupiter and destroyed by a collision several billion years ago. Most of Ananke 's physical properties are unknown, it to be about 29 km in diameter and its surface is be dark and boundary between grey and light red.

== Discovery and naming ==
It was discovered by Seth Barnes Nicholson at Mount Wilson Observatory in 1951.

It is named after the Greek mythological Ananke, the personification of necessity, and the mother of the Moirai (Fates) by Zeus. Ananke did not receive its present name until 1975; before then, it was simply known as Jupiter XII. It was sometimes called "Adrastea" between 1955 and 1975 (Adrastea is now the name of another satellite of Jupiter).

== Orbit ==
The satellite orbits Jupiter at a mean distance of 21,042,470 km and completes one orbit in 623,59 days. Its orbit has an inclination of 149° relative to the ecliptic and an eccentricity of 0.174. The orbit is subject to continuous changes due to gravitational perturbation from the Sun and the other planets.

=== Group membership and origin ===
Ananke gives its name to the Ananke group, a group of irregular retrograde Jovian moons. Members of this group orbit Jupiter at distances of approximately 19 to 22 million km, with orbital inclinations ranging from 144° to 156° and eccentricities between 0.10 and 0.30. The moons of the Ananke group are believed to be fragments of an asteroid or trans-Neptunian object that was gravitationally captured by Jupiter and destroyed by a collision several billion years ago.

== Physical characteristics ==
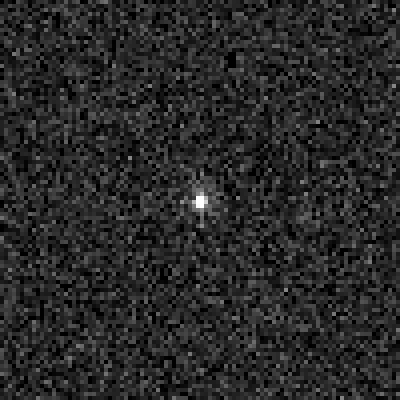
Single-exposure image of Ananke by the Wide-field Infrared Survey Explorer (WISE) spacecraft in 2010

According to thermal infrared measurements by the WISE space telescope, Ananke has an albedo of approximately 3.8%. Based on this value, the moon is estimated to have a diameter of approximately 29.1 km. The shape of the moon is currently unknown. However, given its small size, Ananke is likely to have an irregular shape, similar to other irregular moons.

The mass from Ananke (1.68×10^{16} kg) was calculated using a density value of 1,30 typical of P-type asteroid.

In the visible spectrum, Ananke appears neutral to light-red (colour indices B-V=0.90 V-R=0.38). The infrared spectrum is similar to P-type asteroid s but with a possible indication of water.

The rotation period was determined to be approximately 8 hours and 18.6 minutes with a peak amplitude of about ~0.4 magnitudes. This was regarded by a later paper as uncertain due to the short observation periods.

== Exploration ==
Ananke has not been imaged up close by a space probe. All Jupiter irregular moons including Ananke are planned to be distant observation targets for the European Space Agency's Jupiter Icy Moons Explorer (Juice) mission, which will measure the Jupiter irregular moons' rotation periods and shapes by watching their brightness change over time.

== See also ==
- Irregular satellites
- Other irregular Jovian moons discovered by Seth Barnes Nicholson:
  - Sinope
  - Lysithea
  - Carme
