= Chaotic rotation =

Irregular and unpredictable rotation of an astronomical body

Chaotic rotation involves the irregular and unpredictable rotation of an astronomical body, typically seen in objects that are not spherical or spheroidal and influenced by other forces. Unlike Earth's rotation, a chaotic rotation may not have a nearly fixed axis or period.

Simulation of the chaotic rotation of Pluto's moon Nix, modeled as an ellipsoid.

== Causes ==
Because of the conservation of angular momentum, chaotic rotation is not seen in objects that are spherically symmetric or well isolated from gravitational interaction but is the result of the interactions within a system of orbiting bodies, similar to those associated with orbital resonance. However, over 4 or 5 million years, the chaos present in the orbit(s) is unlikely to cause major impacts. Of the 1% of planetary systems taken into effect, Mercury is projected to overlap orbits with Venus, potentially altering the Solar System.

Bodies with irregular shapes (not spherical) tend to lead to chaotic behavior due to uneven gravitational forces. A more elliptical orbit relating to eccentricity also increases chaotic rotation. Lyapunov time measures the rate at which the rotation of a body becomes chaotic. There is also tidal despinning, where tidal forces slow a satellite's rotation.

== Examples ==
=== Moons with chaotic rotation ===
Examples of chaotic rotation include Hyperion, a moon of Saturn, which rotates so unpredictably that the Cassini probe could not be reliably scheduled to pass by unexplored regions, and Pluto's Nix, Hydra, and possibly Styx and Kerberos, and also Neptune's Nereid. According to Mark R. Showalter, author of a 2015 study "Nix can flip its entire pole. It could actually be possible to spend a day on Nix in which the sun rises in the east and sets in the north. It is almost random-looking in the way it rotates."

=== Galaxies with chaotic rotation ===
Another example is that of galaxies; from careful observation by the Keck and Hubble telescopes of hundreds of galaxies, a trend was discovered that suggests galaxies such as the Milky Way used to have a very chaotic rotation, with planetary bodies and stars rotating randomly. New evidence suggests that the Milky Way galaxy and others have settled into an orderly, disk-like rotation over the past 8 billion years and that other galaxies are slowly following suit over time.

== Stabilization mechanisms and effects ==
Asteroids, moons, and other irregularly shaped bodies that exhibit eccentric orbits have chaotic rotation due to periodic gravitational torques. Tidal forces, like the ones that affect ocean waves on Earth, can cause these chaotic motions to stabilize or lead to tidal locking. Tidal locking happens when an astronomical body's rotation aligns with the larger body's rotation. A good example of this is Earth and its moon. The Moon always faces Earth from the same side, no matter where it's observed from the surface. In other cases, such as Pluto, effects such as gravitational fluctuation can act as a form of opposition.

As alluded to before, planetary bodies are also sometimes subjected to chaotic rotation. This is especially true for exoplanets, planets similar to Earth in possibly able to facilitate life, which are outside the Solar System. Many of these planets may have experienced some aspect of chaotic rotation before reaching stability. There are some exoplanets still undergoing chaotic movement, characterized by harsh climates and atmospheric changes. Scientists typically look toward eccentricity when determining if an exoplanet exhibits chaotic patterns. These exoplanets help determine the origins of planetary systems.

== Scientific studies and future research ==
One study used analytical and numerical methods to understand the implications of chaotic rotation. Overall, slower rotation rates were found to expand the area in which it occurs, sometimes doubling in size. In addition, chaotic orbital zones form around bodies shaped like a dumbbell. The asteroids 243 Ida and 25143 Itokawa are examples from this study through the way Ida's moon Dactyl orbits at the edge of its chaotic zone. Kepler map techniques were used to determine these results.

Another study observed the case where a planetary body's rotation is synchronized with its orbit. Mercury is one such example. Using the MEGNO (Mean Exponential Growth of Nearby Orbits) technique, researchers were able to test plane oscillations and three-dimensional rotations of rigid bodies. It was found that small perturbations in stability do not immediately lead to chaotic behavior in plane rotations. The intent is to use this software to observe planetary evolution and the effects of rotation.

== See also ==
- List of orbits
- Orbital mechanics
- Solar System
- Gravity
