= Mab (moon) =

Moon of Uranus

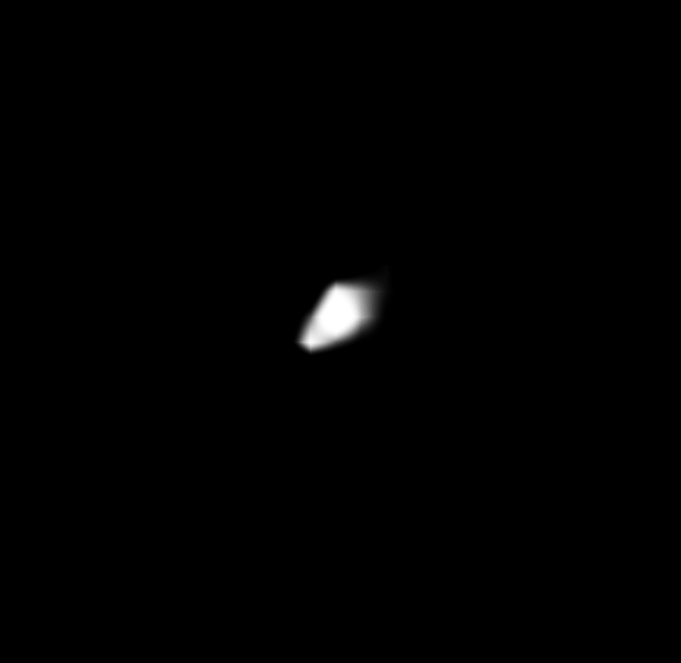

Discovery
- Discovered by: Mark R. Showalter and Jack J. Lissauer
- Discovery date: August 25, 2003

Designations
- Designation: Uranus XXVI
- Pronunciation: /ˈmæb/
- Adjectives: Mabian

Orbital characteristics
- Epoch 2008-09-01 00:00:00 UTC
- Semi-major axis: 97735.966 km
- Eccentricity: 0.00347
- Orbital period (sidereal): 0.923 d (calculated)
- Average orbital speed: 7.70 km/s (calculated)
- Inclination: 0.12217° (to Uranus's equator)
- Satellite of: Uranus

Physical characteristics
- Mean radius: 6 km/12.4±0.5 km
- Mean density: 0.5–1.2 g/cm^{3}
- Synodic rotation period: synchronous (presumed)
- Axial tilt: 0 (assumed)
- Albedo: ~0.46/0.1 (assumed)
- Apparent magnitude: 26 (R)

Mab, or Uranus XXVI, is an inner satellite of Uranus. It likely has an ice-rich surface comparable to that of Miranda, unlike the other inner moons, and is the source of the μ ring. Mab's orbit is the outermost of the inner moons of Uranus, and its physical size is one of the smallest.

== Discovery and naming ==
It was discovered by Mark R. Showalter and Jack J. Lissauer in 2003 using the Hubble Space Telescope. It was named after Queen Mab, a fairy queen from English folklore who is mentioned in William Shakespeare's play Romeo and Juliet.

Because the moon is very small, it was not seen in the heavily scrutinized images taken by Voyager 2 during its Uranus flyby in 1986. However, it is brighter than another moon, Perdita, which was discovered from Voyager's photos in 1997. This led scientists to re-examine the old photos again, and the satellite was finally found in the images. Following its discovery, Mab was given the temporary designation S/2003 U 1.

== Orbit ==
Mab orbits between the moons Puck and Miranda, and is the outermost inner moon of Uranus. It orbits at the same distance from Uranus as the μ ring (formerly known as R/2003 U 1), a dusty ring discovered around the same time as the moon. The μ ring is blue in colour, although this is attributed to the small size of the particles instead of the material's intrinsic colour. It is the only blue ring in the Solar System known other than Saturn's E Ring. Mab is presumably the source of this ring, and it is likely composed of small water ice particles lifted off Mab's surface by micrometeoroid impacts. The moon is nearly the optimal size for dust production, since larger moons can recollect the escaping dust and smaller moons have too small surface areas for supplying the ring via ring particle or meteoroid collisions. No rings associated with Perdita and Cupid have been found, probably because Belinda limits the lifetimes of dust they generate.

Mab's orbit was thought to be heavily perturbed. At one point, its location shifted from where it was expected to be by 100 km in as little as six days. One idea proposed to explain this is that it is pulled on by a number of undetected moonlets that share its orbit. Later it was found that the apparent orbital variation was due to an instrumental error.

== Physical characteristics ==
The size of Mab is not precisely known and has not been measured, so it is inferred by assuming the albedo to be similar to that of one of Mab's neighbouring moons, those being Puck and Miranda. If it is as dark as Puck (albedo 10%), it would be about 12 km (7.5 mi) in radius. On the other hand, if it has a relatively bright surface like the neighbouring moon Miranda (albedo 46%), it would have a radius of 6 km (3.7 mi). This would be smaller than Cupid and make it one of the smallest Uranian satellites.

A study in 2006 reported observations with the Keck telescope failed to detect Mab in the near-infrared (2.2 μm). They hypothesized that Mab was covered in ice, similar to the classical moons of Uranus, making its radius in the range of 6–8 km (3.7–5.0 mi). Another observing group in 2019, using the same telescope, again failed to find Mab in the ~1.6 μm range. They proposed that Mab's non-detection at both these wavelengths could be explained by the presence of water ice, as it has dark absorption bands at ~1.5 μm and ~2.0 μm, supporting a smaller icy body. Infrared observations published in 2023 finally managed to detect Mab in the near-infrared with the Keck telescope, by integrating multiple images together using the shift-and-stack method. Their results favoured Mab being a 6 km (3.7 mi) radius body with a brighter, Miranda-like surface that is rich in water ice; though it could not fully leave out the possibility of it being a 12 km (7.5 mi) radius body with a dark, Puck-like surface.

Mab also appears spectrally blue, like Miranda, indicative of water ice. Its spectral slope is the only one among the inner moons of Uranus that is similar to Miranda's.

== See also ==
- Moons of Uranus
- Enceladus, the source of Saturn's blue E Ring
