= Daphnis (moon) =

Moon of Saturn

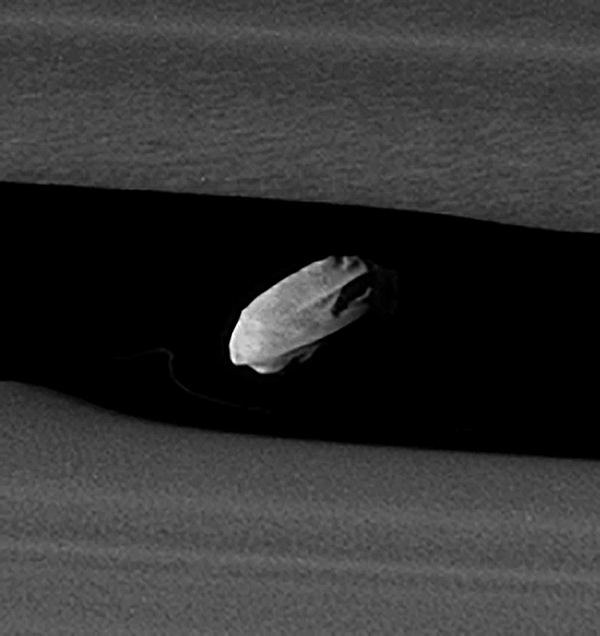
- Cassini probe image of Daphnis surrounded by Saturn's rings (2017)

Discovery
- Discovered by: Cassini Imaging Science Team
- Discovery date: May 1, 2005

Designations
- Designation: Saturn XXXV
- Pronunciation: /ˈdæfnəs/
- Named after: Δάφνις Daphnis
- Alternative names: S/2005 S 1
- Adjectives: Daphnidian /dæfˈnɪdiən/

Orbital characteristics
- Epoch 2005 May 1 09:56:20 (JD 2453491.91412)
- Semi-major axis: 136505.5±0.1 km
- Eccentricity: 0.0000331±0.0000062
- Orbital period (sidereal): 0.5940798 d (14.257915 h)
- Inclination: 0.0036°±0.0013°
- Satellite of: Saturn

Physical characteristics
- Dimensions: 9.8 × 8.4 × 5.6 km (± 0.6 × 1.6 × 1.2 km)
- Mean diameter: 7.8±1.0 km
- Volume: 248 km^{3} (Note: Calculated from Daphnis's volume-equivalent sphere radius of 3.9±0.5 km given by Thomas et al. (2020))
- Mass: (6.8±1.7)×10^{13} kg
- Mean density: 0.276±0.144 g/cm^{3}
- Surface gravity: 0.0002 m/s^{2} at longest axis to 0.0006 m/s^{2} at poles
- Escape velocity: 0.001 km/s at longest axis to 0.002 km/s at poles
- Synodic rotation period: synchronous
- Axial tilt: assumed zero
- Albedo: 0.91±0.07 (geometric)
- Temperature: ≈ 78 K

Daphnis is an inner satellite of Saturn. It is also known as Saturn XXXV; its provisional designation was S/2005 S 1. Daphnis is about 7.8 kilometers (4.8 mi) in diameter, and orbits the planet in the Keeler Gap within the A ring.

== Discovery and naming ==
Before it was photographed, the existence of a moon in Daphnis's position had already been inferred from gravitational ripples observed on the edges of the Keeler gap.

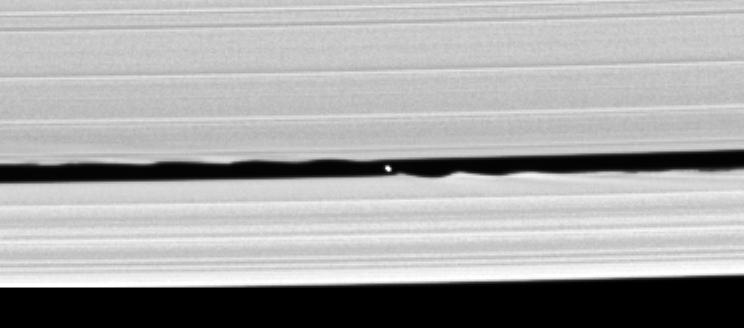
Daphnis was resolved into a disc for the first time in this 2005 Cassini probe image. The gravitational ripples on the edges of the rings, which had earlier hinted at the moon's presence, are clearly visible.

The discovery of Daphnis was announced by the Cassini Imaging Science Team on May 10, 2005. The discovery images were taken by the Cassini probe over 16 min on May 1, 2005, from a time-lapse sequence of 0.180 second narrow-angle-camera exposures of the outer edge of the A ring. The moon was subsequently found in 32 low-phase images taken of the F ring on April 13, 2005 (spanning 18 min) and again in two high-resolution (3.54 km (2.20 mi)/pixel) low-phase images taken on May 2, 2005, when its 7 km (4.3 mi) disk was resolved.

The moon was named in 2006 after Daphnis, a shepherd, pipes player, and pastoral poet in Greek mythology; he was descendant of the Titans, after whom the largest moons of Saturn are named. Both Daphnis and Pan, the only other known shepherd moon to orbit within Saturn's main rings, are named for mythological figures associated with shepherds.

== Orbit ==
The inclination and eccentricity of Daphnis's orbit are very small, but distinguishable from zero. Both, particularly the inclination, are significantly greater than those of Pan (the larger moonlet which forms the Encke Gap). Daphnis's eccentricity causes its distance from Saturn to vary by ~9 km (5.6 mi), and its inclination causes it to move up and down by ~17 km (11 mi). The Keeler Gap in Saturn's dense A ring, within which Daphnis orbits, is about 42 km (26 mi) wide.

=== Effect on Saturn's rings ===
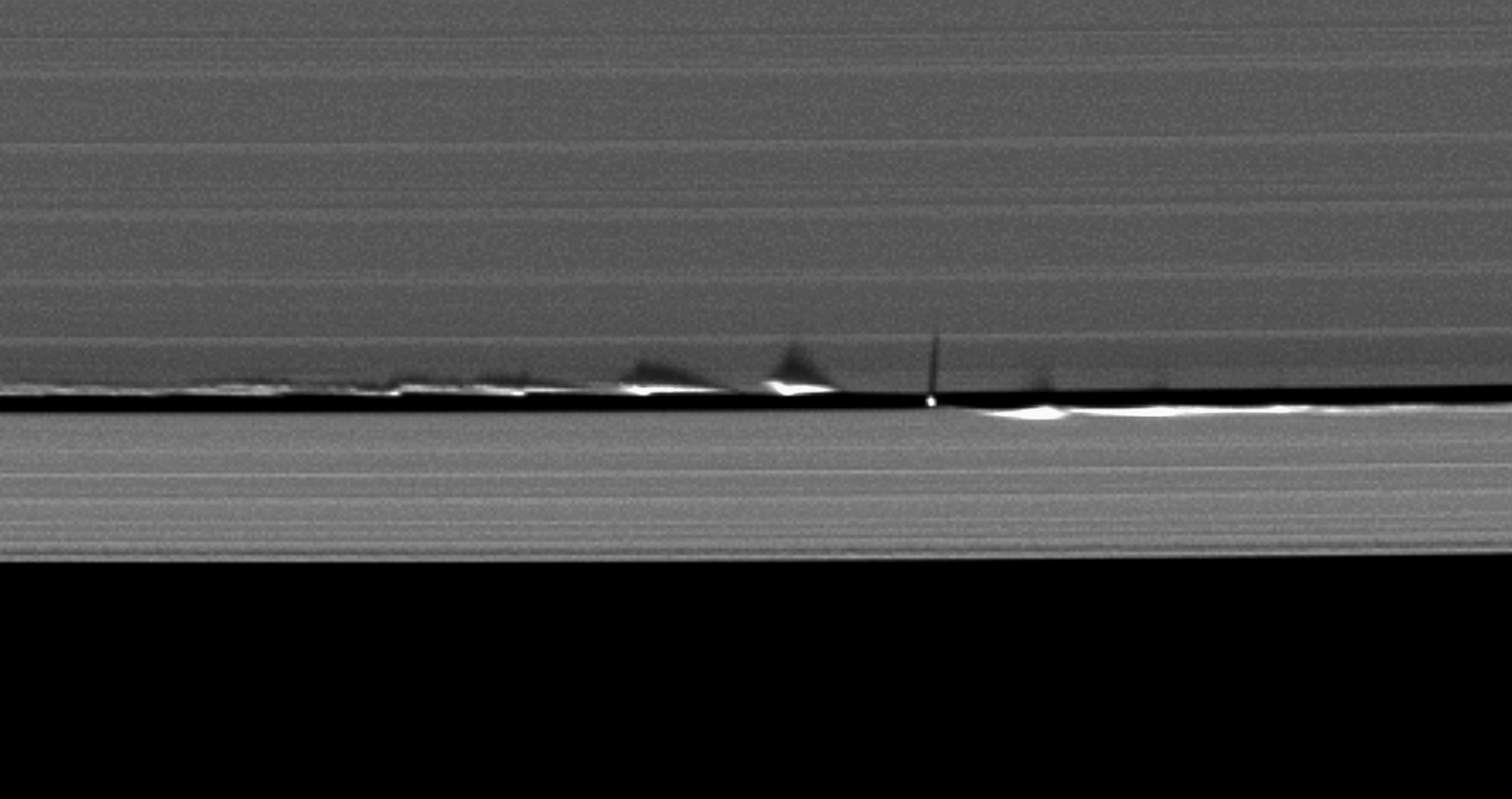
The waves that Daphnis induces nearby in the A ring have vertical relief (due to its orbital inclination) and cast shadows when Saturn is close to its equinox.

As it orbits, it creates gravitational ripples on the edges of the Keeler gap as ring particles are attracted toward the moon and then fall back down toward the ring. The waves made by the moon in the inner edge of the gap precede it in orbit, while those on the outer edge lag behind it, due to the differences in relative orbital speed. In a photograph taken on January 18, 2017, a tendril of ring particles can be seen to extend toward the moon; according to JPL, "this may have resulted from a moment when Daphnis drew a packet of material out of the ring, and now that packet is spreading itself out."

== Physical characteristics ==
On January 18, 2017, Daphnis was photographed from a sufficiently close distance to reveal its shape. The moon was discovered to be an irregularly-shaped object with a mostly smooth surface, a few craters, and an equatorial ridge. There is also another ridge in the northern hemisphere extending roughly 90° in longitude. Due to its low density, Daphnis is expected to have a porosity of over 60%.

For shepherd moons, the thickness of the equatorial ridge is expected to correlate with the orbital inclination of the moon and the thickness of the ring in which it is in. The small size of Daphnis means the entire surface is expected to be covered in ring particles. This combined with the fact that the size of the equatorial ridge is only 1% of the total volume of the moon, suggests the ridge is a reflection of density variations within the ring rather than its thickness.
