= Equatorial ridge =

Ridges near equators

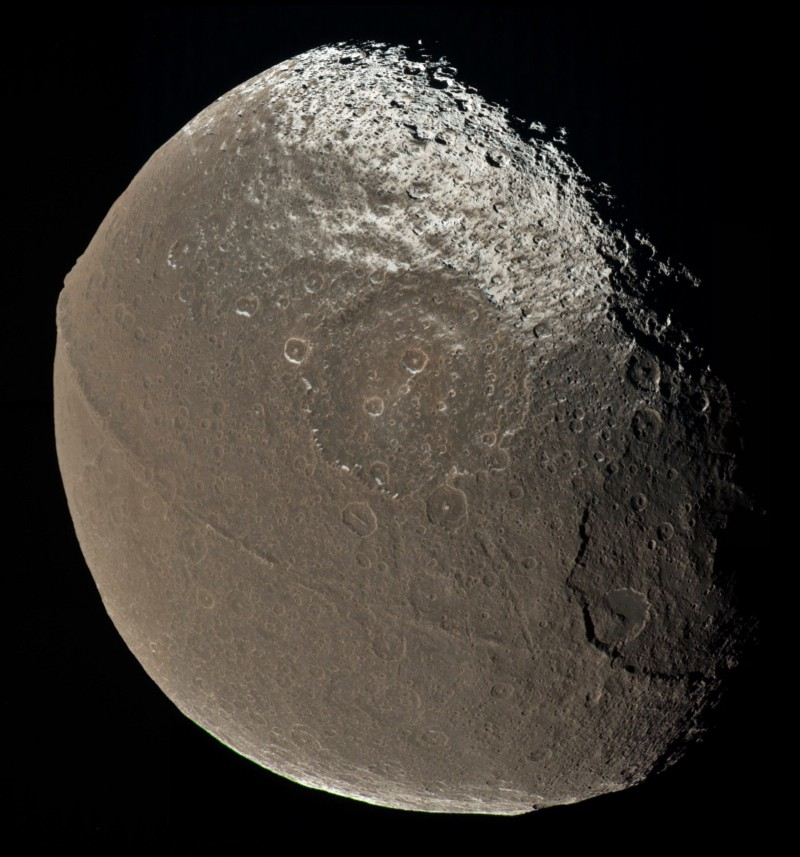
The ridge on Saturn's moon Iapetus

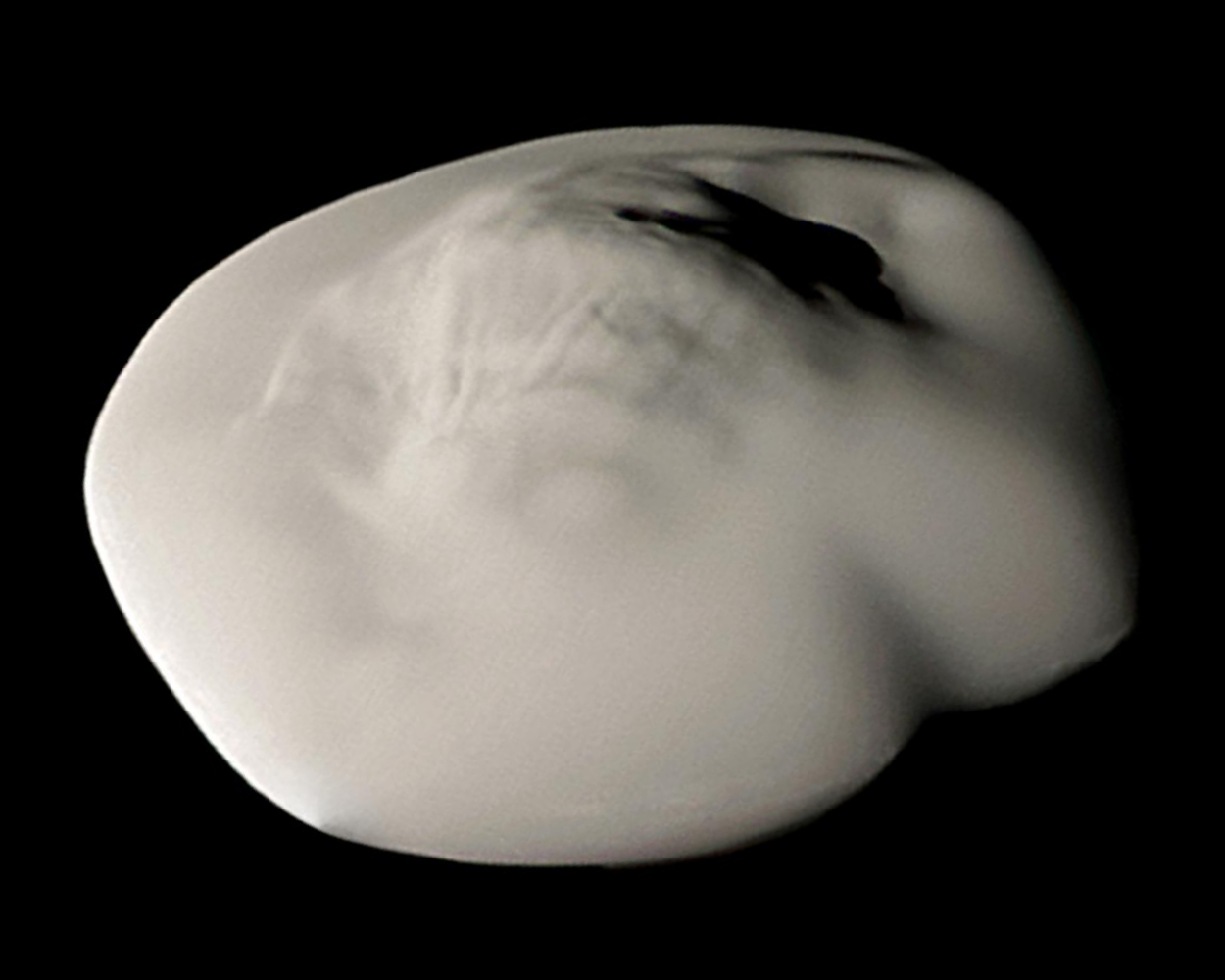
The prominent ridge on Saturn's moon Atlas

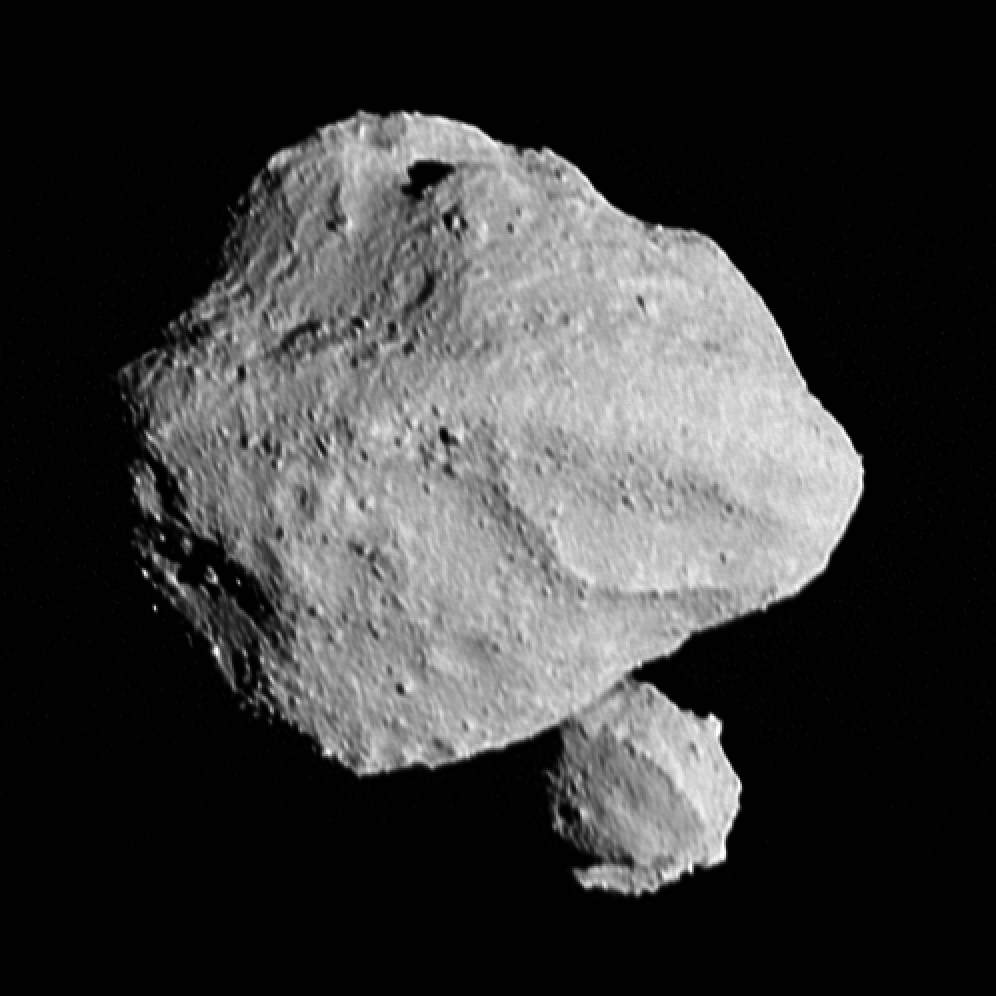
The ridge on the asteroid 152830 Dinkinesh

An equatorial ridge is a topographic ridge that follows a celestial body's equator. At least three of Saturn's moons host equatorial ridges: the large moon Iapetus and the tiny moons Atlas and Pan. They are ridges that closely follow the moons' equators. They appear to be unique to the Saturnian system, but it is uncertain whether the occurrences are related or a coincidence.

Iapetus was discovered by Italian-born French astronomer Giovanni Domenico Cassini in October 1781; Atlas was discovered from the images taken by Voyager 1 during its flyby of Saturn in November 1980; while Pan was discovered by Showalter in the same year as Atlas. Lastly, the very small moon Daphnis, discovered by the Cassini in 2005, also appears to have such a ridge.

All three equatorial ridges were discovered by the Cassini spacecraft.

The ridge on Iapetus is nearly 20 km wide, 13 km high and 1,300 km long. The ridge on Atlas is proportionally even more remarkable given the moon's much smaller size, giving it a disk-like shape. Images of Pan show a structure similar to that of Atlas.

== Structure ==
Iapetus' equatorial ridge wraps most of the way around its equator. It is cratered just as much as the terrain around it, which suggests that the ridge is around the same age as its surroundings. By being this large of a feature, it suggests that whatever created it is on a global scale rather than under local or regional control. "The ridge generally appears to be single, but in some places, it is double or triple. The flanks are steep with slopes in some sections greater than 30 degrees. The volume of material involved in the ridge is very large. It spans at least half of the equator and is well developed over a length of ~1600 km... This estimate does not include any allowance for roots or folds."

Atlas and Pan's equatorial ridges were discovered by images sent back from the Voyager spacecraft in the early 1980s. Pan is located inside the Encke Gap of Saturn's A ring while Atlas is located just outside of the A ring. They are shaped like "oblate ellipsoids, with equatorial radii of 16.5 and ~19.5 km, and polar radii of ~10.5 km and 9 km for Pan and Atlas, respectively... More unexpectedly, both have a prominent equatorial ridge. These ridges are roughly symmetric about the bodies' equators and give them the appearance of a "flying saucer"."

== Formation ==
It is not certain how these ridges formed, or whether there is any connection between them. Because Atlas and Pan orbit within the rings of Saturn, a likely explanation for their ridges is that they sweep up ring particles as they orbit, which build up around their equators. This hypothesis is less applicable to Iapetus, which orbits far beyond the rings. One scientist has suggested that Iapetus swept up a ring before being somehow expelled to its current, distant orbit. Others think it was stationary and it is the rings that have been pulled away from it, falling into Saturn's gravity field. Perhaps more likely is the hypothesis that because Iapetus has an unusually large Hill sphere compared to other moons in the Solar System, it could once have had its own ring, or even a moonlet that was slowly pulled in closer, torn up into a ring, and then gradually accreted onto Iapetus' equator. Some scientists prefer to assume that Iapetus's ridge was produced by some kind of internal source and is unrelated to the ridges on Atlas and Pan. Another hypothesis suggested is that low velocity collisions between moons could have formed the bulge at the centre, although the circumstances for such an event to happen are slim.

It is unclear how the ridge was formed. The ridge being at the equator suggests a few different ideas: Porco et al. (2005) suggests it comes from despinning, Denk et al. (2005) suggests volcanic activity, Giese et al. (2005) suggests the ridge morphology indicates the surface is warping up due to a tectonic event.

There are a number of circumstances that have been proposed as to how the ridges of Atlas and Pan were created: "(i) Contrary to other resolved satellites, Pan and Atlas are embedded in Saturn's rings. (ii) The ridges are equatorial and precisely in the same plane as Saturn's rings. (iii) The vertical motion of Atlas (and Perhaps Pan) through the rings is approximately equal to the vertical extent of the ridges. (iv) the total volume of the ridges is ~10 to 25% of the bodies' volume. Therefore, we have explored the possibility that the ridges are made of ring particles accreted lately onto the surface of a preexisting moonlet embedded in the rings and initially free of any equatorial ridge. Then, a ridge would be simply an "equatorial ornament" accumulated onto the body's surface as a later stage in the formation process."

The particles that make up the ridges of each of the moons most likely developed differently due to the fact that Pan and Atlas have very different orbital properties. Pan has an almost circular orbit around Saturn. This causes particles from the rings to reach Pan's surface with a low velocity which allows it to separate particles between the two hemispheres. Inner particles (ring-particles with semimajor axes inward of their respective satellite) populate the hemisphere facing Saturn while outer particles (ring-particles with semimajor axes outward of their respective satellite) populate the hemisphere opposite of Saturn. Atlas, however, has a very eccentric orbit around Saturn. At its periapsis, it will orbit at a higher velocity which causes inner particles to accrete onto Atlas's leading hemisphere. When it's at apoapsis, it will be orbiting at a lower velocity which will cause outer particles to accrete on the trailing hemisphere only.

== See also ==
- Equatorial troughs of asteroid 4 Vesta
