= Nix (moon) =

Moon of Pluto

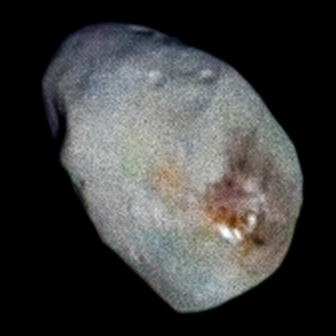
- Enhanced color image of Nix, taken by New Horizons

Discovery
- Discovered by: M. J. Mutchler, A. J. Steffl
- Discovery date: 15 June 2005

Designations
- Designation: Pluto II
- Pronunciation: /ˈnɪks/
- Named after: Nyx
- Alternative names: S/2005 P 2
- Adjectives: Nictian (/ˈnɪktiən/)

Orbital characteristics
- Semi-major axis: 48694±3 km
- Eccentricity: 0.002036±0.000050
- Orbital period (sidereal): 24.85463±0.00003 d
- Inclination: 0.133°±0.008° (122.53°±0.008° to Pluto's orbit)
- Satellite of: Pluto

Physical characteristics
- Dimensions: 49.8 × 33.2 × 31.1 km (Geometric mean of 37 km)
- Mass: (2.60±0.52)×10^{16} kg
- Mean density: 1.031±0.204 g/cm^{3}
- Surface gravity: ≈ 0.0028 m/s^{2} at longest axis to ≈ 0.0072 m/s^{2} at poles
- Escape velocity: ≈ 0.0118 km/s at longest axis to ≈ 0.0149 km/s at poles
- Synodic rotation period: 1.829±0.009 d chaotic (decreased by 10% between discovery and flyby)
- Axial tilt: 123°±10° (to Pluto–Charon orbit); 48°±10° (to celestial equator) (Note: Given Nix's rotational north pole declination of +42°, subtracting this angle from the north celestial pole of +90° gives the inclination with respect to the celestial equator: i = +90° – (+42°) = +48°.)
- North pole right ascension: 350°±10°
- North pole declination: 42°±10°
- Albedo: 0.56±0.05
- Apparent magnitude: 23.38–23.7 (measured)
- Absolute magnitude (H): 8.28

Nix, formal designation (134340) Pluto II, is a natural satellite of Pluto, with a diameter of 49.8 km (30.9 mi) across its longest dimension. It was discovered along with Pluto's outermost moon Hydra on 15 May 2005 by astronomers using the Hubble Space Telescope, and was named after Nyx, the Greek goddess of the night. Nix is the third moon of Pluto by distance, orbiting between the moons Styx and Kerberos.

Nix was imaged along with Pluto and its other moons by the New Horizons spacecraft as it flew by the Pluto system in July 2015. These images reveal a large reddish area on Nix that is likely an impact crater.

== Discovery ==
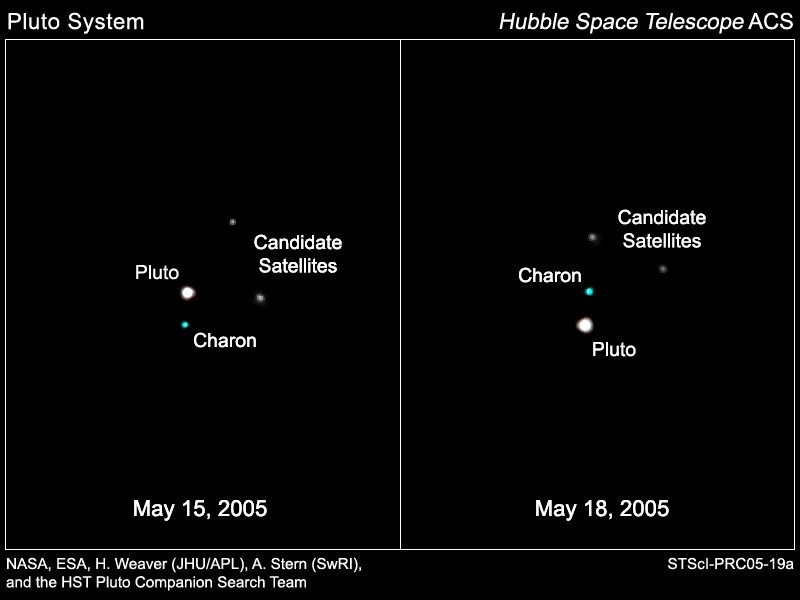
Discovery images of Nix and Hydra

Nix was independently discovered by Max Mutchler and Andrew Steffl, members of the Pluto Companion Search Team, using the Hubble Space Telescope. The New Horizons team had suspected that Pluto and its moon Charon might be accompanied by other moons, hence they used Hubble to search for faint moons around Pluto in 2005. Since Nix's brightness is about 5,000 times fainter than Pluto, long exposure images were taken in order to find it.

The discovery images were taken on 15 May 2005 and 18 May 2005. The discoveries were announced on 31 October 2005, after confirmation by precovering archival Hubble images of Pluto from 2002. The two newly announced moons of Pluto were subsequently provisionally designated S/2005 P 1 for Hydra and S/2005 P 2 for Nix. The moons were informally referred to as "P1" and "P2", respectively by the discovery team.

== Naming ==
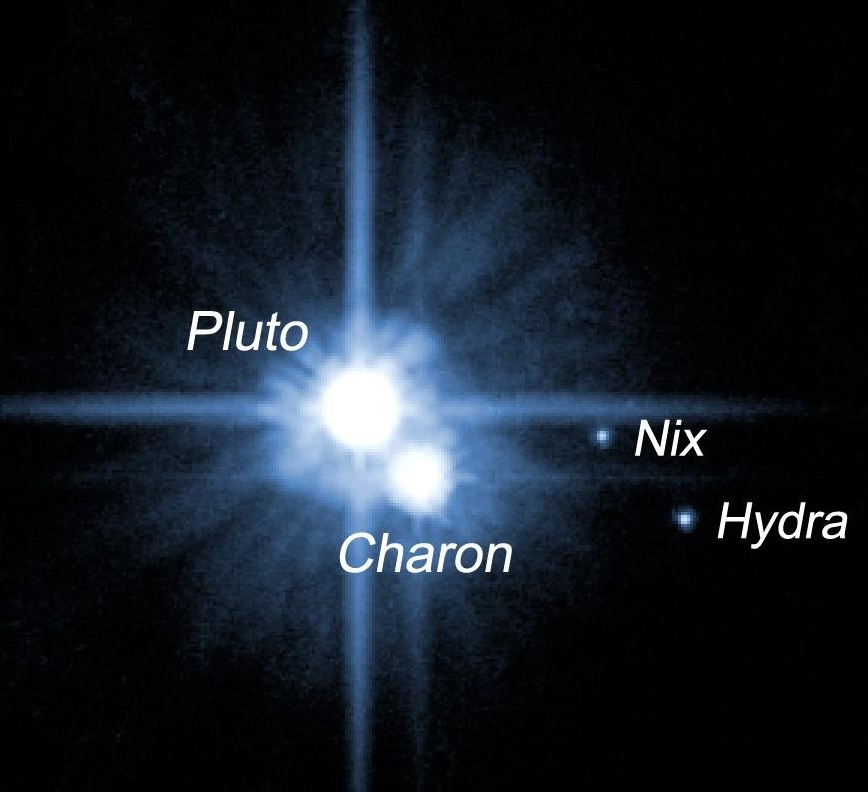
Hubble image of Pluto's moons (annotated)

The name Nix was approved by the International Astronomical Union (IAU) and was announced on 21 June 2006 along with the naming of Hydra in the IAU Circular 8723. Nix was named after Nyx, the Greek goddess of darkness and night and mother of Charon, the ferryman of Hades in Greek mythology. The two newly named moons were intentionally named that the order of their initials N and H honors the New Horizons mission to Pluto, similarly to how the first two letters of Pluto's name honors Percival Lowell. The original proposal for the naming of Nix was to use the classical spelling Nyx, but to avoid confusion with the asteroid 3908 Nyx, the spelling was changed to Nix, the Coptic spelling of the name. The adjectival form of the name is Nictian (cf. Russian Никта Nikta).

The names of features on the bodies in the Pluto system are related to mythology and the literature and history of exploration. In particular, the names of features on Nix must be related to deities of the night from literature, mythology, and history.

== Origin ==
Pluto's smaller moons, including Nix, were thought to have formed from debris ejected from a massive collision between Pluto and another Kuiper belt object, similarly to how the Moon is believed to have formed from debris ejected by a large collision of Earth. The ejecta from the collision would then have coalesced into the moons of Pluto. However, the collisional hypothesis cannot explain how Nix maintained its highly reflective surface.

== Physical characteristics ==
Nix has an elongated shape, with its longest axis measured at 49.8 km (30.9 mi) across and its shortest axis 31.1 km (19.3 mi) across. This gives Nix the measured dimensions of 49.8 km × 33.2 km × 31.1 km (30.9 mi × 20.6 mi × 19.3 mi). It is the third-largest moon of Pluto, being slightly smaller than Hydra.

Early research appeared to show that the surface of Nix is reddish in color. Contrary to this, other studies show that Nix is spectrally neutral, similar to the small moons of Pluto. The neutral spectrum of Nix signifies that water ice is present on its surface. Nix also appeared to vary in brightness and albedo, or reflectivity. The brightness fluctuations were thought to be caused by areas with different albedos on the surface of Nix. Images of Nix from the New Horizons spacecraft show a large reddish area approximately 18 km (11 mi) across, which could explain the two conflicting measurements of Nix's surface color.

The reddish area is thought to be a large impact crater where the reddish material was ejected from underneath Nix's water ice layer and deposited on its surface. In this case, Nix would likely have regoliths originating from the impact. Another explanation suggests that the reddish material may have originated from a collision with Nix and another object with a different composition. However, there were no significant color variations on other impact craters on Nix.

Simulation of Nix, modelled as an ellipsoid, showing its chaotic rotation

The water ice present on the surface of Nix is responsible for its high reflectivity. Trace amounts of frozen methane may be also present on the surface of Nix, and could be responsible for the presence of reddish material, likely tholins, on its surface. In this case, tholins on the surface of Nix may have originated from the reaction of methane with ultraviolet radiation from the Sun. Derived from crater counting data from New Horizons, the age of Nix's surface is estimated to be at least four billion years old.

=== Rotation ===
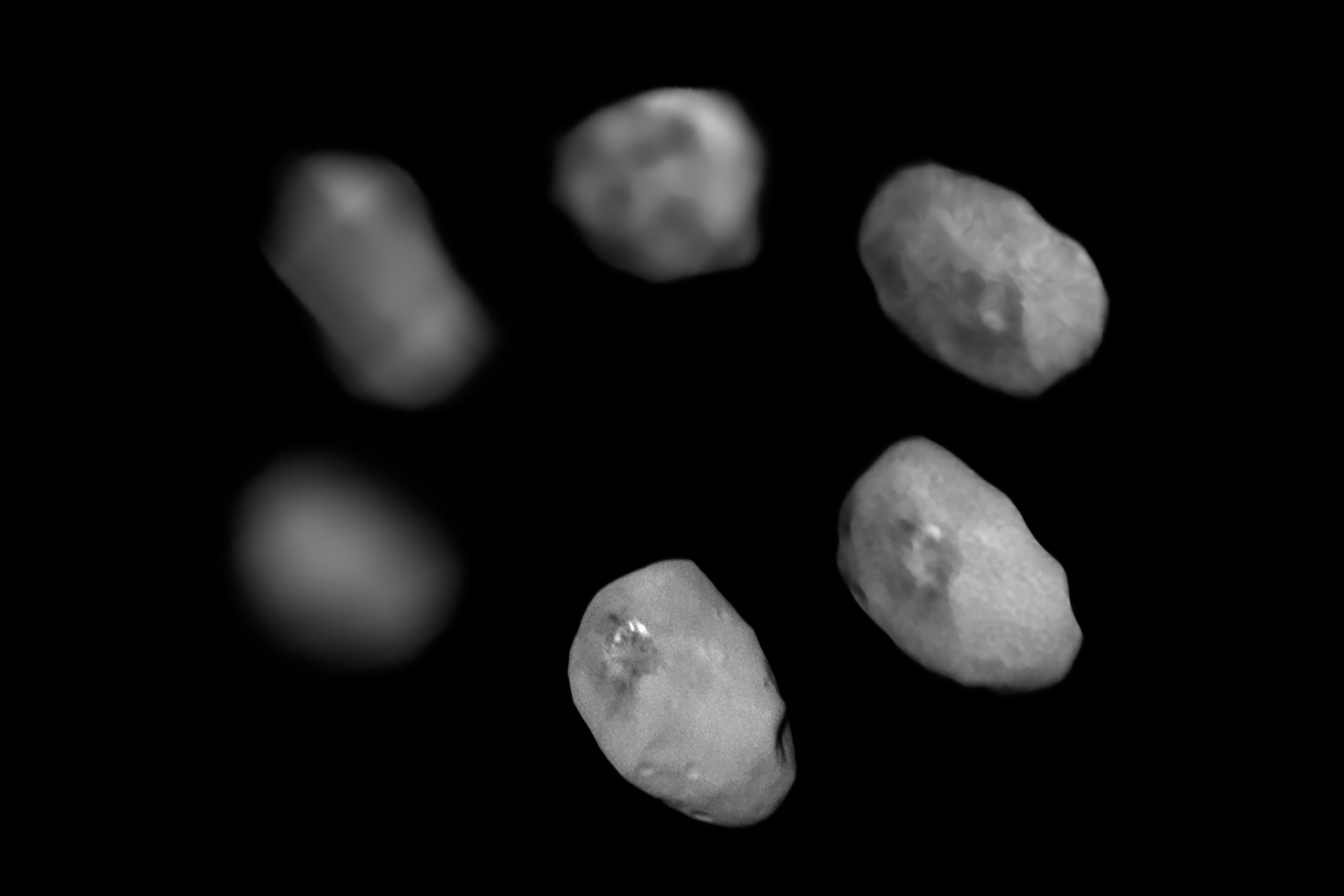
Six images of Nix taken by the New Horizons in July 2015 (contrast enhanced)

Nix is not tidally locked and tumbles chaotically similarly to all smaller moons of Pluto; the moon's axial tilt and rotation period vary greatly over short timescales. Due to the chaotic rotation of Nix, it can occasionally flip its entire rotational axis. The varying gravitational influences of Pluto and Charon as they orbit their barycenter causes the chaotic tumbling of Pluto's small moons, including Nix. The chaotic tumbling of Nix is also strengthened by its elongated shape, which creates torques that act on the object. At the time of the New Horizons flyby, Nix was rotating with a period of 43.9 hours retrograde to Pluto's equator with an axial tilt of 132 degrees — it was rotating backwards in relation to its orbit around Pluto. The rotation rate of Nix had increased by 10 percent since Nix was discovered.

=== Features ===
Image of Nix with its two named craters labeled

Nix has two craters that are officially named after moon deities. The largest named crater of Nix, Gleti, is 13 km (8.1 mi) in diameter and is surrounded by a dark red ejecta blanket. The other named crater of Nix, Metztli, is roughly 10 km (6.2 mi) in diameter.

Feature	Named after	Name approved (Date · Ref)
Gleti	Gleti, Fon goddess of the moon	2021-09-02 · WGPSN
Metztli	Mētztli, the Aztec goddess of the moon	2021-09-02 · WGPSN

== Orbit ==
Animation of moons of Pluto around the barycenter of Pluto – Ecliptic plane

Front view

Side view

Pluto · Charon · Styx · Nix · Kerberos · Hydra

Nix orbits the Pluto–Charon barycenter at a distance of 48,694 km (30,257 mi), between the orbits of Styx and Kerberos. All of Pluto's moons including Nix have very circular orbits that are coplanar to Charon's orbit; the moons of Pluto have very low orbital inclinations to Pluto's equator. The nearly circular and coplanar orbits of Pluto's moons suggest that they may have gone through tidal evolutions since their formation. At the time of the formation of Pluto's smaller moons, Nix may have had a more eccentric orbit around the Pluto–Charon barycenter. The present circular orbit of Nix may have been caused by Charon's tidal damping of the eccentricity of Nix's orbit, through tidal interactions. The mutual tidal interactions of Charon on Nix's orbit would cause Nix to transfer its orbital eccentricity to Charon, thus causing the orbit of Nix to gradually become more circular over time.

Nix's orbital period is close to a 1:4 orbital resonance with Charon, with a timing discrepancy of 2.8%; there is no active resonance. A hypothesis explaining such a near-resonance is that the resonances originated before the outward migration of Charon following the formation of all five known moons, and is maintained by the periodic local fluctuation of 9 percent in the Pluto–Charon gravitational field strength. (Note: The instantaneous force in the Pluto–Charon–Nix alignment case is 9.46% larger than in the quadrature case (where Nix is 90° from the Pluto–Charon axis); the Charon–Pluto–Nix case is almost exactly halfway between these values. In Buie et al., the quote is "The gravitational force exerted by Pluto on either P1 or P2 varies by roughly 15% (peak-to-peak)." Pluto's gravitational pull, by itself, varies by 18% for Nix and 13% for Hydra.)

== Exploration ==
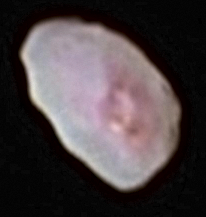
LORRI and MVIC color composite image of Nix

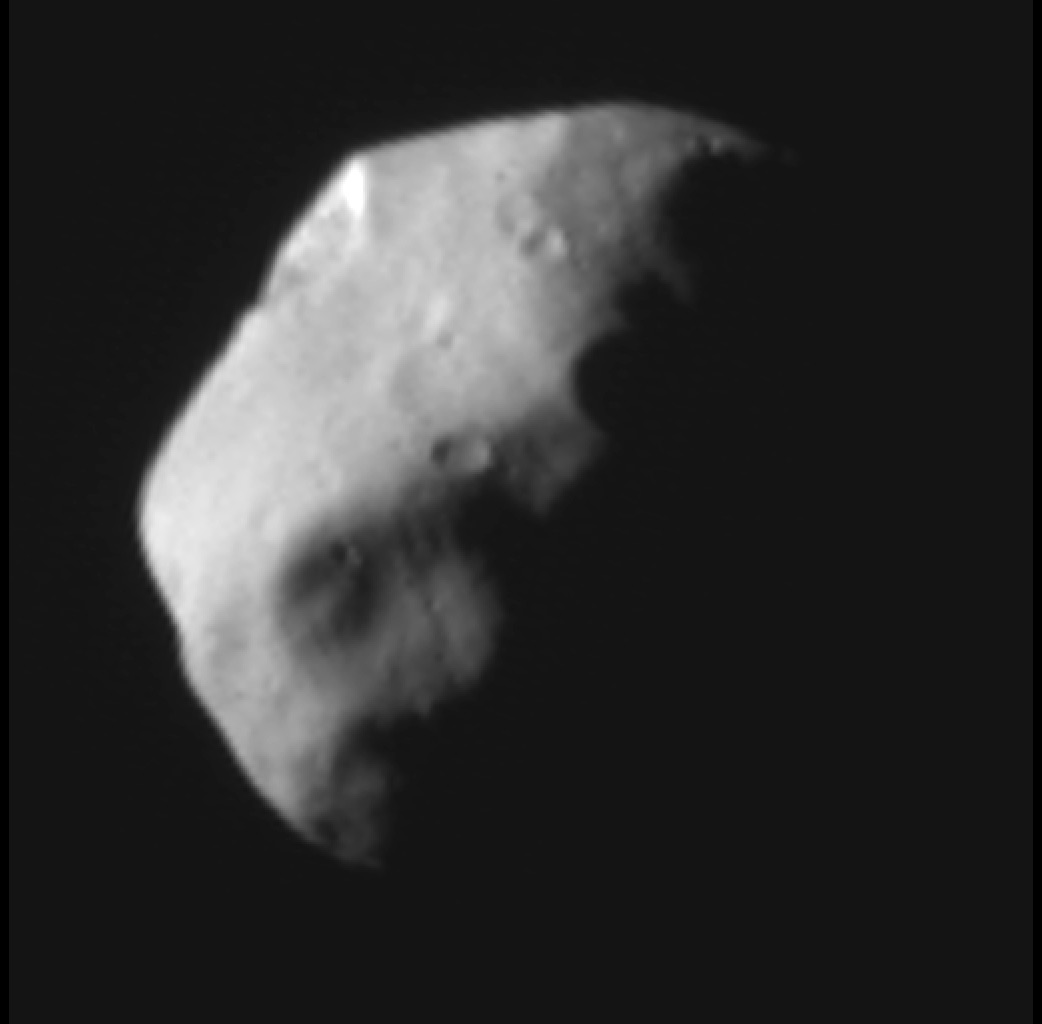
Nix half illuminated, imaged by New Horizons

The New Horizons spacecraft visited the Pluto system and photographed Pluto and its moons during its flyby on 14 July 2015. Of Pluto's smaller moons, only Nix and Hydra were imaged at resolutions high enough for surface features to be visible. Prior to the flyby of the Pluto system, measurements of Nix's size were performed by the Long Range Reconnaissance Imager on board New Horizons, initially estimating Nix to be about 35 km (22 mi) in diameter. The first detailed images of Nix taken by New Horizons from a distance of about 231,000 km (144,000 mi) were downlinked, or received from the spacecraft on 18 July 2015 and released to the public on 21 July 2015. With an image resolution 3 km (1.9 mi) per pixel, Nix's shape was often referred to as a "jelly bean" shape. Enhanced color images from the Ralph MVIC instrument of New Horizons show a reddish region on its surface. From those images, another accurate measurement of Nix's dimensions was made, giving the approximate dimensions of 42 km × 36 km (26 mi × 22 mi).
