= Moons of Pluto =

Natural satellites orbiting Pluto

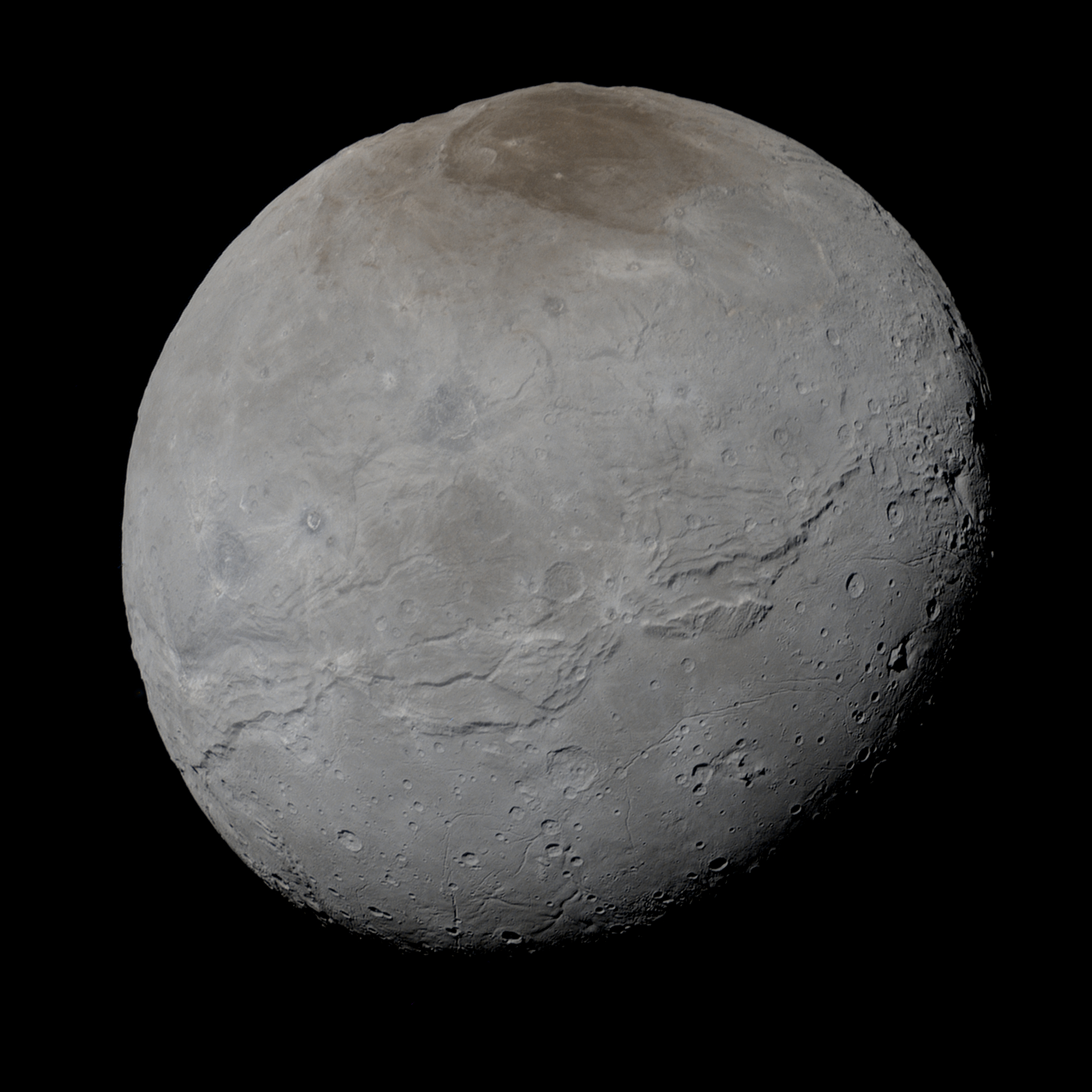
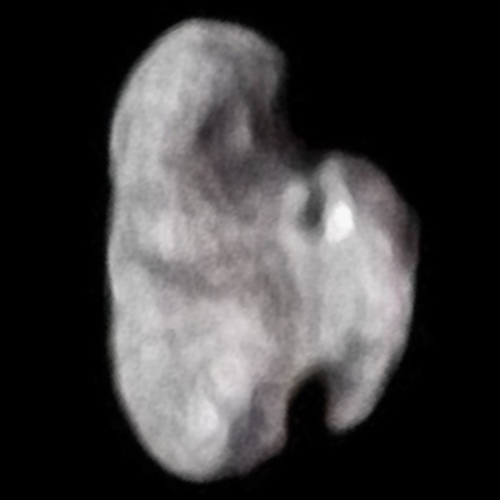
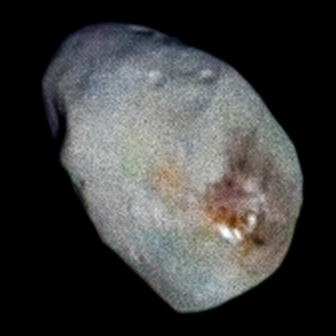
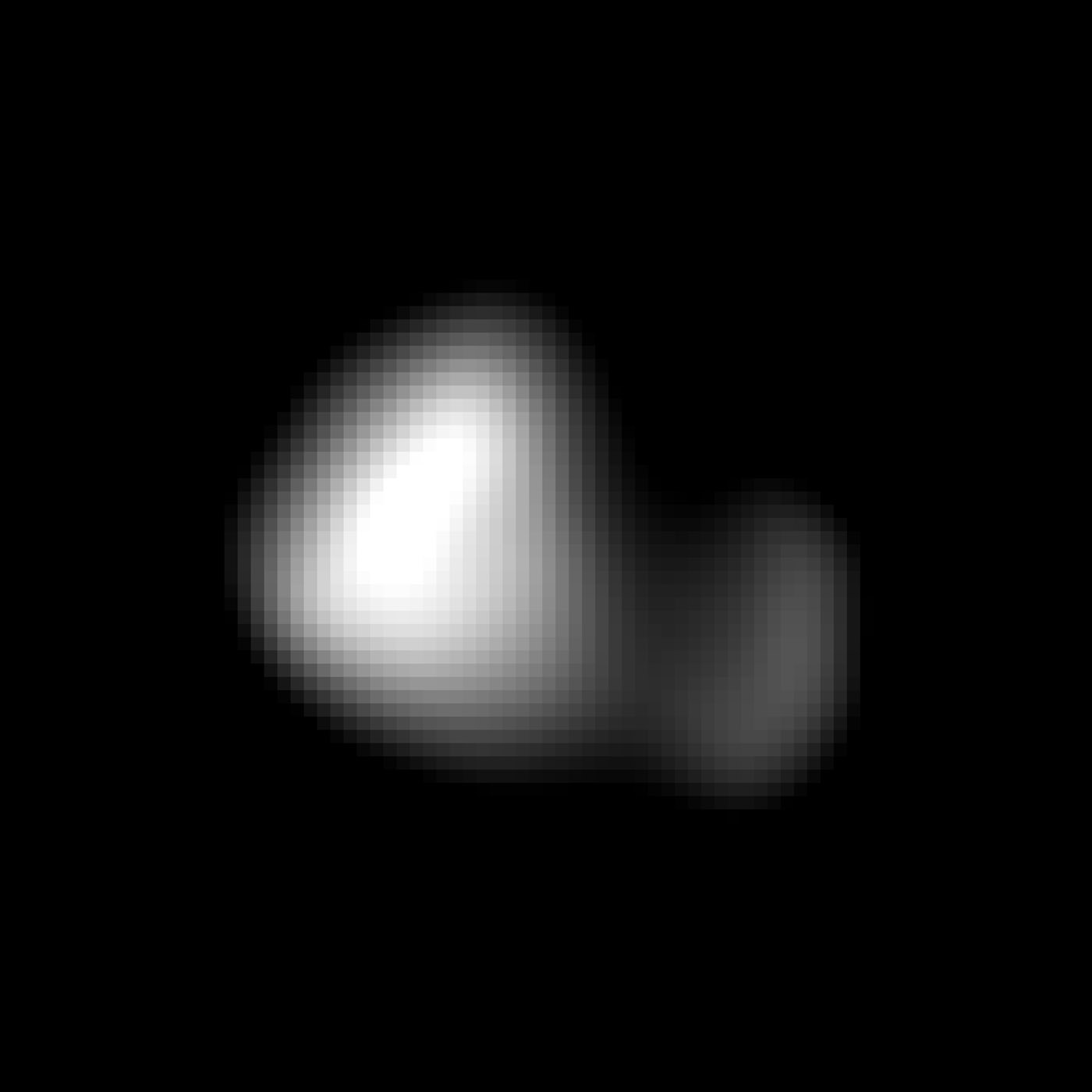
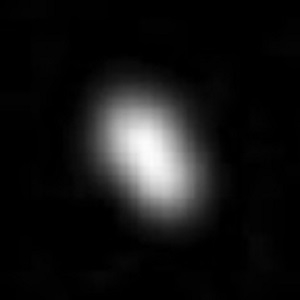
(Images not to scale)
Top: Pluto's largest moon, Charon, with its dark Neverland Regio
Middle: Hydra (left) and Nix (right)
Bottom: Kerberos (left) and Styx (right)

There are five known moons of the dwarf planet Pluto. In order of distance from Pluto, they are Charon, Styx, Nix, Kerberos, and Hydra. Charon, the largest, is mutually tidally locked with Pluto, and is massive enough that Pluto and Charon are sometimes considered a binary dwarf planet.

== History ==
The innermost and largest moon, Charon, was discovered by James Christy on 22 June 1978, nearly half a century after Pluto was discovered. This led to a substantial revision in estimates of Pluto's size, which had previously assumed that the observed mass and reflected light of the system were all attributable to Pluto alone.

Two additional moons were imaged by astronomers of the Pluto Companion Search Team preparing for the New Horizons mission and working with the Hubble Space Telescope on 15 May 2005, which received the provisional designations S/2005 P 1 and S/2005 P 2. The International Astronomical Union officially named these moons Nix (Pluto II, the inner of the two moons, formerly P 2) and Hydra (Pluto III, the outer moon, formerly P 1), on 21 June 2006. Kerberos, announced on 20 July 2011, was discovered while searching for Plutonian rings. The discovery of Styx was announced on 7 July 2012 while looking for potential hazards for New Horizons.

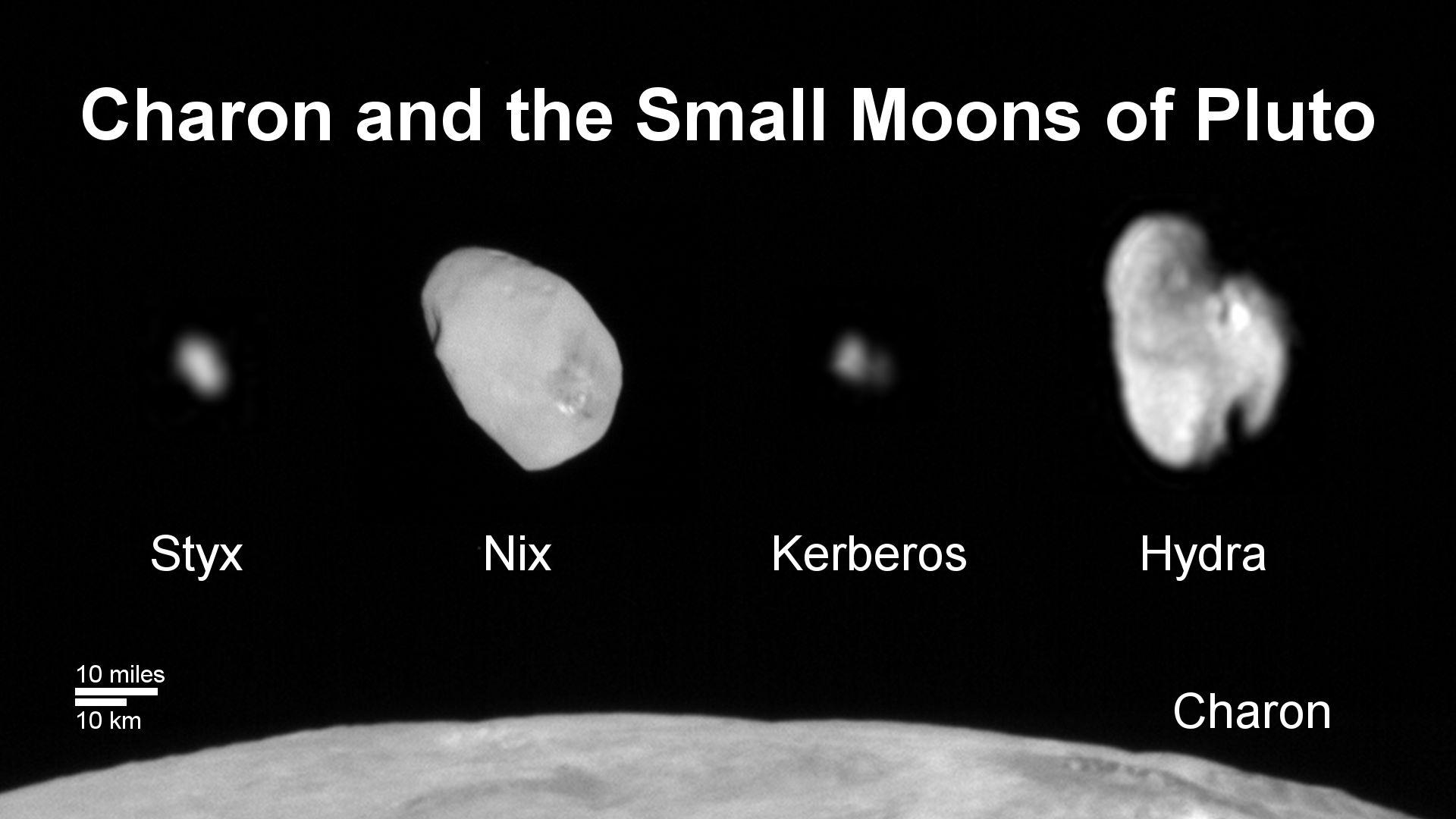
The small moons to approximate scale, compared to Charon

== Charon ==
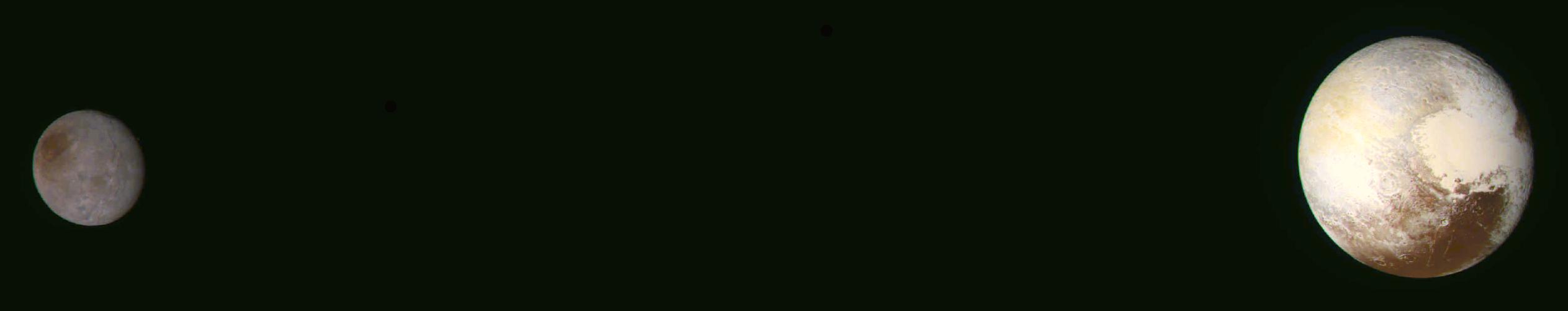
Charon and Pluto, to scale. Photo taken by New Horizons on approach.

Charon is about half the diameter of Pluto and is massive enough (nearly one eighth of the mass of Pluto) that the system's barycenter lies between them, approximately 960 kilometres (600 mi) above Pluto's surface. (Note: "P1P2_motion.avi". Archived from the original (AVI) on 4 November 2005. and barycenter for animations) Charon and Pluto are also tidally locked, so that they always present the same face toward each other. The IAU General Assembly in August 2006 considered a proposal that Pluto and Charon be reclassified as a double planet, but the proposal was abandoned. Like Pluto, Charon is a perfect sphere to within measurement uncertainty.

== Circumbinary moons ==
Animation of moons of Pluto around the barycenter of Pluto - Ecliptic plane

Front view

Side view

Pluto · Charon · Styx · Nix · Kerberos · Hydra

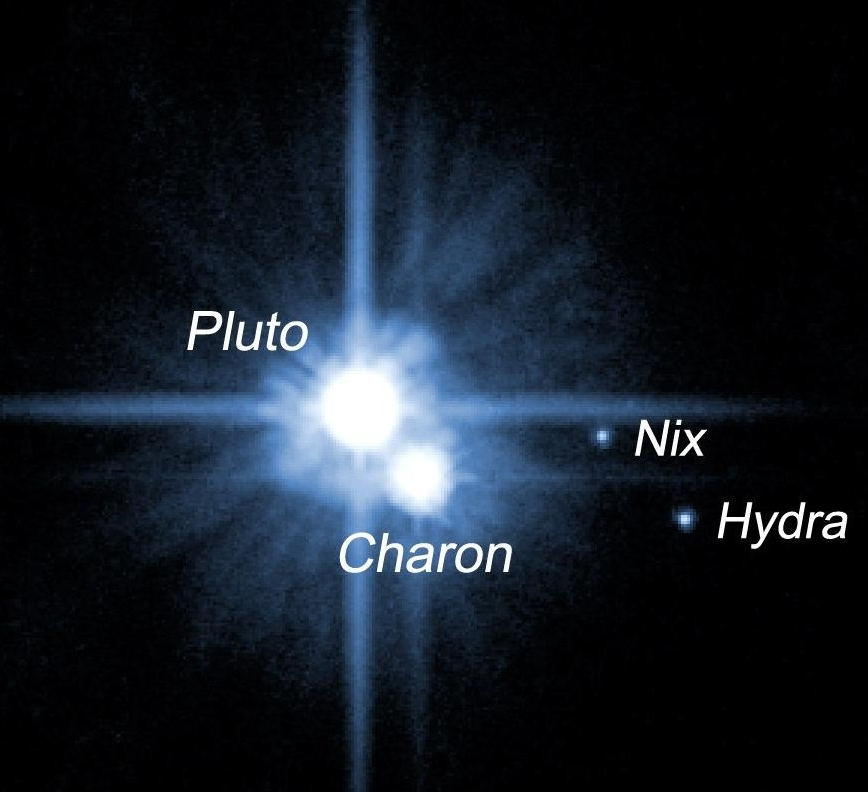
The Hubble discovery image of Nix and Hydra

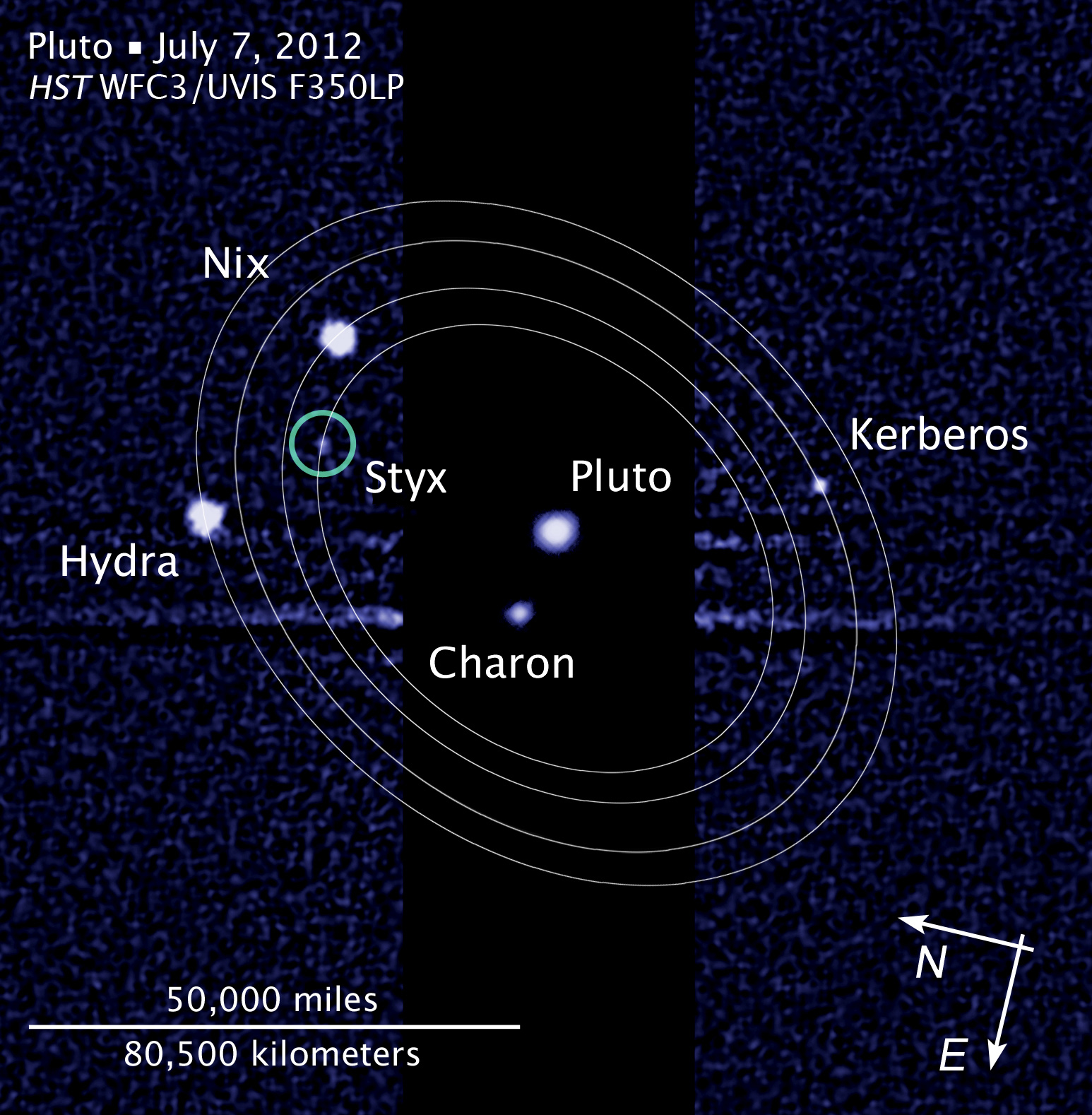
Discovery image of Styx, overlaid with orbits of the satellite system

Pluto's four small circumbinary moons orbit Pluto at two to four times the distance of Charon, ranging from Styx at 42,700 kilometres (26,500 mi) to Hydra at 64,800 kilometres (40,300 mi) from the barycenter of the system. They have nearly circular prograde orbits in the same orbital plane as Charon.

All are much smaller than Charon. Nix and Hydra, the two larger moons, are roughly 42 and 55 kilometres (26 and 34 mi) on their longest axis respectively, and Styx and Kerberos are 7 and 12 kilometres (4.3 and 7.5 mi) respectively. All four are irregularly shaped.

== Characteristics ==
The Pluto system is highly compact and largely empty: prograde moons could stably orbit Pluto out to 53% of the Hill radius (the gravitational zone of Pluto's influence) of 6 million km, or out to 69% for retrograde moons. However, only the inner 3% of the region where prograde orbits would be stable is occupied by satellites, and the region from Styx to Hydra is packed so tightly that there is little room for further moons with stable orbits within this region. An intense search conducted by New Horizons confirmed that no moons larger than 4.5 kilometres (2.8 mi) in diameter exist out to distances up to 180,000 kilometres (110,000 mi) from Pluto (6% of the stable region for prograde moons), assuming Charon-like albedoes of 0.38 (for smaller distances, this threshold is still smaller).

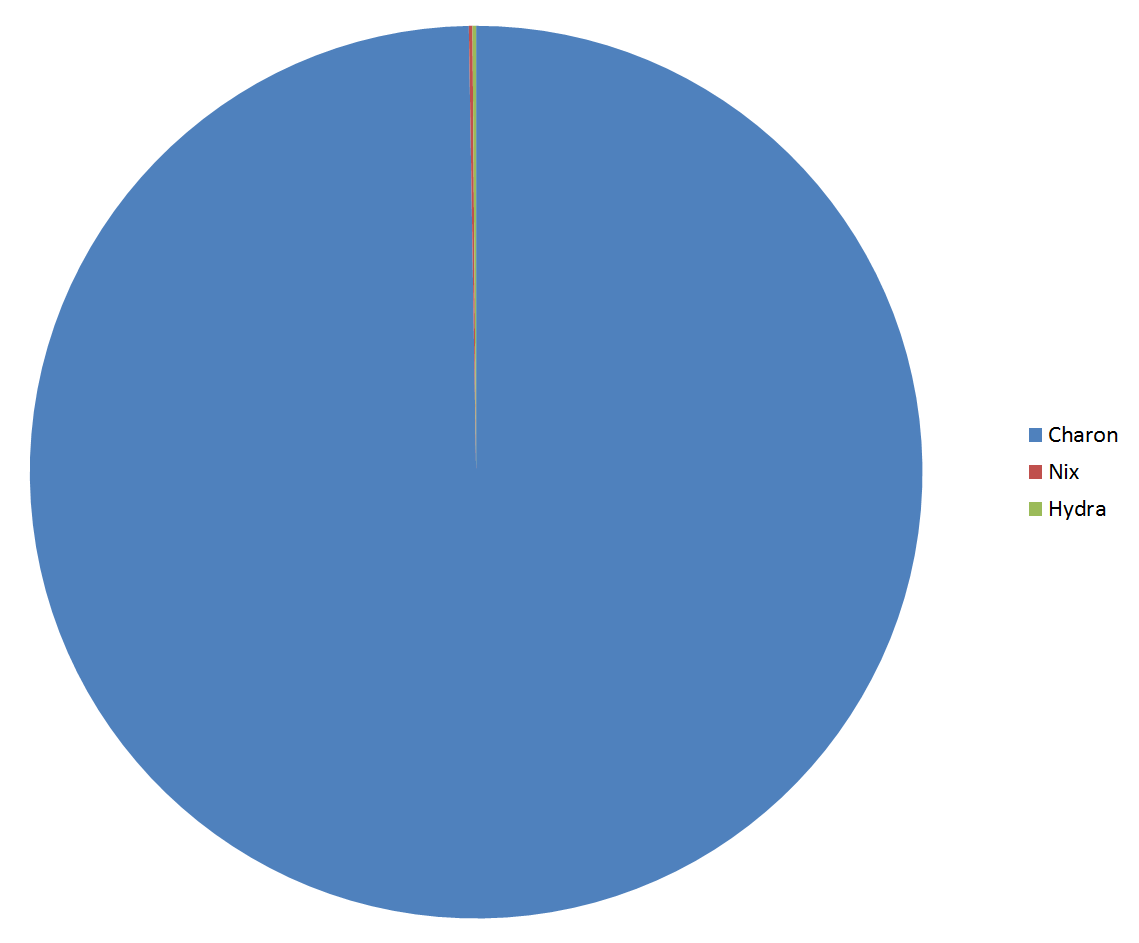
The relative masses of Pluto's moons. Charon dominates the system. Nix and Hydra are barely visible and Styx and Kerberos are invisible at this scale.

An oblique schematic view of the Pluto–Charon system showing that Pluto orbits a point outside itself. Also visible is the mutual tidal locking between the two bodies.

The orbits of the moons are confirmed to be circular and coplanar, with inclinations differing less than 0.4° and eccentricities less than 0.005.

The discovery of Nix and Hydra suggested that Pluto could have a ring system. Small-body impacts could eject debris off of the small moons which can form into a ring system. However, data from a deep-optical survey by the Advanced Camera for Surveys on the Hubble Space Telescope, by occultation studies, and later by New Horizons, suggest that no ring system is present.

=== Near resonances ===
All of the outer circumbinary moons are also close to mean motion resonance with the Charon–Pluto orbital period. Styx, Nix, Kerberos, and Hydra are in a 1:3:4:5:6 sequence of near resonances, with Styx approximately 5.4% from its resonance, Nix approximately 2.7%, Kerberos approximately 0.6%, and Hydra approximately 0.3%. It may be that these orbits originated as forced resonances when Charon was tidally boosted into its current synchronous orbit, and then released from resonance as Charon's orbital eccentricity was tidally damped. The Pluto–Charon pair creates strong tidal forces, with the gravitational field at the outer moons varying by 15% peak to peak.

However, it was calculated that a resonance with Charon could boost either Nix or Hydra into its current orbit, but not both: boosting Hydra would have required a near-zero Charonian eccentricity of 0.024, whereas boosting Nix would have required a larger eccentricity of at least 0.05. This suggests that Nix and Hydra were instead captured material, formed around Pluto–Charon, and migrated inward until they were trapped in resonance with Charon. The existence of Kerberos and Styx may support this idea.

=== Rotation ===
Rotations of the small moons of Pluto (animation; 01:00; released 10 November 2015)

Prior to the New Horizons mission, Nix, Hydra, Styx, and Kerberos were predicted to rotate chaotically or tumble.

However, New Horizons imaging found that they had not tidally spun down to near a spin synchronous state where chaotic rotation or tumbling would be expected. New Horizons imaging found that all 4 moons were at high obliquity. Either they were born that way, or they were tipped by a spin precession resonance. Styx may be experiencing intermittent and chaotic obliquity variations.

Mark R. Showalter had speculated that, "Nix can flip its entire pole. It could actually be possible to spend a day on Nix in which the sun rises in the east and sets in the north. It is almost random-looking in the way it rotates." Only one other moon, Saturn's moon Hyperion, is known to tumble, though it is likely that Haumea's moons do so as well.

== Origin ==
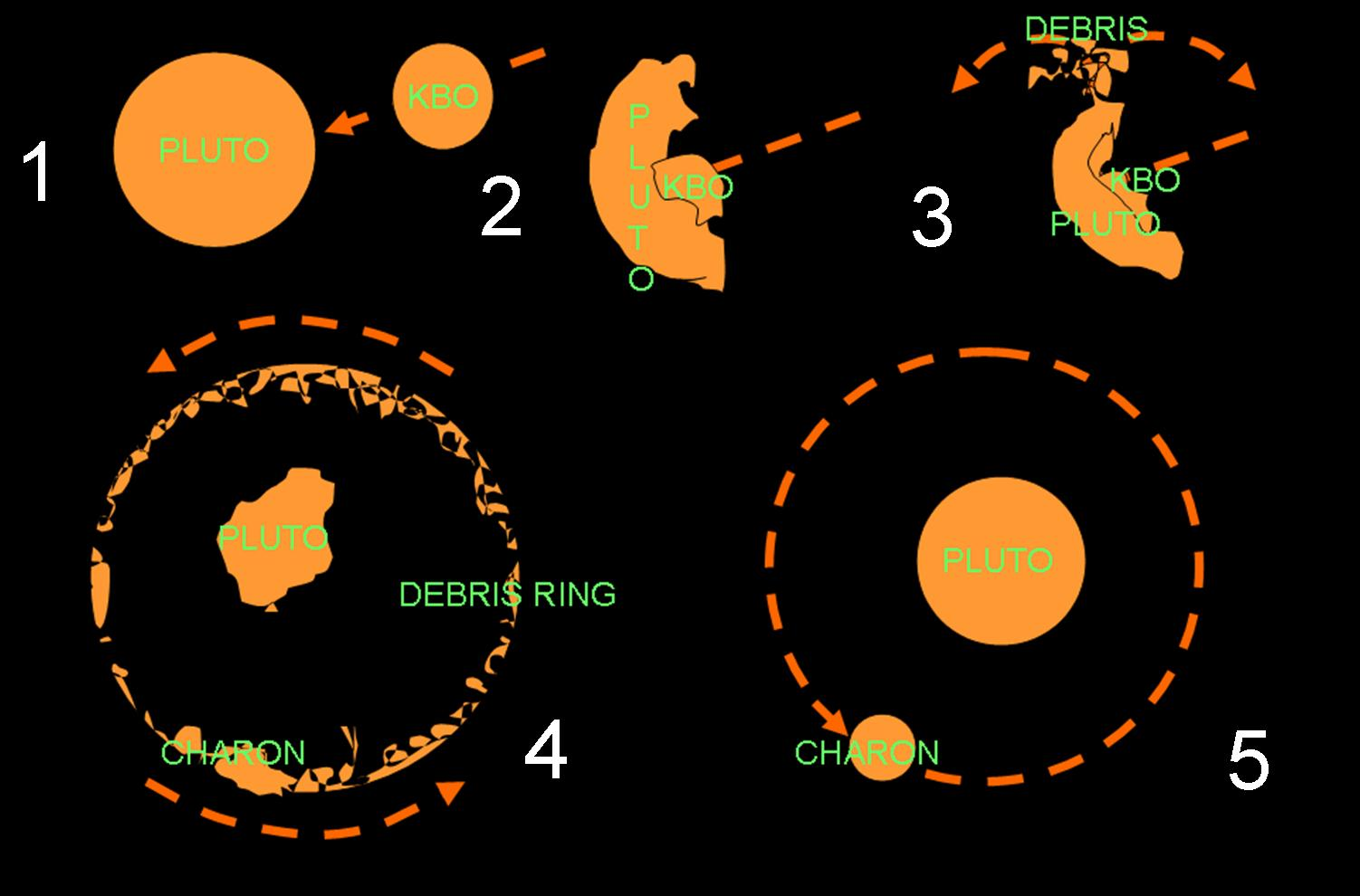
Formation of Pluto's moons. 1: a Kuiper belt object approaches Pluto; 2: it collides with Pluto; 3: a dust ring forms around Pluto; 4: the debris aggregates to form Charon; 5: Pluto and Charon relax into spherical bodies.

It is suspected that Pluto's satellite system was created by a massive collision, similar to the Theia impact thought to have created the Moon. In both cases, the high angular momenta of the moons can only be explained by such a scenario. The nearly circular orbits of the smaller moons suggests that they were also formed in this collision, rather than being captured Kuiper Belt objects. This and their near orbital resonances with Charon (see below) suggest that they formed closer to Pluto than they are at present and migrated outward as Charon reached its current orbit. Their grey color is different from that of Pluto, one of the reddest bodies in the Solar System. This is thought to be due to a loss of volatiles during the impact or subsequent coalescence, leaving the surfaces of the moons dominated by water ice. However, such an impact should have created additional debris (more moons), yet no moons or rings were discovered by New Horizons, ruling out any more moons of significant size orbiting Pluto. An alternative hypothesis is that the collision happened at about 3,200 kilometres per hour (2,000 mph), not powerful enough to destroy Charon and Pluto. Instead they remained attached to each other for up to ten hours before separating again. The faster rotation of Pluto back then, with one rotation every third hour, would have created a centrifugal force stronger than the gravitational attraction between the two bodies, which made Charon separate from Pluto, but remained gravitationally bound with each other. The same process could have created the four other known moons, from material that escaped Pluto and Charon.

== List of moons ==
Pluto's moons are listed here by orbital period, from shortest to longest. Charon, which is massive enough to have collapsed into a spheroid under its own gravitation, is highlighted in light purple. As the system barycenter lies far above Pluto's surface, Pluto's barycentric orbital elements have been included as well. All elements are with respect to the Pluto–Charon barycenter. The mean separation distance between the centers of Pluto and Charon is 19,596 km.

Label (Note: Label refers to the Roman numerals attributed to each moon in order of their discovery.)	Name (pronunciation)		Named after	Image	Diameter (km)	Mass (×10^{19} kg)	Semi-major axis (km)	Orbital period (days)	Orbital resonance (relative to Charon)	Eccentricity	Inclination (°) (to Pluto's equator)	Visual magnitude (mean)	Discovery year
	Pluto	/ˈpluːtoʊ/	Pluto, Roman god of the underworld		2376.6±3.2	1305±7	2035	6.38723	1 : 1	0.0022 (Note: Orbital eccentricity and inclination of Pluto and Charon are equal because they refer to the same two-body problem (the gravitational influence of the smaller satellites is neglected here).)	0.001	15.1	1930
I	Charon	/ˈʃærən/, (Note: Many astronomers use this, Christy's pronunciation, rather than the classical /ˈkɛərɒn/, but both are considered to be acceptable.) /ˈkɛərən/	Charon, ferryman of the underworld in Greek mythology		1212±1	158.7±1.5	17536±3	6.38723	1 : 1	0.0022	0.080	16.8	1978
V	Styx	/ˈstɪks/	The mythical river Styx and its eponymous goddess		16 × 9 × 8	0.00075	42656±78	20.16155	1 : 3.16	0.00579	0.81±0.16	27	2012
II	Nix	/ˈnɪks/	Egyptian spelling of Nyx, goddess of the night in Greek mythology		49.8 × 33.2 × 31.1	0.005±0.004	48694±3	24.85463	1 : 3.89	0.00204	0.133±0.008	23.7	2005
IV	Kerberos	/ˈkɜːrbərəs, -ɒs/	Greek spelling of Cerberus, the many-headed dog who guards the Greek underworld		19 × 10 × 9	0.0016±0.0009	57783±19	32.16756	1 : 5.04	0.00328	0.389±0.037	26	2011
III	Hydra	/ˈhaɪdrə/	The Hydra, the many-headed serpent who guards the Greek underworld		50.9 × 36.1 × 30.9	0.005±0.004	64738±3	38.20177	1 : 5.98	0.00586	0.242±0.005	23.3	2005

=== Scale model of the Pluto system ===
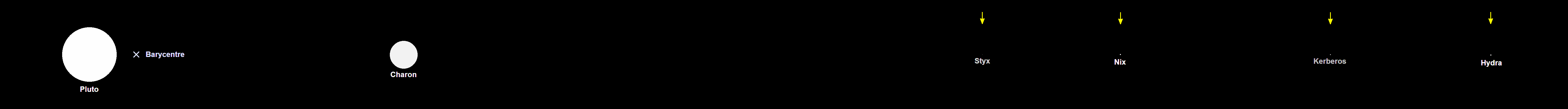
Pluto and its five moons, including the location of the system's barycenter. Sizes and distances of the bodies are to scale.

== Mutual events ==
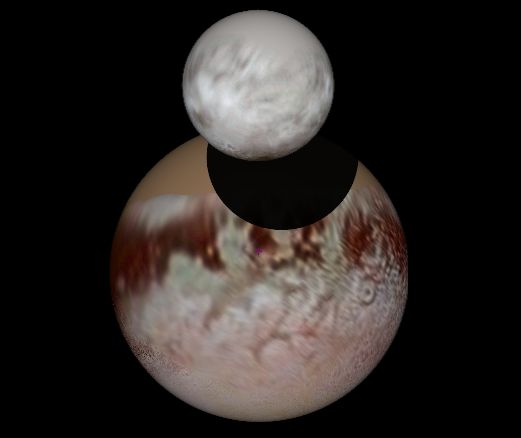
Simulated view of Charon transiting Pluto on 25 February 1989

Transits occur when one of Pluto's moons passes between Pluto and the Sun. This occurs when one of the satellites' orbital nodes (the points where their orbits cross Pluto's ecliptic) lines up with Pluto and the Sun. This can only occur at two points in Pluto's orbit; coincidentally, these points are near Pluto's perihelion and aphelion. Occultations occur when Pluto passes in front of and blocks one of Pluto's satellites.

Charon has an angular diameter of 4 degrees of arc as seen from the surface of Pluto; the Sun appears much smaller, only 39 to 65 arcseconds. By comparison, the Moon as viewed from Earth has an angular diameter of only 31 minutes of arc, or just over half a degree of arc. Therefore, Charon would appear to have eight times the diameter, or 64 times the area of the Moon; this is due to Charon's proximity to Pluto rather than size, as despite having just over one-third of a Lunar radius, Earth's Moon is 20 times more distant from Earth's surface as Charon is from Pluto's. This proximity further ensures that a large proportion of Pluto's surface can experience an eclipse. Because Pluto always presents the same face towards Charon due to tidal locking, only the Charon-facing hemisphere experiences solar eclipses by Charon.

The smaller moons can cast shadows elsewhere. The angular diameters of the four smaller moons (as seen from Pluto) are uncertain. Nix's is 3–9 minutes of arc and Hydra's is 2–7 minutes. These are much larger than the Sun's angular diameter, so total solar eclipses are caused by these moons.

Eclipses by Styx and Kerberos are more difficult to estimate, as both moons are very irregular, with angular dimensions of 76.9 x 38.5 to 77.8 x 38.9 arcseconds for Styx, and 67.6 x 32.0 to 68.0 x 32.2 for Kerberos. As such, Styx has no annular eclipses, its widest axis being more than 10 arcseconds larger than the Sun at its largest. However, Kerberos, although slightly larger, cannot make total eclipses as its largest minor axis is a mere 32 arcseconds. Eclipses by Kerberos and Styx will entirely consist of partial and hybrid eclipses, with total eclipses being extremely rare.

The next period of mutual events due to Charon will begin in October 2103, peak in 2110, and end in January 2117. During this period, solar eclipses will occur once each Plutonian day, with a maximum duration of 90 minutes.

== Exploration ==
The Pluto system was visited by the New Horizons spacecraft in July 2015. Images with resolutions of up to 330 meters (1,080 ft) per pixel were returned of Nix and up to 1.1 kilometres (0.68 mi) per pixel of Hydra. Lower-resolution images were returned of Styx and Kerberos.

== Sources ==
- Stern, S. A.; Weaver, H. A.; Steffl, A. J.; Mutchler, M. J.; Merline, W. J.; Buie, M. W.; Young, E. F.; Young, L. A.; Spencer, J. R. (2005). "Characteristics and Origin of the Quadruple System at Pluto". arXiv:astro-ph/0512599.
- Steffl, A. J.; Mutchler, M. J.; Weaver, H. A.; Stern, S. A.; Durda, D. D.; Terrell, D.; Merline, W. J.; Young, L. A.; Young, E. F.; Buie, M. W.; Spencer, J. R. (2006). "New Constraints on Additional Satellites of the Pluto System". The Astronomical Journal. 132 (2): 614–619. arXiv:astro-ph/0511837. Bibcode:2006AJ....132..614S. doi:10.1086/505424. S2CID 10547358.
- Buie, Marc W.; Grundy, William M.; Young, Eliot F.; Young, Leslie A.; Stern, S. Alan (2006). "Orbits and Photometry of Pluto's Satellites: Charon, S/2005 P1, and S/2005 P2". The Astronomical Journal. 132 (1): 290–298. arXiv:astro-ph/0512491. Bibcode:2006AJ....132..290B. doi:10.1086/504422. S2CID 119386667.
- Brozović, Marina; Showalter, Mark R.; Jacobson, Robert A.; Buie, Marc W. (2015). "The orbits and masses of satellites of Pluto". Icarus. 246: 317–329. Bibcode:2015Icar..246..317B. doi:10.1016/j.icarus.2014.03.015.
- Codex Regius (2016). Pluto & Charon. CreateSpace. ISBN 978-1-5349-6074-9.
- IAU Circular No. 8625, describing the discovery of 2005 P1 and P2
- IAU Circular No. 8686, reporting a more neutral color for 2005 P2
- IAU Circular No. 8723 announcing the names of Nix and Hydra
- Background Information Regarding Our Two Newly Discovered Satellites of Pluto – The website of the discoverers of Nix and Hydra
