= Pan (moon) =

Moon of Saturn

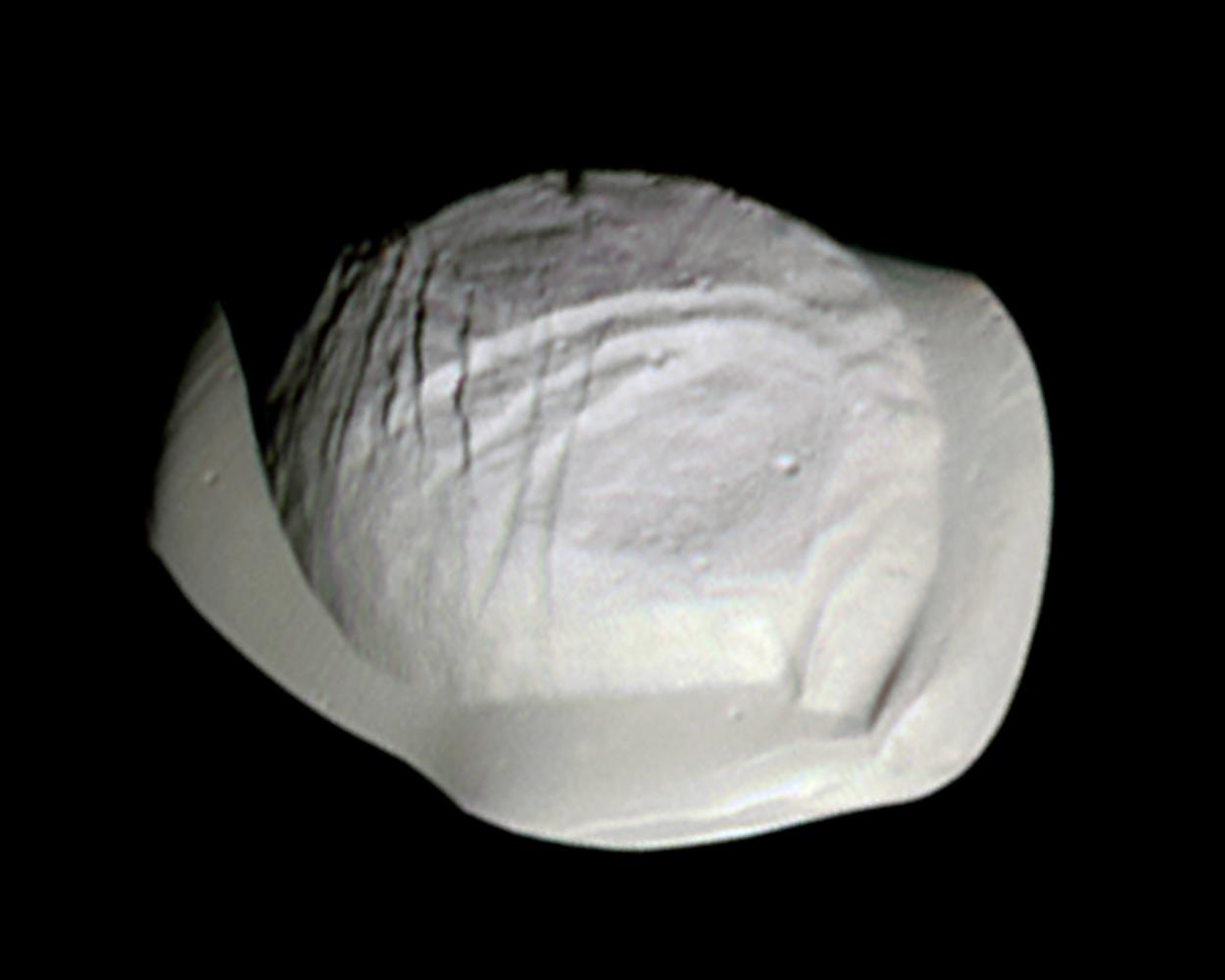
- False color photo of Pan by Cassini in March 2017 (Note: This color photo of Pan was created by combining separate photos taken in infrared, green, and ultraviolet spectral filters of the Cassini spacecraft's narrow-angle Imaging Science Subsystem (ISS) camera on 7 March 2017. This view of the moon's northern hemisphere shows its walnut-like appearance, with a highly inclined equatorial ridge almost eclipsing the moon's southern hemisphere from view.)

Discovery
- Discovered by: M. R. Showalter
- Discovery date: 16 July 1990

Designations
- Designation: Saturn XVIII
- Pronunciation: /ˈpæn/
- Named after: Πάν Pān
- Alternative names: S/1981 S 13
- Adjectives: Pandean /pænˈdiːən/

Orbital characteristics
- Epoch 2000 January 1.5
- Semi-major axis: 133584.0±0.1 km
- Eccentricity: 0.0000144±0.0000054
- Orbital period (sidereal): 0.575050718 d (13.801217 h)
- Inclination: 0.0001°±0.0004°
- Satellite of: Saturn

Physical characteristics
- Dimensions: 34.6 × 28.2 × 21.0 km (± 0.4 × 0.4 × 1.0 km)
- Mean diameter: 27.4±0.6 km
- Volume: 10748 km^{3}
- Mass: (4.30±0.22)×10^{15} kg
- Mean density: 0.400±0.031 g/cm^{3}
- Surface gravity: 0.0111–0.0169 m/s^{2}
- Escape velocity: 0.006 km/s at longest axis to 0.007 km/s at poles
- Synodic rotation period: synchronous
- Axial tilt: assumed zero
- Albedo: 0.86±0.07 (geometric)
- Temperature: ≈ 78 K

Pan is the innermost named moon of Saturn. It is approximately 35 kilometres (22 mi) across and 23 km (14 mi) wide and orbits within the Encke Gap in Saturn's A Ring. Pan is a ring shepherd and is responsible for keeping the Encke Gap free of ring particles. It is sometimes described as having the appearance of a walnut, or ravioli.

Pan was discovered by Mark R. Showalter in 1990 from analysis of old Voyager 2 probe photos and received the provisional designation S/1981 S 13 because the discovery images dated back to 1981.

== Discovery and naming ==
=== Prediction ===
The existence of a moon in the Encke Gap was first predicted by Jeffrey N. Cuzzi and Jeffrey D. Scargle in 1985, based on wavy edges of the gap which indicated a gravitational disturbance. In 1986, Showalter et al. inferred its orbit and mass by modeling its gravitational wake. They arrived at a precise prediction of 133,603 ± 10 km for the semi-major axis and a mass of 5–10×10^{−12} Saturn masses, and inferred that there was only a single moon within the Encke gap. The actual semi-major axis differs by 19 km, and the actual mass is 8.6×10^{−12} of Saturn's.

The moon was later found within 1° of the predicted position. The search was undertaken by considering all Voyager 2 images and using a computer calculation to predict whether the moon would be visible under sufficiently favorable conditions in each one. Every qualifying Voyager 2 image with a resolution better than ~50 km/pixel shows Pan clearly. In all, it appears in eleven Voyager 2 images.

=== Name ===
The moon was named on 16 September 1991 after the mythological Greek god named Pan, who was (among other things) the god of shepherds. This is a reference to Pan's role as a shepherd moon. It is also designated Saturn XVIII.

== Orbit ==
The eccentricity of Pan's orbit causes its distance from Saturn to vary by ~4 km. Its inclination, which would cause it to move up and down, is not distinguishable from zero with present data. The Encke Gap, within which Pan orbits, is about 322 km wide.

The Encke Gap contains a ringlet that is coincident with Pan's orbit, indicating that Pan maintains the particles in horseshoe orbits. A second ringlet is periodically disrupted by Pan, similarly to how the F Ring is disturbed by Prometheus.

== Physical characteristics ==
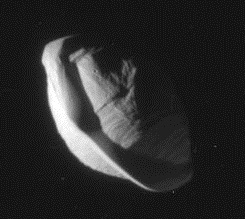
Pan, photographed by Cassini on March 7, 2017. The thin equatorial ridge is clearly visible.

Cassini scientists have described Pan as "walnut-shaped" owing to the equatorial ridge, similar to that on Atlas, that is visible in images. The ridge is due to ring material that Pan has swept up from the Encke gap. It has been referred to by journalists as a space empanada, a form of stuffed bread or pastry, as well as a ravioli. A new study suggests that the bizarre shape of Pan could also be due to collisions between tiny moonlets, thus causing them to merge and form Pan (known as the pyramidal regime formation scenario).

The equatorial ridge has a polygonal shape and is somewhat large, making up 10% of the total volume of the moon. It extends 10–20° from the equator, and there exists a sharp boundary between it and the core section. The ridge is generally smoother than the core, but there still exist some grooves and craters on it.

== Gallery ==
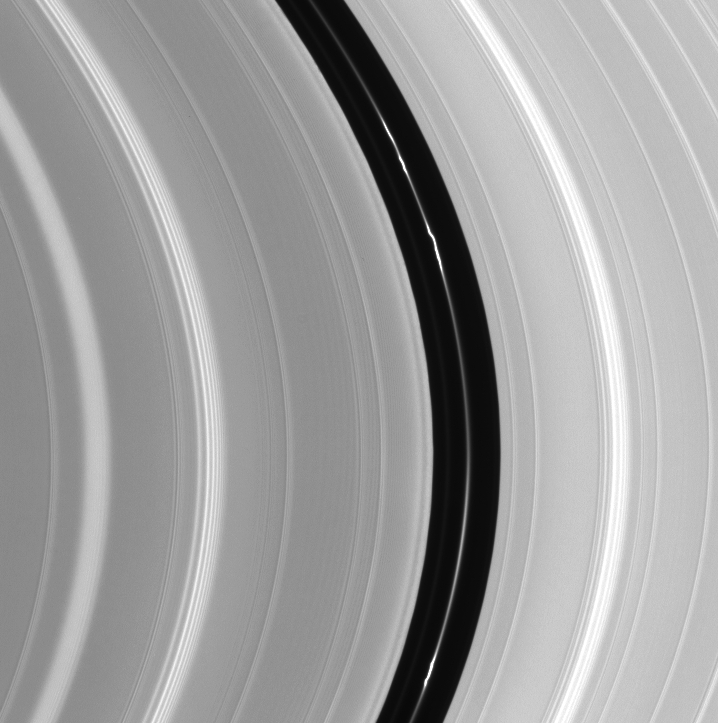
Closeup of the Encke Gap, showing the central ringlet that is coincident with Pan's orbit.

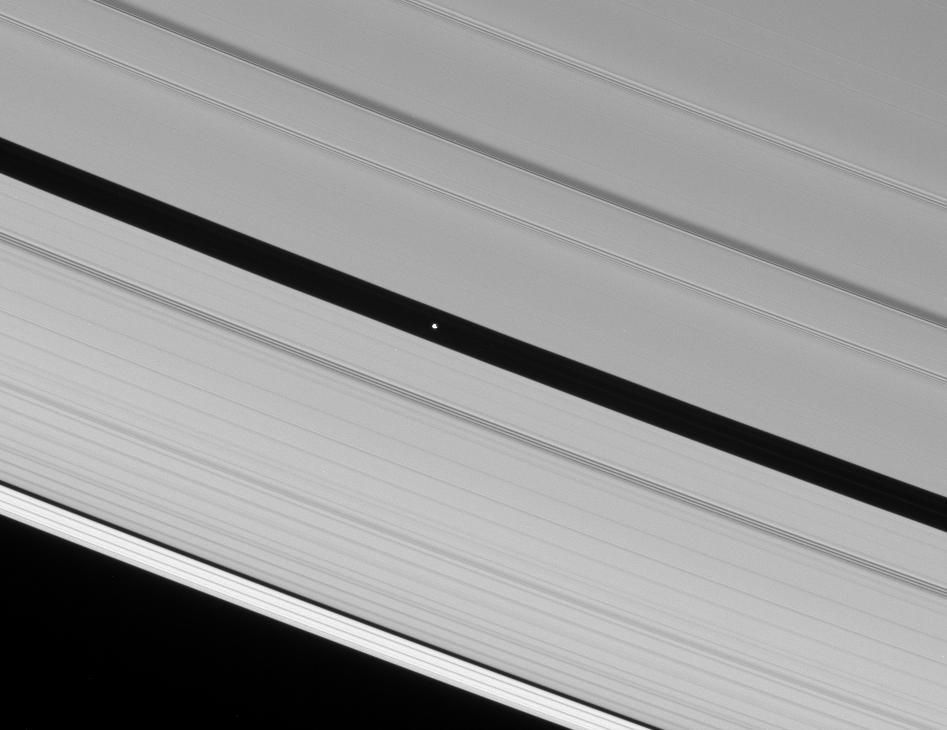
Cassini image showing Pan orbiting in the Encke Gap.

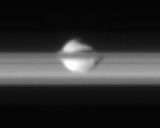
Equatorial view of Pan from Cassini, with the rings of Saturn surrounding the moon.

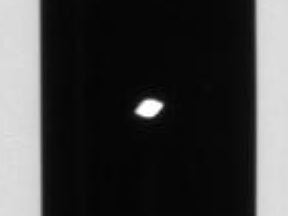
Pan in the center of the image, occupying the Encke Gap in Saturn's rings. Its walnut-like shape is clearly visible.

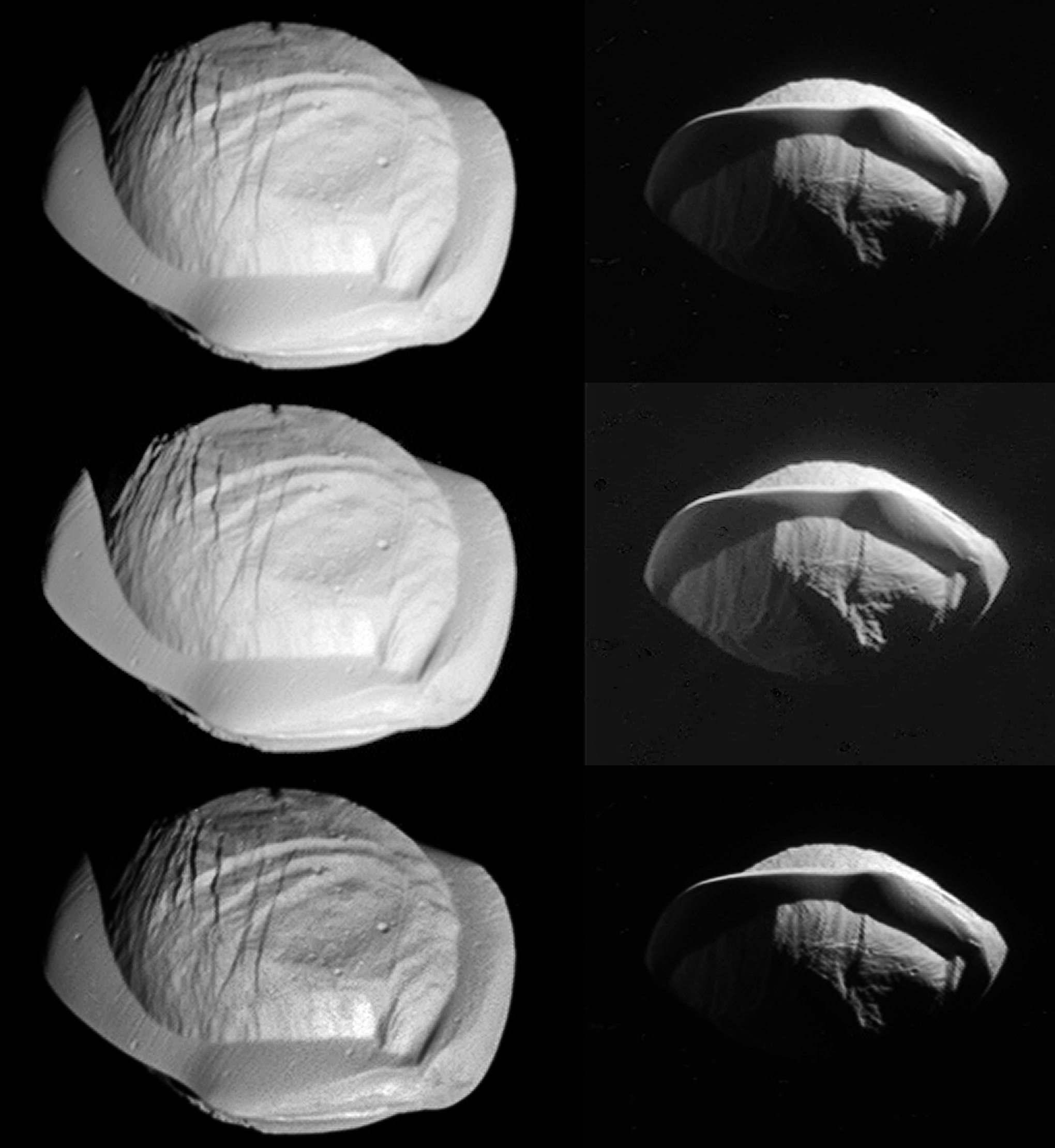
Stretched (4x) images, processed in various ways.

== See also ==
- List of natural satellites
