= Puck (moon) =

Moon of Uranus

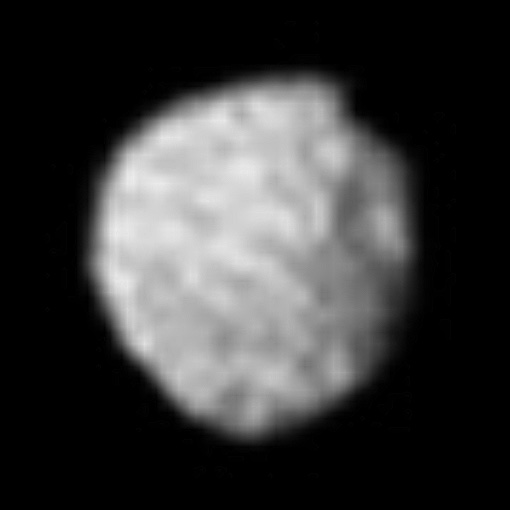
- Puck as imaged by Voyager 2 in January 1986. The image is centered on Puck's south pole. Despite the low resolution, several craters have been identified, including Bogle on the upper right

Discovery
- Discovered by: Stephen P. Synnott / Voyager 2
- Discovery date: December 30, 1985

Designations
- Designation: Uranus XV
- Pronunciation: /ˈpʌk/
- Adjectives: Puckian

Orbital characteristics
- Periapsis: 85995 km
- Apoapsis: 86013 km
- Semi-major axis: 86004 km
- Eccentricity: 0.0001
- Orbital period (sidereal): 0.761833 d
- Average orbital speed: 8.21 km/s (Note: Calculated on the basis of other parameters.)
- Inclination: 0.327° (to Uranus's equator)
- Satellite of: Uranus

Physical characteristics
- Dimensions: 81 × 81 × 81 km
- Mean radius: 81±2 km
- Surface area: (8.2±0.4)×10^{4} km^{2}
- Volume: 2226100 km^{3} ± 7.8%
- Mass: (2.0035±0.1568)×10^{18} kg
- Mean density: 0.5–1.2 g/cm^{3} 0.9 g/cm^{3} (assumed)
- Surface gravity: ~0.020 m/s^{2}
- Escape velocity: ~0.057 km/s
- Synodic rotation period: presumed synchronous
- Axial tilt: assumed zero
- Albedo: 0.99–0.108 (geometric) (Note: For the leading and trailing hemispheres respectively.); 0.035±0.006 (Bond) (Note: Measured at 0.55 μm.)
- Apparent magnitude: 19.75 ± 0.05
- Absolute magnitude (H): 7.04 ± 0.05

Puck is the sixth-largest moon of Uranus, and its largest inner moon. It was discovered in December 1985 by the Voyager 2 spacecraft. Following the convention of naming Uranus's moons after characters from Shakespeare's literary works, its name was taken from A Midsummer Night's Dream.

The orbit of Puck lies between the rings of Uranus and the first of Uranus's large moons, Miranda. Puck is approximately spherical in shape and has diameter of about 162 km (101 mi). It has a dark, heavily cratered surface, which shows spectral signs of water ice.

== Discovery and naming ==
Of the moons discovered by the Voyager 2 imaging team, only Puck was discovered early enough that the probe could be programmed to image it in some detail. Puck was discovered from the images Voyager 2 took on 30 December 1985. It was given the temporary designation S/1985 U 1.

The moon was later named after the character Puck who appears in Shakespeare's A Midsummer Night's Dream, a little sprite who travels around the globe at night with the fairies. In Celtic mythology and English folklore, a Puck is a mischievous sprite, imagined as an evil demon by Christians.

It is also designated Uranus XV.

== Physical characteristics ==
Map of Puck

With a radius of about 81 km (50 mi), Puck is the largest inner moon of Uranus, orbiting inside the orbit of Miranda. It is intermediate in size between Portia (the second-largest inner moon) and Miranda (the smallest of the five major moons). One of the images taken by Voyager 2 had high enough resolution to constrain its shape in all three dimensions, which revealed that Puck has a shape consistent within errors to being a sphere. The ratio between its equatorial axes a/b is 0.93–1, and the polar axis c is at least 95% of b.

Its surface is heavily cratered and is grey in color. There are three named craters on the surface of Puck, the largest being about 45 km (28 mi) in diameter. It has a relatively dark geometric albedo in visible light of approximately 10%. It is about 10 or 15% brighter on its trailing hemisphere than its leading hemisphere. Observations with the Hubble Space Telescope and large terrestrial telescopes found water-ice absorption features in the spectrum of Puck.

Puck's orbit is located between the rings of Uranus and Miranda. Its surface is coated with a dark material similar to that found in the main rings. The dark material is probably made of rocks or radiation-processed organics; it is possible that material spiralling inwards from Uranus's μ ring coats Puck's leading hemisphere as well.

Little is known about the internal structure of Puck. It is probably made of a mixture of water ice and rocks, and may have been collisionally disrupted and reaccreted as a rubble pile. The presence of a 3.0 deep 3.0 micron feature attributed to the O-H stretching mode suggests that water ice or hydrated minerals are a common component on Puck's surface. Puck, as well as the other inner satellites of Uranus, is darker than the average inner Neptunian satellite, which could be either due to a higher level of solar irradiation at Uranus as opposed to Neptune, or a distinct composition. The absence of craters with bright rays implies that Puck is not differentiated, meaning that ice and non-ice components have not separated from each other into a core and mantle.

=== Named features ===
Puck has three craters named Bogle, Butz, and Lob, which are named after mischievous spirits from Scottish, German, and British folklore respectively. Details about these craters are currently unknown.

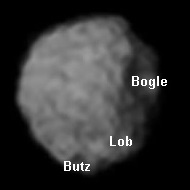
Named craters on Puck

Crater	Coordinates	Diameter (km)	Approval date	Named after	Ref
Bogle	—	~47 km	1988	Bogle (Celtic)	WGPSN
Butz	—	—	1988	Butz (German)	WGPSN
Lob	—	—	1988	Lob (English)	WGPSN

== See also ==
- Moons of Uranus
- Rings of Uranus
