= Kerberos (moon) =

Small natural satellite of Pluto

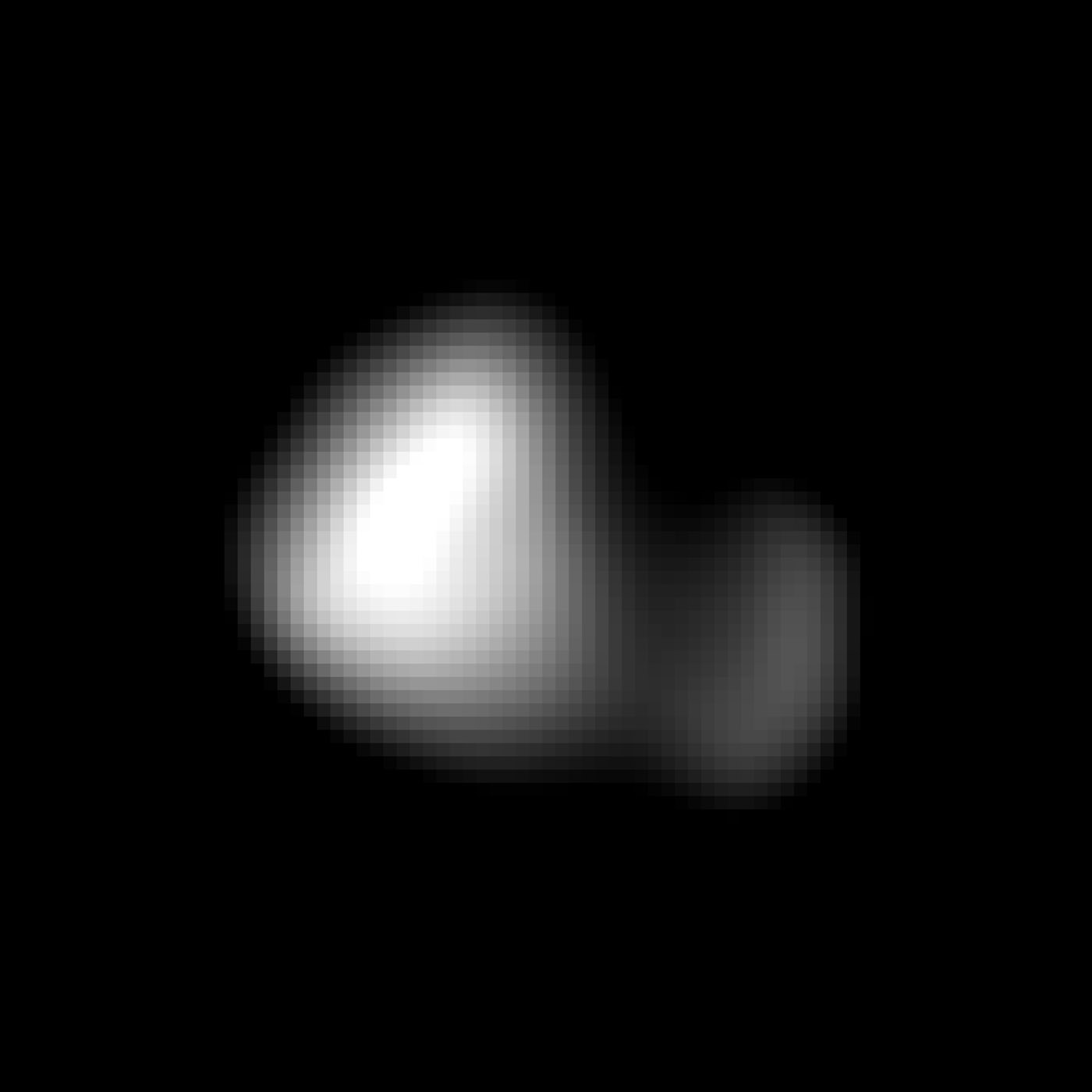
- Kerberos imaged by New Horizons on 14 July 2015 from a distance of 396,100 km

Discovery
- Discovered by: Showalter, M. R. et al.
- Discovery date: 28 June 2011 (verified 20 July 2011)

Designations
- Designation: Pluto IV
- Pronunciation: /ˈkɜːrbərɒs, -əs/
- Named after: Κέρβερος Kerberos
- Alternative names: S/2011 (134340) 1 S/2011 P 1
- Adjectives: Kerberean /kɜːrˈbɪəriən/

Orbital characteristics
- Semi-major axis: 57783±19 km
- Eccentricity: 0.00328 ± 0.00020
- Orbital period (sidereal): 32.16756±0.00014 d
- Inclination: 0.389°±0.037°
- Satellite of: Pluto

Physical characteristics
- Dimensions: 19 × 10 × 9 km
- Mass: 1.65×10^{16} kg (Note: Derived from the published value of GM_{Kerberos} = 0.0011±0.0006 km^{3}/s^{2} and the relationship M_{Kerberos} = GM_{Kerberos}/G)
- Synodic rotation period: 5.31 ± 0.10 d (chaotic)
- Axial tilt: 96°
- Albedo: 0.56 ± 0.05
- Apparent magnitude: 26.1±0.3

Kerberos, formal designation (134340) Pluto IV, is a small natural satellite of Pluto, about 19 km (12 mi) in its longest dimension. Kerberos is also the second-smallest moon of Pluto, after Styx. It was the fourth moon of Pluto to be discovered and its existence was announced on 20 July 2011. It was imaged, along with Pluto and its four other moons, by the New Horizons spacecraft in July 2015. The first image of Kerberos from the flyby was released to the public on 22 October 2015.

== Discovery ==
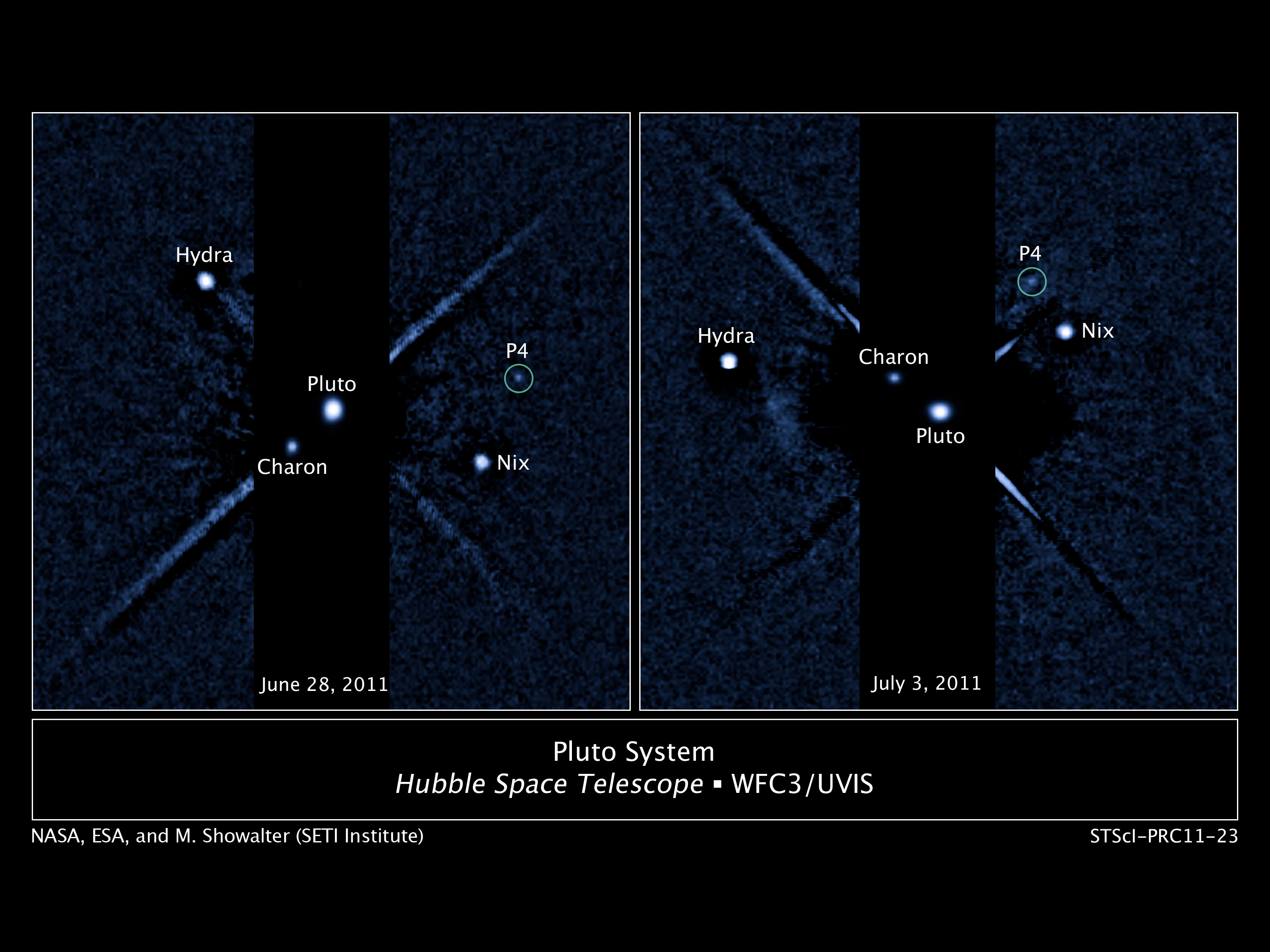
Hubble discovery images of Kerberos

Kerberos was discovered by researchers of the Pluto Companion Search Team using the Hubble Space Telescope on 28 June 2011, using the Wide Field Camera 3, during an attempt to find any rings that Pluto might possess. The search for rings was motivated in part by a desire to avoid damage to New Horizons when it passed through the Pluto system in July 2015. Further observations were made on 3 and 18 July 2011 and Kerberos was verified as a new moon on 20 July 2011. It was later precovered or identified in earlier archival Hubble images from 15 February 2006 and 25 June 2010, though Kerberos was obscured by diffraction spikes in those images. Kerberos's brightness is only about 10% of that of Nix, and it was only found because the discovery team took eight-minute exposures; earlier observations had used shorter exposures. It was officially designated S/2011 (134340) 1, and was informally referred to as P4.

== Origin ==
Like Pluto's other moons, it is suspected that Kerberos coalesced from the debris of a massive collision between Pluto and another Kuiper belt object, similar to the giant impact thought to have created the Moon.

== Physical characteristics ==
Kerberos has a double-lobed shape and is approximately 19 km (12 mi) across its longest dimension and 9 km (5.6 mi) across its shortest dimension. It is the second-smallest of Pluto's moons, after Styx. The larger lobe of Kerberos is approximately 8 km (5 mi) across while the smaller lobe is measured to be approximately 5 km (3.1 mi) across. The double-lobed shape of Kerberos is likely due to the merger of two smaller objects, making Kerberos a contact binary. This also suggests that Kerberos along with Pluto's other moons may have been formed by the coalescence of debris around Pluto.

Kerberos has a high albedo or reflectivity similar to Pluto's other small moons, likely due to the presence of water ice on its surface. Before the New Horizons flyby, Kerberos was initially thought to have a larger size and a darker surface.

=== Rotation ===
Like the other small moons of Pluto, Kerberos is not tidally locked and its rotation is chaotic, varying quickly over geological timescales. The varying gravitational influences of Pluto and Charon as they orbit their barycenter causes the chaotic tumbling of Pluto's small moons, including Kerberos. At the time of the New Horizons flyby, the rotational period of Kerberos was about 5.33 days and its rotational axis was tilted about 96 degrees to its orbit. The high axial tilt of Kerberos meant that it was rotating sideways relative to its orbit around the Pluto–Charon barycenter.

== Orbit ==
Animation of moons of Pluto around the barycenter of Pluto – Ecliptic plane

Front view

Side view

Pluto · Charon · Styx · Nix · Kerberos · Hydra

Observations indicate a circular, equatorial orbit around the Pluto–Charon barycenter at a distance of 57,783 km (35,905 mi). All of Pluto's moons including Kerberos have very circular orbits with very low orbital inclinations to Pluto's equator. Kerberos orbits between Nix and Hydra and makes a complete orbit around Pluto roughly every 32.167 days.

Its orbital period is close to a 1:5 orbital resonance with Charon, with the timing discrepancy being about 0.7%. (Note: $(P_K - 5*P_C)/P_K = 0.0072$ where $P_K=32.16756\,d$ is Kerberos's period and $P_C = 6.3872304\,d$ is Charon's period.) As with the near resonances between Nix or Hydra and Charon (1:4 and 1:6, respectively), determining how close this relationship is to a true resonance will require more-accurate knowledge of Kerberos's orbit, in particular its rate of precession.

== Exploration ==
The New Horizons spacecraft took images of Kerberos during its flyby of the Pluto system on 14 July 2015. Three months later, on 22 October, the first image of the moon was published. It is the last moon of Pluto to have its image released, revealing that Kerberos was small and had a bright surface contrary to the initial idea that the moon was covered in dark material.

== Naming ==
Upon discovery, Kerberos received the minor planet designation S/2011 (134340) 1 because it was the first satellite (S) discovered orbiting the minor planet 134340 Pluto in 2011. It was initially called "P4", indicating that it was the fourth Plutonian moon to be discovered. The convention for naming Plutonian moons is to use names associated with the god Pluto in classical mythology. To decide on names for P4 and P5, Mark Showalter and the SETI Institute, on behalf of the discovery team, conducted a non-binding Internet poll in 2013, in which the general public was invited to vote for their favorite names. The public could choose from a selection of Greek mythological names related to the god Pluto, or could propose their own names. After the initial announcement, William Shatner, the actor who played Captain James T. Kirk in the Star Trek franchise, proposed the names Vulcan and Romulus, ostensibly referring to the fire god Vulcan (a nephew of Pluto), and to Romulus the founder of Rome, but also alluding to the fictional planets of Vulcan and Romulus in the Star Trek universe. The "Romulus" suggestion was discounted, because there is already an asteroid moon of that name, but Vulcan won the poll after Shatner tweeted about it, with Cerberus (the dog that guards Pluto's underworld) coming second and Styx (the goddess of the river of the underworld) coming third. The winning names were submitted to the International Astronomical Union. However, "Vulcan" was unacceptable to the IAU because it was not the name of an underworld deity and had already been used for a hypothetical planet inside the orbit of Mercury, as well as having given its name to the hypothetical vulcanoids. "Cerberus" is already the name of an asteroid, 1865 Cerberus, but the Greek form of the name, "Kerberos", was acceptable to the IAU.

On 2 July 2013, the IAU announced that it formally approved the names Kerberos for P4 and Styx for P5.

The names of features on the bodies in the Pluto system are related to mythology and the literature and history of exploration. In particular, the names of features on Kerberos must be related to dogs from literature, mythology, and history.

The provisional designation of the satellite varies based on the source used. The International Astronomical Union announced it as S/2011 (134340) 1, whereas the New Horizons mission website announced it as S/2011 P 1.

== See also ==
- List of natural satellites
