= Mark R. Showalter =

American research scientist (born 1957)

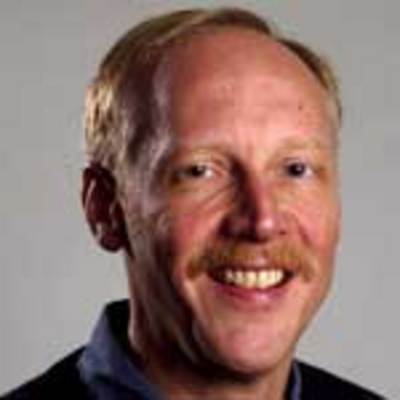
- Born: Mark Robert Showalter; December 5, 1957 (age 68); Abington, Pennsylvania, U.S.
- Education: Oberlin College (B.A.); Cornell University (M.Sc.), (Ph.D.)
- Known for: Discoverer or co-discoverer of Jovian gossamer ring, Saturnian moon Pan, Uranian moons Mab and Cupid, Uranian rings μ and ν, Neptunian moon Hippocamp, Plutonian moons Kerberos and Styx
- Spouse: Frank Yellin
- Scientific career
- Fields: Astronomy, astrophysics, space science, planetary science
- Workplaces: SETI Institute

Mark Robert Showalter (born December 5, 1957) is an American senior research scientist at the SETI Institute. He is the discoverer of six moons and three planetary rings. He is the Principal Investigator of NASA's Planetary Data System Rings Node, a co-investigator on the Cassini–Huygens mission to Saturn, and works closely with the New Horizons mission to Pluto.

== Biography ==
Showalter was born in Abington, Pennsylvania. He enjoyed playing with science-themed toys while a child, and later mowed lawns as a teenager so that he might purchase a telescope in high school. He received a Bachelor of Arts in physics and mathematics from Oberlin College in 1979. He was initially undecided about pursuing a career in astronomy after his undergraduate education, but made up his mind after seeing the images of Jupiter sent back to Earth by Voyager 2.

Showalter received his MS in astronomy from Cornell University in 1982, and his PhD from Cornell in 1985. His thesis was on Jupiter's ring system, in which he discovered the gossamer ring of Jupiter. (Note: At the time of discovery, the gossamer ring was thought to be a single ring. Later observations have resolved the gossamer ring into two separate, overlapping rings: the Thebe gossamer ring and the Amalthea gossamer ring.)

In 1990, using ten-year-old Voyager data, Showalter discovered Pan, the eighteenth and innermost moon of Saturn. It orbits within and keeps open the Encke Gap in Saturn's rings via shepherding.

In 2003, Showalter and Jack J. Lissauer discovered two new moons of Uranus (Mab and Cupid) in Hubble Space Telescope images. In 2006, they announced the discovery of two very faint rings, the μ and ν rings, within the same data.

In 2010, Showalter discovered that spiral vertical corrugations in Jupiter's rings were caused by the impact of Comet Shoemaker–Levy 9 in July 1994. A second smaller set of corrugations appear to be consistent with an unknown impact in early 1990. He and co-researchers also found similar spiral patterns in Saturn's D Ring.

Showalter has assisted the New Horizons team in determining what hazards the spacecraft would encounter as it flew close to Pluto. A search for faint dust rings of Pluto using the Hubble Space Telescope in 2011 led to the discovery of the fourth moon Kerberos. Working with the New Horizons team, Showalter found the fifth moon Styx in July 2012.

On July 15, 2013, a team of astronomers led by Showalter discovered a previously unknown fourteenth moon of Neptune in images taken by the Hubble Space Telescope from 2004 to 2009. Unnamed at that time, Hippocamp is thought to measure around 34.8 km in diameter.

Showalter was the 2021 recipient of the Harold Masursky Award for Meritorious Service to Planetary Science.

The Mars-crossing asteroid 18499 Showalter is named after Dr. Showalter.

== Personal life ==
Showalter is an avid scuba diver and photographer. He is married to Frank Yellin; they live in California.
