= Moons of Jupiter =

Natural satellites of the planet Jupiter

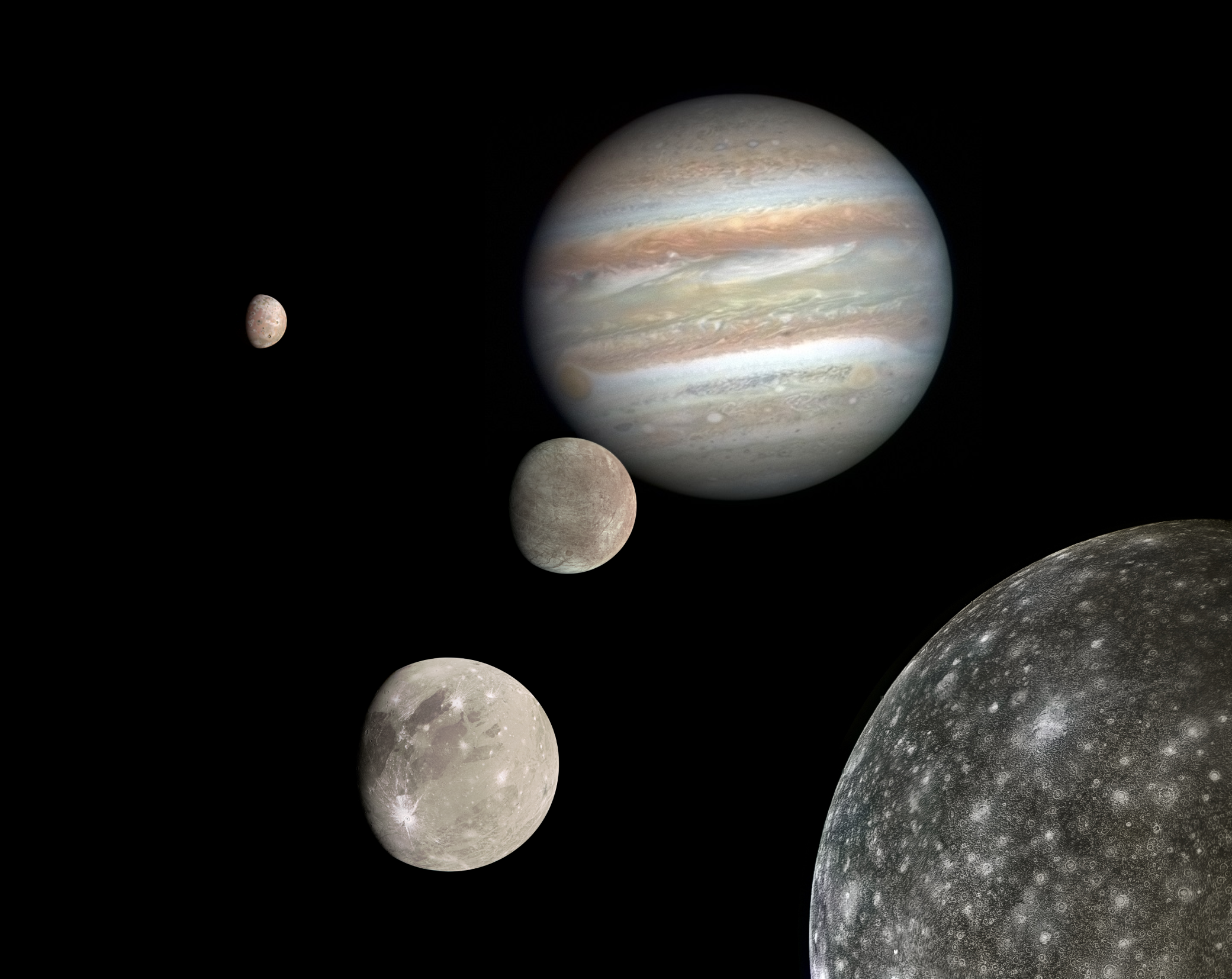
A montage of Jupiter and its four largest moons (distance and sizes not to scale)

There are 115 known moons of the planet Jupiter as of 9 April 2026. This number does not include a number of meter-sized moonlets thought to be shed from the inner moons, nor hundreds of possible kilometer-sized outer irregular moons that were only briefly captured by telescopes. All together, Jupiter's moons form a satellite system, colloquially referred to as the Jovian system. The most massive of the moons are the four Galilean moons: Io, Europa, Ganymede, and Callisto, all of which were independently discovered in 1610 by Galileo Galilei and Simon Marius and were the first objects found to orbit a body that was neither Earth nor the Sun. Much more recently, beginning in 1892, dozens of far smaller Jovian moons have been detected and have received the names of lovers (or other sexual partners) or daughters of the Roman god Jupiter or his Greek equivalent Zeus. The Galilean moons are by far the largest and most massive objects to orbit Jupiter, with the remaining 111 known moons and the rings together comprising just 0.003% of the total orbiting mass.

Of Jupiter's moons, eight are regular satellites with prograde and nearly circular orbits that are not greatly inclined with respect to Jupiter's equatorial plane. The Galilean satellites are nearly spherical in shape due to their planetary mass, and are just massive enough that they would be considered planets if they were in direct orbit around the Sun. The other four regular satellites, known as the inner moons, are much smaller and closer to Jupiter; these serve as sources of the dust that makes up Jupiter's rings. The remainder of Jupiter's moons are outer irregular satellites whose prograde and retrograde orbits are much farther from Jupiter and have high inclinations and eccentricities. The largest of these moons were likely asteroids that were captured from solar orbits by Jupiter before impacts with other small bodies shattered them into many kilometer-sized fragments, forming collisional families of moons sharing similar orbits. Jupiter is expected to have about 100 irregular moons larger than 1 km (0.6 mi) in diameter, plus around 500 more smaller retrograde moons down to diameters of 0.8 km (0.5 mi). Of the 107 known irregular moons of Jupiter, 58 of them have not yet been officially given names.

== Characteristics ==
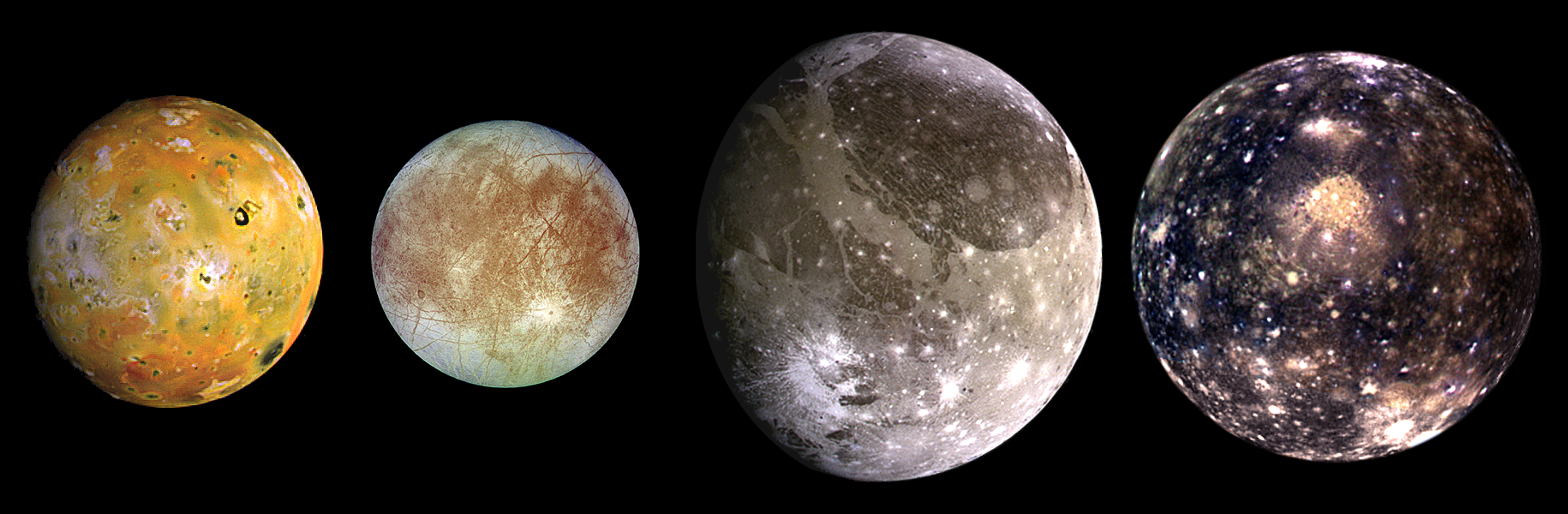
The Galilean moons. From left to right, in order of increasing distance from Jupiter: Io, Europa, Ganymede, and Callisto.

The physical and orbital characteristics of the moons vary widely. The four Galileans are all over 3,100 kilometres (1,900 mi) in diameter; the largest Galilean, Ganymede, is the ninth largest object in the Solar System, after the Sun and seven of the planets, Ganymede being larger than Mercury. All other Jovian moons are less than 250 kilometres (160 mi) in diameter, with most barely exceeding 5 kilometres (3.1 mi). (Note: For comparison, the area of a sphere with diameter 250 km is about the area of Senegal and comparable to the area of Belarus, Syria and Uruguay. The area of a sphere with a diameter of 5 km is about the area of Guernsey and somewhat more than the area of San Marino. (But note that these smaller moons are not spherical.)) Their orbital shapes range from nearly perfectly circular to highly eccentric and inclined, and many revolve in the direction opposite to Jupiter's rotation (retrograde motion).

== Formation ==
=== Regular satellites ===
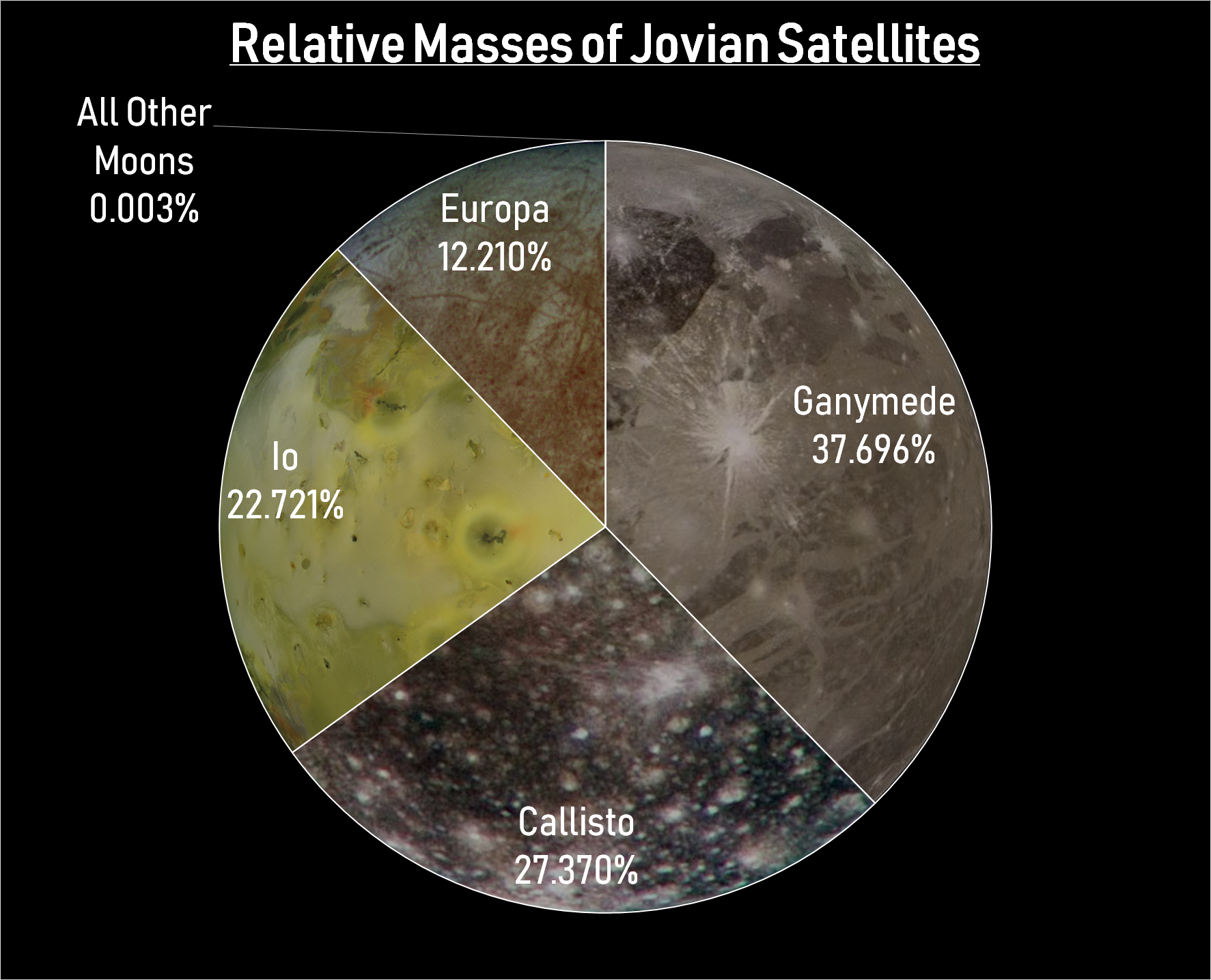
The relative masses of the Jovian moons. Those smaller than Europa are not visible at this scale, and combined would only be visible at 100× magnification.

Jupiter's regular satellites are thought to have formed from a circumplanetary disk, a ring of gravitated gas and solid debris analogous to a protoplanetary disk. They may be the remnants of a score of Galilean-mass satellites that formed early in Jupiter's history.

Simulations suggest that, while the disk had a relatively high mass at any given moment, over time a substantial fraction (several tenths of a percent) of the mass of Jupiter captured from the solar nebula was passed through it. However, only 2% of the proto-disk mass of Jupiter is required to explain the existing satellites. Thus, several generations of Galilean-mass satellites may have been in Jupiter's early history. Each generation of moons might have spiraled into Jupiter, because of drag from the disk, with new moons then forming from the new debris captured from the solar nebula. By the time the present (possibly fifth) generation formed, the disk had thinned so that it no longer greatly interfered with the moons' orbits. The current Galilean moons were still affected, falling into and being partially protected by an orbital resonance with each other, which still exists for Io, Europa, and Ganymede: they are in a 1:2:4 resonance. Ganymede's larger mass means that it would have migrated inward at a faster rate than Europa or Io. Tidal dissipation in the Jovian system is still ongoing and Callisto will likely be captured into the resonance in about 1.5 billion years, creating a 1:2:4:8 chain.

=== Irregular satellites ===
The outer, irregular moons are thought to have originated from captured asteroids, whereas the proto-lunar disk was still massive enough to absorb much of their momentum and thus capture them into orbit. Many are believed to have been broken up by mechanical stresses during capture, or afterward by collisions with other small bodies, producing the moons we see today.

The formation of the Ananke and Carme groups was likely via a collision with a passing planetesimal, as opposed to a moon-moon impact. Due to their longer orbital periods and greater distances from Jupiter, collisions are rare among the retrograde satellites. Numerical integrations show the expected number of collisions in the past 4.5 billion years among all retrograde moons combined is around 1, which is probably not common enough to have produced the families. The impactors of the parent objects produced large craters, but were not large enough to catastrophically disrupt the progenitors, as the largest fragments still have 96% and 99% of the mass of the parent body, for the Ananke and Carme groups respectively. The impactors' diameters are required to be 0.53 km and 0.59 km; planetesimals of that size were very common early in the Solar System's formation. However, a moon-moon collisional origin is still plausible if the number of retrograde irregular moons around Jupiter was much more numerous in the past.

On the other hand, the Himalia group is unlikely to have formed from an impact with a passing planetesimal, it probably formed from a moon-moon collision instead. The parent body split into much more massive fragments proportionally; the largest fragment comprises only 78% of the mass of the parent body. Combined with the large assumed diameter of 150 km, this requires a more energetic impact, with an impactor of diameter ~13 km, so planetesimals large enough were probably too uncommon. Unlike the retrograde moons of Jupiter, prograde moons are expected to have been involved in numerous collisions. There is a high probability of collisions among the members of the prograde moons of Jupiter during the lifespan of the Solar System (e.g. on average 1.5 collisions between Himalia and Elara). In addition, the same simulations have shown fairly high probabilities of collisions between prograde and retrograde satellites (e.g. Pasiphae and Himalia have a 27% probability of collision within 4.5 gigayears). The fact that prograde moons are involved in collisions at a relatively common rate even in the present day suggests that the Himalia group could potentially have formed more recently, and likely did so from a moon-moon collision.

== History and discovery ==
=== Visual observations ===
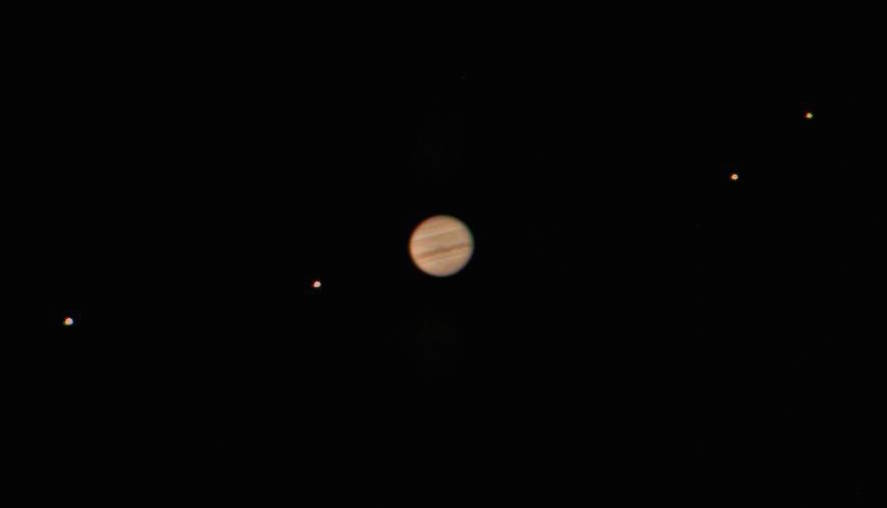
Jupiter and the Galilean moons as seen through a 25 cm (10 in) Meade LX200 telescope

Chinese historian Xi Zezong claimed that the earliest record of a Jovian moon (Ganymede or Callisto) was a note by Chinese astronomer Gan De of an observation around 364 BC regarding a "reddish star". However, the first certain observations of Jupiter's satellites were those of Galileo Galilei in 1609. By January 1610, he had sighted the four massive Galilean moons with his 20× magnification telescope, and he published his results in March 1610.

Simon Marius had independently discovered the moons one day after Galileo, although he did not publish his book on the subject until 1614. Even so, the names Marius assigned are used today: Ganymede, Callisto, Io, and Europa. No additional satellites were discovered until E. E. Barnard observed Amalthea in 1892.

=== Photographic and spacecraft observations ===
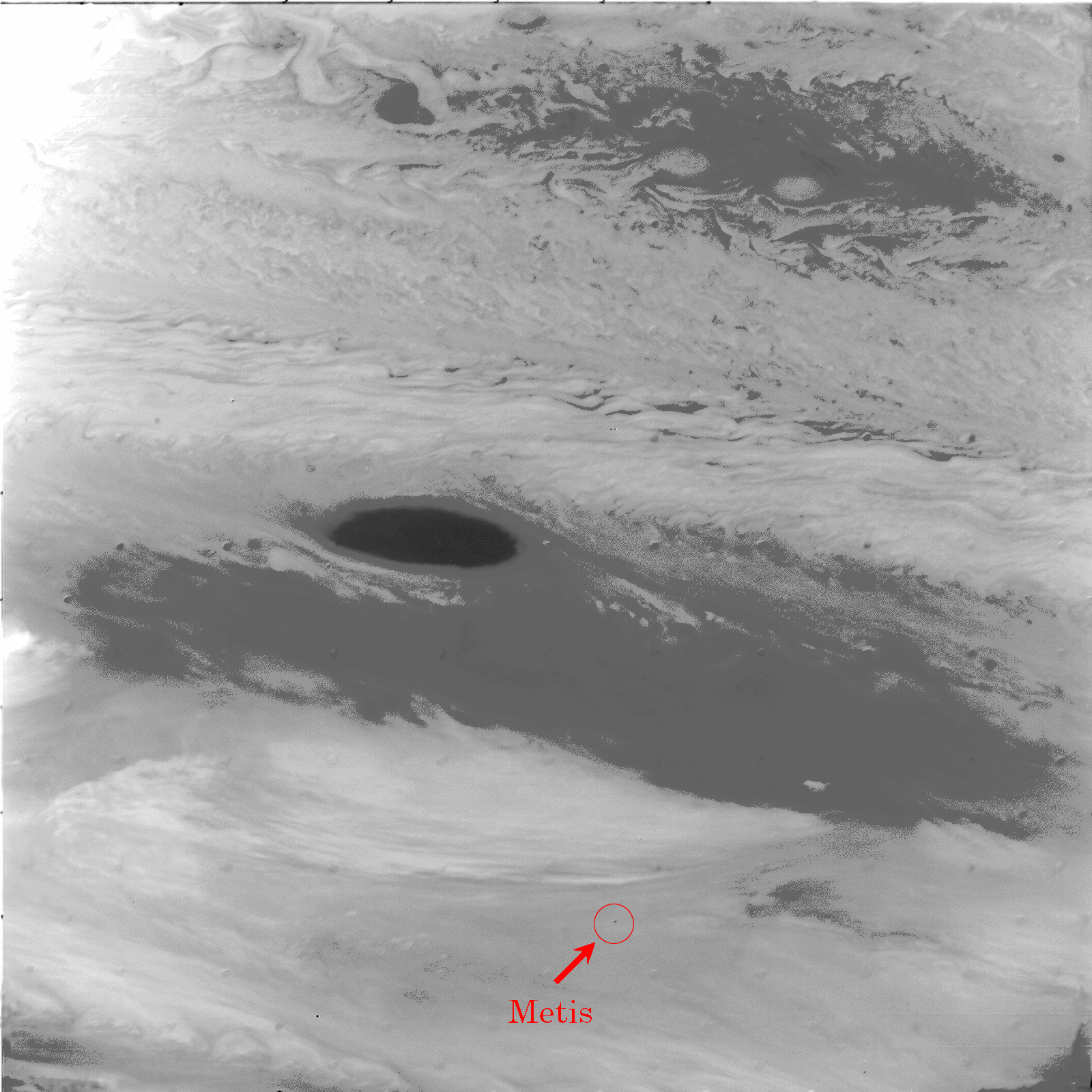
Voyager 1 discovery image of the inner moon Metis from 4 March 1979, showing the moon's tiny silhouette against the backdrop of Jupiter's clouds

With the aid of telescopic photography with photographic plates, further discoveries followed quickly over the course of the 20th century. Himalia was discovered in 1904, Elara in 1905, Pasiphae in 1908, Sinope in 1914, Lysithea and Carme in 1938, Ananke in 1951, and Leda in 1974.

By the time that the Voyager space probes reached Jupiter, around 1979, thirteen moons had been discovered, not including Themisto, which had been observed in 1975, but was lost until 2000 due to insufficient initial observation data. The Voyager spacecraft discovered an additional three inner moons in 1979: Metis, Adrastea, and Thebe.

=== Digital telescopic observations ===
No additional moons were discovered until two decades later, with the fortuitous discovery of Callirrhoe by the Spacewatch survey in October 1999. During the 1990s, photographic plates phased out as digital charge-coupled device (CCD) cameras began emerging in telescopes on Earth, allowing for wide-field surveys of the sky at unprecedented sensitivities and ushering in a wave of new moon discoveries. Scott Sheppard, then a graduate student of David Jewitt, demonstrated this extended capability of CCD cameras in a survey conducted with the Mauna Kea Observatory's 2.2-meter (88 in) UH88 telescope in November 2000, discovering eleven new irregular moons of Jupiter including the previously lost Themisto with the aid of automated computer algorithms.

From 2001 onward, Sheppard and Jewitt alongside other collaborators continued surveying for Jovian irregular moons with the 3.6-meter (12 ft) Canada–France–Hawaii Telescope (CFHT), discovering an additional eleven in December 2001, one in October 2002, and nineteen in February 2003. At the same time, another independent team led by Brett J. Gladman also used the CFHT in 2003 to search for Jovian irregular moons, discovering four and co-discovering two with Sheppard. From the start to end of these CCD-based surveys in 2000–2004, Jupiter's known moon count had grown from 17 to 63. All of these moons discovered after 2000 are faint and tiny, with apparent magnitudes between 22–23 and diameters less than 10 km (6.2 mi). As a result, many could not be reliably tracked and ended up becoming lost.

Beginning in 2009, a team of astronomers, namely Mike Alexandersen, Marina Brozović, Brett Gladman, Robert Jacobson, and Christian Veillet, began a campaign to recover Jupiter's lost irregular moons using the CFHT and Palomar Observatory's 5.1-meter (17 ft) Hale Telescope. They discovered two previously unknown Jovian irregular moons during recovery efforts in September 2010, prompting further follow-up observations to confirm these by 2011. One of these moons, S/2010 J 2 (now Jupiter LII), has an apparent magnitude of 24 and a diameter of only 1–2 km (0.62–1.2 mi), making it one of the faintest and smallest confirmed moons of Jupiter even as of 2023. Meanwhile, in September 2011, Scott Sheppard, now a faculty member of the Carnegie Institution for Science, discovered two more irregular moons using the institution's 6.5-meter (21 ft) Magellan Telescopes at Las Campanas Observatory, raising Jupiter's known moon count to 67. Although Sheppard's two moons were followed up and confirmed by 2012, both became lost due to insufficient observational coverage.

In 2016, while surveying for distant trans-Neptunian objects with the Magellan Telescopes, Sheppard enticingly observed a region of the sky located near Jupiter, enticing him to search for Jovian irregular moons as a detour. In collaboration with Chadwick Trujillo and David Tholen, Sheppard continued surveying around Jupiter from 2016 to 2018 using the Cerro Tololo Observatory's 4.0-meter (13 ft) Víctor M. Blanco Telescope and Mauna Kea Observatory's 8.2-meter (27 ft) Subaru Telescope. In the process, Sheppard's team recovered several lost moons of Jupiter from 2003 to 2011 and reported two new Jovian irregular moons in June 2017. Then in July 2018, Sheppard's team announced ten more irregular moons confirmed from 2016 to 2018 observations, bringing Jupiter's known moon count to 79. Among these was Valetudo, which has an unusually distant prograde orbit that crosses paths with the retrograde irregular moons. Several more unidentified Jovian irregular satellites were detected in Sheppard's 2016–2018 search, but were too faint for follow-up confirmation.

From November 2021 to January 2023, Sheppard discovered thirteen more irregular moons of Jupiter and confirmed them in archival survey imagery from 2003 to 2018, bringing the total count to 92. Among these was S/2018 J 4, a highly inclined prograde moon that is now known to be in same orbital grouping as the moon Carpo, which was previously thought to be solitary. On 22 February 2023, Sheppard announced three more moons discovered in a 2022 survey, now bringing Jupiter's total known moon count to 95. In a February 2023 interview with NPR, Sheppard noted that he and his team are currently tracking even more moons of Jupiter, which should place Jupiter's moon count over 100 once confirmed over the next two years. On 30 April 2025, the Minor Planet Center announced two additional moons of Jupiter, bringing the count to 97. In 2026, the Minor Planet Center announced four moons of Jupiter on March 16 and an additional fourteen more on April 9, bringing the count to 115.

Many more irregular moons of Jupiter will inevitably be discovered in the future, especially after the beginning of deep sky surveys by the Vera C. Rubin Observatory and Nancy Grace Roman Space Telescope in the mid-2020s. The Rubin Observatory's 8.4-meter (28 ft) aperture telescope and 3.5 square-degree field of view will probe Jupiter's irregular moons down to diameters of 1 km (0.6 mi) at apparent magnitudes of 24.5, with the potential of increasing the known population by up to tenfold. Likewise, the Roman Space Telescope's 2.4-meter (7.9 ft) aperture and 0.28 square-degree field of view will probe Jupiter's irregular moons down to diameters of 0.3 km (0.2 mi) at magnitude 27.7, with the potential of discovering approximately 1,000 Jovian moons above this size. Discovering these many irregular satellites will help reveal their population's size distribution and impact histories, which will place further constraints to how the Solar System formed.

== Naming ==
Galilean moons around Jupiter Jupiter · Io · Europa · Ganymede · Callisto

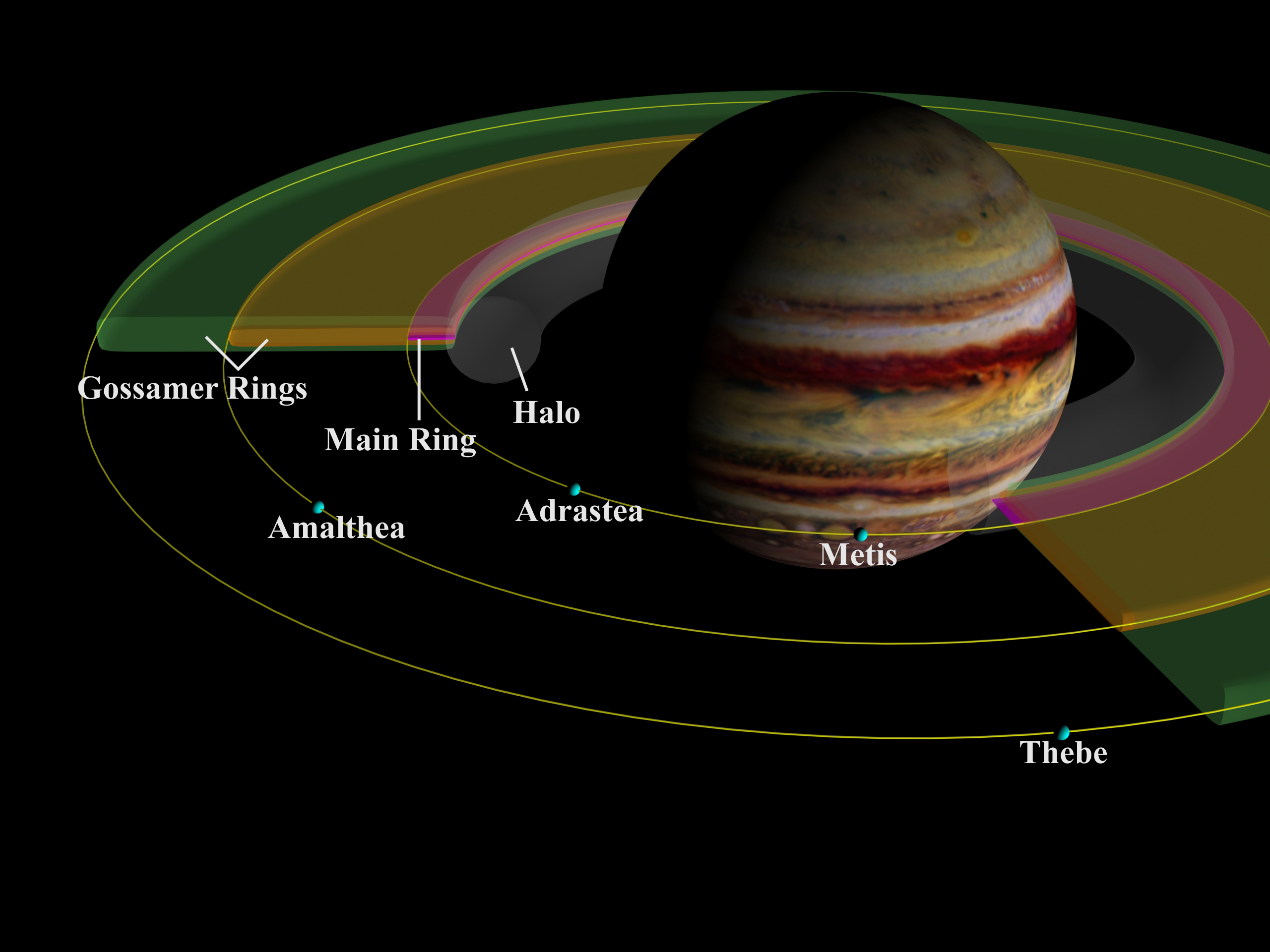
Orbits of Jupiter's inner moons within its rings

The Galilean moons of Jupiter (Io, Europa, Ganymede, and Callisto) were named by Simon Marius soon after their discovery in 1610. However, these names fell out of favor until the 20th century. The astronomical literature instead simply referred to "Jupiter I", "Jupiter II", etc., or "the first satellite of Jupiter", "Jupiter's second satellite", and so on. The names Io, Europa, Ganymede, and Callisto became popular in the mid-20th century, whereas the rest of the moons remained unnamed and were usually numbered in Roman numerals V (5) to XII (12). Jupiter V was discovered in 1892 and given the name Amalthea by a popular though unofficial convention, a name first used by French astronomer Camille Flammarion.

The other moons were simply labeled by their Roman numeral (e.g. Jupiter IX) in the majority of astronomical literature until the 1970s. Several different suggestions were made for names of Jupiter's outer satellites, but none were universally accepted until 1975 when the International Astronomical Union's (IAU) Task Group for Outer Solar System Nomenclature granted names to satellites V–XIII, and provided for a formal naming process for future satellites still to be discovered. The practice was to name newly discovered moons of Jupiter after lovers and favorites of the god Jupiter (Zeus) and, since 2004, also after their descendants. All of Jupiter's satellites from XXXIV (Euporie) onward are named after descendants of Jupiter or Zeus, except LIII (Dia), named after a lover of Jupiter. Names ending with "a" or "o" are used for prograde irregular satellites (the latter for highly inclined satellites), and names ending with "e" are used for retrograde irregulars. With the discovery of smaller, kilometre-sized moons around Jupiter, the IAU has established an additional convention to limit the naming of small moons with absolute magnitudes greater than 18 or diameters smaller than 1 km (0.6 mi). Some of the most recently confirmed moons have not received names.

== Groups ==
=== Regular satellites ===
These have prograde and nearly circular orbits of low inclination and are split into two groups:

- Inner satellites or Amalthea group: Metis, Adrastea, Amalthea, and Thebe. These orbit very close to Jupiter; the innermost two orbit in less than a Jovian day. The latter two are respectively the fifth and seventh largest moons in the Jovian system. Observations suggest that at least the largest member, Amalthea, did not form on its present orbit, but farther from the planet, or that it is a captured Solar System body. These moons, along with a number of seen and as-yet-unseen inner moonlets (see Amalthea moonlets), replenish and maintain Jupiter's faint ring system. Metis and Adrastea help to maintain Jupiter's main ring, whereas Amalthea and Thebe each maintain their own faint outer rings.
- Main group or Galilean moons: Io, Europa, Ganymede and Callisto. They are some of the largest objects in the Solar System outside the Sun and the eight planets in terms of mass, larger than any known dwarf planet. Ganymede exceeds (and Callisto nearly equals) even the planet Mercury in diameter, though they are less massive. They are respectively the fourth-, sixth-, first-, and third-largest natural satellites in the Solar System, containing approximately 99.997% of the total mass in orbit around Jupiter, while Jupiter is almost 5,000 times more massive than the Galilean moons. (Note: Jupiter Mass of 1.8986 × 10^{27} kg / Mass of Galilean moons 3.93 × 10^{23} kg = 4,828) The inner moons are in a 1:2:4 orbital resonance. Models suggest that they formed by slow accretion in the low-density Jovian subnebula—a disc of the gas and dust that existed around Jupiter after its formation—which lasted up to 10 million years in the case of Callisto. Europa, Ganymede, and Callisto are suspected of having subsurface water oceans, and Io may have a subsurface magma ocean.

=== Irregular satellites ===
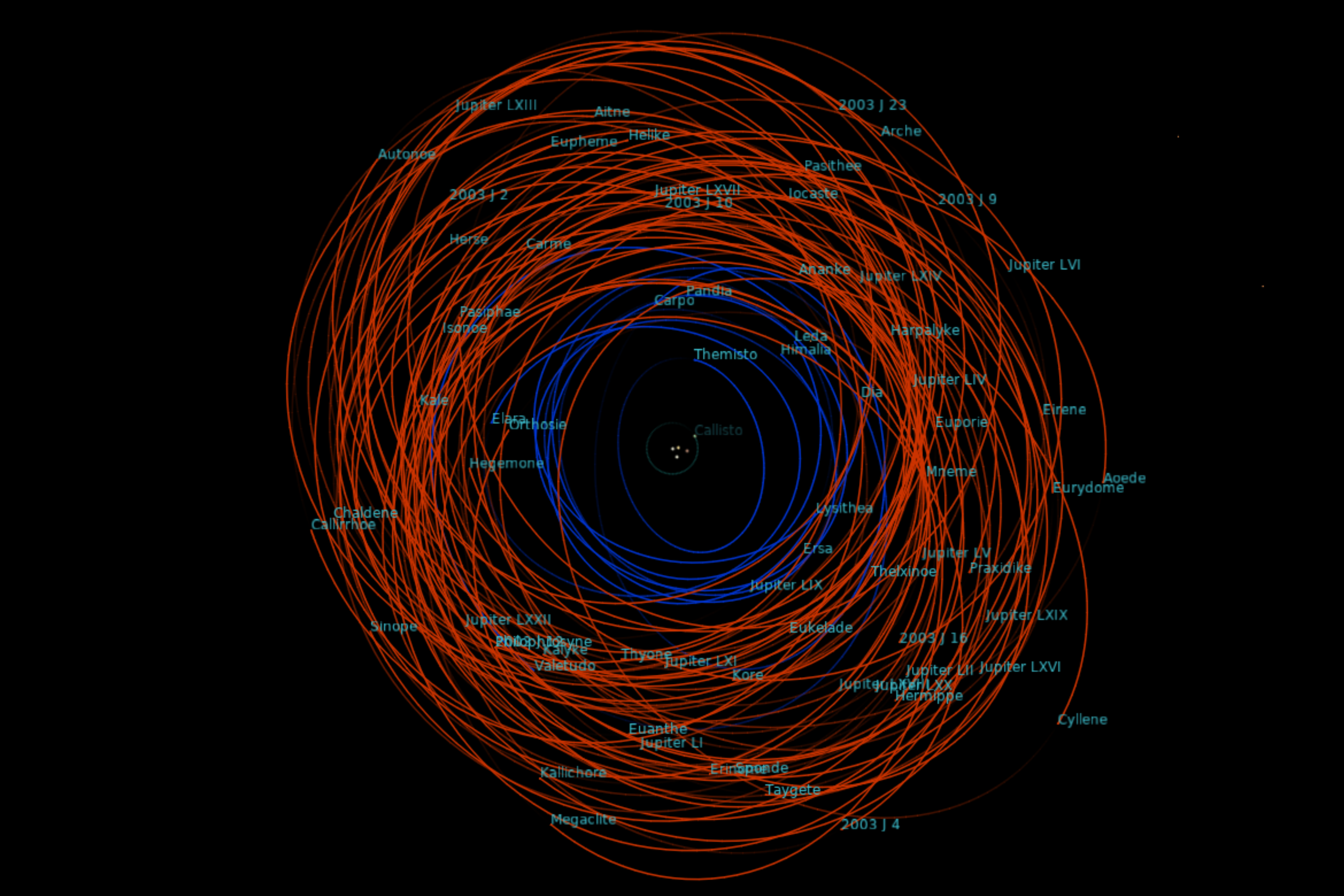
Orbits and positions of Jupiter's irregular satellites as of 1 January 2021. Prograde orbits are colored blue while retrograde orbits are colored red.

107 irregular moons of Jupiter plotted by semi-major axis and inclination as of April 2026.

The irregular satellites are substantially smaller objects with more distant and eccentric orbits. They form families with shared similarities in orbit (semi-major axis, inclination, eccentricity) and composition; it is believed that these are at least partially collisional families that were created when larger (but still small) parent bodies were shattered by impacts from asteroids captured by Jupiter's gravitational field. These families bear the names of their largest members. The identification of satellite families is tentative, but the following are typically listed:

- Prograde satellites:
  - Themisto is the innermost irregular moon and is not part of a known family.
  - The Himalia group is confined within semi-major axes between 11–13 million km (6.8–8.1 million mi), inclinations between 27 and 30°, and eccentricities between 0.11 and 0.24. It has been suggested that the group could be a remnant of the break-up of an asteroid from the asteroid belt. The largest two members, Himalia and Elara, are respectively the sixth- and eighth-largest Jovian moons.
  - The Carpo group includes two known moons on very high orbital inclinations of over 50° and semi-major axes between 16–18 million km (9.9–11.2 million mi). Due to their exceptionally high inclinations, the moons of the Carpo group are subject to gravitational perturbations that induce the Lidov–Kozai resonance in their orbits, which cause their eccentricities and inclinations to periodically oscillate in correspondence with each other. The Lidov–Kozai resonance can significantly alter the orbits of these moons: for example, the eccentricity and inclination of the group's namesake Carpo can fluctuate between 0.19–0.69 and 44–59°, respectively.
  - Valetudo is the outermost prograde moon and is not part of a known family. Its prograde orbit crosses paths with several moons that have retrograde orbits and may in the future collide with them.
- Retrograde satellites:
  - The Carme group is tightly confined within semi-major axes between 22.7–23.5 million km (14.1–14.6 million mi), inclinations between 164.3 and 164.9°, and eccentricities between 0.24 and 0.28. It is very homogeneous in color (light red) and is believed to have originated as collisional fragments from a D-type asteroid progenitor, possibly a Jupiter trojan.
  - The Ananke group has a relatively wider spread than the previous groups, with semi-major axes between 19–22 million km (12–14 million mi), inclinations between 144 and 156°, and eccentricities between 0.10 and 0.30. Most of the members appear gray, and are believed to have formed from the breakup of a captured asteroid.
  - The Pasiphae group is quite dispersed, with semi-major axes spread over 22–25 million km (14–16 million mi), inclinations between 141° and 158°, and higher eccentricities between 0.22 and 0.44. The colors also vary significantly, from red to grey, which might be the result of multiple collisions. Sinope, sometimes included in the Pasiphae group, is red and, given the difference in inclination, it could have been captured independently; Pasiphae and Sinope are also trapped in secular resonances with Jupiter.

Based on their survey discoveries in 2000–2003, Sheppard and Jewitt predicted that Jupiter should have approximately 100 irregular satellites larger than 1 km (0.6 mi) in diameter, or brighter than magnitude 24. Survey observations by Alexandersen et al. in 2010–2011 agreed with this prediction, estimating that approximately 40 Jovian irregular satellites of this size remained undiscovered in 2012.

In September 2020, researchers from the University of British Columbia identified 45 candidate irregular moons from an analysis of archival images taken in 2010 by the CFHT. These candidates were mainly small and faint, down to magnitude of 25.7 or above 0.8 km (0.5 mi) in diameter. From the number of candidate moons detected within a sky area of one square degree, the team extrapolated that the population of retrograde Jovian moons brighter than magnitude 25.7 is around 600+600
−300 within a factor of 2. Although the team considers their characterized candidates to be likely moons of Jupiter, they all remain unconfirmed due to insufficient observation data for determining reliable orbits. The true population of Jovian irregular moons is likely complete down to magnitude 23.2 at diameters over 3 km (1.9 mi) as of 2020.

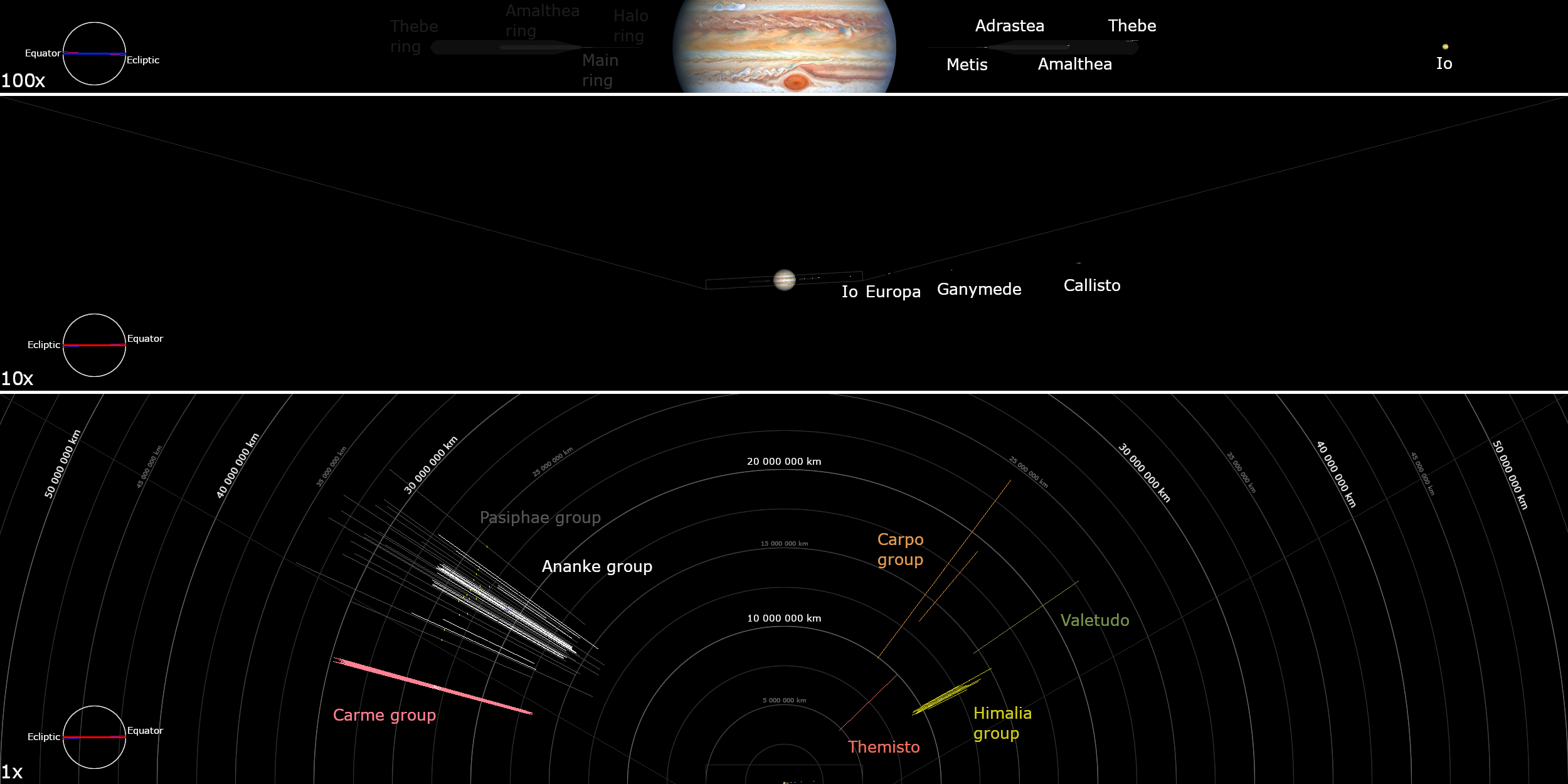
Orbital diagram of the orbital inclination and orbital distances for Jupiter's rings and moon system at various scales. Notable moons, moon groups, and rings are individually labeled. Open the image for full resolution.

== List of moons ==
The moons of Jupiter are listed below by orbital period. Moons massive enough for their surfaces to have collapsed into a spheroid are highlighted in bold. These are the four Galilean moons, which are comparable in size to the Moon. The other moons are much smaller. The least massive Galilean moon is over 7,000 times more massive than the most massive of the other moons. The irregular captured moons are shaded light gray and orange when prograde and yellow, red, and dark gray when retrograde. The orbits and mean distances of the irregular moons are highly variable over short timescales due to frequent planetary and solar perturbations, so proper orbital elements which are averaged over a period of time are preferably used. The proper orbital elements of the irregular moons listed here are averaged over a 400-year numerical integration by the Jet Propulsion Laboratory: for the above reasons, they may strongly differ from osculating orbital elements provided by other sources. Otherwise, recently discovered irregular moons without published proper elements are temporarily listed here with inaccurate osculating orbital elements that are italicized to distinguish them from other irregular moons with proper orbital elements. Some of the irregular moons' proper orbital periods in this list may not scale accordingly with their proper semi-major axes due to the aforementioned perturbations. The irregular moons' proper orbital elements are all based on the reference epoch of 1 January 2000. Some irregular moons have only been observed briefly for a year or two, but their orbits are known accurately enough that they will not be lost to positional uncertainties.

Key
Inner moons (4)	♠ **Galilean moons** (4)	† Themisto (1)
♣ Himalia group (11)	§ Carpo group (2)	± Valetudo (1)
♦ Ananke group (29)	♥ Carme group (41)	‡ Pasiphae group (22)

Label (Note: Label refers to the Roman numeral attributed to each moon in order of their naming.)	Name	Pronunciation	Image	Abs. mag.	Diameter (Note: Diameters with multiple entries such as "60 × 40 × 34" reflect that the body is not a perfect spheroid and that each of its dimensions has been measured well enough. The diameters of the Galilean moons were estimated by JPL, while the diameters and dimensions of the inner moons are from Thomas et al., 1998. The diameters of Himalia, Elara, Pasiphae, Sinope, Lysithea, Carme, Ananke, Leda, Callirrhoe, Kalyke, and Praxidike are from Grav et al., 2015. The diameter of Kallichore is from Rizos et al., 2026. The diameters of all other moons were taken from Sheppard's website.) (km)	Mass (Note: The only satellites with measured masses are Amalthea, Himalia, and the four Galilean moons. The masses of Metis and Thebe are estimated by assuming a density of 1.5 g/cm^{3} and 1.4 g/cm^{3} respectively, while the rest of the satellites are estimated by assuming a spherical volume and a density of 1 g/cm^{3}.) (× 10^{15} kg)	Semi-major axis (km)	Orbital period (Note: Periods with negative values are retrograde.) (d)	Inclination (°)	Eccentricity	Discovery year	Year announced	Discoverer	Group (Note: "?" refers to group assignments that are not considered sure yet.)
XVI	Metis	/ˈmiːtəs/		10.5	43.0±4.0 (60 × 40 × 34)	≈ 62	128000	+0.2959 (+7h 06m 04s)	0.060	0.0002	1979	1980	Synnott (Voyager 1)	Inner
XV	Adrastea	/ædrəˈstiːə/		12.0	16.4±4.0 (20 × 16 × 14)	≈ 2.3	129000	+0.2994 (+7h 11m 4s)	0.030	0.0015	1979	1979	Jewitt (Voyager 2)	Inner
V	Amalthea	/æməlˈθiːə/		7.1	167.0±4.0 (250 × 146 × 128)	2080	181366	+0.4990 (+11h 58m 37s)	0.374	0.0032	1892	1892	Barnard	Inner
XIV	Thebe	/ˈθiːbiː/		9.0	98.6±4.0 (116 × 98 × 84)	≈ 710	221889	+0.6753 (+16h 12m 27s)	1.076	0.0175	1979	1980	Synnott (Voyager 1)	Inner
I	**Io**♠	/ˈaɪoʊ/		−1.7	3642.6	89284845.2	421700	+1.7693 (+1d 18h 27m 46s)	0.050	0.0040	1610	1610	Galileo	Galilean
II	**Europa**♠	/jʊəˈroʊpə/		−1.4	3121.6	47987653.0	670900	+3.5504 (+3d 13h 12m 38s)	0.470	0.0090	1610	1610	Galileo	Galilean
III	**Ganymede**♠	/ˈɡænɪmiːd/		−2.1	5268.2	148190000	1070400	+7.1556	0.200	0.0013	1610	1610	Galileo	Galilean
IV	**Callisto**♠	/kəˈlɪstoʊ/		−1.2	4820.6	107590000	1882700	+16.690	0.192	0.0074	1610	1610	Galileo	Galilean
XVIII	Themisto†	/θəˈmɪstoʊ/		13.3	≈ 9	≈ 0.38	7397000	+129.97	44.3	0.257	1975/2000	1975	Kowal & Roemer/ Sheppard et al.	Themisto
	S/2011 J 4♣			16.9	≈ 3	≈ 0.014	11104600	+239.05	28.5	0.128	2011	2026	Sheppard	Himalia
XIII	Leda♣	/ˈliːdə/		12.7	21.5±1.7	≈ 5.2	11145200	+240.33	28.2	0.162	1974	1974	Kowal	Himalia
LXXI	Ersa♣	/ˈɜːrsə/		16.0	≈ 3	≈ 0.014	11399400	+248.62	29.0	0.117	2018	2018	Sheppard	Himalia
	S/2018 J 2♣			16.5	≈ 3	≈ 0.014	11419700	+249.28	28.3	0.152	2018	2022	Sheppard	Himalia
VI	Himalia♣	/hɪˈmeɪliə/		7.9	139.6±1.7 (150 × 120)	4200	11439000	+249.91	28.4	0.160	1904	1905	Perrine	Himalia
LXV	Pandia♣	/pænˈdaɪə/		16.3	≈ 3	≈ 0.014	11479600	+251.23	28.9	0.178	2017	2018	Sheppard	Himalia
X	Lysithea♣	/laɪˈsɪθiə/		11.2	42.2±0.7	≈ 39	11699100	+258.50	27.7	0.117	1938	1938	Nicholson	Himalia
VII	Elara♣	/ˈɛlərə/		9.6	79.9±1.7	≈ 270	11710700	+258.89	27.8	0.212	1905	1905	Perrine	Himalia
	S/2011 J 3♣			16.3	≈ 3	≈ 0.014	11716800	+259.09	27.6	0.192	2011	2022	Sheppard	Himalia
	S/2017 J 17♣			17.2	≈ 1	≈ 0.00052	11776100	+261.07	29.0	0.164	2017	2026	Sheppard	Himalia
LIII	Dia♣	/ˈdaɪə/		16.2	≈ 4	≈ 0.034	12257900	+277.25	29.1	0.232	2000	2001	Sheppard et al.	Himalia
	S/2018 J 4§			16.7	≈ 2	≈ 0.0042	16328500	+426.26	50.2	0.177	2018	2023	Sheppard	Carpo
XLVI	Carpo§	/ˈkɑːrpoʊ/		16.2	≈ 3	≈ 0.014	17039500	+454.40	53.3	0.415	2003	2003	Sheppard	Carpo
LXII	Valetudo±	/væləˈtjuːdoʊ/		17.0	≈ 1	≈ 0.00052	18690100	+522.07	34.5	0.217	2016	2018	Sheppard	Valetudo
XXXIV	Euporie♦	/ˈjuːpəriː/		16.3	≈ 2	≈ 0.0042	19261900	−546.18	145.5	0.148	2001	2002	Sheppard et al.	Ananke
LV	S/2003 J 18♦			16.4	≈ 2	≈ 0.0042	20332800	−592.33	145.7	0.102	2003	2003	Gladman	Ananke
LX	Eupheme♦	/juːˈfiːmiː/		16.5	≈ 2	≈ 0.0042	20763400	−611.32	147.9	0.234	2003	2003	Sheppard	Ananke
	S/2021 J 3♦			17.2	≈ 2	≈ 0.0042	20776600	−611.87	147.9	0.239	2021	2023	Sheppard	Ananke
LII	S/2010 J 2♦			17.4	≈ 1	≈ 0.00052	20786900	−612.35	148.0	0.244	2010	2011	Veillet	Ananke
LIV	S/2016 J 1♦			17.0	≈ 1	≈ 0.00052	20796700	−612.78	145.1	0.245	2016	2017	Sheppard	Ananke
XL	Mneme♦	/ˈniːmiː/		16.3	≈ 2	≈ 0.0042	20815800	−613.61	147.8	0.240	2003	2003	Sheppard & Gladman	Ananke
XXXIII	Euanthe♦	/juːˈænθiː/		16.4	≈ 3	≈ 0.014	20822900	−613.93	148.1	0.243	2001	2002	Sheppard et al.	Ananke
	S/2003 J 16♦			16.3	≈ 2	≈ 0.0042	20877500	−616.34	147.8	0.238	2003	2003	Gladman	Ananke
XXII	Harpalyke♦	/hɑːrˈpæləkiː/		15.9	≈ 4	≈ 0.034	20887500	−616.78	147.8	0.239	2000	2001	Sheppard et al.	Ananke
XXXV	Orthosie♦	/ɔːrˈθoʊziː/		16.6	≈ 2	≈ 0.0042	20897800	−617.23	144.2	0.294	2001	2002	Sheppard et al.	Ananke
XLV	Helike♦	/ˈhɛləkiː/		15.9	≈ 4	≈ 0.034	20911400	−617.86	154.4	0.155	2003	2003	Sheppard	Ananke
	S/2021 J 2♦			17.3	≈ 1	≈ 0.00052	20926600	−618.50	148.1	0.242	2021	2023	Sheppard	Ananke
XXVII	Praxidike♦	/prækˈsɪdəkiː/		14.8	7.0±0.7	≈ 0.18	20931100	−618.72	148.2	0.245	2000	2001	Sheppard et al.	Ananke
LXIV	S/2017 J 3♦			16.7	≈ 2	≈ 0.0042	20936500	−618.97	147.9	0.238	2017	2018	Sheppard	Ananke
	S/2021 J 1♦			17.3	≈ 1	≈ 0.00052	20954700	−619.77	150.5	0.228	2021	2023	Sheppard	Ananke
	S/2003 J 12♦			17.1	≈ 1	≈ 0.00052	20959300	−619.96	150.0	0.235	2003	2003	Sheppard	Ananke
LXVIII	S/2017 J 7♦			16.6	≈ 2	≈ 0.0042	20960400	−620.02	147.4	0.235	2017	2018	Sheppard	Ananke
XLII	Thelxinoe♦	/θɛlkˈsɪnoʊiː/		16.3	≈ 2	≈ 0.0042	20972300	−620.55	150.7	0.229	2003	2004	Sheppard & Gladman et al.	Ananke
XXIX	Thyone♦	/θaɪˈoʊniː/		15.8	≈ 4	≈ 0.034	20972700	−620.59	147.6	0.235	2001	2002	Sheppard et al.	Ananke
	S/2021 J 8♦			16.9	≈ 1	≈ 0.00052	20978900	−620.85	147.1	0.243	2021	2026	Sheppard et al.	Ananke
LXXIII	S/2003 J 2♦			16.7	≈ 2	≈ 0.0042	20992900	−621.47	150.1	0.225	2003	2003	Sheppard	Ananke
	S/2022 J 3♦			17.3	≈ 1	≈ 0.00052	21015100	−622.44	148.1	0.248	2022	2023	Sheppard	Ananke
XII	Ananke♦	/əˈnæŋkiː/		11.8	29.1±0.6	≈ 13	21029500	−623.11	147.6	0.238	1951	1951	Nicholson	Ananke
XXIV	Iocaste♦	/aɪəˈkæstiː/		15.4	≈ 5	≈ 0.065	21062300	−624.55	148.7	0.223	2000	2001	Sheppard et al.	Ananke
	S/2017 J 10♦			17.0	≈ 1	≈ 0.00052	21075800	−625.15	145.1	0.209	2017	2025	Sheppard	Ananke
XXX	Hermippe♦	/hərˈmɪpiː/		15.5	≈ 4	≈ 0.034	21103600	−626.38	150.2	0.220	2001	2002	Sheppard et al.	Ananke
	S/2010 J 6♦			16.5	≈ 2	≈ 0.0042	21489800	−643.67	149.9	0.297	2010	2026	Sheppard	Ananke
LXX	S/2017 J 9♦			16.1	≈ 3	≈ 0.014	21764200	−656.05	155.4	0.197	2017	2018	Sheppard	Ananke
LVIII	Philophrosyne‡	/fɪləˈfrɒzəniː/		16.6	≈ 2	≈ 0.0042	22600200	−694.20	146.1	0.221	2003	2003	Sheppard	Pasiphae
	S/2016 J 3♥			16.7	≈ 2	≈ 0.0042	22719300	−699.76	164.6	0.251	2016	2023	Sheppard	Carme
	S/2022 J 1♥			17.0	≈ 1	≈ 0.00052	22744700	−700.93	164.5	0.257	2022	2023	Sheppard	Carme
	S/2010 J 4♥			17.2	≈ 1	≈ 0.00052	22793400	−703.19	164.6	0.278	2010	2026	Sheppard	Carme
LXIX	S/2017 J 8♥			17.1	≈ 1	≈ 0.00052	22819600	−704.42	164.8	0.259	2017	2018	Sheppard	Carme
XXXVIII	Pasithee♥	/ˈpæsəθiː/		16.8	≈ 2	≈ 0.0042	22840800	−705.41	164.5	0.274	2001	2002	Sheppard et al.	Carme
	S/2017 J 13♥			17.0	≈ 1	≈ 0.00052	22842700	−705.50	164.5	0.277	2017	2026	Sheppard	Carme
	S/2021 J 6♥			17.3	≈ 1	≈ 0.00052	22870400	−706.77	164.9	0.271	2021	2023	Sheppard et al.	Carme
	S/2003 J 24♥			16.6	≈ 2	≈ 0.0042	22882400	−707.33	164.6	0.263	2003	2021	Sheppard et al.	Carme
XXXII	Eurydome‡	/jʊəˈrɪdəmiː/		16.2	≈ 3	≈ 0.014	22894500	−707.86	148.9	0.287	2001	2002	Sheppard et al.	Pasiphae
LVI	S/2011 J 2‡			16.9	≈ 1	≈ 0.00052	22903400	−708.29	151.7	0.358	2011	2012	Sheppard	Pasiphae
	S/2003 J 4‡			16.7	≈ 2	≈ 0.0042	22922300	−709.12	148.3	0.327	2003	2003	Sheppard	Pasiphae
	S/2017 J 18♥			16.8	≈ 2	≈ 0.0042	22923800	−709.24	164.9	0.254	2017	2026	Sheppard	Carme
XXI	Chaldene♥	/kælˈdiːniː/		16.0	≈ 4	≈ 0.034	22926300	−709.36	164.7	0.261	2000	2001	Sheppard et al.	Carme
LXIII	S/2017 J 2♥			16.8	≈ 2	≈ 0.0042	22949600	−710.42	164.5	0.270	2017	2018	Sheppard	Carme
XXVI	Isonoe♥	/aɪˈsɒnoʊiː/		15.9	≈ 4	≈ 0.034	22976300	−711.66	164.9	0.249	2000	2001	Sheppard et al.	Carme
	S/2017 J 11♥			17.1	≈ 1	≈ 0.00052	22991300	−712.38	164.8	0.268	2017	2025	Sheppard	Carme
	S/2017 J 16♥			17.2	≈ 1	≈ 0.00052	23007800	−713.13	164.7	0.268	2017	2026	Sheppard	Carme
XLIV	Kallichore♥	/kəˈlɪkəriː/		16.2	3.8+2.3 −0.3	≈ 0.029	23017100	−713.59	164.7	0.253	2003	2003	Sheppard	Carme
	S/2021 J 4♥			17.4	≈ 1	≈ 0.00052	23019700	−713.71	164.6	0.265	2021	2023	Sheppard	Carme
XXV	Erinome♥	/ɛˈrɪnəmiː/		16.0	≈ 3	≈ 0.014	23027200	−714.05	164.3	0.272	2000	2001	Sheppard et al.	Carme
XXXVII	Kale♥	/ˈkeɪliː/		16.1	≈ 2	≈ 0.0042	23047800	−715.02	164.6	0.262	2001	2002	Sheppard et al.	Carme
LVII	Eirene♥	/aɪˈriːniː/		15.8	≈ 4	≈ 0.034	23051300	−715.19	164.7	0.263	2003	2003	Sheppard	Carme
XXXI	Aitne♥	/ˈeɪtniː/		16.0	≈ 3	≈ 0.014	23059400	−715.54	164.5	0.273	2001	2002	Sheppard et al.	Carme
XLVII	Eukelade♥	/juːˈkɛlədiː/		15.9	≈ 4	≈ 0.034	23062400	−715.69	164.7	0.274	2003	2003	Sheppard	Carme
	S/2022 J 2♥			17.5	≈ 1	≈ 0.00052	23073400	−716.21	164.7	0.263	2022	2023	Sheppard	Carme
XLIII	Arche♥	/ˈɑːrkiː/		16.2	≈ 3	≈ 0.014	23093200	−717.11	164.5	0.263	2002	2002	Sheppard	Carme
XX	Taygete♥	/teɪˈɪdʒətiː/		15.6	≈ 5	≈ 0.065	23103400	−717.59	164.7	0.257	2000	2001	Sheppard et al.	Carme
	S/2016 J 4‡			17.3	≈ 1	≈ 0.00052	23113900	−718.04	147.1	0.294	2016	2023	Sheppard	Pasiphae
LXXII	S/2011 J 1♥			16.8	≈ 2	≈ 0.0042	23120800	−718.42	164.7	0.269	2011	2012	Sheppard	Carme
XI	Carme♥	/ˈkɑːrmiː/		10.7	46.7±0.9	≈ 53	23139200	−719.28	164.6	0.261	1938	1938	Nicholson	Carme
L	Herse♥	/ˈhɜːrsiː/		16.5	≈ 2	≈ 0.0042	23146700	−719.63	164.4	0.258	2003	2003	Gladman et al.	Carme
LXI	S/2003 J 19♥			16.6	≈ 2	≈ 0.0042	23153100	−719.92	164.6	0.264	2003	2003	Gladman	Carme
	S/2017 J 15‡			17.1	≈ 2	≈ 0.0042	23170300	−720.65	149.2	0.232	2017	2026	Sheppard	Pasiphae
LI	S/2010 J 1♥			16.5	≈ 2	≈ 0.0042	23185600	−721.43	164.5	0.256	2010	2011	Jacobson et al.	Carme
	S/2003 J 9♥			16.9	≈ 1	≈ 0.00052	23195100	−721.88	164.7	0.268	2003	2003	Sheppard	Carme
LXVI	S/2017 J 5♥			16.6	≈ 2	≈ 0.0042	23202000	−722.20	164.7	0.261	2017	2018	Sheppard	Carme
	S/2011 J 6♥			16.9	≈ 1	≈ 0.00052	23238700	−723.93	164.9	0.261	2011	2026	Sheppard	Carme
LXVII	S/2017 J 6‡			16.4	≈ 2	≈ 0.0042	23251200	−724.47	149.6	0.333	2017	2018	Sheppard	Pasiphae
	S/2018 J 5♥			17.1	≈ 2	≈ 0.0042	23269900	−725.38	164.9	0.261	2018	2026	Sheppard	Carme
	S/2017 J 12♥			17.3	≈ 1	≈ 0.00052	23270500	−725.40	164.8	0.257	2017	2026	Sheppard	Carme
XXIII	Kalyke♥	/ˈkæləkiː/		15.3	6.9±1.3	≈ 0.17	23298000	−726.70	164.7	0.261	2000	2001	Sheppard et al.	Carme
	S/2021 J 7‡			17.3	≈ 1	≈ 0.00052	23305900	−727.01	149.4	0.253	2021	2026	Sheppard	Pasiphae
XXXIX	Hegemone‡	/həˈdʒɛməniː/		15.6	≈ 3	≈ 0.014	23342600	−728.77	152.5	0.357	2003	2003	Sheppard	Pasiphae
	S/2003 J 10♥			16.9	≈ 2	≈ 0.0042	23384400	−730.74	164.6	0.257	2003	2003	Sheppard	Carme
	S/2018 J 3♥			17.3	≈ 1	≈ 0.00052	23400200	−731.49	164.9	0.268	2018	2023	Sheppard	Carme
	S/2017 J 14‡			17.0	≈ 1	≈ 0.00052	23412500	−732.04	142.7	0.436	2017	2026	Sheppard	Pasiphae
	S/2021 J 5♥			16.8	≈ 2	≈ 0.0042	23414600	−732.15	164.9	0.272	2021	2023	Sheppard et al.	Carme
	S/2024 J 1♥			16.9	≈ 2	≈ 0.0042	23462100	−734.38	164.7	0.273	2024	2026	Sheppard	Carme
VIII	Pasiphae‡	/pəˈsɪfeɪiː/		10.1	57.8±0.8	≈ 100	23463200	−734.42	148.3	0.412	1908	1908	Melotte	Pasiphae
	S/2011 J 5♥			17.2	≈ 2	≈ 0.0042	23527800	−737.46	164.6	0.251	2011	2026	Sheppard	Carme
XXXVI	Sponde‡	/ˈspɒndiː/		16.7	≈ 2	≈ 0.0042	23538700	−737.95	149.4	0.323	2001	2002	Sheppard et al.	Pasiphae
	S/2010 J 5♥			17.9	≈ 1	≈ 0.00052	23581000	−739.99	164.6	0.257	2010	2026	Ashton et al.	Carme
XIX	Megaclite‡	/ˌmɛɡəˈklaɪtiː/		15.1	≈ 6	≈ 0.11	23640100	−742.77	149.9	0.421	2000	2001	Sheppard et al.	Pasiphae
XLVIII	Cyllene‡	/səˈliːniː/		16.3	≈ 2	≈ 0.0042	23650000	−743.21	146.8	0.421	2003	2003	Sheppard	Pasiphae
IX	Sinope‡	/səˈnoʊpiː/		11.2	35.0±0.6	≈ 22	23679300	−744.60	157.3	0.262	1914	1914	Nicholson	Pasiphae
LIX	S/2017 J 1‡			16.8	≈ 2	≈ 0.0042	23739600	−747.44	145.6	0.321	2017	2017	Sheppard	Pasiphae
XLI	Aoede‡	/eɪˈiːdiː/		15.5	≈ 4	≈ 0.034	23773100	−749.07	155.7	0.437	2003	2003	Sheppard	Pasiphae
XXVIII	Autonoe‡	/ɔːˈtɒnoʊiː/		15.5	≈ 4	≈ 0.034	23785200	−749.61	150.7	0.326	2001	2002	Sheppard et al.	Pasiphae
XVII	Callirrhoe‡	/kəˈlɪroʊiː/		14.0	9.6±1.3	≈ 0.46	23789400	−749.79	144.9	0.290	1999	2000	Scotti et al.	Pasiphae
	S/2003 J 23‡			16.7	≈ 2	≈ 0.0042	23824000	−751.40	144.4	0.306	2003	2004	Sheppard	Pasiphae
	S/2010 J 3‡			17.2	≈ 1	≈ 0.00052	23862900	−753.28	148.3	0.313	2010	2026	Sheppard	Pasiphae
XLIX	Kore‡	/ˈkɔːriː/		16.6	≈ 2	≈ 0.0042	24203300	−769.42	141.7	0.338	2003	2003	Sheppard	Pasiphae

== Exploration ==
The orbit and motion of the Galilean moons around Jupiter, as captured by JunoCam aboard the Juno spacecraft

Jovian radiation
Moon	rem/day
Io	3600
Europa	540
Ganymede	8
Callisto	0.01
Earth (Max)	0.07
Earth (Avg)	0.0007

Nine spacecraft have visited Jupiter. The first were Pioneer 10 in 1973, and Pioneer 11 a year later, taking low-resolution images of the four Galilean moons and returning data on their atmospheres and radiation belts. The Voyager 1 and Voyager 2 probes visited Jupiter in 1979, discovering the volcanic activity on Io and the presence of water ice on the surface of Europa.

The Galileo spacecraft was the first to enter orbit around Jupiter, arriving in 1995 and studying it until 2003. During this period, Galileo gathered a large amount of information about the Jovian system, making close approaches to all of the Galilean moons and finding evidence for thin atmospheres on three of them, as well as the possibility of liquid water beneath the surfaces of Europa, Ganymede, and Callisto. It also discovered a magnetic field around Ganymede.

Then the Cassini probe to Saturn flew by Jupiter in 2000 and collected data on interactions of the Galilean moons with Jupiter's extended atmosphere. The New Horizons spacecraft flew by Jupiter in 2007 and made improved measurements of its satellites' orbital parameters.

In 2016, the Juno spacecraft imaged the Galilean moons from above their orbital plane as it approached Jupiter orbit insertion, creating a time-lapse movie of their motion. With a mission extension, Juno has since begun close flybys of the Galileans, flying by Ganymede in 2021 followed by Europa and Io in 2022. It flew by Io again in late 2023 and once more in early 2024.

The Jupiter Icy Moons Explorer (Juice) is an ESA spacecraft launched on 14 April 2023 to explore Jupiter and its largest icy moons, Ganymede, Callisto and Europa. Additionally, remote observations of Io, Jupiter's inner moons and irregular satellites are planned. The scientific investigations will focus on the moons' internal structures, surface characteristics and suspected subsurface oceans. In addition, Jupiter's atmosphere and magnetosphere, as well as its interactions with the moons, will be studied. Arrival in the Jupiter system is scheduled for July 2031. During its mission, Juice is expected to perform several flybys of the Galilean moons. On 7 October 2031, its reference trajectory is expected to take it approximately 960,000 km from the irregular moon Kallichore although a closer flyby is currently being investigated. Finally, in December 2034, the spacecraft is scheduled to enter orbit around Ganymede.

== See also ==
- Jupiter's moons in fiction
- Satellite system (astronomy)
