= S/2011 J 3 =

Outer moon of Jupiter

Discovery
- Discovered by: Scott S. Sheppard
- Discovery site: Las Campanas Obs.
- Discovery date: 27 September 2011

Orbital characteristics
- Epoch 9 August 2022 (JD 2459800.5)
- Observation arc: 10.98 yr (4,009 d); 2022-09-18 (last obs)
- Semi-major axis: 0.0788592 AU (11,797,170 km)
- Eccentricity: 0.1757518
- Orbital period (sidereal): +261.77 days
- Mean anomaly: 215.57916°
- Mean motion: 1° 22^{m} 30.884^{s} / day
- Inclination: 28.65923° (to ecliptic)
- Longitude of ascending node: 97.75374°
- Argument of perihelion: 222.10770°
- Satellite of: Jupiter
- Group: Himalia group

Physical characteristics
- Mean diameter: ≈3 km
- Albedo: 0.04 (assumed)
- Apparent magnitude: 23.1
- Absolute magnitude (H): 16.3 (41 obs)

S/2011 J 3 is a small outer natural satellite of Jupiter discovered by Scott S. Sheppard on 27 September 2011, using the 6.5-meter Magellan-Baade Telescope at Las Campanas Observatory, Chile. It was announced by the Minor Planet Center 11 years later on 20 December 2022, after observations were collected over a long enough time span to confirm the satellite's orbit.

S/2011 J 3 is part of the Himalia group, a tight cluster of prograde irregular moons of Jupiter that follow similar orbits to Himalia at semi-major axes between 11–12 million km (6.8–7.5 million mi) and inclinations between 26–31°. With an estimated diameter of 3 km (1.9 mi) for an absolute magnitude of 16.3, it is among the smallest known members of the Himalia group.
