= Pandia (moon) =

Outer moon of Jupiter

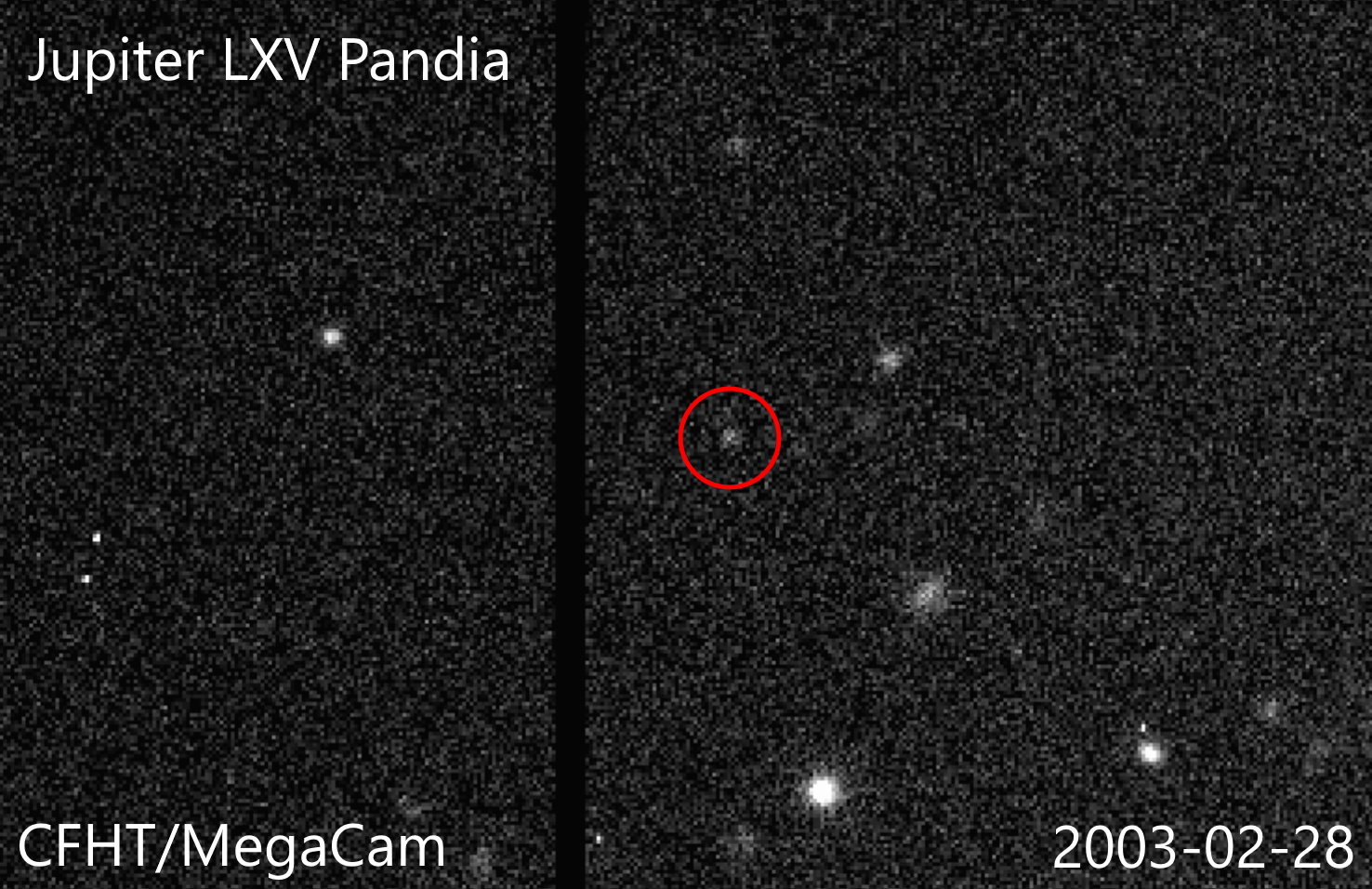
- Precovery image of Pandia taken by the Canada-France-Hawaii Telescope in February 2003

Discovery
- Discovered by: Scott S. Sheppard
- Discovery site: Cerro Tololo Obs.
- Discovery date: 23 March 2017

Designations
- Designation: Jupiter LXV
- Pronunciation: /pænˈdaɪə/
- Named after: Πανδία Pandīa
- Alternative names: S/2017 J 4

Orbital characteristics
- Epoch 1 January 2000 (JD 2451545.0)
- Observation arc: 7 years 2024-12-03 (last obs)
- Satellite of: Jupiter
- Group: Himalia group

Proper orbital elements
- Proper semi-major axis: 11,481,000 km (0.07675 AU) AU
- Proper eccentricity: 0.179
- Proper inclination: 29.0° (to ecliptic)
- Proper mean motion: 521.969928 deg / yr
- Proper orbital period: 0.68969 yr (251.911 d)
- Precession of perihelion: 9201.409 arcsec / yr
- Precession of the ascending node: 4451.925 arcsec / yr

Physical characteristics
- Mean diameter: ≈3 km
- Albedo: 0.04 (assumed)
- Apparent magnitude: 23.0
- Absolute magnitude (H): 16.28 (24 obs)

Pandia /pænˈdaɪə/, also designated Jupiter LXV, is a small outer natural satellite of Jupiter discovered by Scott S. Sheppard on 11 May 2018, using the 4.0-meter Víctor M. Blanco Telescope at Cerro Tololo Observatory, Chile. It was announced alongside nine other Jovian moons on 17 July 2018 and it provisionally designated S/2017 J 4 by the Minor Planet Center, after observations were collected over a long enough time span to confirm the satellite's orbit. The satellite has been found in precovery observations as early as 2003.

Pandia is part of the Himalia group, a tight cluster of prograde irregular moons of Jupiter that follow similar orbits to Himalia at semi-major axes between 11–12 million km (6.8–7.5 million mi) and inclinations between 26–31°. With an estimated diameter of 3 km (1.9 mi) for an absolute magnitude of 16.2, it is one of the smallest known members of the Himalia group.

== Discovery ==
Discovery images of Pandia from Cerro Tololo Observatory's Dark Energy Camera on 23 March 2017

Pandia was discovered by Scott S. Sheppard and his team on 23 March 2017, but not announced until 17 July 2018 via a Minor Planet Electronic Circular from the Minor Planet Center.

== Name ==
The moon was named in 2019 after Pandia (Πανδία Pandīa), the Greek goddess of the full moon, daughter of Zeus and Selene. Pandia was among the most popular suggestions in a naming contest held by the Carnegie Institute on Twitter, with the most significant submission coming from the astronomy club of the Lanivet School in Cornwall, United Kingdom that was submitted on their behalf by user "@emmabray182". They chose Pandia because their school's mascot is a panda and their local village used to supply bamboo for a panda at London Zoo.

It belongs to the prograde Himalia group which are given names ending in a.

== Orbit ==
On average, Pandia orbits Jupiter at a semi-major axis of about 11,481,000 km (7,134,000 mi) at an inclination of about 29.0° with respect to the ecliptic. Like all of Jupiter's irregular moons, Pandia orbits far enough away that it is highly subject to gravitational perturbations by the Sun and other planets, which makes its orbit highly variable over time.
