= S/2018 J 2 =

Outer moon of Jupiter

Discovery
- Discovered by: Scott S. Sheppard
- Discovery site: Cerro Tololo Obs.
- Discovery date: 12 May 2018

Orbital characteristics
- Epoch 9 August 2022 (JD 2459800.5)
- Observation arc: 19.48 yr (7,115 d); 2022-09-18 (last obs)
- Earliest precovery date: 27 March 2003
- Semi-major axis: 0.0766555 AU (11,467,500 km)
- Eccentricity: 0.1184102
- Orbital period (sidereal): +250.88 days
- Mean anomaly: 99.239°
- Mean motion: 1° 26^{m} 5.896^{s} / day
- Inclination: 29.40421° (to ecliptic)
- Longitude of ascending node: 66.06734°
- Argument of perihelion: 342.09685°
- Satellite of: Jupiter
- Group: Himalia group

Physical characteristics
- Mean diameter: ≈3 km
- Albedo: 0.04 (assumed)
- Apparent magnitude: 23.3
- Absolute magnitude (H): 16.47 (24 obs)

S/2018 J 2 is a small outer natural satellite of Jupiter discovered by Scott S. Sheppard on 12 May 2018, using the 4.0-meter Víctor M. Blanco Telescope at Cerro Tololo Observatory, Chile. It was announced by the Minor Planet Center four years later on 20 December 2022, after observations were collected over a long enough time span to confirm the satellite's orbit. The satellite has been found in precovery observations as early as 27 March 2003.

S/2018 J 2 is part of the Himalia group, a tight cluster of prograde irregular moons of Jupiter that follow similar orbits to Himalia at semi-major axes between 11–12 million km (6.8–7.5 million mi) and inclinations between 26–31°. With an estimated diameter of 3 km (1.9 mi) for an absolute magnitude of 16.5, it is among the smallest known members of the Himalia group.
