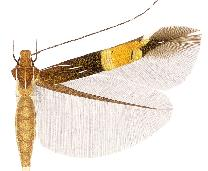

Scientific classification
- Kingdom: Animalia
- Phylum: Arthropoda
- Clade: Pancrustacea
- Class: Insecta
- Order: Lepidoptera
- Family: Cosmopterigidae
- Genus: Cosmopterix
- Species: C. himalia

Binomial name
- Cosmopterix himalia Koster, 2010

= Cosmopterix himalia =

Species of moth

Cosmopterix himalia is a moth of the family Cosmopterigidae. It is known from the Federal District of Brazil.

Adults have been recorded in May.

== Description ==
Female. Forewing length 3.6 mm. Head: frons shining greyish white, vertex and neck tufts shining dark bronze brown with greenish and reddish reflections, laterally and lined white, collar shining bronze brown; labial palpus, first segment very short, white, second segment four-fifths of the length of third, dark brown with white longitudinal lines laterally and ventrally, third segment white, dark brown lined laterally, extreme apex white; scape dorsally shining dark bronze brown with a white anterior line, ventrally shining white, antenna shining dark brown with an interrupted white line from base to two-thirds, followed towards apex by three dark brown segments, two white, ten dark brown, two white and five dark brown segments at apex. Thorax and tegulae shining bronze brown with reddish gloss, thorax with a white medial line, tegulae lined white inwardly. Legs: shining dark brown, femur of hindleg shining golden, foreleg with a white line on tibia and tarsal segments one to three and five, tibia of midleg leg with white oblique basal and medial lines and a white apical ring, tarsal segment one and two with a lateral white line, segment five white dorsally, tibia of hindleg as midleg, but the oblique lines silver metallic with bluish reflection, tarsal segments four and five entirely white, spurs white dorsally, dark brown ventrally. Forewing shining dark bronze brown with reddish tinge near base, dark brown towards apex, four narrow white lines in the basal area, a subcostal from base to one-quarter, sharply bending from costa in distal third, a short medial just above fold, from one-fifth to one-third, a subdorsal, as long as the medial, from one-quarter, a dorsal from beyond base to one-quarter, a brownish yellow transverse fascia beyond the middle, narrowed towards dorsum on the outer edge, bordered at the inner edge by a broad tubercular pale golden metallic fascia with a small subcostal patch of blackish scales on the outside, bordered at the outer edge by two tubercular pale golden metallic costal and dorsal spots, the dorsal spot about twice as large as the costal and more towards base, both spots with a narrow dark brown inward lining, a white costal streak from the costal spot, apical line as a silvery white spot in middle of the apical area and a white streak in the apical cilia, cilia dark brown, paler towards dorsum. Hindwing shining dark brownish grey with greenish and reddish gloss, cilia dark brown. Underside: forewing shining dark greyish brown, the white costal streak distinctly visible, hindwing shining dark greyish brown. Abdomen dorsally ochreous brown, ventrally shining dark grey, segments shining white banded posteriorly, shining golden laterally, anal tuft pale grey with bluish gloss dorsally, ventrally yellowish white.

== Etymology ==
The species is named after Himalia, a moon of Jupiter. To be treated as a noun in apposition.
