= Charles Dillon Perrine =

American astronomer (1867–1951)

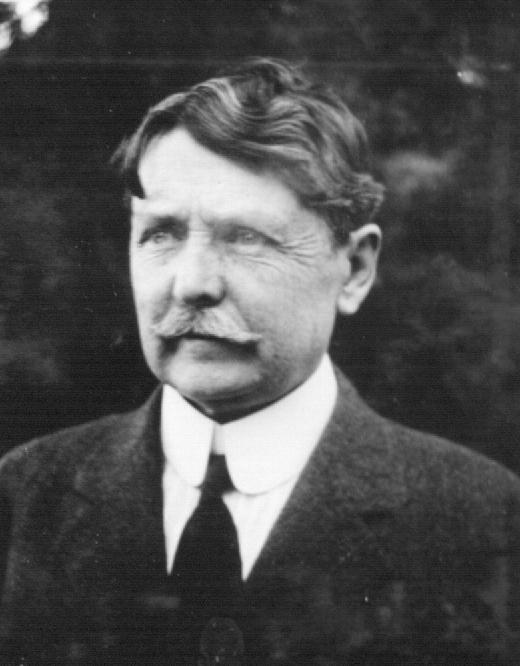
- Born: July 28, 1867; Steubenville, Ohio, U.S.
- Died: June 21, 1951 (aged 83); Villa Gen. Mitre, Cordoba, Argentina
- Education: Santa Clara College (honorary doctorate) (1905)
- Known for: First attempts at light deflection test of relativity (1912 solar eclipse, Brazil; 1914 solar eclipse, Russia). Discovery of sixth and seventh Moons of Jupiter: Himalia, Elara
- Spouse: Bell (Smith) Perrine (m. 1905)
- Awards: Lalande Prize (1897); Astronomical Society of Mexico Gold Medal (1905); Donohoe Comet Medals (x5) from the Astronomical Society of the Pacific; Panama–Pacific International Exposition Gold Medal (1915)
- Scientific career
- Fields: Astronomy, astrophysics, astrophotography
- Workplaces: Lick Observatory, Argentine National Observatory

Charles Dillon Perrine (July 28, 1867 – June 21, 1951) was an American astronomer at the Lick Observatory in California (1893-1909) who moved to Cordoba, Argentina to accept the position of Director of the Argentine National Observatory (1909-1936). The Cordoba Observatory under Perrine's direction made the first attempts to prove Einstein's theory of relativity by astronomical observation of the deflection of starlight near the Sun during the solar eclipse of October 10, 1912 in Cristina (Brazil), and the solar eclipse of August 21, 1914 at Feodosia, Crimea, Russian Empire. Rain in 1912 and clouds in 1914 prevented results.

In 1897 he was awarded the Lalande Prize and gold medal by the Paris Academy of Sciences given each year "to the person who makes the most outstanding observation ... to further the progress of Astronomy, in France or elsewhere.". He served as president of the Astronomical Society of the Pacific in 1902, was elected an Associate of the Royal Astronomical Society in 1904, and was awarded the gold medal of the Mexican Astronomical Society in 1905. In the same year he received the degree of Doctor of Sciences (honorary) from Santa Clara College (today Santa Clara University).

A crater on the far side of the Moon was named in his honor in 1970.

== Biography ==
=== Early years ===
Charles was born in Steubenville, Ohio, the son of Peter, a Methodist minister, and Elizabeth (McCauley) Perrine. He was a descendant of Daniel Perrin, "The Huguenot", and Maria Thorel whose marriage was the first (European) recorded in Elizabethtown, New Jersey, (Feb 18, 1666). Following high school graduation in 1884, he moved to Alameda, California in about 1886 and worked as a bookkeeper at Armour & Co., a meat-packing business in San Francisco.

Interested in photography and astronomy from an early age, and unable to afford a college education, "he nevertheless looked forward to engaging in astronomical work". Perrine responded to a general invitation to amateurs in astronomy and photography from E. S. Holden, the Director of the newly established Lick Observatory (1888), to observe the total solar eclipse of January 1, 1889 in Northern California. Perrine's report and photographs caught the attention of the Director who hired him as Secretary in 1893. Holden agreed to Perrine's "fixed purpose of devoting his spare time to the study of astronomical and related subjects, by way of preparation for later observatory duties".

=== Career ===
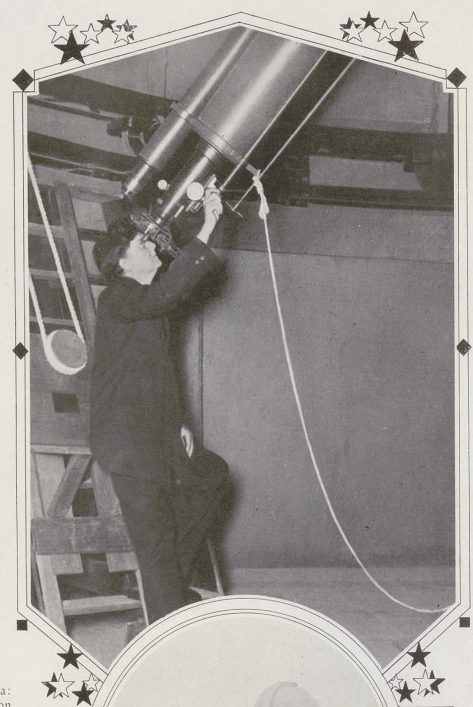
Charles Dillon Perrine in the Astronomical Observatory of Córdoba

As his experience, skills, and discoveries grew he was promoted to Secretary and Assistant Astronomer (1895), Assistant Astronomer (1902), and Astronomer (1905).

From 1895 to 1902 Perrine discovered eight unexpected and four periodic comets including the co-discovery of the lost periodic comet 18D/Perrine-Mrkos in 1896 (see list below). Antonín Mrkos later named the asteroid 6779 Perrine after him. The lunar crater Perrine is also named after him.

In 1904-05 he discovered the sixth and seventh moons of Jupiter, today known as Himalia (December 3, 1904) and Elara (February 21, 1905) using telescopic photography (glass plate negatives) with the 36-inch Crossley Reflector which he had recently rebuilt. At the time they were simply designated "Jupiter VI" and "Jupiter VII" and were given their present names in 1975. The first certain observations of Jupiter's moons (I - IV) were those published by Galileo Galilei in 1610. No additional moons were discovered until E. E. Barnard observed Amalthea (Jupiter V) in 1892.

Perrine participated in four solar eclipse expeditions of the Lick Observatory: 1900 (Georgia, USA), 1901 (Sumatra), 1905 (Spain), and 1908 (Flint Island), and was in charge of the one sent to Sumatra. Also in 1901, he and George Ritchey observed the apparent superluminal motion in the nebulosity surrounding Nova Persei 1901.

In 1909 he resigned from the Lick Observatory to accept the position of Director of the Argentine National Observatory (today, Observatorio Astronómico de Córdoba) at Cordoba, Argentina, a position which he held until his retirement in 1936 at age 69.

Perrine played an early role in the history of general relativity and tests of general relativity. The Argentine National Observatory led by Perrine made the first attempt to test Albert Einstein's Theory of Relativity by observing the deflection of star light near the Sun at a total solar eclipse. Perrine wrote, "The Cordoba Observatory made the first definite attempt to secure observations at an eclipse (that of 1912) for the relativity problem and that was done at the instigation of Dr. Freundlich." Einstein, in 1905, had proposed his Theory of Special Relativity which predicted that gravity bent light. In 1911 Einstein wrote, "It would be urgently wished that astronomers take up the question here raised (gravitational light deflection near the Sun),...". Dr. Erwin Finlay-Freundlich, a German astronomer and mathematician, took up Einstein's challenge and contacted Perrine in 1911 and 1912 to ask if he would undertake a test of light deflection near the Sun. Perrine agreed to add the test to his planned expedition to Cristina, Brazil to observe the total solar eclipse of October 10, 1912. William Wallace Campbell, the Director of the Lick Observatory, recognizing that Perrine would likely be the most experienced eclipse observer, also encouraged him to pursue the test and loaned him Lick's eclipse camera lenses with which Perrine had previous eclipse experience while at Lick. The Argentine National Observatory built the telescopes and readied the equipment at the observation site at Cristina, Brazil. Unfortunately, steady rain made visibility and therefore the test impossible. As Perrine put it, "We suffered a total eclipse instead of observing one". While observational results were elusive in 1912, the expedition produced valuable instruments (telescopes, cameras, timers, etc.) and experience for the next eclipse in 1914 in Russia. Three observatories would organize expeditions and include light deflection in their programs for 1914; the Argentine National Observatory (Perrine), the Lick Observatory (Campbell), and the Berlin-Babelsberg Observatory (Freundlich).

Perrine's photograph of the total solar eclipse of August 21, 1914 may have been the first taken with the intent and equipment to measure star light deflection near the Sun which effect was predicted by Einstein's Special Theory of Relativity in 1911. Thin clouds obscured the eclipse just enough to prevent accurate star observation. If these first attempts in Brazil in 1912 or Russia in 1914 had achieved results, they may have proven Einstein wrong because at that time (1911-1914) Einstein had predicted a light deflection of 0.87 arcseconds rather than the 1.75 arcseconds which he later calculated in 1915 with the General Theory of Relativity.

Perrine pioneered the study of astrophysics in Argentina and promoted the construction of the 60-inch/1.54 m reflecting telescope at Bosque Alegre which was completed in 1942 after his retirement in 1936. It would remain the largest telescope in South America until 1981 when Brazil built a 63-inch reflector. After retirement he lived first in Cordoba city and next in Villa General Mitre (originally and again Villa del Totoral) where he died. He is buried in the Cementerio del Salvador (Cemetery of the Savior) formerly called the Cementerio de Disidentes (cemetery of dissidents/non-Catholics), in the city of Córdoba.

== Comets discovered or co-discovered ==
- C/1895 W1 (Perrine)
- C/1896 C1 (Perrine-Lamp)
- C/1896 V1 (Perrine)
- 18D/Perrine-Mrkos
- C/1897 U1 (Perrine)
- C/1898 L2 (Perrine)
- C/1898 R1 (Perrine-Chofardet)
