= Valetudo (moon) =

Outer moon of Jupiter

- Precovery images of Valetudo taken by the Canada-France-Hawaii Telescope on 28 February 2003

Discovery
- Discovered by: Scott S. Sheppard et al.
- Discovery site: Las Campanas Obs.
- Discovery date: 9 March 2016

Designations
- Designation: Jupiter LXII
- Pronunciation: /væləˈtjuːdoʊ/
- Named after: Roman name for the Greek goddess, Hygieia
- Alternative names: S/2016 J 2
- Adjectives: Valetudian

Orbital characteristics
- Epoch 17 December 2020 (JD 2459200.5)
- Observation arc: 19 years 2022-09-02 (last obs)
- Earliest precovery date: 26 February 2003
- Semi-major axis: 0.1257974 AU (18,819,020 km)
- Eccentricity: 0.2018315
- Orbital period (sidereal): +1.44 yr (+527.41 d)
- Mean anomaly: 201.41718°
- Mean motion: 0° 40^{m} 57.274^{s} / day
- Inclination: 32.03294° (to the ecliptic)
- Longitude of ascending node: 235.45916°
- Argument of perihelion: 122.37546°
- Satellite of: Jupiter
- Group: (own group)

Physical characteristics
- Mean diameter: 1 km
- Apparent magnitude: 24.0
- Absolute magnitude (H): 17.0 (54 obs)

Valetudo /væləˈtjuːdoʊ/, also known as Jupiter LXII and originally known as S/2016 J 2, is an irregular moon of Jupiter. It was discovered by Scott S. Sheppard and his team in data acquired by the 6.5-m Magellan-Baade telescope of the Las Campanas Observatory in 2016, but was not announced until 17 July 2018, via a Minor Planet Electronic Circular from the Minor Planet Center, which also reported the discovery of nine other of Jupiter's moons. Besides data from Las Campanas, the original announcement also referred to data acquired through the 8.1-m Gemini North telescope of the Mauna Kea Observatories as well as the 4.0-m reflector of the Cerro Tololo Inter-American Observatory.

== Characteristics ==
Visualization of the orbits of Jupiter moons. Valetudo's orbit is depicted in green, moving clockwise.

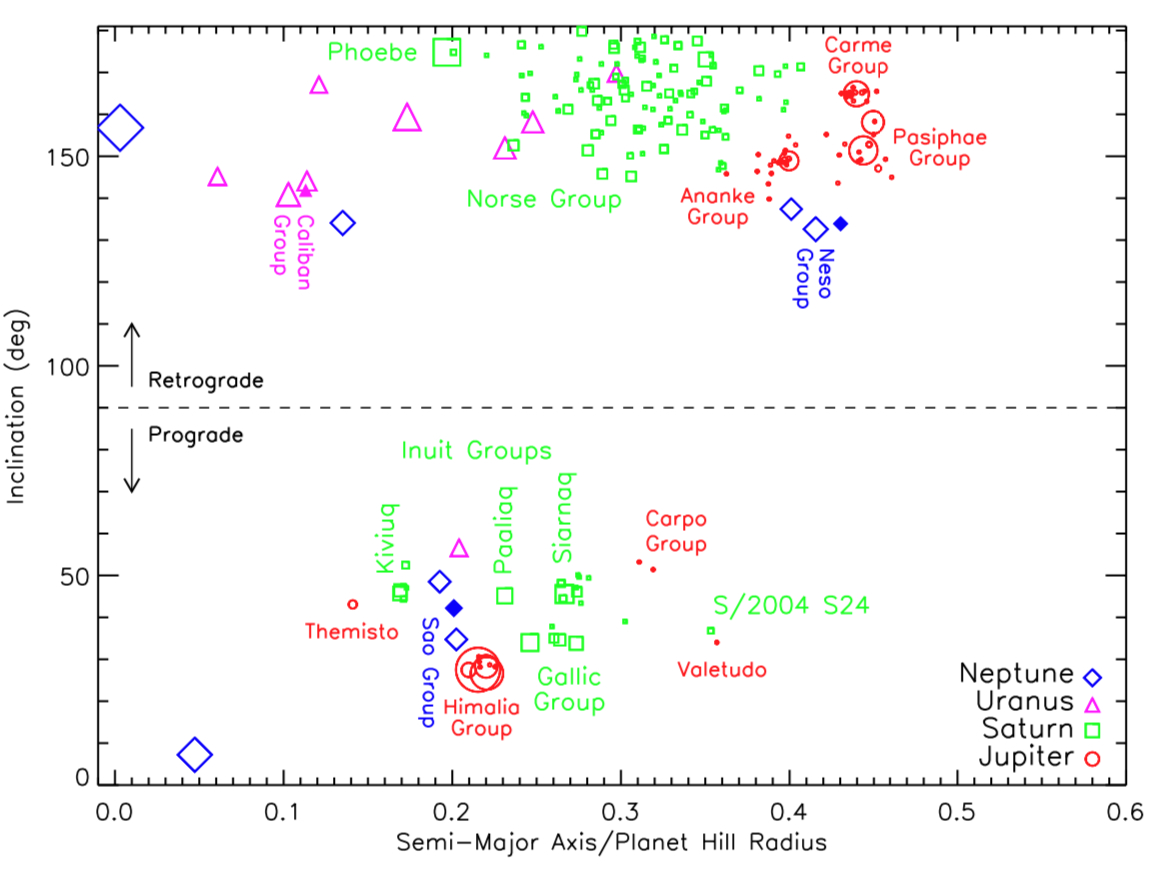
Valetudo (bottom right) in the context of other irregular moons of planets within the Solar System. Jupiter moons are indicated by red circles and can be clustered into five groups plus the solitary moons Valetudo and Themisto, which suggests that the current Jupiter moons originate from at least seven different outer moons.

Valetudo has a diameter of about 1 km (0.6 mi) and orbits Jupiter at a distance of about 19 million kilometres (12 million miles). Its orbital inclination is 34 degrees, and its orbital eccentricity is 0.222. It has a prograde orbit which takes almost a year and a half to complete, but it crosses paths with several other moons that have retrograde orbits and may in the future collide with them.

== Name ==
The moon was provisionally designated as S/2016 J 2 until it received its name in 2018. Sheppard proposed the name Valetudo, after the Roman goddess of health and hygiene (a Latin translation of Greek Hygieia 'Health') and a great-granddaughter of the god Jupiter. The name also alluded to Sheppard's girlfriend, whom he joked about being cleanly. The name conforms with the naming conventions for Jupiter moons set out by the International Astronomical Union (IAU), according to which a name ending in -o indicates a high inclination. The name was approved by the IAU Working Group for Planetary System Nomenclature on 3 October 2018.
