= Jupiter LII =

Moon of Jupiter

- Discovery images taken by the Canada-France-Hawaii Telescope in September 2010

Discovery
- Discovered by: Christian Veillet
- Discovery date: 8 September 2010

Designations
- Designation: Jupiter LII
- Alternative names: S/2010 J 2

Orbital characteristics
- Observation arc: 12 years 2022-08-30 (last obs)
- Semi-major axis: 20307150 km
- Eccentricity: 0.307
- Orbital period (sidereal): −588.1 days
- Inclination: 150.4°
- Satellite of: Jupiter
- Group: Ananke group

Physical characteristics
- Mean diameter: 1 km
- Apparent magnitude: 23.9
- Absolute magnitude (H): 17.35 (119 obs)

Jupiter LII, originally known as S/2010 J 2, is a natural satellite of Jupiter. It was discovered by Christian Veillet in 2010. It received its permanent number in March 2015. It takes 1.69 years to orbit around Jupiter, and its average distance is 21.01 million km. Jupiter LII has a diameter of about 1 kilometer and in 2010 it was labeled the smallest known moon in the Solar System to have been discovered from Earth. It is a member of the Ananke group. With an estimated diameter of 1 km (0.62 mi), Jupiter LII is one of the smallest known moons of Jupiter.

== See also ==
- S/2009 S 1, 400 m 'propeller moonlet' of Saturn, discovered by the Cassini orbiter
