= Dia (wife of Ixion) =

Woman in Greek mythology

In Greek mythology, Dia (/ˈdaɪ.ə/; Ancient Greek: Δία or Δῖα, romanized: Día, lit. 'heavenly', 'divine' or 'she who belongs to Zeus') is a Thessalian queen, wife of the nefarious Ixion and mother of the hero Pirithous. In some versions she bore Pirithous not to her husband but to Zeus, the king of the gods, who approached her in the form of a stallion. Although both her husband and son have major roles in ancient Greek tales, Dia plays no active role in them.

== Etymology and origins ==
Dia's name ultimately derives from 'Ζεύς', and can signify divinity. In the Mycenaean pantheon, a goddess Diwia (Linear B: 𐀇𐀹𐀊, Di-wi-ja)—who seems to have functioned as a female counterpart of Zeus (equivalent to Archaic Dione)—can be linked with the several Dias of the post-Dark Ages era, but the mortal queen's individual derivation from the goddess has been described as 'problematic.' The people of Sicyon worshipped a goddess named Dia, or else Hebe under this epithet. Dia thus might have originally been a byname for Hebe's mother Hera, wife of Zeus and the goddess that Dia's husband Ixion once attempted to consort with. It is possible that the formulaic poetic phrases δῖα θεάων and δῖα γυναικῶν, used to describe many reverend goddesses and women, were originally meant to designate Zeus' consorts as well.

== Mythology ==
Dia was the daughter of the Perrhaebian Eioneus (or Deioneus); no mother is mentioned. The king of the Lapiths Ixion asked for her hand in marriage, and promised lavish gifts to Dia's father in return. Although they did get married, Ixion never delivered the gifts he owed, and when Eioneus kept pestering him about it, he threw his father-in-law into a pit with ignited coal, killing him and making himself an outcast in the process.

Dia bore one son, Pirithous, to Ixion. Many versions of the tale however stated that Pirithous' father had not been Ixion, but the king of the gods Zeus himself, perhaps a result of Ixion's abhorrent treatment of Dia's father. In some authors, Zeus took the form of a horse in order to seduce Dia; their son was thus called Pirithous because Zeus had galloped around (perithein in ancient Greek) as a horse.

== Legacy ==
The moon Dia, one of the several natural satellites of the planet Jupiter (Roman Zeus) is named after this Dia.

== See also ==
Other women seduced by animal forms:

- Leda
- Europa
- Theophane

== Bibliography ==
- Apollodorus, The Library, with an English Translation by Sir James George Frazer, F.B.A., F.R.S. in 2 Volumes. Cambridge, MA, Harvard University Press; London, William Heinemann Ltd. 1921. Online version at the Perseus Digital Library.
- Avery, Catherine B., ed. (1962). New Century Classical Handbook. New York, US: Appleton-Century-Crofts.
- Bell, Robert E. (1991). Women of Classical Mythology: A Biographical Dictionary. ABC-Clio. ISBN 9780874365818.
- Diodorus Siculus, Bibliotheca Historica, translated by Charles Henry Oldfather, Loeb Classical Library 279. Cambridge, MA: Harvard University Press, 1933. Text available at the LacusCurtius.
- D Scholia to the Iliad, (Mythological Narratives (historiai), translated by R. Scott Smith et al. as Mythical Stories in the D Scholia to the Iliad, 2023. Online at Topos Text.
- Fox, Margalit (2013). The Riddle of the Labrynth: The Quest to Crack an Ancient Code. London, UK: Profile Books, Ltd. ISBN 978-1-78125-132-4.
- Graf, Fritz; Bloch, René (October 1, 2006). "Dia". In Cancik, Hubert; Schneider, Helmuth (eds.). Brill's New Pauly. Translated by Christine F. Salazar. Columbus, Berne: Brill Reference Online. ISSN 1574-9347.
- Graves, Robert (1955). The Greek Myths. Vol. I (3rd 1960 ed.). London: Penguin. ISBN 9780140010268.
- Grimal, Pierre (1987). The Dictionary of Classical Mythology. Wiley-Blackwell. ISBN 0-631-13209-0.
- Homer, The Iliad with an English Translation by A.T. Murray, PhD in two volumes. Cambridge, MA., Harvard University Press; London, William Heinemann, Ltd. 1924. Online version at the Perseus Digital Library.
- Hyginus, Gaius Julius, The Myths of Hyginus, edited and translated by Mary A. Grant, Lawrence: University of Kansas Press, 1960. Available on Topos Text.
- Kerenyi, Karl (1951). The Gods of the Greeks. Translated by Norman Cameron. London, New York: Thames & Hudson.
- Nonnus, Dionysiaca, translated by Rouse, W H D, II Books XVI-XXXV. Loeb Classical Library No. 345, Cambridge, Massachusetts, Harvard University Press; London, William Heinemann Ltd. 1940. Internet Archive.
- Pindar, The Odes of Pindar, translated by Diane Arnson Svarlien. 1990 Available at the Perseus Digital Library.
- Smith, William (1873). A Dictionary of Greek and Roman Biography and Mythology. London, UK: John Murray, printed by Spottiswoode and Co. Online version at the Perseus.tufts library.
- West, Martin L. (2007). Indo-European Poetry and Myth. Oxford, England: Oxford University Press. ISBN 978-0-19-928075-9.
