= Dia (moon) =

Outer moon of Jupiter

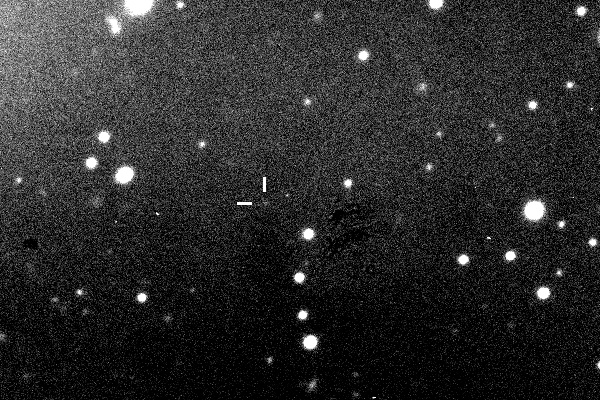
- Dia imaged by the Canada-France-Hawaii Telescope in December 2001

Discovery
- Discovered by: Scott S. Sheppard, David C. Jewitt, Yanga R. Fernández, and Eugene A. Magnier
- Discovery site: Mauna Kea Obs.
- Discovery date: 5 December 2000; 11 September 2012 (rediscovery)

Designations
- Designation: Jupiter LIII
- Pronunciation: /ˈdaɪ.ə/
- Named after: Δῖα Dīa
- Alternative names: S/2000 J 11
- Adjectives: Dian /ˈdaɪ.ən/

Orbital characteristics
- Observation arc: 24 years 2024-12-03 (last obs)
- Semi-major axis: 12118000 km
- Eccentricity: 0.211
- Orbital period (sidereal): +287.0 days
- Mean anomaly: 169.9°
- Inclination: 28.23°
- Longitude of ascending node: 290.9°
- Argument of perihelion: 178.0°
- Satellite of: Jupiter
- Group: Himalia group

Physical characteristics
- Mean diameter: 4 km
- Apparent magnitude: 22.4
- Absolute magnitude (H): 16.18 (42 obs)

Dia /ˈdaɪ.ə/, also known as Jupiter LIII, is a prograde irregular satellite of Jupiter. Provisionally known as S/2000 J 11, it received its name on March 7, 2015. It is named after Dia, daughter of Deioneus (or Eioneus), wife of Ixion. According to Homer, she was seduced by Zeus in stallion form; Pirithous was the issue.

The satellite is one of several known small bodies in the Himalia group.

Dia is thought to be about 4 kilometres in diameter. It orbits Jupiter at an average distance of 12 million km in 274 days, at an inclination of 28° (to Jupiter's equator), and with an eccentricity of 0.21.

== Observational history ==
Dia was discovered by a team of astronomers from the University of Hawaiʻi led by Scott S. Sheppard in 2000 with an observation arc of 26 days.

Initial observations were not followed up, and Dia was not observed for more than a decade after 2000. This apparent disappearance led some astronomers to consider the moon lost. One theory was that it had crashed into Himalia, creating a faint ring around Jupiter. However, it was finally recovered in observations made in 2010 and 2011.
