= Elara (moon) =

Outer moon of Jupiter

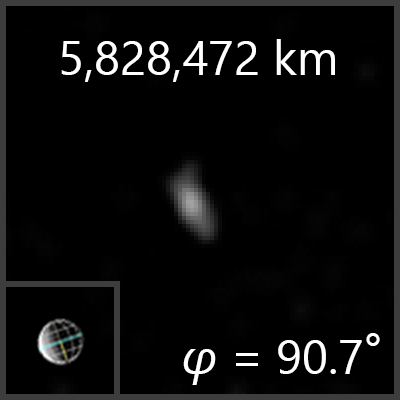
- Low-resolution image of Elara from the New Horizons probe, March 2007

Discovery
- Discovered by: Charles D. Perrine
- Discovery site: Lick Observatory
- Discovery date: 5 January 1905

Designations
- Designation: Jupiter VII
- Pronunciation: /ˈɛlərə/
- Named after: Ελάρα Elăra
- Adjectives: Elarian /ɛˈlɛəriən/

Orbital characteristics
- Epoch 27 April 2019 (JD 2458600.5)
- Observation arc: 113.70 yr (41,528 days)
- Semi-major axis: 0.0782306 AU (11,703,130 km)
- Eccentricity: 0.1961487
- Orbital period (sidereal): +258.65 d
- Mean anomaly: 10.93078°
- Mean motion: 1° 23^{m} 30.67^{s} / day
- Inclination: 30.51712° (to ecliptic)
- Longitude of ascending node: 90.86474°
- Argument of perihelion: 191.19922°
- Satellite of: Jupiter
- Group: Himalia group

Physical characteristics
- Mean diameter: 79.9±1.7 km
- Synodic rotation period: 9.596 h
- Albedo: 0.046±0.007
- Spectral type: C
- Apparent magnitude: 16.6
- Absolute magnitude (H): 9.6

Elara /ˈɛlərə/ also known as Jupiter VII, is the second largest irregular satellite of Jupiter.

== Discovery and naming ==
Elara was discovered by Charles Dillon Perrine of the Lick Observatory on January 6, 1905, the day after the discovery of Himalia, also by Perrine, was announced. Confirmation of the discovery was delayed until the 21st of February due to poor weather conditions.

It is named after Elara, one of Zeus's lovers and the mother of the giant Tityos. Elara did not receive its present name until 1975; before then, it was simply known as Jupiter VII. It was sometimes called "Hera" between 1955 and 1975.

== Orbit ==
Elara orbits Jupiter at an average distance of 11,703,130 km in 258,65 days, at an inclination of about 30° to the ecliptic, in a prograde direction and with an eccentricity of 0.196. Its orbit is continuously changing due to solar and planetary perturbations.

Elara belongs to the Himalia group, a prograde group of moons orbiting between 11 and 13 million km from Jupiter at an inclinations between 27 and 30°, and eccentricities between 0.11 and 0.24.

== Physical characteristics ==
Elara has a diameter of about 80 kilometers, with a measured albedo of about 4.6%, making it the eighth largest moon of Jupiter. It is about 2.6% of the size of Europa. It is half the size of Himalia, making it the second largest member of the Himalia group.

Like the other members of the Himalia group, the satellite appears gray (color indices B−V=0.66, R−V=0.36), which is typical for C-type asteroids.

A measured low beam value of 0.79 ± 0.03 indicates that Elara has considerable surface roughness.

In 1987 Elara was observed in an attempt to determine a rotation period. The result was inconclusive as its light curve was found to be too flat, and the small variations in brightness were not periodic in nature. This is in contrast to some earlier studies which reported larger brightness variations. It was suggested that the low magnitude variation could be explained if Elara's shape was close to spherical or its pole of rotation was being viewed head-on, or it simply had too long of a rotation period to detect. Later observations in 2020 found a possible rotation period of 9.596 hours.

== Origin ==
Elara probably did not form near Jupiter but was captured by Jupiter later. Like the other members of the Himalia group, which have similar orbits, Elara is probably the remnant of a broken, captured heliocentric asteroid.

== Exploration ==
=== New Horizons encounter ===
In February and March 2007, the New Horizons spacecraft to Pluto captured Elara in several LORRI images from a distance of 8 million km (5 million mi).

== See also ==
- Jupiter's moons in fiction
