= Leda (moon) =

Outer moon of Jupiter

- Discovery image of Leda taken by the Palomar Observatory in 1974

Discovery
- Discovered by: Charles T. Kowal
- Discovery site: Palomar Observatory
- Discovery date: 14 September 1974

Designations
- Designation: Jupiter XIII
- Pronunciation: /ˈliːdə/
- Named after: Λήδα Lēdā
- Adjectives: Ledian /ˈliːdiən/, Ledean /ˈliːdiən/ or /liːˈdiːən/

Orbital characteristics
- Epoch 16 February 2017 (JD 2457800.5)
- Observation arc: 42.60 yr (15,561 days)
- Semi-major axis: 0.0748405 AU (11,195,980 km)
- Eccentricity: 0.1648788
- Orbital period (sidereal): +242.02 d
- Mean anomaly: 137.02571°
- Mean motion: 1° 29^{m} 14.953^{s} / day
- Inclination: 27.63631° (to ecliptic)
- Longitude of ascending node: 190.18497°
- Argument of perihelion: 312.92965°
- Satellite of: Jupiter
- Group: Himalia group

Physical characteristics
- Mean diameter: 21.5±1.7 km
- Albedo: 0.034±0.006
- Spectral type: C
- Apparent magnitude: 20.2
- Absolute magnitude (H): 12.7

Leda /ˈliːdə/, also known as Jupiter XIII, is one of the innermost irregular satellites of Jupiter.

== Discovery and naming ==
It was discovered by Charles T. Kowal at the Mount Palomar Observatory on September 14, 1974, after three nights' worth of photographic plates had been taken (September 11 through 13; Leda appears on all of them).

It was named after Leda, who was raped by Zeus, the Greek equivalent of Jupiter (who came to her in the form of a swan). Kowal suggested the name and the IAU endorsed it in 1975.

== Orbit ==
Leda orbits Jupiter at an average distance of 11,195,980 km in 242.02 days, at an inclination of about 28° to the ecliptic, in a prograde direction and with an eccentricity of 0.165.

Leda belongs to the Himalia group, a prograde group of moons orbiting between 11 and 13 million km from Jupiter at inclinations between 27 and 30°, and eccentricities between 0.11 and 0.24.

== Physical characteristics ==
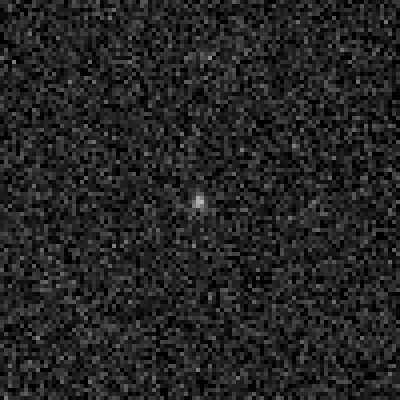
Single-exposure image of Leda by the Wide-field Infrared Survey Explorer (WISE) spacecraft in 2010

Leda has a diameter of about 21.5 kilometers, with a measured albedo of about 3.4%.

Like the other members of the Himalia group, the satellite appears gray (color indices B-V=0.66 ± 0.01, R-V=0.43 0.01), which is typical for C-type asteroids.

== Origin ==
Leda probably did not form near Jupiter but was captured by Jupiter later. Like the other members of the Himaila group, which have similar orbits, Leda is probably the remnant of a broken, captured heliocentric asteroid.

== See also ==
- Jupiter's moons in fiction
- Fire Maidens of Outer Space (1956 film)
