= Himalia group =

Satellites of Jupiter

This diagram compares the orbital elements and relative sizes of the known members of the Himalia group as of April 2026. The horizontal axis illustrates their average distance from Jupiter, the vertical axis their orbital inclination, and the circles their relative sizes.

The Himalia group (or family or cluster; also referred to as the 28° inclination cluster or simply the prograde group) is a group of prograde irregular satellites of Jupiter, named after its largest member, Himalia. The group is thought to have formed from the fragmentation of a captured parent body that suffered a collision while in orbit around Jupiter, making them a collisional family. Given the evident clustering of the orbital parameters and the spectral homogeneity, they appear compatible with a common origin, though the dispersion of their orbital elements is too large to be conventionally explained, suggesting post-formation scattering of the satellites or a particular set of circumstances of their collisional event.

== History and discovery ==
107 irregular moons of Jupiter plotted by semi-major axis and inclination as of April 2026. The Himalia group is shown as a tight cluster of blue-colored points on the right.

Up until the late 20th century, there were only eight known irregular satellites orbiting Jupiter, half of them prograde (Himalia, Elara, Lysithea, and Leda) and half of them retrograde (Pasiphae, Carme, Sinope, and Ananke). These eight are sometimes referred to as the "classical" irregular satellites of Jupiter. Scientists theorized that the progrades and retrogrades each formed a collisional family, from two different parent objects. It was even suggested that all eight satellites were created together from a single collisional event (albeit still from two parent bodies). These proposals were hard to support and were replaced by alternative theories as new moons were discovered.

While the retrograde moons were eventually determined to be composed of several different families, the concept of the prograde cluster remained intact and developed into what is known today as the Himalia group (among other names), though there are other prograde irregular moons now discovered that do not belong to the group.

The International Astronomical Union (IAU) reserved names ending in -a (Leda, Himalia and so on) to indicate moons that orbit in prograde motion relative to Jupiter, their gravitationally central object. This later shifted to only apply to members of the Himalia group; other prograde moons with higher inclinations (presumably unrelated to the group) now receive names ending in -o. Seven moons of the family have names at present.

Two possible satellites originally sighted by Sheppard in 2017 were identified to be likely part of the Himalia group, but were too faint (mag >24) to be tracked and confirmed as satellites. They were later officially reported as S/2011 J 3 and S/2018 J 2 in 2023, and confirmed to be part of the group.

== Characteristics ==
=== Physical characteristics ===
The Himalia group includes (in descending order by size): Himalia, Elara, Lysithea, Leda, and seven other smaller moons. The family dominates the mass of Jupiter's irregular satellites by a factor of ten; (Note: Assuming spherical volumes with equal densities for all satellites.) roughly 82% of this mass is in Himalia alone, and 8% out of the remaining 18% is with Elara. From studying its size distribution, it has been inferred that the parent body split into relatively large fragments proportionally; only 78% of the parent body's mass stayed with the largest fragment. While this means the parent body was not catastrophically disrupted, this is much less than some other satellite families originating from lighter collisions, where ~96–99% of the mass stayed with the largest fragment.

In physical appearance, the group is very homogeneous, all "classical" satellites displaying neutral colours and very low albedos, similar to those of C-type asteroids. However, even basic colour measurements are limited to those above ~10 km in size (only the classical moons are above this threshold), so physical information on the smaller moons remains unknown. Multiple studies have discovered a 0.7 μm feature in their spectra, indicative of aqueous alteration, where liquid water from melting ice interacts with rocks and minerals to make new hydrated materials. Both positive and negative detections of the 0.7 μm feature have been variously reported, though the same holds true for main belt asteroids between 2.6–3.5 AU, which are expected to be aqueously altered.

Observations with the James Webb Space Telescope found Himalia's spectrum to have a composite absorption feature, composed of a sharp feature at 2.72 μm associated with phyllosilicates and a more rounded feature at 3.05 μm associated with ammonium. Earlier ground-based observations had also supported the presence of hydrated silicates. Ammoniated phyllosilicates are the only single material that match, though the feature can also be replicated with a mixture of components. Lysithea has a simpler single absorption feature at 3 μm of unidentified origin. Elara matches a 50/50 average of Himalia's and Lysithea's around this region, though its spectrum overall does not. These three moons show a decreasing trend of ammoniated phyllosilicates with size, as well as a decrease in albedo. This is consistent with an aqueously altered parent object, with higher levels of it occurring closer to the interior, though it also may be in more localized pockets instead. The progenitor asteroid may have been midway through this process when it fragmented, at which point aqueous alteration stopped. A 2024 study proposes Himalia as the core of the parent body, Elara as a piece of the transition area between the core and an overlying layer, and Lysithea as material near or at the surface.

=== Orbital characteristics ===
The Himalia family has semi-major axes (distances from Jupiter) around ~11.6 million kilometres (0.078 AU) and inclinations of ~28°, and eccentricities in the range of 0.11−0.24. All orbit in a prograde direction. Along with Himalia's large size, the orbital characteristics of the group make them distinct from the other irregular satellites. The group orbits at closer distances, and have orbital eccentricities on the low end compared to other irregular moons. Their inclinations are also the lowest of the progrades. This is compatible with and plausibly suggest a past capture and evolution by gas drag from Jupiter's primordial circumplanetary disk.

The Himalia group is the cause of the dearth of irregular moons orbiting at distances 0.05–0.12 AU from Jupiter. Objects orbiting in this range have a high likelihood of colliding with the very large moons of the Himalia group over the lifespan of the Solar System, decreasing the population over time. Jupiter's retrograde moons that currently exist all orbit at distances of 0.13–0.16 AU, outside the depletion zone, so collisions between prograde and retrograde moons are not common today. However, many of the smaller members of the group that once existed are theorized to have been removed in collisions with Himalia over the past 4 billion years.

The Sun is the predominant source of short-term perturbations of the orbits of the moons, but Himalia is the greatest cause of long-term variations. Himalia's gravitational influence can lock the apses and nodes of the other moons to its own, forcing them into secular resonances with it. While the resonances are generally weak and temporary, a study found that Himalia group moons have a 90% chance of falling in resonance at some point over a billion-year timespan. Over time, the secular resonances with Himalia disperses the orbits of the other moons, which decreases the dispersion effect over time as the total dispersion increases.

While the membership of the Himalia group is well-defined, the moons are relatively widely spread in their orbital elements, more than expected from collisional dispersion or from secular resonances. There is significant spread in the semi-major axes and eccentricities, but the inclinations are narrowly distributed. This might have been caused by the parent asteroid suffering the collision while far away from an orbital node, or being hit from a direction roughly coplanar with its orbit. It could have instead been caused by Jupiter gravitationally interacting with other objects during planetary migration. Alternatively, there may have been a second collision event, as evidenced by some smaller moons clustering closer to Elara or Lysithea and further away from Himalia. The exact chain of events is difficult to reconstruct, but the current Himalia group's dispersion may be a result of a more recent, rich collisional history.

== Origin ==
The origins of irregular satellites cannot be definitively determined by observational evidence. The leading dynamical theory is that irregular moons in general are thought to have originated as Kuiper belt objects, before being scattered inward by planetary migration, then captured by the giant planets. However, this does not preclude alternate scenarios for any particular individual objects, and it is possible that they are a composite population of several different origins. However, Jupiter is relatively accessible to both asteroids in the inner Solar System and the small bodies of the outer Solar System. Proper comparisons are complicated by the characteristic lack of diagnostic spectral features of C, D, and P-type asteroids, which are the types most commonly cited as being similar to irregular satellites. Many studies have proposed that the Himalia family originates from the main asteroid belt.

=== Source population ===
One study concluded that the progenitor most likely originated from the Hilda group, which have semi-major axes of about 4 AU, and occupy the 3:2 resonance with Jupiter. The progenitor asteroid probably started off in heliocentric orbit with a distance about 3.8–4.2 AU. This region is devoid of asteroids except those safe in the orbital resonance, therefore the progenitor may have been a Hilda group member, before having its orbit destabilized in some way and captured by Jupiter. The Hilda group is dominated by P/D-type asteroids, as opposed to the Himalia group's C-type. However, the former also exhibits an empirical size-dependent trend in spectral slope, so the very largest members (153 Hilda and 334 Chicago) are classed as potentially C-type, while most other larger members fall into P-type, and smaller members tend to be D-type. Extrapolating this trend for an object the size of the Himalia group's progenitor (larger than both of the previously mentioned asteroids) places it squarely in the C-type, making it compatible with a Hilda group origin.

A study from 2000 proposed that the Himalia group originated from the Nysa–Polana complex (previously known as the "Nysa family" or the "Nysa–Hertha family"). (Note: It was later recognized that the "Nysa family" is actually a collection of overlapping unrelated asteroid families of different compositions. Despite being the namesake asteroid, 44 Nysa is now considered unrelated to any of the families in this complex. In fact, the Jarvis et al. (2000) study had already suggested that 44 Nysa was likely an interloper in the family as it was the only E-type asteroid.) Himalia was classed as an F-type asteroid, a subclass of C-type. Many known F-types are part of the carbonaceous population of the Nysa–Polana complex, so the authors speculated that it too, may have originated as a collisional fragment from there. As the group exists near the 3:1 Kirkwood gap (around 2.5 AU), this would have provided a dynamical pathway for the progenitor to move on a Jupiter-crossing orbit. The carbonaceous population was also thought to be old enough for a body to be captured while Jupiter's protoplanetary envelope still existed (for the gas-drag capture scenario). However, a later study asserted that the 3:1 Kirkwood gap was unlikely to be able to kick an object out to Jupiter's orbit. Furthermore, Himalia and Elara are as big or bigger than the largest asteroids in the Nysa–Polana complex, suggesting they are not related.

Alternatively, the progenitor may have come from the same source as the Jupiter trojans, which themselves are usually assumed to have formed in the primordial Kuiper belt before being scattered inward by planetary migration. However, the presence of ammoniated materials on Himalia (and the lack of it on Jupiter trojans) may preclude a shared origin, though Lysithea exhibits trojan-like material. The Himalia group and the trojans may still have a relationship between them if the so-far-unseen core of a trojan body resembles Himalia. Alternatively, the presence of ammoniated phyllosilicates is reminiscent of 1 Ceres and 10 Hygiea, possibly suggesting that the parent body formed in a similar location as Ceres.

=== Timing of family-forming impact ===
Unlike some other satellite families, the Himalia family likely did not form from an impact with a passing planetesimal during planetary migration. The parent body must split into relatively large fragments proportionally, as only 78% of the parent body's mass stayed with the largest fragment. Combined with the large assumed original diameter of 150 km, this requires a relatively energetic impact, with an impactor of diameter ~13 km. Planetesimals large enough to meet this threshold were probably not common enough. However, moon–moon collisions, with both retrograde and other prograde satellites, were historically a frequent occurrence for objects in the Himalia group's orbital position, suggesting the family may have formed in this manner, probably after planetary migration.

A study found that the Himalia group's orbital dispersion could be adequately explained by gravitational interactions between Jupiter and other planet-sized objects during planetary migration. This implies the collisional family having been already created before planetary migration, or in the early stages of it. Additionally, the chances of Jupiter capturing an object as large as Himalia during planetary migration is relatively low, further pointing to the possibility that its capture pre-dates this time. Objects with Himalia-like orbits that are relatively close-in were found to have a 1-30% chance of surviving planetary migration.

== List ==
The known members of the group are (in order of date announcement):

Name	Diameter (km)	Semi-Major Axis (km)	Period (days)	Notes
Himalia	139.6 (150 × 120)	11439000	249.91	largest member and group prototype
Elara	79.9	11710700	258.89	
Lysithea	42.2	11699100	258.50	
Leda	21.5	11145200	240.33	
Dia	4	12257900	277.25	
Pandia	3	11479600	251.23	
Ersa	3	11399400	248.62	
S/2018 J 2	3	11419700	249.28	
S/2011 J 3	3	11716800	259.09	
S/2011 J 4	3	11104600	239.05	
S/2017 J 17	1	11776100	261.07	
