= Lysithea (moon) =

Outer moon of Jupiter

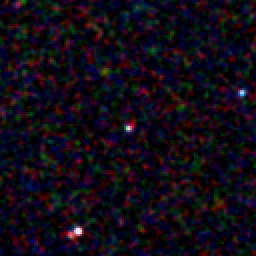
- Near-infrared photograph of Lysithea (center) by the 2MASS survey

Discovery
- Discovered by: Seth B. Nicholson
- Discovery site: Mt. Wilson Observatory
- Discovery date: 6 July 1938

Designations
- Designation: Jupiter X
- Pronunciation: /laɪˈsɪθiə/ (Note: Cf. also 'Lysithous' in Noah Webster (1884) A Practical Dictionary of the English Language)
- Named after: Λυσιθέα Lysithea
- Adjectives: Lysithean /laɪˈsɪθiən/

Orbital characteristics
- Epoch 27 April 2019 (JD 2458600.5)
- Observation arc: 79.87 yr (29,171 days)
- Semi-major axis: 0.0782144 AU (11,700,710 km)
- Eccentricity: 0.1478734
- Orbital period (sidereal): +258.57 d
- Mean anomaly: 27.18992°
- Mean motion: 1° 23^{m} 32.227^{s} / day
- Inclination: 26.29254° (to ecliptic)
- Longitude of ascending node: 343.46495°
- Argument of perihelion: 94.80010°
- Satellite of: Jupiter
- Group: Himalia group

Physical characteristics
- Mean diameter: 42.2±0.7 km (WISE); 42.2±3 km (occultation)
- Synodic rotation period: 12.78±0.10 h
- Albedo: 0.036±0.006
- Spectral type: C/P
- Apparent magnitude: 18.2
- Absolute magnitude (H): 11.2

Lysithea /laɪˈsɪθiə/, also known as Jupiter X, is one of the larger irregular satellites of Jupiter.

== Discovery and naming ==
Lysithea was discovered by Seth Barnes Nicholson in 1938 at Mount Wilson Observatory.

It is named after the mythological Lysithea, daughter of Oceanus and one of Zeus' lovers. Lysithea did not receive its present name until 1975; before then, it was simply known as Jupiter X. It was sometimes called "Demeter" from 1955 to 1975.

== Orbit ==
Lysithea orbits Jupiter at an average distance of 11,700,710 km in 258.57 days, at an inclination of about 27° to the ecliptic, in a prograde direction and with an eccentricity of 0.148. Its orbit is continuously changing due to solar and planetary perturbations.

Lysithea belongs to the Himalia group, a prograde group of moons orbiting between 11 and 13 Gm from Jupiter at an inclinations between 27 and 30°, and eccentricities between 0.11 and 0.24.

== Physical characteristics ==
Lysithea has a diameter of about 42 kilometers, with a measured albedo of about 3.6%, making it the fifth largest irregular moon of Jupiter.

Like the other members of the Himalia group, the satellite appears gray (B−V=0.72, V−R=0.36, V−I=0.74) and intermediate between C-type and P-type asteroids.

The rotation period was found to be approximately 12 hours and 45,6 min. This was regarded by a later paper as uncertain due to the short observation periods.

Lysithea observed by the Wide-field Infrared Survey Explorer (WISE) spacecraft in 2014

== Origin ==
Lysithea probably did not form near Jupiter but was captured by Jupiter later. Like the other members of the Himalia group, which have similar orbits, Lysithea is probably the remnant of a broken, captured heliocentric asteroid.

== See also ==
- Irregular satellites
- Jupiter's moons in fiction
