= Himalia (moon) =

Moon of Jupiter (Jupiter VI)

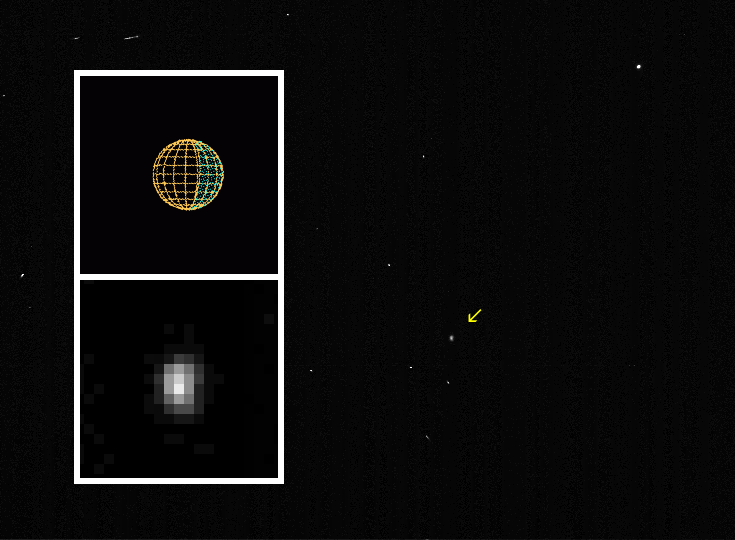
- Low-resolution image of Himalia from Cassini, December 2000

Discovery
- Discovered by: Charles D. Perrine
- Discovery site: Lick Observatory
- Discovery date: 3 December 1904

Designations
- Designation: Jupiter VI
- Pronunciation: /hɪˈmeɪliə/ or /hɪˈmɑːliə/
- Named after: Ἱμαλία Himalia
- Adjectives: Himalian

Orbital characteristics
- Epoch 27 April 2019 (JD 2458600.5)
- Observation arc: 114.25 yr (41,728 days)
- Semi-major axis: 0.0761287 AU (11,388,690 km)
- Eccentricity: 0.1537860
- Orbital period (sidereal): +248.29 d
- Mean anomaly: 94.30785°
- Mean motion: 1° 26^{m} 59.616^{s} / day
- Inclination: 29.90917° (to the ecliptic)
- Longitude of ascending node: 44.99935°
- Argument of perihelion: 21.60643°
- Satellite of: Jupiter
- Group: Himalia group

Physical characteristics
- Dimensions: 205.6 × 141.3 km (occultation, projected) (150 × 120) ± 20 km (Cassini estimate)
- Mean diameter: 139.6±1.7 km 170±20 km
- Mass: (4.2±0.6)×10^{18} kg (1.9–4.2)×10^{18} kg
- Mean density: 3.33±0.47 g/cm^{3} (assuming radius 67 km); 1.63 g/cm^{3} (assuming radius 85 km)
- Synodic rotation period: 7.7819±0.0005 h
- Albedo: 0.057±0.008; 0.05±0.01
- Spectral type: C
- Apparent magnitude: 14.6
- Absolute magnitude (H): 7.9

Himalia (/hɪˈmeɪliə, hɪˈmɑːliə/), also known as Jupiter VI, is the largest irregular satellite of Jupiter. With a diameter of around 140 km (90 mi), it is the sixth largest Jovian satellite, after the four Galilean moons and Amalthea. It was discovered by Charles Dillon Perrine at the Lick Observatory on 3 December 1904 and is named after the nymph Himalia, who bore three sons of Zeus (the Greek equivalent of Jupiter). It is the largest member of the Himalia group, a group of moons that orbit in the prograde direction around Jupiter, likely a collisional family originating from a captured asteroid.

== Discovery and naming ==
=== Discovery ===
Himalia was discovered by Charles Dillon Perrine at the Lick Observatory on 3 December 1904 in photographs taken with the 36-inch Crossley reflecting telescope which he had recently rebuilt.

=== Naming ===
The moon is named after the nymph Himalia, who bore three sons of Zeus (the Greek equivalent of Jupiter). The moon did not receive its present name until 1975; before then, it was simply known as Jupiter VI or Jupiter Satellite VI, although calls for a full name appeared shortly after its and Elara's discovery. A.C.D. Crommelin wrote in 1905:

Unfortunately the numeration of Jupiter's satellites is now in precisely the same confusion as that of Saturn's system was before the numbers were abandoned and names substituted. A similar course would seem to be advisable here; the designation V for the inner satellite [Amalthea] was tolerated for a time, as it was considered to be in a class by itself; but it has now got companions, so that this subterfuge disappears. The substitution of names for numerals is certainly more poetic.

The moon was sometimes called Hestia, after the Greek goddess, from 1955 to 1975.

== Orbit and orbital interactions ==
Animation of Himalia's orbit. Jupiter · Himalia · Callisto

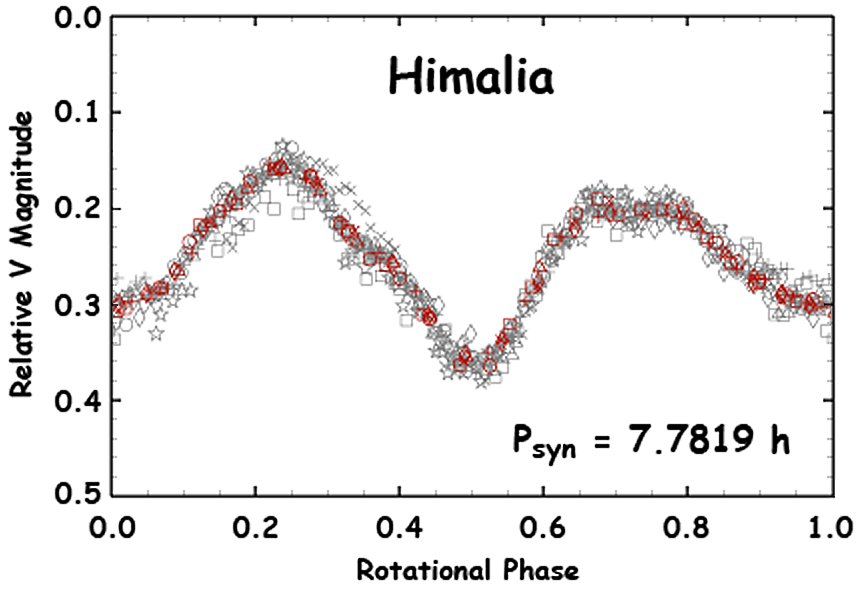
Himalia's rotational light curve from Earth-based observations taken between August and October 2010.

Himalia orbits Jupiter at an average distance of 11,388,690 km in 248,29 days, at an inclination of about 30° to the ecliptic, in a prograde direction and with an eccentricity of 0.154. Its orbit is continuously changing due to solar and planetary perturbations.

It gives its name to the Himalia group, a prograde group of moons orbiting between 11 and 13 Gm from Jupiter at inclinations between 27 and 30°, and eccentricities between 0.11 and 0.24. It and the other group members are likely fragments of a previous body that was shattered in a collision, making them a collisional family.

Due to Himalia's large size, it has a significant probability of impacting other moons over the lifetime of the Solar System. Any object that collided with Himalia is probably much smaller than it and would be erased from existence, and this may be a main cause of a lack of retrograde moons of Jupiter with semi-major axes 0.05–0.11 AU (7.5–16.5 million km). Surviving retrograde moons currently exist at distances above 0.13 AU (19 million km). The large separation in orbital distance between the prograde and retrograde groups of moons of Jupiter could be caused by the collisional elimination of moons previously existing within the gap.

Dust produced from these collisions spreads throughout the Jovian system, with much of it ending up collecting on the surfaces of the Galilean moons. Roughly 50% of the dust from the Himalia group impacts Callisto, 20% is ejected from the system or absorbed by Jupiter, and the remainder impacts the other Galilean moons.

=== Himalia ring ===
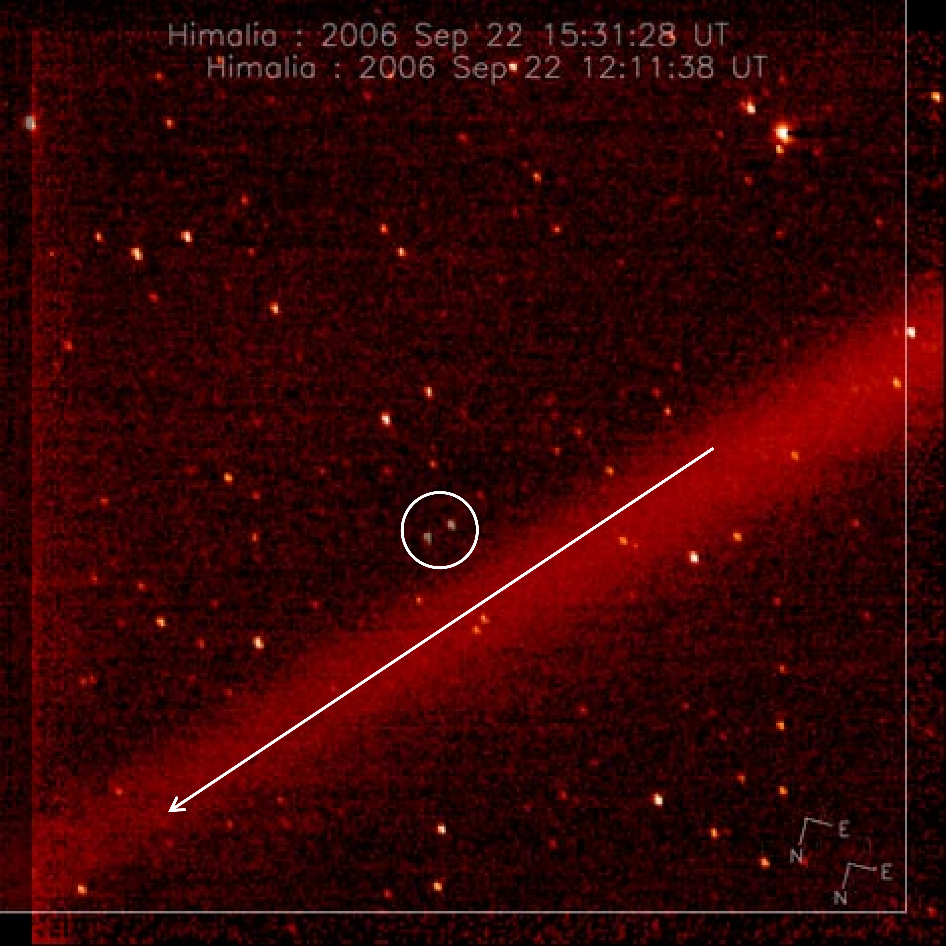
Composite of six New Horizons images of the possible Himalia ring. The double exposure of Himalia is circled. The arrow points to Jupiter.

In September 2006, as NASA's New Horizons mission to Pluto approached Jupiter for a gravity assist, it photographed what appeared to be a faint new planetary ring parallel with and slightly inside Himalia's orbit. Because the small (4-km) moon Dia, which had a similar orbit to Himalia, had gone missing since its discovery in 2000, there was some speculation that the ring could be debris from an impact of Dia into Himalia, suggesting that Jupiter continued to gain and lose small moons through collisions. However, an impact by an object the size of Dia would produce far more material than the calculated amount of ejected material needed to form the ring, although it is possible that a smaller, unknown moon may have been involved instead. The recovery of Dia in 2010 and 2011 disproved any connection between Dia and the Himalia ring.

== Physical characteristics ==
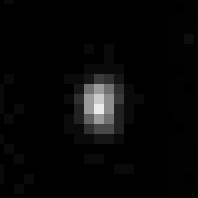
Cassini image of Himalia, taken in December 2000 from a distance of 4.4 million kilometres

Resolved images of Himalia by Cassini have led to a size estimate of 150 km × 120 km (93 mi × 75 mi), however due to the effects of limb darkening, the larger dimension may be a better reflection of its true size. Ground-based estimates suggest that Himalia is large, with a diameter around 170 km (110 mi). In May 2018, Himalia occulted a star, allowing for precise measurements of its size. The occultation was observed from the US state of Georgia. From the occultation, Himalia was given a size estimate of 205.6 km × 141.3 km (127.8 mi × 87.8 mi), in agreement with earlier ground-based estimates.

Himalia appears neutral in color (grey), like the other members of its group, with colour indices B−V=0.62, V−R=0.4, similar to a C-type asteroid. Measurements by Cassini confirm a featureless spectrum, with a slight absorption at 3 μm, which could indicate the presence of water. Its spectrum has been remarked to be strikingly similar to that of the asteroid 52 Europa.

Himalia's rotational period is 7 h 46 m 55±2 s.

=== Mass ===
In 2005, Emelyanov estimated Himalia to have a mass of (4.2±0.6)×10^{18} kg (GM=0.28±0.04), based on a perturbation of Elara on July 15, 1949, when the distance between them became a mere 65031 kilometers. Also in 2005, Christou tested several different masses of Himalia in a range of (1.7–5.2)×10^{18} kg to investigate a hypothesis that it gravitationally scattered other members of the Himalia group, and the hypothesis was found plausible given the mass was on the higher end, which was consistent with Emelyanov's estimate. However a later study asserted that at least twice that mass was required to fully explain the dispersion of the group. In 2017, Brozović and Jacobson found that Himalia's mass is constrained to (1.9–4.2)×10^{18} kg (GM=0.13–0.28), and showed that its mass could not be much larger than the value found by Emelyanov.

Although Himalia is the sixth-largest moon of Jupiter by size, it is probably the fifth-most massive. Amalthea is only a few kilometers bigger, but less dense. Himalia's density depends on whether it has an average radius of about 67 km (geometric mean from Cassini) (Note: However, instead of the geometric mean, Emelyanov simply uses a value of 67 km exactly, while Brozović and Jacobson use the arithmetic mean of 67.5 km.) or a radius closer to 85 km.

== Origin ==
Himalia probably did not form near Jupiter but was captured by Jupiter later. Like the other members of the Himalia group, which have similar orbits, it is probably the remnant of a broken, captured heliocentric asteroid. It has been suggested that Himalia or its parent asteroid was originally from the Nysa–Polana complex or the Hilda group, and the members of its group all have similar colours. However, the members of the Himalia group appear to be more dispersed in orbital element space than expected; proposals such as secondary collision events or gravitational scattering by Himalia are suggested to explain this.

In 2025, James Webb Space Telescope spectroscopic observations of Himalia detected phyllosilicates on the moon, suggesting that the material seen on its surface experienced past aqueous alteration. The results place Himalia as more similar to Ceres, which is known to have significant amounts of ammoniated phyllosilicates on its surface. Himalia may therefore be a product of capture from an asteroid belt source rather than the Kuiper belt; it is believed most irregular satellites are captured from the proto-Kuiper belt early in the Solar System's history during the events described by the Nice Model. An alternative explanation for Himalia's spectral signature is that phyllosilicates may be common in the interiors of related bodies, like Jupiter Trojans and Trans-Neptunian objects, however only in the highly collisional irregular satellite population can subsurface materials be exposed.

== Observation and exploration ==
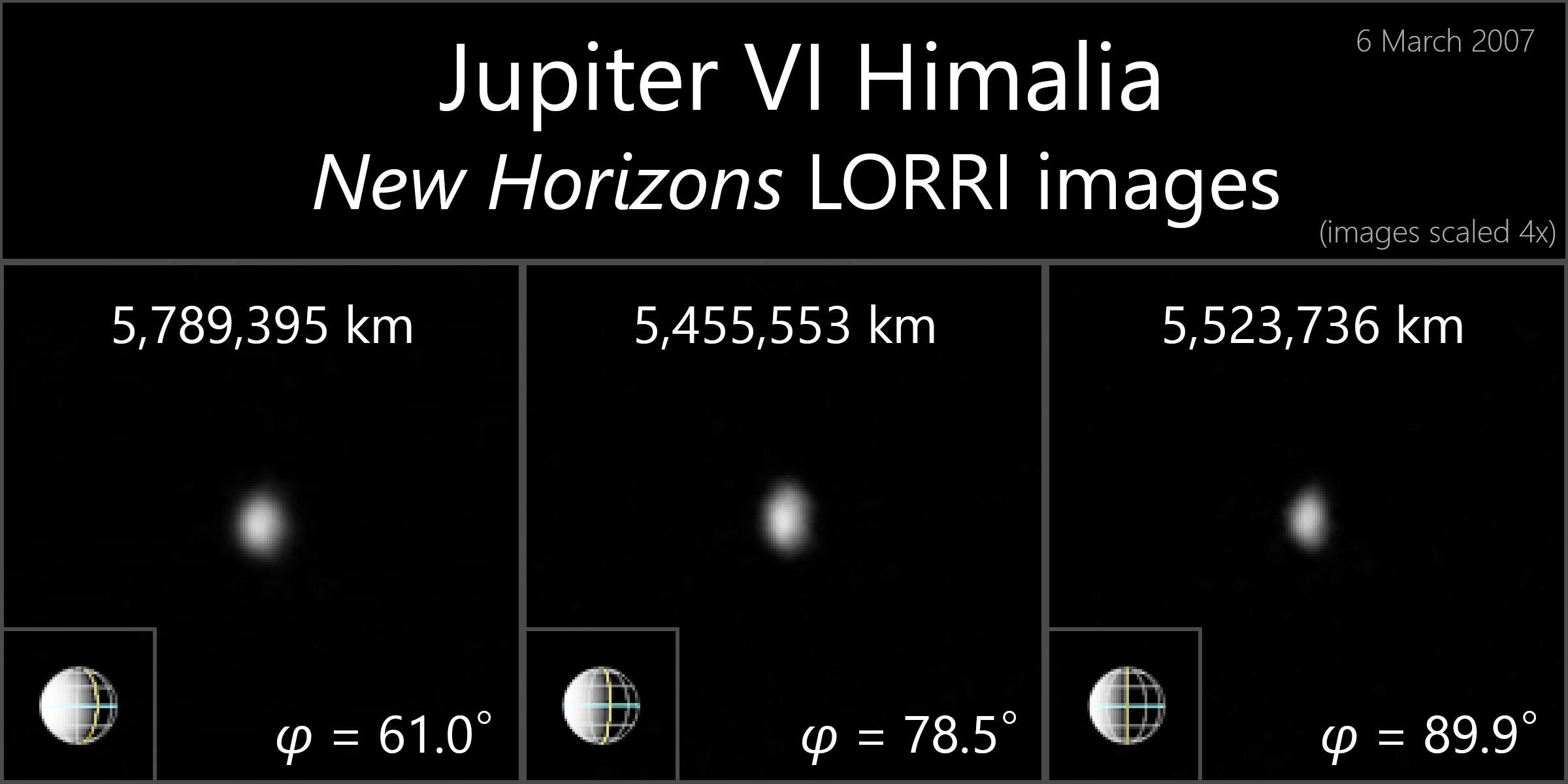
Phases of Himalia imaged by the LORRI instrument aboard New Horizons

Himalia observed by the Wide-field Infrared Survey Explorer (WISE) spacecraft in 2014

Himalia is Jupiter's most easily observed small satellite; though Amalthea is brighter, its proximity to the planet's brilliant disk makes it a far more difficult object to view.

Himalia is one of the largest planetary moons in the Solar System not imaged in detail, and the third largest among those within the orbit of Neptune. It is the largest with the exception of Sycorax and Puck orbiting Uranus, some of the moons of Neptune and several trans-Neptunian objects, particularly Dysnomia, the moon of Eris.

In November 2000, the Cassini spacecraft, en route to Saturn, made a number of images of Himalia, including photos from a distance of 4.4 million km. Himalia covers only a few pixels, but seems to be an elongated object with axes (150 × 120) ± 20 km, close to the Earth-based estimations.

In February and March 2007, the New Horizons spacecraft en route to Pluto made a series of images of Himalia, culminating in photos from a distance of 8 million km. Again, Himalia appears only a few pixels across.

== See also ==
- Moons of Jupiter
