= Naming of moons =

The naming of moons has been the responsibility of the International Astronomical Union's committee for Planetary System Nomenclature since 1973. That committee is known today as the Working Group for Planetary System Nomenclature (WGPSN).

Prior to its formation, the names of satellites have had varying histories. The choice of names is often determined by a satellite's discoverer; however, historically some satellites were not given names for many years after their discovery; for instance, Titan was discovered by Huygens in 1655, but was not named until 1847, almost two centuries later.

Before the IAU assumed responsibility for astronomical nomenclature, only twenty-five satellites had been given names that were in wide use and are still used: 1 of Earth, 2 of Mars, 5 of Jupiter, 10 of Saturn, 5 of Uranus, and 2 of Neptune. (Note: The Moon; Phobos and Deimos; Io, Europa, Ganymede, Callisto, and Amalthea; Mimas, Enceladus, Tethys, Dione, Rhea, Titan, Hyperion, Iapetus, Phoebe and Janus; Ariel, Umbriel, Titania, Oberon and Miranda; Triton and Nereid.) Since then, names have been given to 150 additional planetary and dwarf planetary satellites: 52 satellites of Jupiter, 53 of Saturn, 22 of Uranus, 12 of Neptune, 5 of Pluto, 2 of Haumea, and 1 each of Eris, Gonggong, Quaoar, and Orcus. Names have also been given to some satellites of minor planets, including the dwarf planet candidates Salacia and Varda which have one satellite each. The number will continue to rise as current satellite discoveries are documented and new satellites are discovered.

At the IAU General Assembly in July 2004, the WGPSN suggested it may become advisable to not name small satellites, as CCD technology makes it possible to discover satellites as small as 1 km in diameter. Until 2014, names were applied to all planetary moons discovered, regardless of size. From 2015, some small moons have not received names.

== Naming of moons by Solar System object ==
=== Earth ===
Every human language has its own word for the Earth's Moon, and these words are the ones normally used in astronomical contexts. However, a number of fanciful or mythological names for the Moon have been used in the context of astronomy (an even larger number of lunar epithets have been used in non-astronomical contexts). In the 17th century, the Moon was sometimes referred to as Proserpina. More recently, especially in science-fiction content, the Moon has been called Earth I, analogue to the numbering of Jovian moons with roman numbers, or by the Latin name Luna, presumably on the analogy of the Latin names of the planets, or by association with the adjectival form lunar, or a need to differentiate it from other moons that may be present in a fictional setting; however, in several Romance languages, such as Spanish, the word "luna" is often used to refer to any natural satellite in the same way as "moon" in English, which is problematic.

In technical terminology, the word-stems seleno- (from Greek selēnē "moon") and cynthi- (from Cynthia, an epithet of the goddess Artemis or Diana) are sometimes used to refer to the Moon, as in selenography, selenology, and pericynthion.

=== Mars ===
The moons of Mars (Phobos and Deimos) were named by Asaph Hall in 1878, soon after he discovered them. They are named after the sons of the god Ares (the Greek equivalent of the Roman god Mars).

=== Jupiter ===
The Galilean moons of Jupiter (Io, Europa, Ganymede and Callisto) were named by Simon Marius soon after their discovery in 1610. However, by the late 19th century these names had fallen out of favor, and for a long time it was most common to refer to them in the astronomical literature simply as "Jupiter I", "Jupiter II", etc., or as "the first satellite of Jupiter", "Jupiter's second satellite", etc.

By the first decade of the 20th century, the names Io, Europa, Ganymede, and Callisto had once again recovered popularity, but the later-discovered moons, numbered, usually in Roman numerals V (5) through XII (12), remained unnamed. By a popular though unofficial convention, Jupiter V, discovered in 1892, was given the name Amalthea, first used by the French astronomer Camille Flammarion.

The other irregular satellites (discovered 1904 to 1951) were, in the overwhelming majority of astronomical literature, simply left nameless. No names were proposed until Brian G. Marsden suggested a nomenclature for these satellites in 1955. Although the 1955 names met with immediate acceptance in some quarters (e.g. in science fiction and popular science articles), they were still rarely if ever met in astronomical literature until the 1970s.

Two other proposals for naming the satellites were made between 1955 and 1975, both by Soviet astronomers, E. I. Nesterovich (in 1962) and Yu. A. Karpenko (in 1973). These met no particularly enthusiastic reception.

In 1975, following Charles Kowal's discovery of the satellite Jupiter XIII in 1974, the IAU Task Group for Outer Solar System Nomenclature granted names to satellites V-XIII, and provided for a formal naming process for future satellites to be discovered. Under the new process, Jupiter V continued as Amalthea, Jupiter XIII was named Leda in accordance with a suggestion of Kowal's, and all previous proposals for the seven satellites VI-XII were abandoned in favor of new names, in accordance with a scheme suggested by the German philologist Jürgen Blunck where prograde moons received names ending in 'a' and retrograde moons received names ending in 'e'.

The new names met considerable protest from some quarters. Kowal, despite suggesting a name for Jupiter XIII, was of the opinion that Jupiter's irregular satellites should not be named at all. Carl Sagan noted that the names chosen were extraordinarily obscure (a fact that Tobias Owen, chair of the Task Group, admitted was intentional in a response to Sagan) and suggested his own names in 1976; these preserved some of the names from the 1955 proposal. Karpenko had noted the same in his 1981 book "The Names of the Starry Sky", along with stating that the names chosen for retrograde moons, and therefore the "e" ending, were not always the ones for which it was the more common one.

The proposals are summarized in the table below (data from Icarus unless specified otherwise):

Number	1955 Proposal Brian Marsden	1962 Proposal E. I. Nesterovich	1973 Proposal Yu. A. Karpenko	1975 Proposal IAU Committee	1976 Proposal Carl Sagan
Jupiter VI	Hestia	Atlas	Adrastea	Himalia	Maia
Jupiter VII	Hera	Hercules	Danae	Elara	Hera
Jupiter VIII	Poseidon	Persephone	Helen	Pasiphae	Alcmene
Jupiter IX	Hades	Cerberus	Ida	Sinope	Leto
Jupiter X	Demeter	Prometheus	Latona	Lysithea	Demeter
Jupiter XI	Pan	Dedalus	Leda	Carme	Semele
Jupiter XII	Adrastea	Hephaestus	Semele	Ananke	Danae

Current practice is that newly discovered moons of Jupiter must be named after lovers or descendants of the mythological Jupiter (Zeus). Blunck's scheme for the outer moons was retained, with the addition that names ending in 'o' could also be used for prograde moons. At the IAU General Assembly in July 2004, the WGPSN allowed Jovian satellites to be named for Zeus' descendants in addition to his lovers and favorites which were the previous source of names, due to the large number of new Jovian satellites that had then recently been discovered. All of Jupiter's satellites from XXXIV (Euporie) on were named for descendants of Zeus, until Jupiter LIII (Dia), named after another one of his lovers.

=== Saturn ===
In 1847, the seven then known moons of Saturn were named by John Herschel. Herschel named Saturn's two innermost moons (Mimas and Enceladus) after the mythological Greek Giants, and the outer five after the Titans (Titan, Iapetus) and Titanesses (Tethys, Dione, Rhea) of the same mythology. Until then, Titan was known as the "Huygenian (or Huyghenian) satellite of Saturn" and the other moons had Roman numeral designations in order of their distance from Saturn. Subsequent discoverers of Saturnian moons followed Herschel's scheme: Hyperion was discovered soon after in 1848, and the ninth moon, Phoebe, was named by its discoverer in 1899 soon after its discovery; they were named for a Titan and a Titaness respectively. The name of Janus was suggested by its discoverer, Audouin Dollfus.

Current IAU practice for newly discovered inner moons is to continue with Herschel's system, naming them after Titans or their descendants. However, the increasing number of moons that were being discovered in the 21st century caused the IAU to draw up a new scheme for the outer moons. At the IAU General Assembly in July 2004, the WGPSN allowed satellites of Saturn to have names of giants and monsters in mythologies other than the Greco-Roman. Since the outer moons fall naturally into three groups, one group is named after Norse giants, one after Gallic giants, and one after Inuit giants. The only moon that fails to fit this scheme is the Greek-named Phoebe, which is in the Norse group.

=== Uranus ===
The Roman numbering scheme of Uranus' moons was in a state of flux for a considerable time. Sir William Herschel thought he had discovered up to six moons and maybe even a ring. For nearly fifty years, Herschel's instrument was the only one the moons had been seen with. In the 1840s, better instruments and a more favourable position of Uranus in the sky led to sporadic indications of satellites additional to Titania and Oberon. Publications hesitated between William Herschel's designations (where Titania and Oberon are Uranus II and IV) and William Lassell's (where they are sometimes I and II). With the confirmation of Ariel and Umbriel, Lassell numbered the moons I through IV from Uranus outward, and this finally stuck.

The first two Uranian moons, discovered in 1787, did not receive names until 1852, a year after two more moons had been discovered. The responsibility for naming was taken by John Herschel, son of the discoverer of Uranus. Herschel, instead of assigning names from Greek mythology, named the moons after magical spirits in English literature: the fairies Oberon and Titania from William Shakespeare's A Midsummer Night's Dream, and the sylphs Ariel and Umbriel from Alexander Pope's The Rape of the Lock (Ariel is also a sprite in Shakespeare's The Tempest). The reasoning was presumably that Uranus, as god of the sky and air, would be attended by spirits of the air.

Subsequent names, rather than continuing the "airy spirits" theme (only Puck and Mab continuing the trend), have focused on Herschel's source material. In 1949, the fifth moon, Miranda, was named by its discoverer, Gerard Kuiper, after a thoroughly mortal character in Shakespeare's The Tempest. Current IAU practice is to name moons after characters from Shakespeare's plays and The Rape of the Lock (although at present only Ariel, Umbriel, and Belinda have names drawn from the latter poem, all the rest being from Shakespeare). All the retrograde irregular moons are named after characters from one play, The Tempest; the only prograde irregular moon, Margaret, is named from Much Ado About Nothing.

=== Neptune ===
The one known moon (at the time) of Neptune was not named for many decades. Although the name Triton was suggested in 1880 by Camille Flammarion, it did not come into general use until the mid 20th-century, and for many years was considered "unofficial". In the astronomical literature it was simply referred to as "the satellite of Neptune". Later, the second known moon, Nereid, was named by its discoverer in 1949, Gerard P. Kuiper, soon after its discovery.

Current IAU practice for newly discovered Neptunian moons is to accord with these first two choices by naming them after Greek sea deities.

For the "normal" irregular satellites, the general convention is to use names ending in "a" for prograde satellites, names ending in "e" for retrograde satellites, and names ending in "o" for exceptionally inclined satellites, exactly like the convention for the moons of Jupiter.

=== Pluto ===
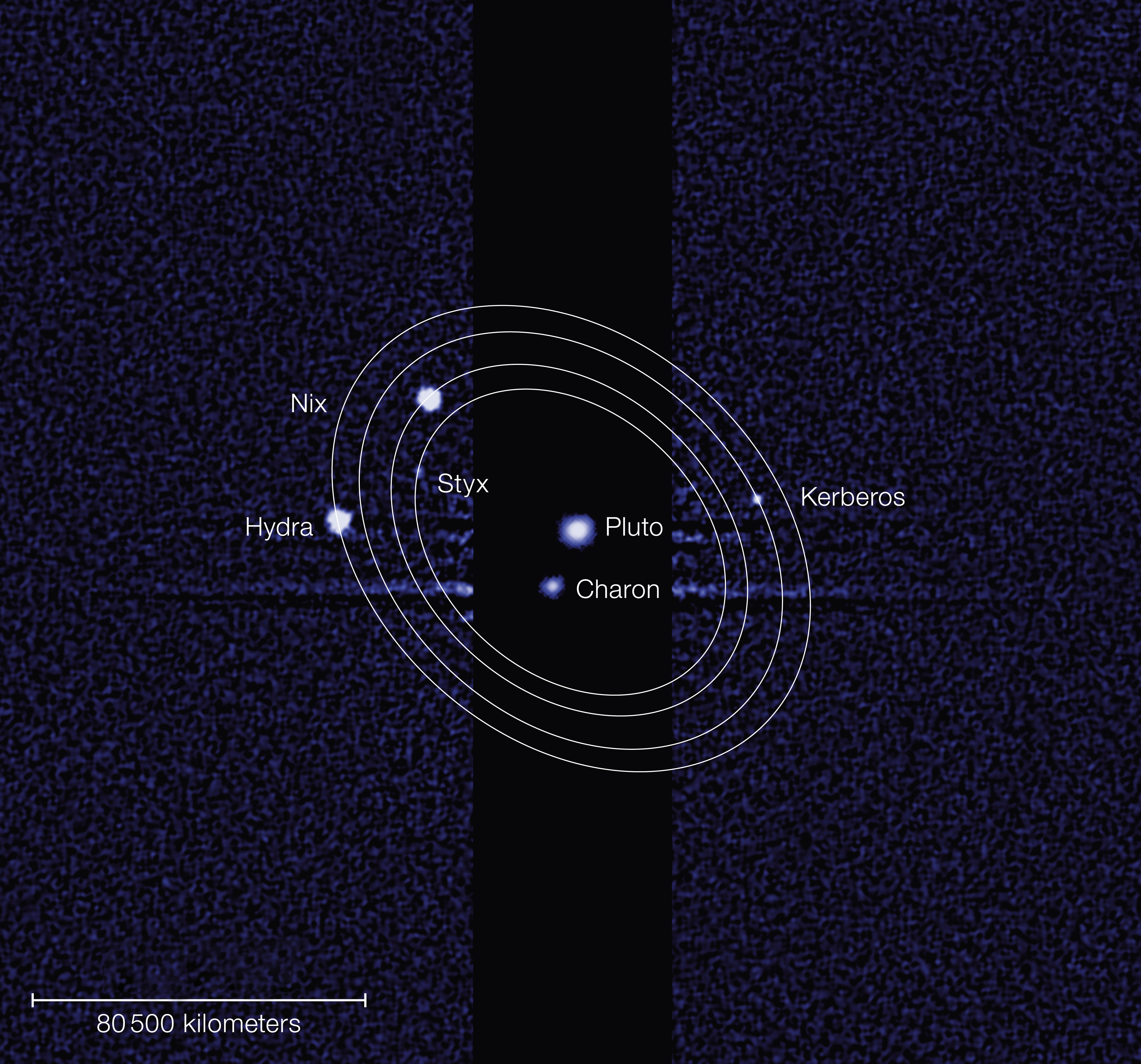
Pluto and its five moons.

The name of Pluto's moon Charon was suggested by James W. Christy, its discoverer, soon after its discovery.

The other four moons are named Hydra, Nix, Kerberos, and Styx.

Charon, Hydra, Nix, and Kerberos are all characters in Greek mythology, with ties to Hades (the Greek equivalent of Pluto). Charon ferries the dead across the River Acheron, Hydra guards the waters of the underworld, Nix (a respelling of Nyx) is the mother of Charon and the goddess of darkness and the night, and Kerberos (a respelling of Cerberus) is a giant three-headed dog who guards the entrance to the underworld. The fifth moon is named for the river Styx that forms the boundary between the worlds of the living and the dead.

=== Eris ===
The name of Eris's moon Dysnomia was suggested by its discoverer Michael E. Brown, who also suggested the name of the dwarf planet. The name has two meanings: in mythology Dysnomia (lawlessness) is the daughter of Eris (chaos). However, the name is also an intentional reference to the actor Lucy Lawless who plays the character Xena. The background for this is that during the long period when Eris had no formal name, the name 'Xena' – originally Brown's nickname for his discovery – spread and became popular. When the name 'Eris' was chosen, Brown suggested Dysnomia (which until then had been referred to as Gabrielle) as a reference to this. Hence, Dysnomia is the only moon which could be said to be named after an actor. The names Eris and Dysnomia were accepted by the IAU on 14 September 2006.

=== Haumea ===
The name of Haumea and its moons were suggested by David L. Rabinowitz of Caltech and refer to the mother goddess and her daughters in Hawaiian mythology.

=== Gonggong ===
When the discoverers of Gonggong proposed choices for a public vote on its name, they chose figures that had associates that could provide a name for the satellite. Xiangliu's name was chosen by its discovery team led by Csaba Kiss. The name refers to the venomous nine-headed snake monster and minister of Gonggong who brings floods and destruction in Chinese mythology.

=== Quaoar ===
Quaoar was named after the creator god of the Tongva tribe. Brown, who had co-discovered both Quaoar and its moon, left the name of the moon up to the Tongva. The Tongva chose the sky god Weywot, son of Quaoar.

=== Orcus ===
On 23 March 2009, Brown asked readers of his weekly column to suggest possible names for the satellite of Orcus which he had codiscovered, with the best one to be submitted to the International Astronomical Union (IAU) on 5 April. The name Vanth, the winged Etruscan psychopomp who guides the souls of the dead to the underworld, was chosen from among a large pool of submissions. Vanth was the only suggestion that was purely Etruscan in origin. It was the most popular submission, first suggested by Sonya Taaffe.

The Etruscan Vanth is frequently portrayed in the company of Charun (Charon), and so as the name of the moon of Orcus (nicknamed the "anti-Pluto" because resonance with Neptune keeps it on the opposite side of the Sun from Pluto), it is an allusion to the parallels between Orcus and Pluto. Brown quoted Taaffe as saying that if Vanth "accompanies dead souls from the moment of death to the underworld itself, then of course her face is turned always toward Orcus", a reference to the likely synchronous orbit of Vanth about Orcus.

=== Asteroids and other trans-Neptunian objects ===
Unlike the planets and dwarf planets, relatively few moons orbiting asteroids have been named. Among them are the following:

Name of moon	Name of primary	Roman numeral
Dactyl	243 Ida	I
Echidna	42355 Typhon	I
Linus	22 Kalliope	I
Menoetius	617 Patroclus	I
Petit-Prince	45 Eugenia	I
Phorcys	65489 Ceto	I
Remus	87 Sylvia	II
Romulus	87 Sylvia	I
Sawiskera	88611 Teharonhiawako	I
Zoe	58534 Logos	I

== Roman numeral designations ==
The Roman numbering system for satellites arose with the very first discovery of natural satellites other than Earth's Moon: Galileo referred to the Galilean moons as I through IV (counting from Jupiter outward), refusing to adopt the names proposed by his rival Simon Marius. Similar numbering schemes naturally arose with the discovery of multiple moons around Saturn, Uranus, and Mars. The numbers initially designated the moons in orbital sequence, and were re-numbered after each new discovery; for instance, before the discovery of Mimas and Enceladus in 1789, Tethys was Saturn I, Dione Saturn II, etc., but after the new moons were discovered, Mimas became Saturn I, Enceladus Saturn II, Tethys Saturn III and Dione Saturn IV.

In the middle of the 19th century, however, the numeration became fixed, and later discoveries failed to conform with the orbital sequence scheme. Amalthea, discovered in 1892, was labelled "Jupiter V" although it orbits more closely to Jupiter than does Io (Jupiter I). The unstated convention then became, at the close of the 19th century, that the numbers more or less reflected the order of discovery, except for prior historical exceptions (see Timeline of discovery of Solar System planets and their natural satellites); though if a large number of satellites were discovered in a short span of time, the group could be numbered in orbital sequence, or according to other principles than strictly by order of discovery. The convention has been extended to natural satellites of minor planets, such as (87) Sylvia I Romulus. The outer irregular satellites of Jupiter (VI through XII) were left officially unnamed throughout this period, although as stated above some unofficial names were used in some contexts.

From 1975 to 2009, the International Astronomical Union was assigning names to all planetary satellites, and Roman numerals were usually not assigned to satellites until they are named. (An exception is Saturn's moon Helene, which received the Roman numeral XII in 1982, but was not named until 1988.) During this period, the use of Roman numeral designations diminished, and some are very rarely used; Phobos and Deimos are rarely referred to as Mars I and Mars II, and the Moon is never referred to as "Earth I". However, since 2015 some moons have again been numbered without being named, starting from Jupiter LI.

The thirteen named satellites of Saturn from Aegir to Surtur were named in alphabetical order corresponding to their Roman numerals.

== Provisional designations ==
When satellites are first discovered, they are given provisional designations such as "S/2010 J 2" (the 2nd new satellite of Jupiter discovered in 2010) or "S/2003 S 1" (the 1st new satellite of Saturn discovered in 2003). The initial "S/" stands for "satellite", and distinguishes from such prefixes as "D/", "C/", and "P/", used for comets. The designation "R/" is used for planetary rings. These designations are sometimes written like "S/2003 S1", dropping the second space. The letter following the category and year identifies the planet (Jupiter, Saturn, Uranus, Neptune; although no occurrence of the other planets is expected, Mars and Mercury are disambiguated through the use of Hermes for the latter). Pluto was designated by P prior to its recategorization as a dwarf planet. When the object is found around a minor planet, the identifier used is the latter's number in parentheses. Thus, Dactyl, the moon of 243 Ida, was at first designated "S/1993 (243) 1". Once confirmed and named, it became (243) Ida I Dactyl. Similarly, the fourth satellite of Pluto, Kerberos, discovered after Pluto was categorized as a dwarf planet and assigned a minor planet number, was designated S/2011 (134340) 1 rather than S/2011 P 1, though the New Horizons team, who maintained that dwarf planets were planets, used the latter.

- H = Mercury (Hermes)
- V = Venus
- E = Earth
- M = Mars
- J = Jupiter
- S = Saturn
- U = Uranus
- N = Neptune

Note: The assignation of "H" for Mercury is specified by the USGS Gazetteer of Planetary Nomenclature; since they usually follow IAU guidelines closely, this is very likely the IAU convention, but confirmation is needed: there have been no moons found to be orbiting Mercury as of yet.

After a few months or years, when a newly discovered satellite's existence has been confirmed and its orbit computed, a permanent name is chosen, which replaces the "S/" provisional designation. However, in the past, some satellites remained unnamed for surprisingly long periods after their discovery.

== Timeline ==
The timeline only includes moons of the planets and the more likely dwarf planets. Ceres (no moons), Orcus, Pluto, Haumea, Quaoar, Makemake (unnamed moon), Gonggong, Eris, and Sedna (no moons) are generally agreed among astronomers to be dwarf planets. Salacia and Varda are more controversial.

=== Pre-IAU names ===
The following names were adopted by informal processes preceding the assumption by the IAU of control over the assignment of satellite nomenclature in 1973.

Pre-IAU Names
Date	Namer	Name	Image	Planet/Number Designation	Discovery date	References/Notes
17th century
1614	Simon Marius	Io		Jupiter I	1610	Marius (Simon Mayr), in his book Mundus Iovialis anno M.DC.IX Detectus Ope Perspicilli Belgici, names the Galilean moons, and attributes the suggestion to Johannes Kepler.
1614	Simon Marius	Europa		Jupiter II	1610	Marius (Simon Mayr), in his book Mundus Iovialis anno M.DC.IX Detectus Ope Perspicilli Belgici, names the Galilean moons, and attributes the suggestion to Johannes Kepler.
1614	Simon Marius	Ganymede		Jupiter III	1610	Marius (Simon Mayr), in his book Mundus Iovialis anno M.DC.IX Detectus Ope Perspicilli Belgici, names the Galilean moons, and attributes the suggestion to Johannes Kepler.
1614	Simon Marius	Callisto		Jupiter IV	1610	Marius (Simon Mayr), in his book Mundus Iovialis anno M.DC.IX Detectus Ope Perspicilli Belgici, names the Galilean moons, and attributes the suggestion to Johannes Kepler.
19th century
1847	John Herschel	Mimas		Saturn I	1789	Herschel named the seven known satellites of Saturn in his book Results of Astronomical Observations made at the Cape of Good Hope, as reported by William Lassell, Monthly Notices of the Royal Astronomical Society, Vol. 8, No. 3, pp. 42–43 January 14, 1848
1847	John Herschel	Enceladus		Saturn II	1789	Herschel named the seven known satellites of Saturn in his book Results of Astronomical Observations made at the Cape of Good Hope, as reported by William Lassell, Monthly Notices of the Royal Astronomical Society, Vol. 8, No. 3, pp. 42–43 January 14, 1848
1847	John Herschel	Tethys		Saturn III	1684	Herschel named the seven known satellites of Saturn in his book Results of Astronomical Observations made at the Cape of Good Hope, as reported by William Lassell, Monthly Notices of the Royal Astronomical Society, Vol. 8, No. 3, pp. 42–43 January 14, 1848
1847	John Herschel	Dione		Saturn IV	1684	Herschel named the seven known satellites of Saturn in his book Results of Astronomical Observations made at the Cape of Good Hope, as reported by William Lassell, Monthly Notices of the Royal Astronomical Society, Vol. 8, No. 3, pp. 42–43 January 14, 1848
1847	John Herschel	Rhea		Saturn V	1672	Herschel named the seven known satellites of Saturn in his book Results of Astronomical Observations made at the Cape of Good Hope, as reported by William Lassell, Monthly Notices of the Royal Astronomical Society, Vol. 8, No. 3, pp. 42–43 January 14, 1848
1847	John Herschel	Titan		Saturn VI	1655	Herschel named the seven known satellites of Saturn in his book Results of Astronomical Observations made at the Cape of Good Hope, as reported by William Lassell, Monthly Notices of the Royal Astronomical Society, Vol. 8, No. 3, pp. 42–43 January 14, 1848
1847	John Herschel	Iapetus		Saturn VIII	1671	Herschel named the seven known satellites of Saturn in his book Results of Astronomical Observations made at the Cape of Good Hope, as reported by William Lassell, Monthly Notices of the Royal Astronomical Society, Vol. 8, No. 3, pp. 42–43 January 14, 1848
1848	William Lassell	Hyperion		Saturn VII	1847	Lassell, following John Herschel's suggested scheme, names Hyperion Discovery of a New Satellite of Saturn, Monthly Notices of the Royal Astronomical Society, Vol. 8, No. 9, pp. 195–197.
1852	John Herschel	Ariel		Uranus I	1851	Herschel named the four known satellites of Uranus in Astronomische Nachrichten, Vol. 34, No. 812, pp. 325/326, 21 June 1852 (communication dated 26 May 1852.)
1852	John Herschel	Umbriel		Uranus II	1851	Herschel named the four known satellites of Uranus in Astronomische Nachrichten, Vol. 34, No. 812, pp. 325/326, 21 June 1852 (communication dated 26 May 1852.)
1852	John Herschel	Titania		Uranus III	1787	Herschel named the four known satellites of Uranus in Astronomische Nachrichten, Vol. 34, No. 812, pp. 325/326, 21 June 1852 (communication dated 26 May 1852.)
1852	John Herschel	Oberon		Uranus IV	1787	Herschel named the four known satellites of Uranus in Astronomische Nachrichten, Vol. 34, No. 812, pp. 325/326, 21 June 1852 (communication dated 26 May 1852.)
1878	Asaph Hall	Phobos		Mars I	1877	Hall named his two newly discovered satellites of Mars Phobus and Deimus: Astronomische Nachrichten, Vol. 92, No. 2187, pp. 47/48 14 March 1878 (signed 7 February 1878). The names were subsequently amended to Phobos and Deimos.
1878	Asaph Hall	Deimos		Mars II	1877	Hall named his two newly discovered satellites of Mars Phobus and Deimus: Astronomische Nachrichten, Vol. 92, No. 2187, pp. 47/48 14 March 1878 (signed 7 February 1878). The names were subsequently amended to Phobos and Deimos.
1880	Camille Flammarion	Triton		Neptune I	1846	Flammarion suggested the name Triton in his 1880 book Astronomie populaire, p. 591. The name was considered unofficial for decades afterwards.
c. 1893	Camille Flammarion	Amalthea		Jupiter V	1892	Flammarion suggested the name Amalthea in correspondence with discoverer E. E. Barnard. Barnard declined to propose any name, however, and Amalthea remained an unofficial name until its adoption by the IAU in 1975.
April 1899	William Henry Pickering	Phoebe		Saturn IX	1899	Pickering suggested the name Phoebe in A New Satellite of Saturn, Astrophysical Journal, Vol. 9, No. 4, pp. 274–276, April 1899, by his brother Edward C. Pickering.
20th century
April 1939	Seth Barnes Nicholson declines to name satellites of Jupiter he has discovered (Publications of the Astronomical Society of the Pacific, Vol. 51, No. 300, pp. 85–94, signed March 1939)					
June 1949	Gerard P. Kuiper	Miranda		Uranus V	1948	Kuiper proposed the name Miranda in his report of the discovery, The Fifth Satellite of Uranus, Publications of the Astronomical Society of the Pacific, Vol. 61, No. 360, p. 129, June 1949.
August 1949	Gerard P. Kuiper	Nereid		Neptune II	1949	Kuiper proposed the name Nereid in his report of the discovery, The second satellite of Neptune, Publications of the Astronomical Society of the Pacific, Vol. 61, No. 361, pp. 175–176, August 1949.
1 February 1967	Audouin Dollfus	Janus		Saturn X	1966	Dollfus named Janus in a report of 1 February 1967 relating to its discovery (IAUC 1995: Saturn X (Janus)).

=== IAU names ===
The following names were selected through a formal process controlled by the IAU. Only in a few cases is the person who chose the name identified.

==== 20th century ====
IAU Names - 20th century
Date	Name	Image	Planet/Number Designation	Discovery date	References/Notes
7 October 1975	Himalia		Jupiter VI	1904	IAUC 2846: Satellites of Jupiter. Also confirmed the name Amalthea.
7 October 1975	Elara		Jupiter VII	1905	IAUC 2846: Satellites of Jupiter. Also confirmed the name Amalthea.
7 October 1975	Pasiphaë		Jupiter VIII	1908	IAUC 2846: Satellites of Jupiter. Also confirmed the name Amalthea.
7 October 1975	Sinope		Jupiter IX	1914	IAUC 2846: Satellites of Jupiter. Also confirmed the name Amalthea.
7 October 1975	Lysithea		Jupiter X	1938	IAUC 2846: Satellites of Jupiter. Also confirmed the name Amalthea.
7 October 1975	Carme		Jupiter XI	1938	IAUC 2846: Satellites of Jupiter. Also confirmed the name Amalthea.
7 October 1975	Ananke		Jupiter XII	1951	IAUC 2846: Satellites of Jupiter. Also confirmed the name Amalthea.
7 October 1975	Leda		Jupiter XIII	1974	IAUC 2846: Satellites of Jupiter. Also confirmed the name Amalthea.
1982	Thebe		Jupiter XIV	1979	Transactions of the International Astronomical Union, Vol. XVIIIA, 1982. Mentioned in IAUC 3872 (in 1983). Also confirmed the name Janus. Saturn XII was also numbered at this time, but left unnamed as "Dione B". In the 1982 announcement Thebe and Adrastea were mistakenly swapped.
1982	Adrastea		Jupiter XV	1979	Transactions of the International Astronomical Union, Vol. XVIIIA, 1982. Mentioned in IAUC 3872 (in 1983). Also confirmed the name Janus. Saturn XII was also numbered at this time, but left unnamed as "Dione B". In the 1982 announcement Thebe and Adrastea were mistakenly swapped.
1982	Metis		Jupiter XVI	1979	Transactions of the International Astronomical Union, Vol. XVIIIA, 1982. Mentioned in IAUC 3872 (in 1983). Also confirmed the name Janus. Saturn XII was also numbered at this time, but left unnamed as "Dione B". In the 1982 announcement Thebe and Adrastea were mistakenly swapped.
1982	Epimetheus		Saturn XI	1980	Transactions of the International Astronomical Union, Vol. XVIIIA, 1982. Mentioned in IAUC 3872 (in 1983). Also confirmed the name Janus. Saturn XII was also numbered at this time, but left unnamed as "Dione B". In the 1982 announcement Thebe and Adrastea were mistakenly swapped.
1982	Telesto		Saturn XIII	1980	Transactions of the International Astronomical Union, Vol. XVIIIA, 1982. Mentioned in IAUC 3872 (in 1983). Also confirmed the name Janus. Saturn XII was also numbered at this time, but left unnamed as "Dione B". In the 1982 announcement Thebe and Adrastea were mistakenly swapped.
1982	Calypso		Saturn XIV	1980	Transactions of the International Astronomical Union, Vol. XVIIIA, 1982. Mentioned in IAUC 3872 (in 1983). Also confirmed the name Janus. Saturn XII was also numbered at this time, but left unnamed as "Dione B". In the 1982 announcement Thebe and Adrastea were mistakenly swapped.
30 September 1983	Atlas		Saturn XV	1980	IAUC 3872: Satellites of Jupiter and Saturn
3 January 1986	Prometheus		Saturn XVI	1980	IAUC 4157: Satellites of Saturn and Pluto
3 January 1986	Pandora		Saturn XVII	1980	IAUC 4157: Satellites of Saturn and Pluto
3 January 1986	Charon		Pluto I	1978	IAUC 4157: Satellites of Saturn and Pluto. James W. Christy announced the name Charon shortly after his discovery of the satellite in 1978, but the name remained unofficial until its adoption by the IAU in 1986.
8 June 1988 (numbered 1982)	Helene		Saturn XII	1980	IAUC 4609: Satellites of Saturn and Uranus
8 June 1988	Cordelia		Uranus VI	1986	IAUC 4609: Satellites of Saturn and Uranus
8 June 1988	Ophelia		Uranus VII	1986	IAUC 4609: Satellites of Saturn and Uranus
8 June 1988	Bianca		Uranus VIII	1986	IAUC 4609: Satellites of Saturn and Uranus
8 June 1988	Cressida		Uranus IX	1986	IAUC 4609: Satellites of Saturn and Uranus
8 June 1988	Desdemona		Uranus X	1986	IAUC 4609: Satellites of Saturn and Uranus
8 June 1988	Juliet		Uranus XI	1986	IAUC 4609: Satellites of Saturn and Uranus
8 June 1988	Portia		Uranus XII	1986	IAUC 4609: Satellites of Saturn and Uranus
8 June 1988	Rosalind		Uranus XIII	1986	IAUC 4609: Satellites of Saturn and Uranus
8 June 1988	Belinda		Uranus XIV	1986	IAUC 4609: Satellites of Saturn and Uranus
8 June 1988	Puck		Uranus XV	1985	IAUC 4609: Satellites of Saturn and Uranus
16 September 1991	Pan		Saturn XVIII	1990	IAUC 5347: Satellites of Saturn and Neptune
16 September 1991	Naiad		Neptune III	1989	IAUC 5347: Satellites of Saturn and Neptune
16 September 1991	Thalassa		Neptune IV	1989	IAUC 5347: Satellites of Saturn and Neptune
16 September 1991	Despina		Neptune V	1989	IAUC 5347: Satellites of Saturn and Neptune
16 September 1991	Galatea		Neptune VI	1989	IAUC 5347: Satellites of Saturn and Neptune
16 September 1991	Larissa		Neptune VII	1989	IAUC 5347: Satellites of Saturn and Neptune
16 September 1991	Proteus		Neptune VIII	1989	IAUC 5347: Satellites of Saturn and Neptune
30 April 1998	Caliban		Uranus XVI	1997	B. J. Gladman, P. D. Nicholson, J. A. Burns, J. J. Kavelaars, B. G. Marsden, G. V. Williams and W. B. Offutt propose the names Caliban and Sycorax in their account of the discovery: Gladman, B. J.; Nicholson, P. D.; Burns, J. A.; Kavelaars, J. J.; Marsden, B. G.; Williams, G. V.; Offutt, W. B. (1998). "Discovery of two distant irregular moons of Uranus". Nature. 392 (6679): 897–899. Bibcode:1998Natur.392..897G. doi:10.1038/31890. S2CID 4315601.. IAUC 7132: Satellites of Uranus (The IAU appears to have adopted these names prior to those reported in IAUC 7479.)
30 April 1998	Sycorax		Uranus XVII	1997	
21 August 2000	Prospero		Uranus XVIII	1999	IAUC 7479: Satellites of Uranus
21 August 2000	Setebos		Uranus XIX	1999	IAUC 7479: Satellites of Uranus
21 August 2000	Stephano		Uranus XX	1999	IAUC 7479: Satellites of Uranus

==== 21st century ====
For completeness, moons that were left unnamed upon their official numbering have also been included.

IAU Names - 21st century
Date	Name	Image	Planet/Number Designation	Discovery date	References/Notes
22 October 2002	Callirrhoe		Jupiter XVII	1999	IAUC 7998: Satellites of Jupiter
22 October 2002	Themisto		Jupiter XVIII	2000	IAUC 7998: Satellites of Jupiter
22 October 2002	Megaclite		Jupiter XIX	2001	Spelled "Magaclite" in IAUC 7998; corrected 29 November 2002 in IAUC 8023: Satellites of Jupiter.
22 October 2002	Taygete		Jupiter XX	2001	IAUC 7998: Satellites of Jupiter
22 October 2002	Chaldene		Jupiter XXI	2001	IAUC 7998: Satellites of Jupiter
22 October 2002	Harpalyke		Jupiter XXII	2000	IAUC 7998: Satellites of Jupiter
22 October 2002	Kalyke		Jupiter XXIII	2001	IAUC 7998: Satellites of Jupiter
22 October 2002	Iocaste		Jupiter XXIV	2001	IAUC 7998: Satellites of Jupiter
22 October 2002	Erinome		Jupiter XXV	2001	IAUC 7998: Satellites of Jupiter
22 October 2002	Isonoe		Jupiter XXVI	2001	IAUC 7998: Satellites of Jupiter
22 October 2002	Praxidike		Jupiter XXVII	2001	IAUC 7998: Satellites of Jupiter
8 August 2003	Autonoe		Jupiter XXVIII	2002	IAUC 8177: Satellites of Jupiter, Saturn, Uranus
8 August 2003	Thyone		Jupiter XXIX	2002	IAUC 8177: Satellites of Jupiter, Saturn, Uranus
8 August 2003	Hermippe		Jupiter XXX	2002	IAUC 8177: Satellites of Jupiter, Saturn, Uranus
8 August 2003	Aitne		Jupiter XXXI	2002	IAUC 8177: Satellites of Jupiter, Saturn, Uranus
8 August 2003	Eurydome		Jupiter XXXII	2002	IAUC 8177: Satellites of Jupiter, Saturn, Uranus
8 August 2003	Euanthe		Jupiter XXXIII	2002	IAUC 8177: Satellites of Jupiter, Saturn, Uranus
8 August 2003	Euporie		Jupiter XXXIV	2002	IAUC 8177: Satellites of Jupiter, Saturn, Uranus
8 August 2003	Orthosie		Jupiter XXXV	2002	IAUC 8177: Satellites of Jupiter, Saturn, Uranus
8 August 2003	Sponde		Jupiter XXXVI	2002	IAUC 8177: Satellites of Jupiter, Saturn, Uranus
8 August 2003	Kale		Jupiter XXXVII	2002	IAUC 8177: Satellites of Jupiter, Saturn, Uranus
8 August 2003	Pasithee		Jupiter XXXVIII	2002	IAUC 8177: Satellites of Jupiter, Saturn, Uranus
8 August 2003	Ymir		Saturn XIX	2000	IAUC 8177: Satellites of Jupiter, Saturn, Uranus
8 August 2003	Paaliaq		Saturn XX	2000	IAUC 8177: Satellites of Jupiter, Saturn, Uranus
8 August 2003	Tarvos		Saturn XXI	2000	IAUC 8177: Satellites of Jupiter, Saturn, Uranus
8 August 2003	Ijiraq		Saturn XXII	2000	IAUC 8177: Satellites of Jupiter, Saturn, Uranus
8 August 2003	Suttungr		Saturn XXIII	2000	Spelled "Suttung" in IAUC 8177; emended on 21 January 2005 in IAUC 8471: Satellites of Saturn.
8 August 2003	Kiviuq		Saturn XXIV	2000	IAUC 8177: Satellites of Jupiter, Saturn, Uranus
8 August 2003	Mundilfari		Saturn XXV	2000	IAUC 8177: Satellites of Jupiter, Saturn, Uranus
8 August 2003	Albiorix		Saturn XXVI	2000	IAUC 8177: Satellites of Jupiter, Saturn, Uranus
8 August 2003	Skathi		Saturn XXVII	2000	Spelled "Skadi" in IAUC 8177; emended on 21 January 2005 in IAUC 8471: Satellites of Saturn.
8 August 2003	Erriapus		Saturn XXVIII	2000	Spelled "Erriapo" in IAUC 8177; corrected on 14 December 2007 (USGS)
8 August 2003	Siarnaq		Saturn XXIX	2000	IAUC 8177: Satellites of Jupiter, Saturn, Uranus
8 August 2003	Thrymr		Saturn XXX	2000	Spelled "Thrym" in IAUC 8177; emended on 21 January 2005 in IAUC 8471: Satellites of Saturn.
8 August 2003	Trinculo		Uranus XXI	2002	IAUC 8177: Satellites of Jupiter, Saturn, Uranus
21 January 2005	Narvi		Saturn XXXI	2003	IAUC 8471: Satellites of Saturn
21 January 2005	Methone		Saturn XXXII	2004	IAUC 8471: Satellites of Saturn
21 January 2005	Pallene		Saturn XXXIII	2004	IAUC 8471: Satellites of Saturn
21 January 2005	Polydeuces		Saturn XXXIV	2004	IAUC 8471: Satellites of Saturn
30 March 2005	Hegemone		Jupiter XXXIX	2003	IAUC 8502: Satellites of Jupiter
30 March 2005	Mneme		Jupiter XL	2003	IAUC 8502: Satellites of Jupiter
30 March 2005	Aoede		Jupiter XLI	2003	IAUC 8502: Satellites of Jupiter
30 March 2005	Thelxinoe		Jupiter XLII	2003	IAUC 8502: Satellites of Jupiter
30 March 2005	Arche		Jupiter XLIII	2002	IAUC 8502: Satellites of Jupiter
30 March 2005	Kallichore		Jupiter XLIV	2003	IAUC 8502: Satellites of Jupiter
30 March 2005	Helike		Jupiter XLV	2003	IAUC 8502: Satellites of Jupiter
30 March 2005	Carpo		Jupiter XLVI	2003	IAUC 8502: Satellites of Jupiter
30 March 2005	Eukelade		Jupiter XLVII	2003	IAUC 8502: Satellites of Jupiter
30 March 2005	Cyllene		Jupiter XLVIII	2003	IAUC 8502: Satellites of Jupiter
29 December 2005	Francisco		Uranus XXII	2006	IAUC 8648: Satellites of Uranus
29 December 2005	Margaret		Uranus XXIII	2006	IAUC 8648: Satellites of Uranus
29 December 2005	Ferdinand		Uranus XXIV	2006	IAUC 8648: Satellites of Uranus
29 December 2005	Perdita		Uranus XXV	2006	IAUC 8648: Satellites of Uranus
29 December 2005	Mab		Uranus XXVI	2006	IAUC 8648: Satellites of Uranus
29 December 2005	Cupid		Uranus XXVII	2006	IAUC 8648: Satellites of Uranus
21 June 2006	Nix		Pluto II	2005	IAUC 8723: Satellites of Pluto
21 June 2006	Hydra		Pluto III	2005	IAUC 8723: Satellites of Pluto
17 July 2006	Daphnis		Saturn XXXV	2005	IAUC 8730: Saturn XXXV (Daphnis) = S/2005 S 1
13 September 2006	Dysnomia		Eris I	2005	IAUC 8747: (134340) Pluto, (136199) Eris, and (136199) Eris I (Dysnomia)
3 February 2007	Halimede		Neptune IX	2002	IAUC 8802: Satellites of Neptune
3 February 2007	Psamathe		Neptune X	2003	IAUC 8802: Satellites of Neptune
3 February 2007	Sao		Neptune XI	2002	IAUC 8802: Satellites of Neptune
3 February 2007	Laomedeia		Neptune XII	2002	IAUC 8802: Satellites of Neptune
3 February 2007	Neso		Neptune XIII	2002	IAUC 8802: Satellites of Neptune
5 April 2007	Kore		Jupiter XLIX	2003	IAUC 8826: Satellites of Jupiter and Saturn
5 April 2007	Aegir		Saturn XXXVI	2004	IAUC 8826: Satellites of Jupiter and Saturn
5 April 2007	Bebhionn		Saturn XXXVII	2004	IAUC 8826: Satellites of Jupiter and Saturn
5 April 2007	Bergelmir		Saturn XXXVIII	2004	IAUC 8826: Satellites of Jupiter and Saturn
5 April 2007	Bestla		Saturn XXXIX	2004	IAUC 8826: Satellites of Jupiter and Saturn
5 April 2007	Farbauti		Saturn XL	2004	IAUC 8826: Satellites of Jupiter and Saturn
5 April 2007	Fenrir		Saturn XLI	2004	IAUC 8826: Satellites of Jupiter and Saturn
5 April 2007	Fornjot		Saturn XLII	2004	IAUC 8826: Satellites of Jupiter and Saturn
5 April 2007	Hati		Saturn XLIII	2004	IAUC 8826: Satellites of Jupiter and Saturn
5 April 2007	Hyrrokkin		Saturn XLIV	2004	Spelled "Hyrokkin" in IAUC 8826; corrected on 31 July 2007 in IAUC 8860: Saturn XLIV (Hyrrokkin)
5 April 2007	Kari		Saturn XLV	2006	IAUC 8826: Satellites of Jupiter and Saturn
5 April 2007	Loge		Saturn XLVI	2006	IAUC 8826: Satellites of Jupiter and Saturn
5 April 2007	Skoll		Saturn XLVII	2006	IAUC 8826: Satellites of Jupiter and Saturn
5 April 2007	Surtur		Saturn XLVIII	2006	IAUC 8826: Satellites of Jupiter and Saturn
20 September 2007	Anthe		Saturn XLIX	2007	IAUC 8873: Satellites of Saturn
20 September 2007	Jarnsaxa		Saturn L	2006	IAUC 8873: Satellites of Saturn
20 September 2007	Greip		Saturn LI	2006	IAUC 8873: Satellites of Saturn
20 September 2007	Tarqeq		Saturn LII	2007	IAUC 8873: Satellites of Saturn
17 September 2008	Hiʻiaka		Haumea I	2005	
17 September 2008	Namaka		Haumea II	2005	
5 May 2009	Aegaeon		Saturn LIII	2009	IAUC 9041: New name/designation of satellite of Saturn (LIII), S/2008 S 1. (subscription only)
4 October 2009	Weywot		Quaoar I	2006	MPC 67220: New Names of Minor Planets
11 November 2009	Herse		Jupiter L	2003	IAUC 9094: Designation and name assigned to S/2003 J 17 (the 50th satellite of Jupiter to be so designated and named): Jupiter L (Herse). (subscription only)
30 March 2010	Vanth		Orcus I	2005	MPC 69496: New Names of Minor Planets
18 February 2011	Actaea		Salacia I	2006	MPC 73984: New Names of Minor Planets
2 July 2013	Kerberos		Pluto IV	2011	IAU1303 News Release
2 July 2013	Styx		Pluto V	2012	IAU1303 News Release
16 January 2014	Ilmarë		Varda I	2009	MPC 86715: New Names of Minor Planets
7 March 2015	(unnamed)		Jupiter LI	2010	CBET (Central Bureau Electronic Telegram) 4075: 20150307: Satellites of Jupiter, March 7, 2015 (subscription only)
7 March 2015	(unnamed)		Jupiter LII	2010	CBET (Central Bureau Electronic Telegram) 4075: 20150307: Satellites of Jupiter, March 7, 2015 (subscription only)
7 March 2015	Dia		Jupiter LIII	2000	CBET (Central Bureau Electronic Telegram) 4075: 20150307: Satellites of Jupiter, March 7, 2015 (subscription only)
9 June 2017 (numbered); 19 August 2019 (named)	(unnamed)		Jupiter LIV	2016	MPC 105280: Numbering of Natural Satellites; Names Approved for Five Jovian Satellites
9 June 2017 (numbered); 19 August 2019 (named)	(unnamed)		Jupiter LV	2003	MPC 105280: Numbering of Natural Satellites; Names Approved for Five Jovian Satellites
9 June 2017 (numbered); 19 August 2019 (named)	(unnamed)		Jupiter LVI	2011	MPC 105280: Numbering of Natural Satellites; Names Approved for Five Jovian Satellites
9 June 2017 (numbered); 19 August 2019 (named)	Eirene		Jupiter LVII	2003	MPC 105280: Numbering of Natural Satellites; Names Approved for Five Jovian Satellites
9 June 2017 (numbered); 19 August 2019 (named)	Philophrosyne		Jupiter LVIII	2003	MPC 105280: Numbering of Natural Satellites; Names Approved for Five Jovian Satellites
9 June 2017 (numbered); 19 August 2019 (named)	(unnamed)		Jupiter LIX	2017	MPC 105280: Numbering of Natural Satellites; Names Approved for Five Jovian Satellites
5 October 2017 (numbered); 19 August 2019 (named)	Eupheme		Jupiter LX	2003	MPC 106505: Numbering of a Natural Satellite; Names Approved for Five Jovian Satellites
25 September 2018 (numbered); 3 October 2018 (named)	(unnamed)		Jupiter LXI	2003	MPC 111804: Numbering of Natural Satellites; Name Approved for Jovian Satellite: Valetudo; Names Approved for Five Jovian Satellites; Name Approved for Neptunian Satellite: Hippocamp
25 September 2018 (numbered); 3 October 2018 (named)	Valetudo		Jupiter LXII	2016	MPC 111804: Numbering of Natural Satellites; Name Approved for Jovian Satellite: Valetudo; Names Approved for Five Jovian Satellites; Name Approved for Neptunian Satellite: Hippocamp
25 September 2018 (numbered); 19 August 2019 (named)	(unnamed)		Jupiter LXIII	2017	MPC 111804: Numbering of Natural Satellites; Name Approved for Jovian Satellite: Valetudo; Names Approved for Five Jovian Satellites; Name Approved for Neptunian Satellite: Hippocamp
25 September 2018 (numbered); 19 August 2019 (named)	(unnamed)		Jupiter LXIV	2017	MPC 111804: Numbering of Natural Satellites; Name Approved for Jovian Satellite: Valetudo; Names Approved for Five Jovian Satellites; Name Approved for Neptunian Satellite: Hippocamp
25 September 2018 (numbered); 19 August 2019 (named)	Pandia		Jupiter LXV	2017	MPC 111804: Numbering of Natural Satellites; Name Approved for Jovian Satellite: Valetudo; Names Approved for Five Jovian Satellites; Name Approved for Neptunian Satellite: Hippocamp
25 September 2018 (numbered); 19 August 2019 (named)	(unnamed)		Jupiter LXVI	2017	MPC 111804: Numbering of Natural Satellites; Name Approved for Jovian Satellite: Valetudo; Names Approved for Five Jovian Satellites; Name Approved for Neptunian Satellite: Hippocamp
25 September 2018 (numbered); 19 August 2019 (named)	(unnamed)		Jupiter LXVII	2017	MPC 111804: Numbering of Natural Satellites; Name Approved for Jovian Satellite: Valetudo; Names Approved for Five Jovian Satellites; Name Approved for Neptunian Satellite: Hippocamp
25 September 2018 (numbered); 19 August 2019 (named)	(unnamed)		Jupiter LXVIII	2017	MPC 111804: Numbering of Natural Satellites; Name Approved for Jovian Satellite: Valetudo; Names Approved for Five Jovian Satellites; Name Approved for Neptunian Satellite: Hippocamp
25 September 2018 (numbered); 19 August 2019 (named)	(unnamed)		Jupiter LXIX	2017	MPC 111804: Numbering of Natural Satellites; Name Approved for Jovian Satellite: Valetudo; Names Approved for Five Jovian Satellites; Name Approved for Neptunian Satellite: Hippocamp
25 September 2018 (numbered); 19 August 2019 (named)	(unnamed)		Jupiter LXX	2017	MPC 111804: Numbering of Natural Satellites; Name Approved for Jovian Satellite: Valetudo; Names Approved for Five Jovian Satellites; Name Approved for Neptunian Satellite: Hippocamp
25 September 2018 (numbered); 19 August 2019 (named)	Ersa		Jupiter LXXI	2018	MPC 111804: Numbering of Natural Satellites; Name Approved for Jovian Satellite: Valetudo; Names Approved for Five Jovian Satellites; Name Approved for Neptunian Satellite: Hippocamp
25 September 2018 (numbered); 19 August 2019 (named)	(unnamed)		Jupiter LXXII	2011	MPC 111804: Numbering of Natural Satellites; Name Approved for Jovian Satellite: Valetudo; Names Approved for Five Jovian Satellites; Name Approved for Neptunian Satellite: Hippocamp
25 September 2018 (numbered); 20 February 2019 (named)	Hippocamp		Neptune XIV	2013	MPC 111804: Numbering of Natural Satellites; Name Approved for Jovian Satellite: Valetudo; Names Approved for Five Jovian Satellites; Name Approved for Neptunian Satellite: Hippocamp
5 February 2020	Xiangliu		Gonggong I	2016	MPC 121135: New Names of Minor Planets
1 June 2021 (numbered); 24 August 2022 (named)	Gridr		Saturn LIV	2019	MPC 132212: Numbering of a Natural Satellite; Names Approved for 10 Small Satellites of Saturn
10 August 2021 (numbered); 24 August 2022 (named)	Angrboda		Saturn LV	2019	MPC 133821: Numbering of Natural Satellites; Names Approved for 10 Small Satellites of Saturn
10 August 2021 (numbered); 24 August 2022 (named)	Skrymir		Saturn LVI	2019	MPC 133821: Numbering of Natural Satellites; Names Approved for 10 Small Satellites of Saturn
10 August 2021 (numbered); 24 August 2022 (named)	Gerd		Saturn LVII	2019	MPC 133821: Numbering of Natural Satellites; Names Approved for 10 Small Satellites of Saturn
10 August 2021 (numbered); 24 August 2022 (named)	(unnamed)		Saturn LVIII	2019	MPC 133821: Numbering of Natural Satellites; Names Approved for 10 Small Satellites of Saturn
10 August 2021 (numbered); 24 August 2022 (named)	Eggther		Saturn LIX	2019	MPC 133821: Numbering of Natural Satellites; Names Approved for 10 Small Satellites of Saturn
10 August 2021 (numbered); 24 August 2022 (named)	(unnamed)		Saturn LX	2019	MPC 133821: Numbering of Natural Satellites; Names Approved for 10 Small Satellites of Saturn
10 August 2021 (numbered); 24 August 2022 (named)	Beli		Saturn LXI	2019	MPC 133821: Numbering of Natural Satellites; Names Approved for 10 Small Satellites of Saturn
10 August 2021 (numbered); 24 August 2022 (named)	Gunnlod		Saturn LXII	2019	MPC 133821: Numbering of Natural Satellites; Names Approved for 10 Small Satellites of Saturn
10 August 2021 (numbered); 24 August 2022 (named)	Thiazzi		Saturn LXIII	2019	MPC 133821: Numbering of Natural Satellites; Names Approved for 10 Small Satellites of Saturn
10 August 2021 (numbered); 24 August 2022 (named)	(unnamed)		Saturn LXIV	2019	MPC 133821: Numbering of Natural Satellites; Names Approved for 10 Small Satellites of Saturn
10 August 2021 (numbered); 24 August 2022 (named)	Alvaldi		Saturn LXV	2019	MPC 133821: Numbering of Natural Satellites; Names Approved for 10 Small Satellites of Saturn
10 August 2021 (numbered); 24 August 2022 (named)	Geirrod		Saturn LXVI	2019	MPC 133821: Numbering of Natural Satellites; Names Approved for 10 Small Satellites of Saturn
24 March 2026 (numbered)	(unnamed)		Uranus XXVIII	2025	MPEC 2026-F170 : Numbering of regular satellite Uranus XXVIII
14 April 2026 (numbered)	(unnamed)		Jupiter LXXIII	2003	M.P.C. 194209
14 April 2026 (numbered)	(unnamed)		Saturn LXVII	2004	M.P.C. 194209

== Other references ==
- Astronomical Headlines
- Astronomical headlines (old)
- Gazetteer of Planetary Nomenclature

== See also ==
- Timeline of discovery of Solar System planets and their moons
- Astronomical naming conventions
- Provisional designation in astronomy
- Planetary nomenclature
- Name conflicts of solar system objects
