= Kallichore =

Kallichore may refer to:

- Kallichore (mythology), a character from Greek Mythology
- Kallichore (moon), a moon of Jupiter
