= Isonoe (moon) =

Moon of Jupiter

- Isonoe imaged by the Canada-France-Hawaii Telescope in December 2001

Discovery
- Discovered by: Scott S. Sheppard; David C. Jewitt; Yanga R. Fernandez; Eugene A. Magnier
- Discovery site: Mauna Kea Observatory
- Discovery date: 23 November 2000

Designations
- Designation: Jupiter XXVI
- Pronunciation: /aɪˈsɒnoʊ.iː/
- Named after: Ισονόη Isonoē
- Alternative names: S/2000 J 6
- Adjectives: Isonoean /ˌaɪsənoʊˈiːən/

Orbital characteristics
- Epoch 23 March 2018 (JD 2458200.5)
- Observation arc: 24 years 2024-12-03 (last obs)
- Semi-major axis: 0.1559024 AU (23,322,670 km)
- Eccentricity: 0.2263119
- Orbital period (sidereal): –688.61 d
- Mean anomaly: 148.53423°
- Mean motion: 0° 31^{m} 36.216^{s} / day
- Inclination: 164.45891° (to ecliptic)
- Longitude of ascending node: 203.99552°
- Argument of perihelion: 219.75296°
- Satellite of: Jupiter
- Group: Carme group

Physical characteristics
- Mean diameter: 4 km
- Albedo: 0.04 (assumed)
- Spectral type: D
- Apparent magnitude: 22.5
- Absolute magnitude (H): 15.9 (82 obs)

Isonoe /aɪˈsɒnoʊ.iː/, also known as Jupiter XXVI, is a little retrograde irregular satellite of Jupiter.

== Discovery and Naming ==
It was discovered by a team of astronomers from the University of Hawaiʻi led by Scott S. Sheppard in 2000, and given the temporary designation S/2000 J 6.

It was named in October 2002 after Isonoe, one of the Danaïdes in Greek mythology, and a lover of Zeus (Jupiter).

== Orbit ==
Isonoe orbits Jupiter at an average distance of 23,322,670 km in 691,62 days, at an inclination of 165° to the ecliptic, in a retrograde direction and with an eccentricity of 0.226.

It belongs to the Carme group, made up a tightly of irregular retrograde moons orbiting Jupiter at a distance ranging between 22.7–23.5 million km, at an inclination of about 165°, and eccentricities between 0.24 and 0.28.

== Physical characteristics ==
Isonoe's estimated diameter is 4 kilometers, assuming an albedo of 4%.

Like the other members of the Carme group (Exception Kalyke) it is light red in color (B–V = 0.78 ± 0.05, V–R = 0.53 ± 0.04), similar to D-type asteroids.

== Origin ==
Isonoe probably did not form near Jupiter but was captured by Jupiter later. Like the other members of the Carme group, which have similar orbits, Isonoe is probably the remnant of a broken, captured heliocentric asteroid.
