= Nysiads =

Nymphs in Greek mythology

In Greek mythology, the Nysiads or Nysiades (Ancient Greek: Νυσιάδες, lit. 'of Mount Nysa' or 'Nymphs of Mount Nysa') were Oceanid nymphs of mythical Mount Nysa. Zeus entrusted the infant god Dionysus to their care, and the Nysiads raised him with the assistance of the old satyr-god Silenus. When Dionysus was grown, the Nysiads joined his company as the first of the Maenads.

== Names ==
The names of the nymphs include:

- Ambrosia
- Arsinoe
- Bromia or Bromis
- Cisseis
- Coronis
- Erato
- Eriphia
- Nysa
- Pedile
- Polymno or Polyhymno

Also mentioned are Callichore and Calyce (after whom two moons of Jupiter, Kallichore and Kalyke, are named).

In later tellings of Dionysus's infancy, the Nysiades appear to be identified with the Hyades. The term might have been used for the Pleiades and the Hyades as Dionysus's tutors altogether.
