= Taygete (moon) =

Moon of Jupiter

- Taygete imaged by the Canada-France-Hawaii Telescope in December 2001

Discovery
- Discovered by: Scott S. Sheppard; David C. Jewitt; Yanga R. Fernandez; Eugene A. Magnier
- Discovery site: Mauna Kea Observatory
- Discovery date: 25 November 2000

Designations
- Designation: Jupiter XX
- Pronunciation: /teɪˈɪdʒətiː/
- Named after: Τᾱϋγέτη Tāÿgetē
- Alternative names: S/2000 J 9
- Adjectives: Taygetean /ˌteɪədʒəˈtiːən/

Orbital characteristics
- Epoch 23 March 2018 (JD 2458200.5)
- Observation arc: 25 years 2025-12-21 (last obs)
- Semi-major axis: 0.1507123 AU (22,546,240 km)
- Eccentricity: 0.2487538
- Orbital period (sidereal): –691.62 d
- Mean anomaly: 150.90619°
- Mean motion: 0° 31^{m} 13.862^{s} / day
- Inclination: 165.95236° (to ecliptic)
- Longitude of ascending node: 14.91608°
- Argument of perihelion: 283.34358°
- Satellite of: Jupiter
- Group: Carme group

Physical characteristics
- Mean diameter: 5 km
- Albedo: 0.04 (assumed)
- Spectral type: D
- Apparent magnitude: 21.9
- Absolute magnitude (H): 15.5

Taygete /teɪˈɪdʒətiː/, also known as Jupiter XX, and provisionally designated S/2000 J 9, is a very small retrograde irregular satellite of Jupiter.

== Discovery and naming ==
It was discovered by a team of astronomers from the University of Hawaiʻi led by Scott S. Sheppard, in 2000, and given the temporary designation S/2000 J 9.

It was named in October 2002 after Taygete, one of the Pleiades, daughter of the Titan Atlas and mother of Lacedaemon by Zeus (Jupiter).

== Orbit ==
Taygete orbits Jupiter at an average distance of 23.3 million kilometers in 732 days, at an inclination of 165° to the ecliptic, in a retrograde direction and with an eccentricity of 0.248.

It belongs to the Carme group, made up a tightly of irregular retrograde moons orbiting Jupiter at a distance ranging between 22.7–23.5 million km, at an inclination of about 165°, and eccentricities between 0.24 and 0.28.

== Physical characteristics ==
Taygete's estimated diameter is 5 kilometers, assuming an albedo of 4%.

Like most other members of the Carme group (the exception is Kalyke), it is light red in color (B−V=0.56, V−R=0.52), similar to D-type asteroids.

== Origin ==
Taygete probably did not form near Jupiter but was captured by Jupiter later. Much like the other members of the Carme group, which have similar orbits, Taygete is likely to be the remnant of a broken, captured heliocentric asteroid.
