= Kallichore (moon) =

Moon of Jupiter

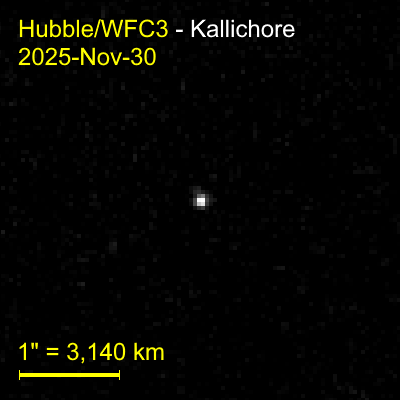
- Kallichore imaged by the Hubble Space Telescope on 30 November 2025

Discovery
- Discovered by: Scott S. Sheppard
- Discovery site: Mauna Kea Obs.
- Discovery date: 6 February 2003

Designations
- Designation: Jupiter XLIV (44)
- Pronunciation: /kəˈlɪkɒriː/
- Named after: Καλλιχόρη Kallichorē
- Alternative names: S/2003 J 11
- Adjectives: Kallichorean /ˌkælɪkəˈriːən/

Orbital characteristics
- Observation arc: 18 years
- Satellite of: Jupiter
- Group: Carme group

Proper orbital elements
- Proper semi-major axis: 23,017,100 km (0.153860 AU)
- Proper eccentricity: 0.253
- Proper inclination: 164.7° (to ecliptic)
- Proper orbital period: 1.95 years (713.59 d)
- Precession of perihelion long.: 15017.3812 arcsec / yr
- Precession of asc. node: 26395.112 arcsec / yr

Physical characteristics
- Mean diameter: 3.8+2.3 −0.3 km
- Albedo: 0.037+0.007 −0.022
- Apparent magnitude: 22.5 to 23.0 (R and V bands)
- Absolute magnitude (H): 16.192±0.013 (HST) (Note: Visual absolute magnitude of Kallichore computed using Hubble Space Telescope (HST) observations, in the AB magnitude system.); 16.15 (MPC) (Note: Visual absolute magnitude of Kallichore computed by the Minor Planet Center (MPC), using 50 observations.)

Kallichore (/kəˈlɪkɒriː/), also known as Jupiter XLIV and previously as S/2003 J 11, is a small natural satellite or moon of Jupiter. It is one of Jupiter's many irregular moons, which orbit far from the planet on highly inclined and eccentric orbits. Kallichore was discovered by Scott S. Sheppard on 6 February 2003 and was named after Callichore, one of Zeus's daughters in Greek mythology.

Kallichore is an elongated object with a diameter of about 4 km (2.5 mi). It orbits Jupiter in the retrograde direction—opposite to the direction of the planet's rotation—at an average distance of 23.0 million km (14.3 million mi). Kallichore shares similar orbital properties as Jupiter's larger irregular moon Carme, which makes it a member of the Carme group. The moons of the Carme group are believed to be fragments of an asteroid or trans-Neptunian object that was gravitationally captured by Jupiter and destroyed by a collision several billion years ago.

Kallichore is a potential flyby target for the European Space Agency's Jupiter Icy Moons Explorer (Juice) mission, which is predicted to pass closer than 1 million km (0.62 million mi) from the moon on 7 October 2031. Although it is possible for Juice to come even closer to Kallichore, this possibility remains under investigation as of 2026. Further observations of Kallichore are planned to accurately determine its orbital path before Juice can be directed closer to the moon.

== Discovery ==
Discovery images of Kallichore from the Canada–France–Hawaii Telescope on 6 February 2003

Kallichore was discovered by Scott S. Sheppard on 6 February 2003, during a search for distant moons of Jupiter at Mauna Kea Observatory in Hawaii. Conducted in collaboration with David Jewitt, the search involved routine imaging of the sky near Jupiter using various large telescopes equipped with sensitive digital cameras. Sheppard made the discovery observations of Kallichore using the 3.6-meter (12 ft) Canada–France–Hawaii Telescope, while Brian G. Marsden computed the orbit of Kallichore from Sheppard's observational data. The discovery of Kallichore, together with S/2003 J 9, S/2003 J 10, and S/2003 J 12, was announced by the Minor Planet Center and Central Bureau of Astronomical Telegrams on 7 March 2003. Kallichore was one of the 21 Jovian moons announced in 2003, which raised Jupiter's known moon count to 61 in that year.

== Name ==
When the discovery of Kallichore was announced, it was given the temporary provisional designation S/2003 J 11. The moon was officially named "Kallichore" with the Roman numeral designation Jupiter XLIV (Jupiter 44) by the International Astronomical Union's (IAU's) Working Group for Planetary System Nomenclature on 30 March 2005. The moon's name comes from Callichore, one of the Muses and one of Zeus's daughters in Greek mythology. The name follows the IAU's naming convention for Jovian moons, which are named after mythological lovers and descendants of Zeus or Jupiter. Since Kallichore has a retrograde orbit, it was given a name ending with the letter "e".

== Orbit ==
Kallichore is an irregular moon of Jupiter, meaning it follows a very wide, inclined, and eccentric orbit around the planet. The orbit of Kallichore is retrograde, meaning it orbits in the opposite direction to Jupiter's rotation. The moon orbits Jupiter at an average distance of 23.0 million km (14.3 million mi; 0.154 AU), which places it far beyond the Galilean moons. Like all other irregular moons of Jupiter, Kallichore orbits far enough that its orbit is strongly influenced by gravitational perturbations by the Sun and other giant planets, which causes frequent changes in its orbit. As a result, Kallichore's orbit does not form a closed ellipse. Proper (or mean) orbital elements are often used to describe the general shape and orientation of the orbits of irregular moons like Kallichore.

On average, Kallichore has an orbital period of about 714 days (1.95 years) with an orbital eccentricity of 0.259 and an inclination of 164.6° with respect to the ecliptic. Simulations over a 1,000-year timescale show that Kallichore's orbital semi-major axis varies from 22.0 to 24.4 million km (13.7 to 15.2 million mi), while Kallichore's eccentricity and inclination vary from 0.113 to 0.413 and 160.8° to 167.8°, respectively. Kallichore's orbit exhibits nodal and apsidal precession with periods of 86.3 and 49.1 years, respectively. A 2011 study by Julien Frouard and colleagues found that Kallichore's orbit appears to be influenced by a secular resonance involving the nodal and apsidal precession frequencies of itself, Saturn, Uranus, and Neptune. (Note: Frouard et al. (2011) describe Kallichore's secular resonance as a "450000 year libration of the angle $s + 10\nu_{GI} + 4g_6 + 4s_7 + 20s_8 + s_6$", where $s$ is Kallichore's nodal precession frequency, $\nu_{GI} = 2n_5 - 5n_6 = -1467 \text{ arcsec/yr}$ is the "Great Inequality" between the mean motions (orbital frequency $n$) of Jupiter (subscript 5) and Saturn (subscript 6), $g_6$ is the apsidal precession frequency of Saturn, $s_7$ is the nodal precession frequency of Uranus, $s_8$ is the nodal precession frequency of Neptune, and $s_6$ is the nodal precession frequency of Saturn.)

Oblique view of Kallichore's orbit (red), with the Galilean moons (magenta) and other irregular moons of Jupiter (gray) plotted

Side view of Kallichore's orbit (red), with the Galilean moons (magenta) and other irregular moons of Jupiter (gray) plotted

Top view of Kallichore's orbit (red), with the Galilean moons (magenta) and other irregular moons of Jupiter (gray) plotted

=== Group membership and origin ===
Kallichore shares similar orbital characteristics as Jupiter's large irregular moon Carme, which makes it a member of the Carme group. The moons of the Carme group are believed to be fragments of a larger body that was gravitationally captured by Jupiter and destroyed by a collision several billion years ago. Based on the known colors and compositions of moons from the Carme group, the group's parent body likely originated from the outer Solar System, either as a D-type asteroid from the Hilda or Jupiter trojan populations or from the centaur and trans-Neptunian object populations.

== Physical characteristics ==
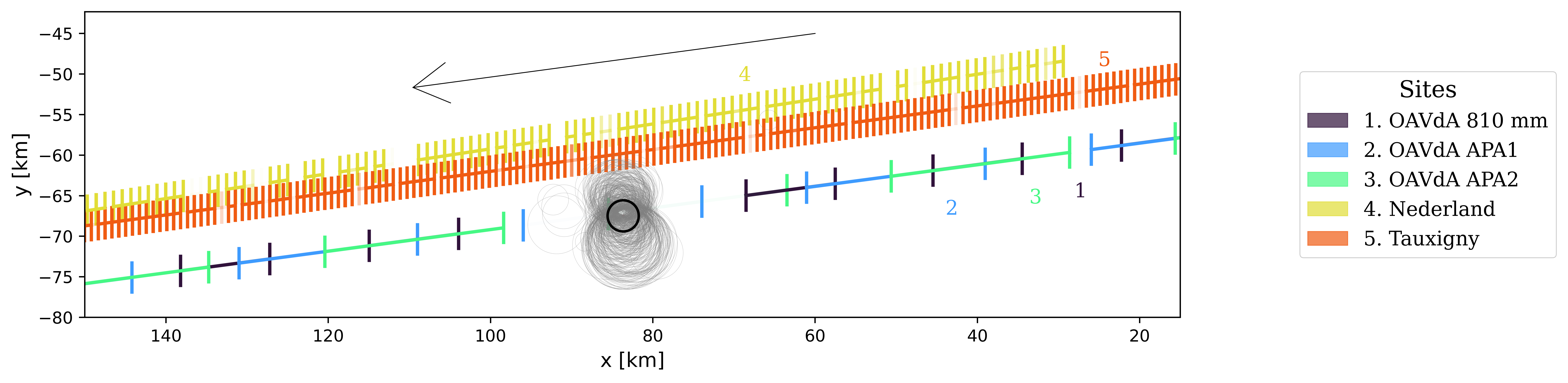
The silhouette of Kallichore as seen during a stellar occultation on 15 December 2025. Kallichore's position is indicated by the black circle (with gray circles representing possible alternative sizes and positions for Kallichore) in the empty gap between the colored chords (representing observations of the star occulted by Kallichore).

Due to its small size, Kallichore appears very faint from Earth with a visual apparent magnitude of around 23, so it could only be observed by very large, sensitive telescopes. Observations of a stellar occultation from 2025 show that Kallichore is between 3.5 km (2.2 mi) and 6.1 km (3.8 mi) in diameter. (Note: 3.5 to 6.1 km represent the lower and upper bounds of Kallichore's diameter value of 3.8+2.3 −0.3 km.) Kallichore's size and low brightness suggest it has a dark surface with a geometric albedo of around 3.7%+0.7%
−2.2%. Kallichore is expected to share similar properties as other moons of the Carme group, such as their slightly reddish surface colors (V–R = 0.47), organic-rich surface compositions, and low albedos of around 4%. Kallichore may additionally contain water ice, though most of it is expected to be buried beneath a layer of dark, refractory material.

Kallichore is irregularly shaped because it is too small for its gravity to pull itself into a sphere. The Hubble Space Telescope has observed changes in Kallichore's brightness (magnitude change of Δm ≥ 0.461±0.073) within 1.25 hours, which suggests the moon has a moderately elongated shape with a minimum semi-axis ratio of a/b ≥ 1.53±0.10. This elongated shape is expected for a kilometer-sized body that has been shaped by collisions. Since Kallichore is thought to have been shaped by collisions, it is suspected to have a rubble pile interior structure, similar to those of the kilometer-sized asteroids 162173 Ryugu and 101955 Bennu. The rotation period of Kallichore is unknown because its brightness changes have not been observed long enough.

== Potential exploration ==
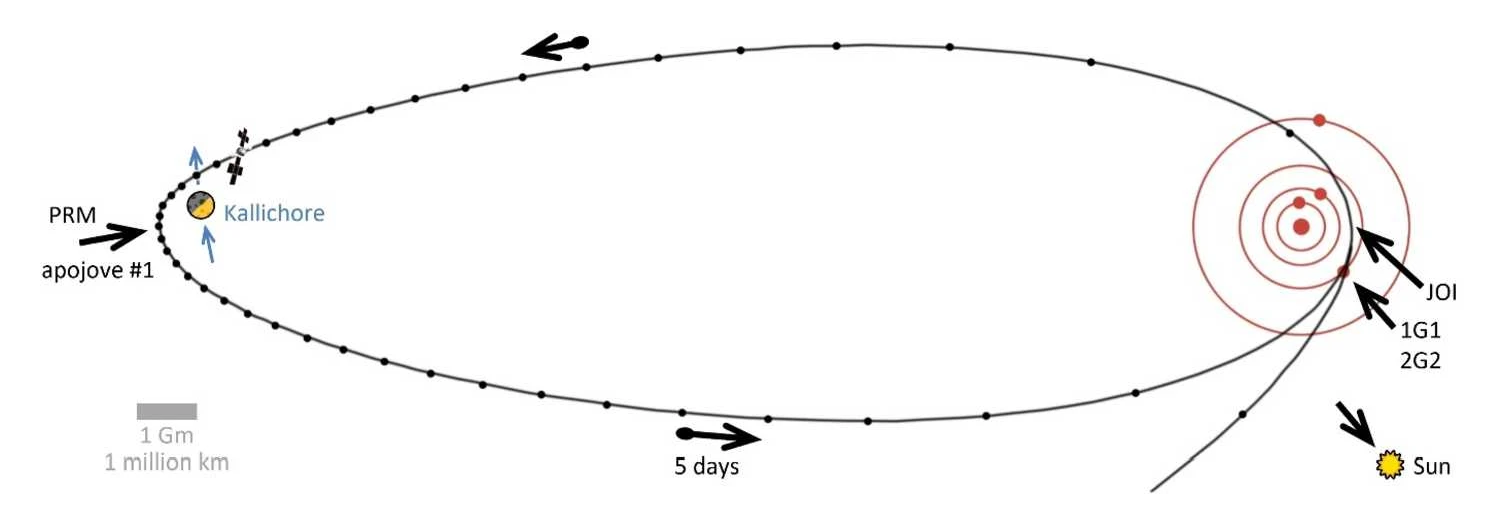
Trajectory of Juice during its first orbit around Jupiter in 2031. At its farthest point from Jupiter, the spacecraft is predicted to approach Kallichore from its unilluminated side.

Kallichore has been identified as a potential flyby target for the European Space Agency's Jupiter Icy Moons Explorer (Juice) mission, which is predicted to pass closer than 1 million km (0.62 million mi) from the moon on 7 October 2031, during the spacecraft's first orbit around Jupiter. A 2026 study by Arnaud Boutonnet and Amedeo Rocchi determined that the Juice spacecraft could come even closer to Kallichore if it expended at least 23 m/s of delta-v (Δv) during its energy reduction phase (or pump-down sequence) after entering orbital insertion around Jupiter. In order for Juice's highest resolution camera (JANUS) to resolve Kallichore beyond one pixel, the spacecraft must come within 100,000 km (62,000 mi) of the moon. One possible trajectory could bring Juice as close as 700 km (430 mi) from Kallichore on 5 October 2031; this flyby would occur near Juice's apojove (farthest point from Jupiter) and the spacecraft would approach Kallichore from its unilluminated side (phase angle ~145°). A flyby this close would allow Juice to resolve Kallichore's shape and surface features.

However, as of March 2026, Kallichore is predicted to have a large positional uncertainty of ±272 km (169 mi) on the date of Juice's expected flyby. Before a decision can be made to direct Juice closer to Kallichore, the moon's positional uncertainty on the flyby date must be reduced to less than ±30 km (19 mi) by 2028. Further observations of Kallichore are planned to accurately determine its orbital path.

=== Preparation ===
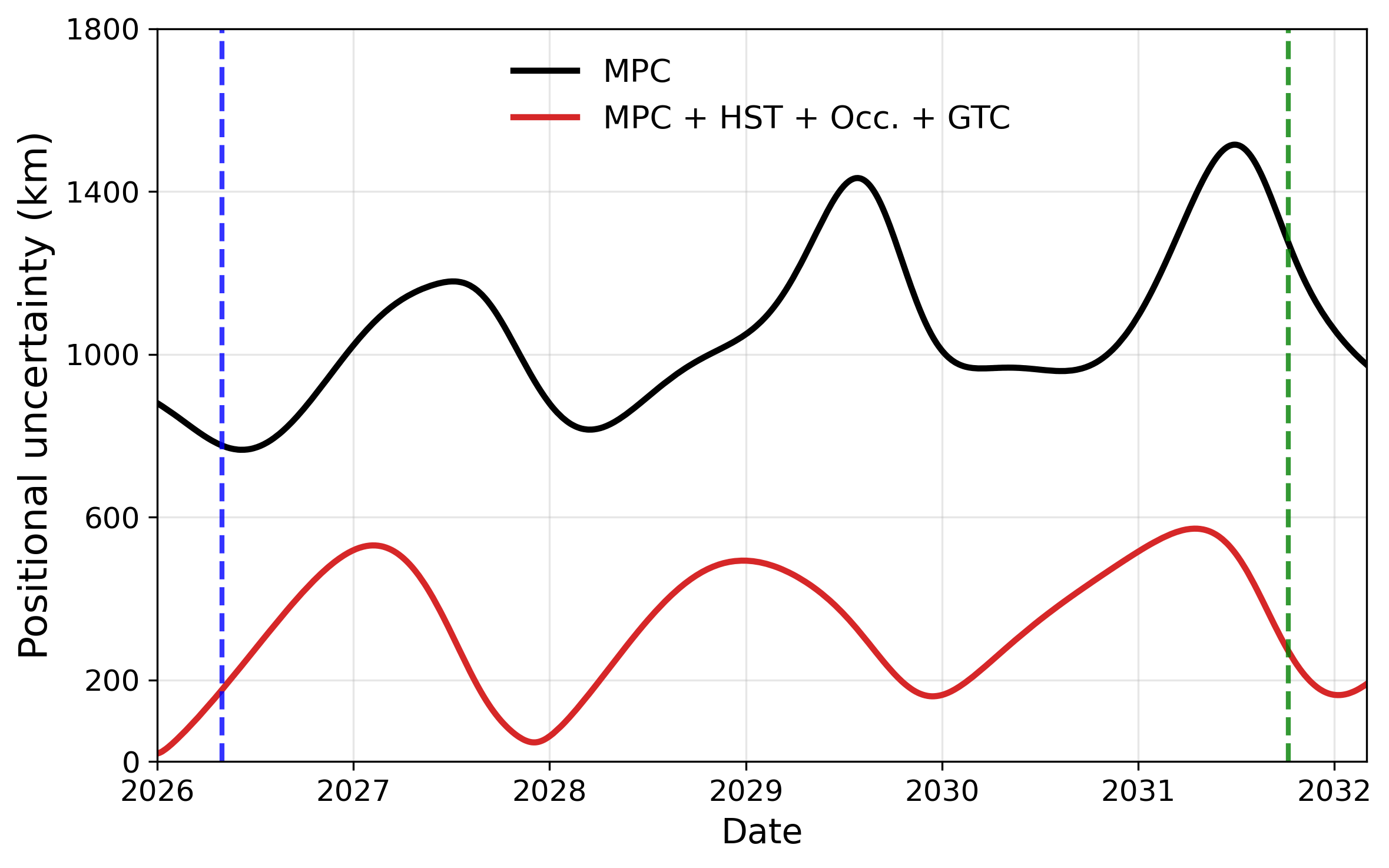
Predicted positional uncertainty of Kallichore from 2026 to 2032, without vs. with observations after 2026 (black and red, respectively). The green dashed vertical line marks the expected date of Juice's flyby of Kallichore.

Beginning in 2025, astronomers on behalf of the Juice mission team began conducting a series of astrometric observations to better determine Kallichore's orbital path. Kallichore was imaged by the Hubble Space Telescope on 30 November and 4 December 2025, which refined Kallichore's orbit enough to facilitate the prediction of a stellar occultation by the moon on 15 December 2025. Kallichore's December 2025 occultation was successfully detected by three telescopes in Italy, alongside ten non-detections from Europe and the United States, which altogether significantly constrained Kallichore's size and position. These observations make Kallichore the smallest irregular moon observed by stellar occultation as of 2026. Kallichore was further imaged by the 10.4 m (34 ft) Gran Telescopio Canarias on 21–22 January 2026. From November 2025 to February 2026, Kallichore's positional uncertainty on the expected Juice flyby date had dropped from 1,544 to 265 km (959 to 165 mi).

Another stellar occultation by Kallichore was predicted to occur over Australia on 18 March 2026. A campaign for observing this occultation was organized by the Instituto de Astrofísica de Andalucía. The campaign aimed to further constrain Kallichore's shape and position.

== See also ==
- Moons of Jupiter
