= S/2003 J 9 =

Moon of Jupiter

- S/2003 J 9 imaged by the Canada-France-Hawaii Telescope during follow-up observations in February 2003

Discovery
- Discovered by: Scott S. Sheppard; David C. Jewitt; Jan T. Kleyna; Yanga R. Fernández
- Discovery site: Mauna Kea Obs.
- Discovery date: 6 February 2003

Orbital characteristics
- Epoch 17 December 2020 (JD 2459200.5)
- Observation arc: 15.19 yr (5,545 d)
- Semi-major axis: 0.1615575 AU (24,168,660 km)
- Eccentricity: 0.1701900
- Orbital period (sidereal): 2.10 yr (767.60 d)
- Mean anomaly: 109.89836°
- Mean motion: 0° 28^{m} 8.381^{s} / day
- Inclination: 166.33403° (to ecliptic); 13.66597° (retrograde)
- Longitude of ascending node: 130.59522°
- Argument of perihelion: 45.62861°
- Satellite of: Jupiter
- Group: Carme group

Physical characteristics
- Mean diameter: ≈1 km
- Albedo: 0.04 (assumed)
- Apparent magnitude: 23.7
- Absolute magnitude (H): 16.91 (29 obs)

S/2003 J 9 is a retrograde irregular satellite of Jupiter. It was discovered by a team of astronomers from the University of Hawaiʻi led by Scott S. Sheppard in 2003.

S/2003 J 9 is about 1 kilometre in diameter, and orbits Jupiter at an average distance of 0.162 AU (24,200,000 km) in 767.60 days, at an inclination of 166.3° to the ecliptic (166° to Jupiter's equator), in a retrograde direction and with an eccentricity of 0.17.

It belongs to the Carme group, made up of irregular retrograde moons orbiting Jupiter at a distance ranging between 23 and 24 million km and at an inclination of about 165°.

This moon was once considered lost until November 2020, when the Minor Planet Center announced the recovery of S/2003 J 9 by Scott Sheppard in observations from September 2011 to April 2018.
