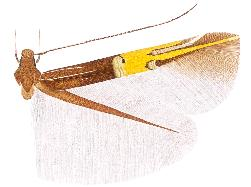

Scientific classification
- Kingdom: Animalia
- Phylum: Arthropoda
- Clade: Pancrustacea
- Class: Insecta
- Order: Lepidoptera
- Family: Cosmopterigidae
- Genus: Cosmopterix
- Species: C. eukelade

Binomial name
- Cosmopterix eukelade Koster, 2010

= Cosmopterix eukelade =

Species of moth

Cosmopterix eukelade is a moth of the family Cosmopterigidae. It is known from Peru.

== Description ==
Female. Forewing length 4.9 mm. Head: frons shining white with greenish and reddish reflections, vertex neck tufts and collar shining olive brown with greenish and reddish reflections; labial palpus first segment very short, white, second segment three-quarters of the length of third, greyish brown with white longitudinal lines laterally and ventrally, third segment white, lined brown laterally, extreme apex white; scape dark brown with a white anterior line, white ventrally, antenna shining dark brown with a white line from base to two-thirds, interrupted in middle, followed towards apex by eleven dark brown segments, nine dark brown with a white line and eighteen dark brown segments at apex. Thorax and tegulae shining olive brown with greenish and reddish gloss. Legs: shining dark brown with reddish gloss, femur of midleg shining ochreous, femur of hindleg shining golden, foreleg with a white line on tibia and tarsal segments one, two and five, tibia of midleg with a white narrow oblique basal line, a white oblique medial line and a white apical ring, tarsal segment one with a lateral white line on the outside, ending dorsally at apex, segment two with a white oblique streak in the distal half and segment five entirely white, tibia of hindleg as midleg, but the markings silvery and with an additional broad pale golden subapical ring and long hair pencils before and after the medial line, tarsal segment four dorsally white at apex and segment five dorsally entirely white, spurs ochreous-white dorsally, dark grey ventrally, tips white. Forewing shining olive brown in basal one-quarter, darker brown towards apex and with reddish gloss, four very narrow white lines in the basal area, a subcostal from base to one-quarter, bending from costa in distal third, a medial above fold, from base to two-fifths, a very short subdorsal from one-fifth, a short dorsal from beyond base to one-fifth, an orange-yellow transverse fascia beyond the middle with a long apical protrusion from the middle and as an apical line to apex, bordered at the inner edge by a tubercular very pale golden metallic fascia with greenish and reddish reflections, subcostally on outside with patch of blackish scales, bordered at the outer edge by two very pale golden tubercular costal and dorsal spots with purplish reflection, the costal spot as a streak of one-quarter wing length, the dorsal spot more or less square and more towards base than the costal, both spots lined brown on the inside, a white costal streak beyond the costal spot, cilia brown, slightly paler towards dorsum. Hindwing shining brown with strong reddish gloss, cilia brown. Underside: forewing shining dark brown, the pale yellow apex line distinctly visible in the cilia as a white streak, hindwing shining dark brown. Abdomen not examined, previously used for dissection.

== Etymology ==
The species is named after Eukelade, a moon of Jupiter. To be treated as a noun in apposition.
