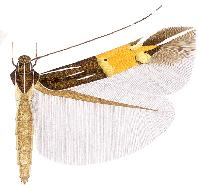

Scientific classification
- Kingdom: Animalia
- Phylum: Arthropoda
- Class: Insecta
- Order: Lepidoptera
- Family: Cosmopterigidae
- Genus: Cosmopterix
- Species: C. taygete

Binomial name
- Cosmopterix taygete Koster, 2010

= Cosmopterix taygete =

Species of moth

Cosmopterix taygete is a moth of the family Cosmopterigidae. It is known from Bahia, Brazil.

Adults have been recorded in January.

== Description ==
Male. Forewing length 3.5 mm. Head: frons shining ochreous-white, vertex dark brown with reddish gloss, laterally and medially lined white, collar dark brown; labial palpus first segment very short, white, second segment four-fifths of the length of third, brown with white longitudinal lines laterally and ventrally, third segment white, lined brown laterally; scape dark brown with a white anterior line, white ventrally, antenna shining dark brown, a white section of two segments at three-quarters, followed towards apex by ten dark brown, three white and four dark brown segments at apex. Thorax dark brown with reddish gloss and a white median line, tegulae dark brown, lined white inwardly. Legs: greyish brown, femora of midleg and hindleg paler, foreleg with a white line on tibia and tarsal segments, tibia of midleg with white oblique basal and medial lines and a white apical ring, tarsal segments one to four with very broad shining white apical rings, segment five entirely white, tibia of hindleg as midleg, first tarsal segment with ochreous-white basal and apical rings, tarsal segments two to four with ochreous-white apical rings, tarsal segment five ochreous-white, spurs white, ventrally with a dark grey streak. Forewing shining dark brown with reddish gloss, four narrow white lines in the basal area, a subcostal from base to one-third, slightly bending from costa distally, a short medial above fold from one-fifth to just beyond the subcostal, a subdorsal about as long as the medial, but further from base, a dorsal from base to one-third, a bright yellowish orange transverse fascia beyond the middle and with an apical protrusion, bordered at the inner edge by a slightly inwardly oblique tubercular golden metallic fascia, not reaching costa, bordered at the outer edge by two tubercular golden metallic costal and dorsal spots, the dorsal spot twice as large as the costal, a small subcostal patch of blackish scales on the outside of pale golden metallic fascia, the costal and the dorsal spots with some dark brown inward lining, a white costal streak apical of the costal spot and a broad shining white apical line from the apical protrusion to apex, cilia dark brown, paler towards dorsum. Hindwing shining dark brownish grey, cilia brownish grey. Underside: forewing shining dark greyish brown, the broad white apical line distinctly visible, hindwing shining brownish grey with a short white streak at apex. Abdomen dorsally dark brown, ventrally paler, anal tuft whitish.

== Etymology ==
The species is named after Taygete, a moon of Jupiter. To be treated as a noun in apposition.
