= Pasithee (moon) =

Moon of Jupiter

- Discovery images of Pasithee by the Canada-France-Hawaii Telescope in December 2001

Discovery
- Discovered by: Scott S. Sheppard; David C. Jewitt; Jan T. Kleyna
- Discovery site: Mauna Kea Observatory
- Discovery date: 11 December 2001

Designations
- Designation: Jupiter XXXVIII
- Pronunciation: /ˈpæsəθiː/
- Named after: Πασιθέα Pāsithea
- Alternative names: S/2001 J 6
- Adjectives: Pasithean /pəˈsɪθiən/

Orbital characteristics
- Epoch 17 December 2020 (JD 2459200.5)
- Observation arc: 16 years 2017-03-26 (last obs)
- Semi-major axis: 0.1535315 AU (22,967,990 km)
- Eccentricity: 0.2097026
- Orbital period (sidereal): –711.12 d
- Mean anomaly: 71.98760°
- Mean motion: 0° 30^{m} 22.488^{s} / day
- Inclination: 164.72796° (to ecliptic)
- Longitude of ascending node: 49.07994°
- Argument of perihelion: 331.51895°
- Satellite of: Jupiter
- Group: Carme group

Physical characteristics
- Mean diameter: 2 km
- Albedo: 0.04 (assumed)
- Apparent magnitude: 23.2
- Absolute magnitude (H): 16.77 (25 obs)

Pasithee /ˈpæsəθiː/, also known as Jupiter XXXVIII, is a retrograde irregular satellite of Jupiter. It was discovered by a team of astronomers from the University of Hawaiʻi led by Scott S. Sheppard in 2001, and given the temporary designation S/2001 J 6.

Pasithee is about 2 kilometres in diameter, and orbits Jupiter at an average distance of 23,307,000 km in 711.12 days, at an inclination of 166° to the ecliptic (164° to Jupiter's equator), in a retrograde direction and with an eccentricity of 0.3289.

It was named in August 2003 after Pasithee, one of the Charites, goddesses of charm, beauty, nature, human creativity and fertility, daughters of Zeus (Jupiter) by Eurynome. Pasithee, better known as Aglaea, is the spouse of Hypnos (Sleep) and presides over hallucinations and hallucinogens.

It belongs to the Carme group, made up of irregular retrograde moons orbiting Jupiter at a distance ranging between 23 and 24 million km and at an inclination of about 165°.
