= S/2003 J 10 =

Moon of Jupiter

- S/2003 J 10 imaged by the Canada-France-Hawaii Telescope during follow-up observations in February 2003

Discovery
- Discovered by: Scott S. Sheppard et al.
- Discovery site: Mauna Kea Obs.
- Discovery date: 6 February 2003

Orbital characteristics
- Epoch 9 August 2022 (JD 2459800.5)
- Observation arc: 21 years 2024-12-03 (last obs)
- Semi-major axis: 0.1527889 AU (22,857,000 km)
- Eccentricity: 0.26997
- Orbital period (sidereal): –1.93 yr (–705.96 d)
- Mean anomaly: 279.42900°
- Mean motion: 0° 30^{m} 35.79^{s} / day
- Inclination: 162.99423° (to ecliptic)
- Longitude of ascending node: 255.22186°
- Argument of perihelion: 302.24985°
- Satellite of: Jupiter
- Group: Carme group

Physical characteristics
- Mean diameter: ≈2 km
- Albedo: 0.04 (assumed)
- Apparent magnitude: 23.6
- Absolute magnitude (H): 16.87 (99 obs)

S/2003 J 10 is a retrograde irregular satellite of Jupiter. It was discovered by a team of astronomers from the University of Hawaiʻi led by Scott S. Sheppard et al. in 2003.

S/2003 J 10 is about 2 kilometres in diameter, and orbits Jupiter at an average distance of 22,857,000 km in approximately 706 days, at an inclination of 163° to the ecliptic, in a retrograde direction and with an eccentricity of 0.34.

It belongs to the Carme group.

This moon was considered lost until its recovery was announced on 12 October 2022.
