= Kale (moon) =

Moon of Jupiter

- Discovery images of Kale by the Canada-France-Hawaii Telescope in December 2001

Discovery
- Discovered by: Scott S. Sheppard; David C. Jewitt; Jan T. Kleyna
- Discovery site: Mauna Kea Observatory
- Discovery date: 9 December 2001

Designations
- Designation: Jupiter XXXVII
- Pronunciation: /ˈkeɪliː/
- Named after: Καλή Kălē
- Alternative names: S/2001 J 8
- Adjectives: Kalean /kəˈliːən/

Orbital characteristics
- Epoch 17 December 2020 (JD 2459200.5)
- Observation arc: 21 years 2022-09-02 (last obs)
- Semi-major axis: 0.1571703 AU (23,512,340 km)
- Eccentricity: 0.2893464
- Orbital period (sidereal): –736.55 d
- Mean anomaly: 31.49453°
- Mean motion: 0° 29^{m} 19.565^{s} / day
- Inclination: 166.17658° (to ecliptic)
- Longitude of ascending node: 153.58621°
- Argument of perihelion: 138.91240°
- Satellite of: Jupiter
- Group: Carme group

Physical characteristics
- Mean diameter: 2 km
- Albedo: 0.04 (assumed)
- Apparent magnitude: 23.0
- Absolute magnitude (H): 16.3

Kale /ˈkeɪliː/, also known as Jupiter XXXVII, is a retrograde irregular satellite of Jupiter. It was discovered in 2001 by astronomers Scott S. Sheppard, D. Jewitt, and J. Kleyna, and was originally designated as S/2001 J 8.

Kale is about 2 kilometres (1.2 miles) in diameter, and orbits Jupiter at an average distance of 22,409 Mm (13,924,000 mi) in 736.55 days, at an inclination of 165° to the ecliptic (166° to Jupiter's equator), in a retrograde direction and with an orbital eccentricity of 0.2011.

It was named in August 2003 after Kale, one of the Charites (Ancient Greek: Χάριτες, Latin: Gratiae, 'Graces'), daughters of Zeus (Jupiter). Kale is the spouse of Hephaestus according to some authors (although most have Aphrodite play that role).

It belongs to the Carme group, made up of irregular retrograde moons orbiting Jupiter at a distance ranging between 23 and 24 Gm (14,000,000–15,000,000 mi) and at an inclination of about 165°.
