= Carme (moon) =

Moon of Jupiter

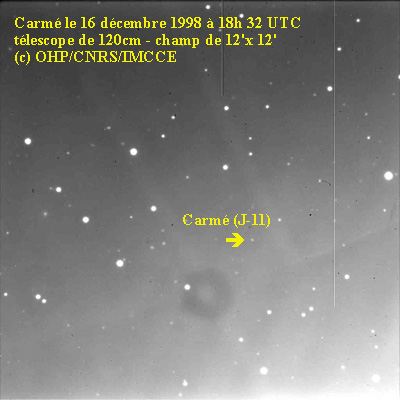
- Carme photographed by the Haute-Provence Observatory in December 1998

Discovery
- Discovered by: Seth B. Nicholson
- Discovery site: Mt. Wilson Observatory
- Discovery date: 30 July 1938

Designations
- Designation: Jupiter XI
- Pronunciation: /ˈkɑːrmiː/
- Named after: Κάρμη Karmē
- Adjectives: Carmean /kɑːrˈmiːən/

Orbital characteristics
- Epoch 17 December 2020 (JD 2459200.5)
- Observation arc: 82.02 yr (29,958 days)
- Semi-major axis: 0.1509370 AU (22,579,850 km)
- Eccentricity: 0.2294925
- Orbital period (sidereal): –693.17 d
- Mean anomaly: 17.48241°
- Mean motion: 0° 31^{m} 9.68^{s} / day
- Inclination: 163.53496° (to ecliptic)
- Longitude of ascending node: 209.94088°
- Argument of perihelion: 133.45035°
- Satellite of: Jupiter
- Group: Carme group

Physical characteristics
- Mean diameter: 46.7±0.9 km
- Mass: 8.69×10^{16} kg (calculated)
- Mean density: 1.63 g/cm^{3} (assumed)
- Synodic rotation period: 10.40±0.05 h 6.48 h
- Albedo: 0.035±0.006
- Spectral type: D
- Apparent magnitude: 18.9
- Absolute magnitude (H): 10.5

Carme /ˈkɑːrmiː/ is one of the largest irregular satellites of Jupiter.

== Discovery and naming ==
Carme observed by the Wide-field Infrared Survey Explorer (WISE) spacecraft in 2014

It was discovered by Seth Barnes Nicholson at Mount Wilson Observatory in California in July 1938.

It is named after the mythological Carme, mother by Zeus of Britomartis, a Cretan goddess. Carme did not receive its present name until 1975; before then, it was simply known as Jupiter XI. It was sometimes called "Pan" between 1955 and 1975 (Pan is now the name of a satellite of Saturn).

== Orbit ==
Carme orbits Jupiter at an average distance of 22,579,859 km in 693.17 days, at an inclination of 165° to the ecliptic, in a retrograde direction and with an eccentricity of 0.23. They are continuously changing due to solar and planetary perturbations.

It gives its name to the Carme group, made up of retrograde irregular moons orbiting Jupiter at distances ranging between 22.7–23.5 million km, at an inclination of about 165°, and eccentricities between 0.24 and 0.28.

== Physical characteristics ==
With a diameter of 46.7±0.9 km (albedo 3.5%), it is the largest member of the Carme group and the fourth-largest irregular moon of Jupiter.

Like the other members of the Carme group (except for Kalyke) it is light red in color (B−V=0.76, V−R=0.47), similar to D-type asteroids.

Carme's spectral shape and absorption features are special and make it unique compared to other satellites. It has a strong upturn in the ultraviolet range with a CN emission at 0.388 μm, possibly indicative of low-level cometary activity. One study found that modelling its surface composition as 4% low-Fe serpentine and 96% kerogen provided a good match. Another study suggested it was composed mainly of amorphous carbon, minnesotaite, and ilmenite.

The rotation period was found to be approximately 10 hours and 24 min. This was regarded by a later paper as uncertain due to the short observation periods. Another group found a different possible rotation period of 6.48 hours.

== Origin ==
Carme probably did not form near Jupiter but was captured by Jupiter later. Like the other members of the Carme group, which have similar orbits, Carme is probably the remnant of a broken, captured heliocentric asteroid.

== See also ==
- Kallichore (moon) – a small Carme group moon that might be visited by the European Space Agency's Jupiter Icy Moons Explorer (Juice) mission in 2031
- Irregular satellites
- Jupiter's moons in fiction
