= Jupiter LI =

Moon of Jupiter

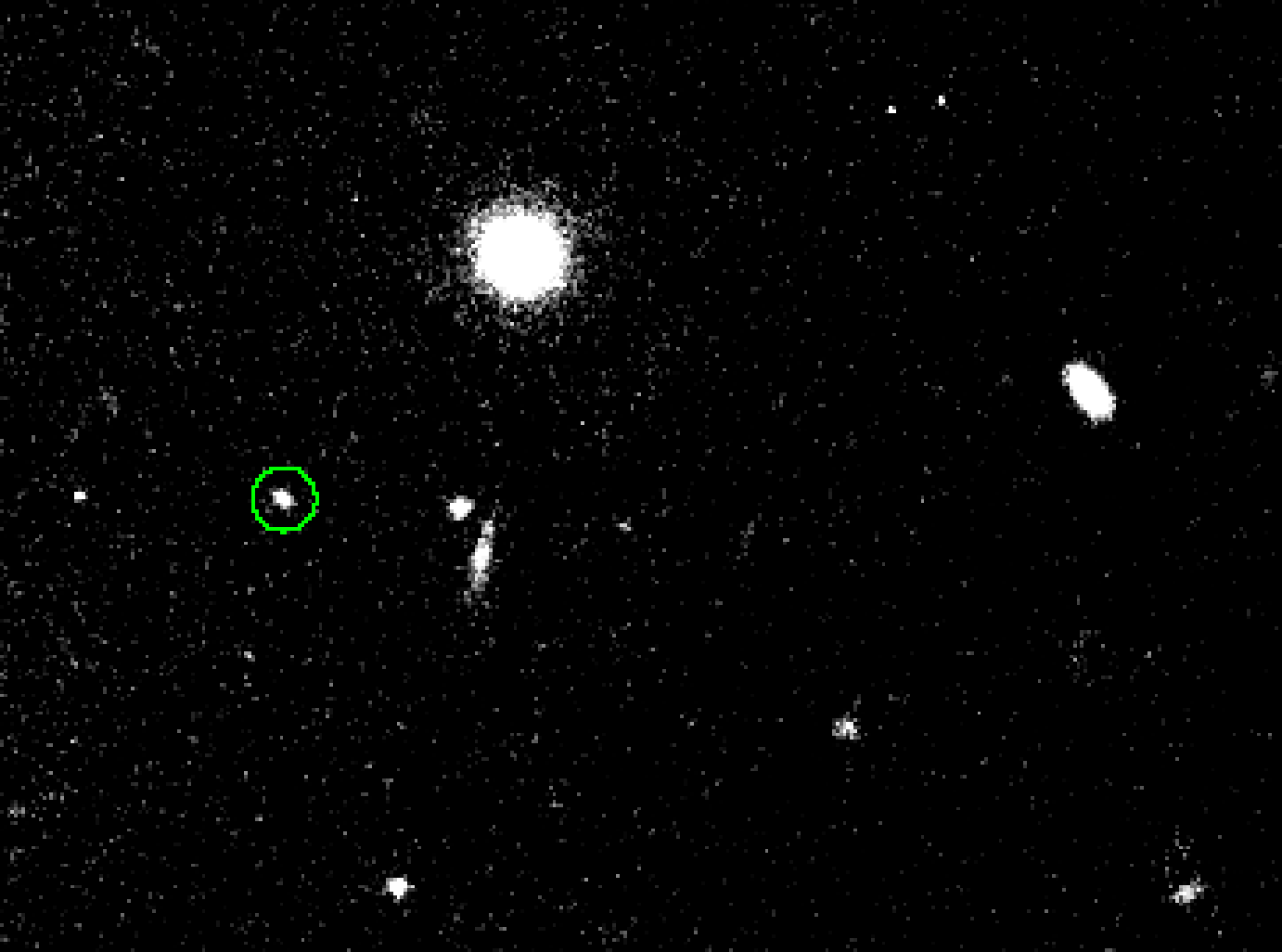
- Jupiter LI imaged by the Canada-France-Hawaii Telescope on 8 September 2020

Discovery
- Discovered by: Robert A. Jacobson; Marina Brozović; Brett Gladman; Mike Alexandersen
- Discovery site: Palomar Obs.
- Discovery date: 7 September 2010

Designations
- Designation: Jupiter LI
- Alternative names: S/2010 J 1

Orbital characteristics
- Observation arc: 22 years 2025-12-21 (last obs)
- Semi-major axis: 23314335 km
- Eccentricity: 0.320
- Orbital period (sidereal): −723.2 days
- Inclination: 163.2°
- Satellite of: Jupiter
- Group: Carme group

Physical characteristics
- Mean diameter: 2 km
- Apparent magnitude: 23.3
- Absolute magnitude (H): 16.15 (169 obs)

Jupiter LI, provisionally known as S/2010 J 1, is a natural satellite of Jupiter. It was discovered by R. Jacobson, M. Brozović, B. Gladman, and M. Alexandersen in 2010. It received its permanent number in March 2015. It is now known to circle Jupiter at an average distance of 23.45 million km, taking 2.02 years to complete an orbit around Jupiter. Jupiter LI is about 3 km wide. It is a member of the Carme group.

Sequence of images of Jupiter LI, taken by the CFHT 38 minutes apart

This body was discovered from the 200-inch (508 cm) aperture Hale telescope in California. (there is also a 60-inch aperture Hale telescope)
