= Jupiter LXIII =

Moon of Jupiter

- Precovery images of Jupiter LXIII from the Canada-France-Hawaii Telescope in February 2003

Discovery
- Discovered by: Scott Sheppard et al.
- Discovery date: 2017

Designations
- Designation: Jupiter LXIII
- Alternative names: S/2017 J 2

Orbital characteristics
- Observation arc: 8 years 2024-12-03 (last obs)
- Semi-major axis: 23303000 km
- Eccentricity: 0.236
- Orbital period (sidereal): −723.1 days
- Mean anomaly: 344.4°
- Inclination: 166.4°
- Longitude of ascending node: 74.7°
- Argument of perihelion: 231.9°
- Satellite of: Jupiter
- Group: Carme group

Physical characteristics
- Mean diameter: 2 km
- Apparent magnitude: 23.5
- Absolute magnitude (H): 16.75 (20 obs)

Jupiter LXIII, provisionally known as S/2017 J 2, is an outer natural satellite of Jupiter. It was discovered by Scott S. Sheppard and his team in 2017, but not announced until July 17, 2018 via a Minor Planet Electronic Circular from the Minor Planet Center. It is about 2 kilometers in diameter and orbits at a semi-major axis of about 23,303,000 km with an inclination of about 166.4°. It belongs to the Carme group.
