= Aitne (moon) =

One of the smallest of Jupiter's moons

- Discovery images of Aitne by the Canada-France-Hawaii Telescope in December 2001

Discovery
- Discovered by: Scott S. Sheppard et al.
- Discovery site: Mauna Kea Obs.
- Discovery date: 9 December 2001

Designations
- Designation: Jupiter XXXI
- Pronunciation: /ˈeɪtniː/
- Named after: Αίτνη Aitnē
- Alternative names: S/2001 J 11
- Adjectives: Aitnean /ɛtˈniːən/

Orbital characteristics
- Observation arc: 24 years 2025-12-23 (last obs)
- Semi-major axis: 23231000 km
- Eccentricity: 0.264
- Orbital period (sidereal): −712.04 days
- Mean anomaly: 153.9°
- Inclination: 165.1°
- Longitude of ascending node: 24.5°
- Argument of perihelion: 122.2°
- Satellite of: Jupiter
- Group: Carme group

Physical characteristics
- Mean diameter: 3 km
- Apparent magnitude: 22.7
- Absolute magnitude (H): 16.0

Aitne /ˈeɪtniː/, also known as Jupiter XXXI, is a retrograde irregular satellite of Jupiter. It was discovered by a team of astronomers from the University of Hawaiʻi led by Scott S. Sheppard in 2001, and given the temporary designation S/2001 J 11. Aitne belongs to the Carme group, made up of irregular retrograde moons orbiting Jupiter at a distance ranging between 23 and 24 million km and at an inclination of about 165°.

Aitne is about 3 kilometres in diameter, and orbits Jupiter at an average distance of 22,285,000 km in 712.04 days, at an inclination of 166° to the ecliptic (164° to Jupiter's equator), in a retrograde direction and with an eccentricity of 0.393.

It was named in August 2003 after Aitna or Aitne, the divine personification of Mount Etna, whose sons by Zeus (Jupiter) are the Palici, the twin Sicilian gods of geysers (other authors have them descend from Thalia and/or Hephaistos).
