= Jupiter LXXII =

Natural satellite of Jupiter

Discovery
- Discovered by: Scott S. Sheppard
- Discovery date: 27 September 2011

Designations
- Designation: Jupiter LXXII
- Alternative names: S/2011 J 1

Orbital characteristics
- Observation arc: 13 years 2024-12-02 (last obs)
- Semi-major axis: 22462000 km
- Eccentricity: 0.233
- Orbital period (sidereal): −686.6 days
- Mean anomaly: 249.8°
- Inclination: 163.3°
- Longitude of ascending node: 323.9°
- Argument of perihelion: 127.2°
- Satellite of: Jupiter
- Group: Carme group

Physical characteristics
- Mean diameter: 2 km
- Apparent magnitude: 23.7
- Absolute magnitude (H): 16.82 (33 obs)

Jupiter LXXII, originally known as S/2011 J 1, is a natural satellite of Jupiter. It was discovered by Scott Sheppard in 2011. It belongs to the Carme group.

This moon was lost after its discovery in 2011. Its recovery was announced on 17 September 2018.
