= Jupiter LXVI =

Moon of Jupiter

- Discovery images of Jupiter LXVI from the Cerro Tololo Observatory's Dark Energy Camera on 23 March 2017

Discovery
- Discovered by: Scott S. Sheppard et al.
- Discovery date: 2017

Designations
- Designation: Jupiter LXVI
- Alternative names: S/2017 J 5

Orbital characteristics
- Observation arc: 7 years 2024-12-03 (last obs)
- Semi-major axis: 23232000 km
- Eccentricity: 0.284
- Orbital period (sidereal): −719.5 days
- Mean anomaly: 77.5°
- Inclination: 164.3°
- Longitude of ascending node: 118.2°
- Argument of periastron: 11.9°
- Satellite of: Jupiter
- Group: Carme group

Physical characteristics
- Mean diameter: 2 km
- Apparent magnitude: 23.5
- Absolute magnitude (H): 16.56 (18 obs)

Jupiter LXVI, originally known as S/2017 J 5, is an outer natural satellite of Jupiter. It was discovered by Scott S. Sheppard and his team in 2017, but not announced until July 17, 2018 via a Minor Planet Electronic Circular from the Minor Planet Center. It is about 2 kilometers in diameter and orbits at a semi-major axis of about 23,232,000 km with an inclination of about 164.3°. It belongs to the Carme group.
