= Jupiter LXI =

Moon of Jupiter

Discovery
- Discovered by: Brett J. Gladman
- Discovery date: April 2003

Designations
- Designation: Jupiter LXI
- Alternative names: S/2003 J 19

Orbital characteristics
- Observation arc: 21 years 2024-12-03 (last obs)
- Semi-major axis: 22757000 km
- Eccentricity: 0.257
- Orbital period (sidereal): −697.6 days
- Mean anomaly: 205.7°
- Inclination: 166.7°
- Longitude of ascending node: 105.7°
- Argument of perihelion: 284.1°
- Satellite of: Jupiter
- Group: Carme group

Physical characteristics
- Mean diameter: 2 km
- Apparent magnitude: 23.7
- Absolute magnitude (H): 16.60 (32 obs)

Jupiter LXI, provisionally known as S/2003 J 19, is a natural satellite of Jupiter. It was discovered by a team of astronomers led by Brett J. Gladman et al. in 2003.

S/2003 J 19 is about 2 kilometers in diameter, and orbits Jupiter at an average distance of 22,709 Mm in 699.125 days, at an inclination of 165° to the ecliptic (164° to Jupiter's equator), in a retrograde direction and with an eccentricity of 0.1961.

It belongs to the Carme group, made up of irregular retrograde moons orbiting Jupiter at a distance ranging between 23 and 24 million km and at an inclination of about 165°.

This moon was lost following its discovery in 2003. It was recovered in 2018 and given its permanent designation that year.
