= Callichore =

Greek nymph

In Greek mythology, Callichore or Kallichore (Ancient Greek: Καλλιχόρη, lit. 'beautiful in dance') is sometimes considered one of the Muses, and thus a daughter of Zeus (Jupiter); a scholion to Hesiod's Works and Days by John Tzetzes names her. She is better known, however, as one of the Nysiads, nymphs who nursed Dionysus. Both the lunar crater Kallichore and Jupiter's moon Kallichore are named after her.
