= Carme group =

Group of satellites orbiting Jupiter

This diagram compares the orbital elements and relative sizes of the known members of the Carme group as of April 2026. The horizontal axis illustrates their average distance from Jupiter, the vertical axis their orbital inclination, and the circles their relative sizes.

107 irregular moons of Jupiter plotted by semi-major axis and inclination as of April 2026. The Carme group is shown as a tight cluster of red-colored points on the left.

The Carme group (or family or cluster; also referred to as the 165° inclination cluster) is a group of retrograde irregular satellites of Jupiter that follow similar orbits to Carme and are thought to have a common origin. They are inferred to be collisional fragments leftover from a single break-up shortly after the planet formation period.

Their semi-major axes (distances from Jupiter) range between 22.7 and 23.6 million km, their orbital inclinations between 164.3° and 164.9°, and their orbital eccentricities between 0.24 and 0.28.

The International Astronomical Union (IAU) reserves names ending in -e for all retrograde moons of Jupiter, which includes all those in the Carme group.

== Origin ==
The very low dispersion of the mean orbital elements (Note: Osculating orbital parameters of irregular satellites of Jupiter change widely in short intervals due to heavy perturbation by the Sun. For example, changes of as much as 1 million km in semi-major axis in 2 years, 0.5 in eccentricity in 12 years, and as much as 5° in 24 years have been reported. Mean orbital elements are the averages calculated by the numerical integration of current elements over a long period of time, used to determine the dynamical families.) among the core members (the group is separated by less than 900,000 km in semi major axis and only 0.6° in inclination) suggests that the Carme group may once have been a single body that was broken apart by an impact. The dispersion can be explained by a very small velocity impulse (5 < δV < 50 m/s). The parent body was probably about the size of Carme, 46 km in diameter; 99% of the group's mass is still located in Carme.

Further support to the single body origin comes from the known colours: all the satellites appear light red, with colour indices B-V = 0.76 and V-R = 0.47 and infrared spectra, similar to D-type asteroids. These data are consistent with a progenitor from the Hilda family or a Jupiter trojan. However, one moon, Kalyke, is substantially redder, consistent with the colour of a centaur or a Trans-Neptunian object instead. As such it was suggested it may have its origin somewhere else, an interloper from the outer Solar System. Alternatively, Kalyke might be a remnant of the object that collided with the Carme group progenitor, as opposed to being a fragment of the progenitor itself. However, it would be unusual for such a remnant to settle into a post-collision orbit very similar to the progenitor it impacted.

The formation of the Carme group was likely via a collision with a passing planetesimal, as opposed to a moon-moon impact. Due to their longer orbital periods and greater distances from Jupiter, collisions are rare among the retrograde satellites. Numerical integrations show the expected number of collisions in the past 4.5 billion years among all retrograde moons combined is around 1, which is probably not common enough to have produced the families. The impactor of the parent object produced a large crater, but was not large enough to catastrophically disrupt the progenitor, as the largest fragment still has 99% of the mass of the parent body. The impactor's diameter is required to be 0.59 km; planetesimals of that size were very common early in the Solar System's formation. However, a moon-moon collisional origin is still plausible if the number of retrograde irregular moons around Jupiter was much more numerous in the past. The Ananke group is inferred to have a similar formation.

== List ==
The Carme group members are (in order by date announcement):

Name	Diameter (km)	Semi-Major Axis (km)	Period (days) (Note: Negative period is indicative of retrograde motion.)	Notes
Carme	46.7	23139200	–719.28	largest member and group prototype
Kalyke	6.9	23298000	–726.70	substantially redder than the others
Erinome	3	23027200	–714.05	
Isonoe	4	22976300	–711.66	
Taygete	5	23103400	–717.59	
Chaldene	4	22926300	–709.36	
Pasithee	2	22840800	–705.41	
Kale	2	23047800	–715.02	
Aitne	3	23059400	–715.54	
Arche	3	23093200	–717.11	
Eukelade	4	23062400	–715.69	
Eirene	4	23051300	–715.19	
S/2003 J 9	1	23195100	–721.88	
S/2003 J 10	2	23384400	–730.74	
Kallichore	3.8	23017100	–713.59	Possible flyby target of Juice mission
Herse	2	23146700	–719.63	
Jupiter LXI	2	23153100	–719.92	
S/2003 J 24	2	22882400	–707.33	
Jupiter LI	2	23185600	–721.43	
Jupiter LXXII	2	23120800	–718.42	
Jupiter LXIII	2	22949600	–710.42	
Jupiter LXVI	2	23202000	–722.20	
Jupiter LXIX	1	22819600	–704.42	
S/2016 J 3	2	22719300	–699.76	
S/2018 J 3	1	23400200	–731.49	
S/2021 J 4	1	23019700	–713.71	
S/2021 J 5	2	23414600	–732.15	
S/2021 J 6	1	22870400	–706.77	
S/2022 J 1	2	22744700	–700.93	
S/2022 J 2	1	23073400	–716.21	
S/2017 J 11	2	22991300	–712.38	
S/2018 J 5	2	23269900	–725.38	
S/2024 J 1	2	23462100	–734.38	
S/2011 J 5	2	23527800	–737.46	
S/2011 J 6	1	23238700	–723.93	
S/2017 J 12	1	23270500	–725.40	
S/2017 J 13	1	22842700	–705.50	
S/2010 J 4	1	22793400	–703.19	
S/2017 J 16	1	23007800	–713.13	
S/2017 J 18	2	22923800	–709.24	
S/2010 J 5	1	23581000	–739.99	
