= Eirene (moon) =

Moon of Jupiter

Discovery
- Discovered by: Scott Sheppard et al.
- Discovery date: 2003

Designations
- Designation: Jupiter LVII
- Pronunciation: /aɪˈriːniː/
- Named after: Εἰρήνη Eirēnē
- Alternative names: S/2003 J 5
- Adjectives: Eirenean /aɪrɪˈniːən/

Orbital characteristics
- Observation arc: 21 years 2024-12-03 (last obs)
- Semi-major axis: 23731770 km
- Eccentricity: 0.2413
- Orbital period (sidereal): −743.88 days (2.038 years)
- Inclination: 162.713° (to the ecliptic)
- Satellite of: Jupiter
- Group: Carme group

Physical characteristics
- Mean diameter: 4 km
- Apparent magnitude: 22.5
- Absolute magnitude (H): 15.79 (46 obs)

Eirene /aɪˈriːniː/, also Jupiter LVII and originally known as S/2003 J 5, is a retrograde irregular satellite of Jupiter. It was discovered by a team of astronomers from the University of Hawaiʻi led by Scott S. Sheppard in 2003 but was then lost. It was recovered in 2017 and given its permanent designation that year.

== Characteristics ==
Eirene is about 4 kilometres in diameter, and orbits Jupiter at an average distance of 23,974,000 km in 743.88 days, at an inclination of 166° to the ecliptic (167° to Jupiter's equator), in a retrograde direction and with an eccentricity of 0.307.

It belongs to the Carme group, made up of irregular retrograde moons orbiting Jupiter at a distance ranging between 23 and 24 million km and at an inclination of about 165°.

== Name ==
The moon was named in 2019 after Eirene (Εἰρήνη), the daughter of Zeus and Themis and the goddess of peace in Greek mythology; the name originated from a naming contest held on Twitter with sixteen tweets suggesting the name, most significantly by users Quadrupoltensor (@Quadrupoltensor) who first suggested the name and PaulR (@PJRYYC).
