= Jupiter LXIX =

Outer moon of Jupiter

- Discovery images of Jupiter LXIX from the Cerro Tololo Observatory's Dark Energy Camera on 23 March 2017

Discovery
- Discovered by: Scott Sheppard et al.
- Discovery date: 2017

Designations
- Designation: Jupiter LXIX
- Alternative names: S/2017 J 8

Orbital characteristics
- Observation arc: 14 years 2024-12-03 (last obs)
- Semi-major axis: 23232700 km
- Eccentricity: 0.312
- Orbital period (sidereal): −719.6 days
- Mean anomaly: 70.8°
- Inclination: 164.7°
- Longitude of ascending node: 160.3°
- Argument of perihelion: 45.1°
- Satellite of: Jupiter
- Group: Carme group

Physical characteristics
- Mean diameter: 1 km
- Apparent magnitude: 24.0
- Absolute magnitude (H): 17.08 (27 obs)

Jupiter LXIX, originally known as S/2017 J 8, is an outer natural satellite of Jupiter. It was discovered by Scott S. Sheppard and his team in 2017, but not announced until July 17, 2018, via a Minor Planet Electronic Circular from the Minor Planet Center. It is about 1 kilometer in diameter and orbits at a semi-major axis of about 23,232,700 km with an inclination of about 164.7°. It belongs to the Carme group.

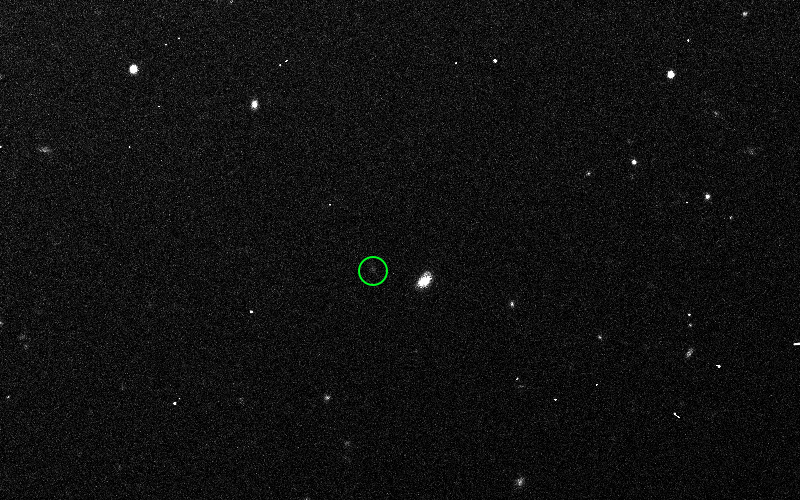
Precovery image of Jupiter LXIX on 8 September 2010 (circled)
