= Eukelade =

Moon of Jupiter

- Images of Eukelade taken by Scott Sheppard on 4 March 2003

Discovery
- Discovered by: Scott S. Sheppard et al.
- Discovery date: 2003

Designations
- Designation: Jupiter XLVII
- Pronunciation: /juːˈkɛlədiː/
- Named after: Ευκελάδη Eykeladē
- Alternative names: S/2003 J 1
- Adjectives: Eukeladean /ˌjuːkɪləˈdiːən/

Orbital characteristics
- Epoch 2026-01-01
- Observation arc: 19 years 2022-09-02 (last obs)
- Periapsis: 14.3 million km
- Apoapsis: 30.7 million km (2026-Jan-17)
- Semi-major axis: 22.5 million km
- Eccentricity: 0.363
- Orbital period (sidereal): −689.2 days
- Mean anomaly: 170°
- Inclination: 165.2°
- Longitude of ascending node: 206.3°
- Argument of perihelion: 80.3°
- Satellite of: Jupiter
- Group: Carme group

Physical characteristics
- Mean diameter: 4 km
- Spectral type: B–V = 0.79 ± 0.07, V–R = 0.50 ± 0.07
- Apparent magnitude: 22.6
- Absolute magnitude (H): 15.9

Eukelade /juːˈkɛlədiː/, also known as Jupiter XLVII, is a retrograde irregular satellite of Jupiter. It was discovered by a team of astronomers from the University of Hawaiʻi led by Scott S. Sheppard in 2003, and received the temporary designation S/2003 J 1.

Eukelade is about 4 kilometres in diameter, and orbits Jupiter at an average distance of 22.5 million km in 689 days, at an inclination of 165° to the ecliptic, in a retrograde direction and with an eccentricity of 0.363. Eukelade came to apojove (farthest distance from Jupiter) on 17 January 2026 when it was 0.205 AU (30.7 million km; 19.1 million mi) from Jupiter.

It was named in March 2005 after Eucelade - according to John Tzetzes, listed by some (unnamed) Greek writers as one of the Muses. The name ends in an "e" because the orbit is retrograde.

Eukelade belongs to the Carme group, made up of irregular retrograde moons orbiting Jupiter at a distance ranging between 23 and 24 million km and at an inclination of about 165°.
