= Kalyke =

Moon of Jupiter

- Kalyke imaged by the Canada-France-Hawaii Telescope in December 2001

Discovery
- Discovered by: Scott S. Sheppard; David C. Jewitt; Yanga R. Fernandez; Eugene A. Magnier
- Discovery site: Mauna Kea Observatory
- Discovery date: 23 November 2000

Designations
- Designation: Jupiter XXIII
- Pronunciation: /ˈkæləkiː/
- Named after: Καλύκη Kalykē
- Alternative names: S/2000 J 2
- Adjectives: Kalykean /kæləˈkiːən/

Orbital characteristics
- Epoch 27 April 2019 (JD 2458600.5)
- Observation arc: 24 years 2024-12-03 (last obs)
- Semi-major axis: 0.1614179 AU (24,147,770 km)
- Eccentricity: 0.3028225
- Orbital period (sidereal): −766.61 d
- Mean anomaly: 63.16063°
- Mean motion: 0° 28^{m} 10.57^{s} / day
- Inclination: 165.93730° (to ecliptic)
- Longitude of ascending node: 132.43876°
- Argument of perihelion: 323.78885°
- Satellite of: Jupiter
- Group: Carme group

Physical characteristics
- Mean diameter: 6.9±1.3 km
- Albedo: 0.029±0.014
- Spectral type: D? (Note: Grav et al., 2015 stated that Grav et al., 2003 used optical photometry to class Kalyke as a D-type. However, Grav et al., 2003 stated that it had colours too red to be a P or D-type object.)
- Apparent magnitude: 21.8
- Absolute magnitude (H): 15.4

Kalyke /ˈkæləkiː/, also known as Jupiter XXIII, is a medium-sized retrograde irregular satellite of Jupiter. It is the second-largest member of the Carme group.

== Discovery and naming ==
It was discovered by a team of astronomers from the University of Hawaiʻi led by Scott S. Sheppard in 2000, and given the temporary designation S/2000 J 2.

It was named in October 2002 after the Greek mythological figure Kalyke or Calyce.

== Orbit ==
It orbits Jupiter at an average distance of 23,298,000 km in 726.70 days, at an inclination of 165° to the ecliptic, in a retrograde direction and with an eccentricity of 0.2140. The orbital elements are continuously changing due to solar and planetary perturbations.

It belongs to the Carme group, made up of tightly confined irregular retrograde moons orbiting Jupiter at a distance ranging between 22.7 and 23.5 million km, at an inclination of about 165°, and eccentricities between 0.24 and 0.28.

== Physical characteristics ==
Kalyke observed by the WISE spacecraft in 2010

Kalyke appears red in the visible spectrum, similar to D-type asteroids. Its spectrum has been remarked to be like that of asteroid 5145 Pholus, another very reddish object. (Note: Vilas et al., 2006 stated that Grav et al., 2003 considered Kalyke's spectrum to be similar to that of 5145 Pholus. However, Grav et al., 2003 make no explicit mention of 5145 Pholus.) From infrared thermal measurements by the WISE spacecraft, Kalyke's albedo was measured at 2.9%, corresponding to a diameter of 6.9 kilometres, making it one of the least reflective bodies in the Solar System.

A group of scientists observed Kalyke on 14 January 2002 with the Nordic Optical Telescope on the island of La Palma in the Canary Islands of Spain, obtaining colours of V−R=0.72, V−I=0.96. It was observed again on 13 March 2002 with the MMT Observatory on Mount Hopkins in Arizona, United States, with colours of B−V=0.94, V−R=0.70, V−I=0.88.

From this they determined Kalyke was a very red object, consistent with the colours of a centaur or TNO (unlike other Carme group objects), but this classification was uncertain. The V−R value is indicative of a red object, while the V−I value is of a more moderate, light red and compatible with P and D-type asteroids. They suggested the moderate V−I value may not be real and an artifact of fringing of the CCDs used to take the images, and that more observations were needed to confirm Kalyke's red colour.

However, a later paper disagreed and argued that the V−I value was real, because of its repeatability between observations. The spectral placement could indicate the V−I value was caused by an absorption feature of mafic silicate. If this absorption feature were to be found around the 1 μm mark in its spectrum, it would be just as likely for Kalyke to have originated in the main asteroid belt.

== Origin ==
Kalyke probably did not form near Jupiter but was captured by Jupiter later. Like the other members of the Carme group, which have similar orbits, Kalyke is probably the remnant of a broken, captured heliocentric asteroid. The Carme group is thought to have been created when a D-type asteroid split into many fragments when it later suffered an impact.

However, Kalyke is significantly redder in color than other moons of the Carme group. This suggests that it may be an interloper from the outer Solar System, as opposed to an origin with the Hilda group or Jupiter trojans that has been speculated for the rest of the Carme group. It was proposed that Kalyke was a remnant of the object that collided with the Carme group progenitor, as opposed to being a fragment of the progenitor itself. However, it would be unusual for such a remnant to settle into a post-collision orbit very similar to the progenitor it impacted.
