= Yanga R. Fernández =

American astronomer (born 1971)

- Born: June 10, 1971 (age 54); Mississauga, Ontario, Canada
- Occupation: Astronomer

Yanga (Yan) Roland Fernández (born June 10, 1971) is a Canadian-born American astronomer at the University of Central Florida.

Together with Scott S. Sheppard, he co-discovered the Carme group, a group of moons of the planet Jupiter.

== Life ==
Born in Mississauga, Ontario, Yanga grew up in New York City, Minneapolis, Washington, D.C., and went to high school in Fort Myers, Florida. After undergraduate studies at California Institute of Technology, Yan received his Ph.D. at the University of Maryland, College Park in 1999. As a student in 1994, he helped maintain one of the first e-mail lists used by astronomers to communicate news about a fast-breaking event, the impact of Comet Shoemaker-Levy 9 into Jupiter. From 1999 to 2005, he was a postdoctoral fellow at the Institute for Astronomy at the University of Hawaiʻi, then accepted a position as assistant professor at the University of Central Florida. His research focuses on the physical properties and evolution of asteroids and comets.

Asteroid 12225 Yanfernández was named in his honor.
