= Canada–France–Hawaii Telescope =

Astronomical observatory

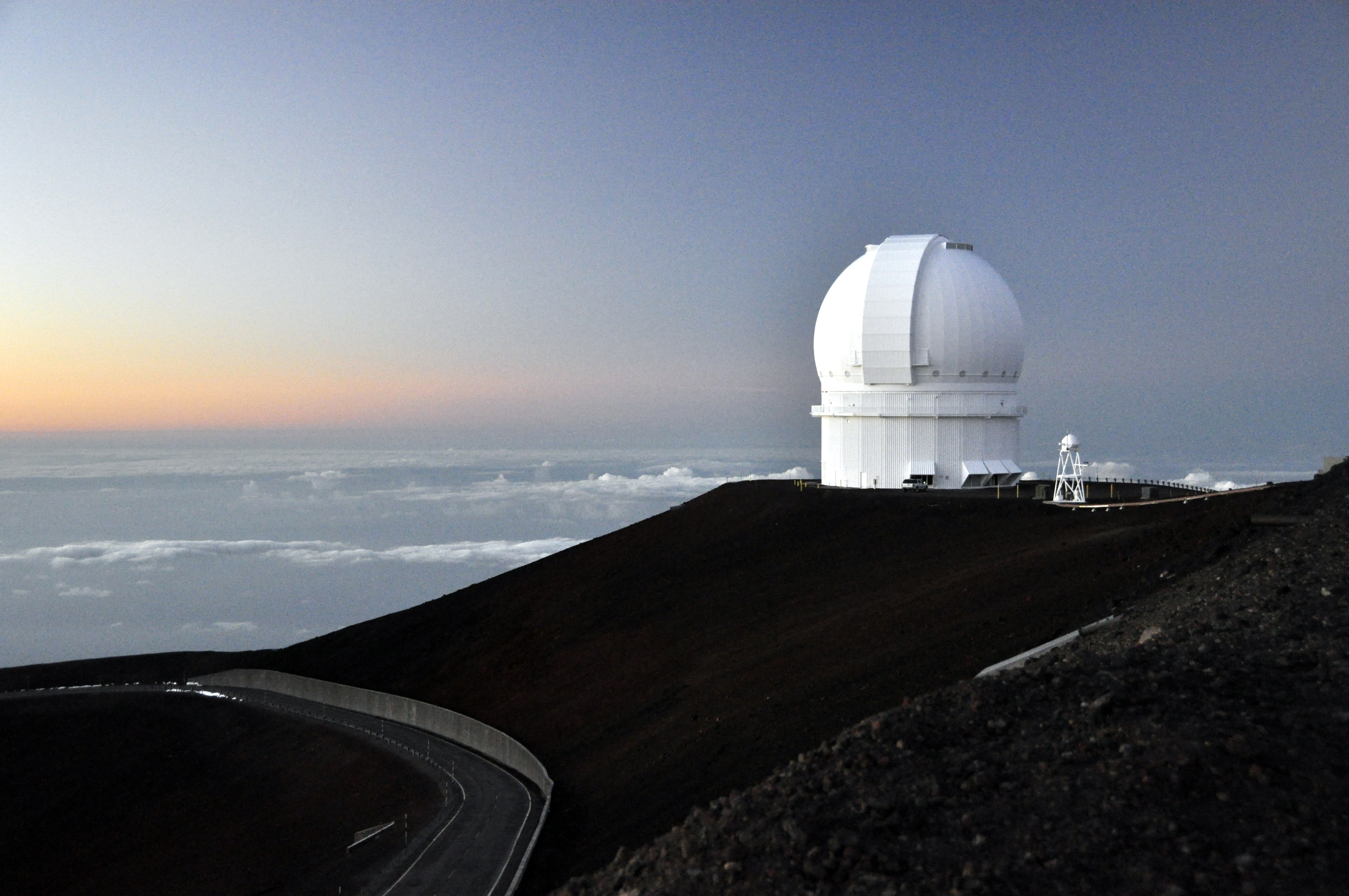
- Alternative names: CFHT，Canada–France–Hawaii Telescope
- Location(s): Hawaiʻi County, Hawaii
- Coordinates: 19°49′31″N 155°28′08″W
- Organization: French National Centre for Scientific Research; National Research Council Canada; University of Hawaiʻi at Mānoa
- Observatory code: T14
- Altitude: 4,204 m (13,793 ft)
- Diameter: 3.58 m (11 ft 9 in)
- Website: www.cfht.hawaii.edu/en/about/
- Location within Hawaii
- Related media on Commons

The Canada–France–Hawaii Telescope (CFHT French: Télescope Canada–France–Hawaï) is a 3.58 metres (11.7 ft) optical/infrared telescope located near the summit of Mauna Kea on the Big Island of Hawaiʻi at an altitude of 4,204 m (13,793 ft), within the Maunakea Observatories. The telescope has a Prime Focus/Cassegrain configuration, and has been in operation since 1979.

CFHT had proposed redeveloping its summit facility into the Maunakea Spectroscopic Explorer, replacing the existing telescope with an 11.25 m (36.9 ft) segmented telescope while reusing much of the existing observatory infrastructure, including the foundation, telescope pier, and portions of the support building. As of 2026, however, the project remains on hold pending review of governance and leasing of observatories at this site. In the interim, the existing telescope will remain operating into the 2030s.

== Funding ==
The corporation is bound by a tripartite agreement between the University of Hawaii at Manoa, in the United States, the National Research Council (NRC) in Canada and the Centre National de la Recherche Scientifique (CNRS) in France. CFHT also has partnerships with the National Astronomical Observatory of China (NAOC), the Academia Sinica Institute of Astronomy and Astrophysics (ASIAA) in Taiwan, the National Laboratory of Astrophysics (LNA) in Brazil and the Korea Astronomy and Space Science Institute (KASI) in Korea. The contributions from these associate partners help fund CFHT's future instrumentation. Currently, CFHT observing time is offered to scientists from all the seven countries in the partnership. Astronomers from the European Union can also submit proposals through the Optical Infrared Coordination Network for Astronomy (OPTICON) access program.

== Instruments ==
CFHT currently operates five instruments:

- MegaPrime/MegaCam, a one-square-degree field high-resolution CCD mosaic of 40 CCDs totalling 378 megapixels
- WIRCam (Wide-Field Infrared Camera), an infrared mosaic of 4 detectors totalling 16 megapixels, optimized for the J, H, and K spectral bands
- ESPaDOnS (Echelle SpectroPolarimetric Device for the Observation of Stars at CFHT), an echelle spectrograph/spectropolarimeter
- SITELLE (Spectromètre Imageur à Transformée de Fourier pour l'Etude en Long et en Large de raies d'Emission), a wide-field Fourier transform spectrograph
- SPIRou (Spectropolarimètre Infrarouge), a near-infrared spectropolarimeter

== Notable discoveries ==
In March 2025, astronomers using the CFHT announced the discovery of 128 new moons of Saturn, bringing the gas giant's total number of confirmed satellites to 274.

== Outreach ==
CFHT, in collaboration with Coelum Astronomia, maintains a public-outreach website called "Hawaiian Starlight" which offers extremely high-quality versions of CFHT images in various formats including a yearly calendar.

== Gallery ==
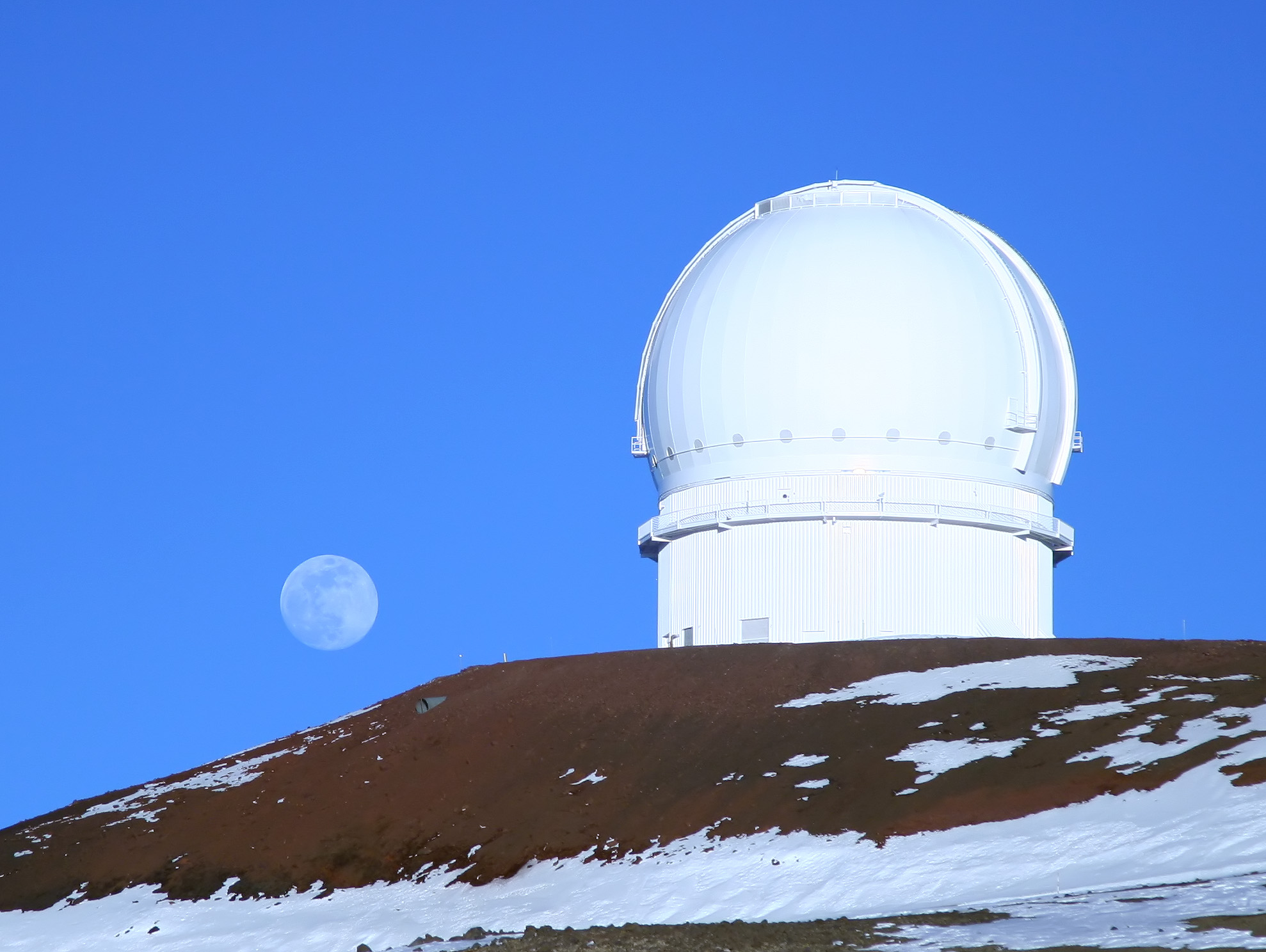
CFHT with moon in the background

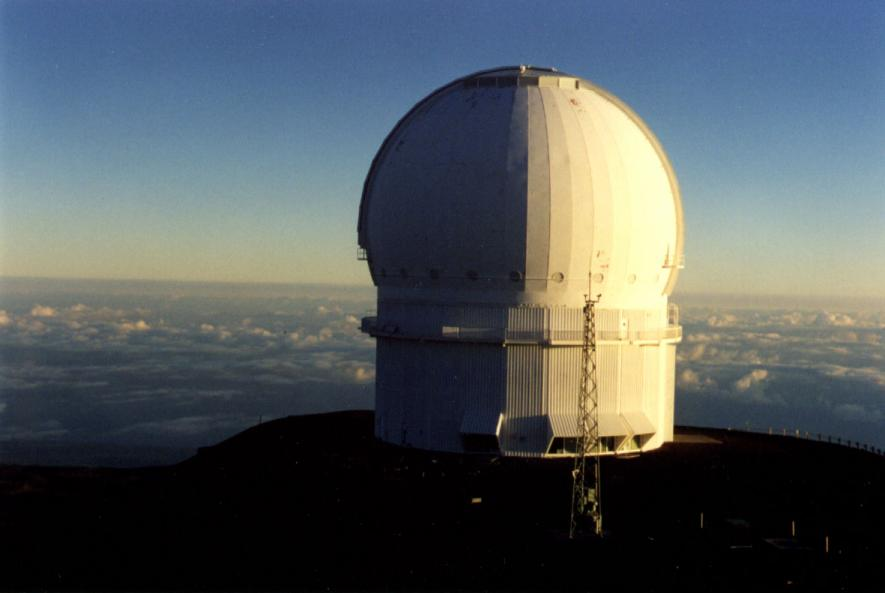
CFHT in the morning

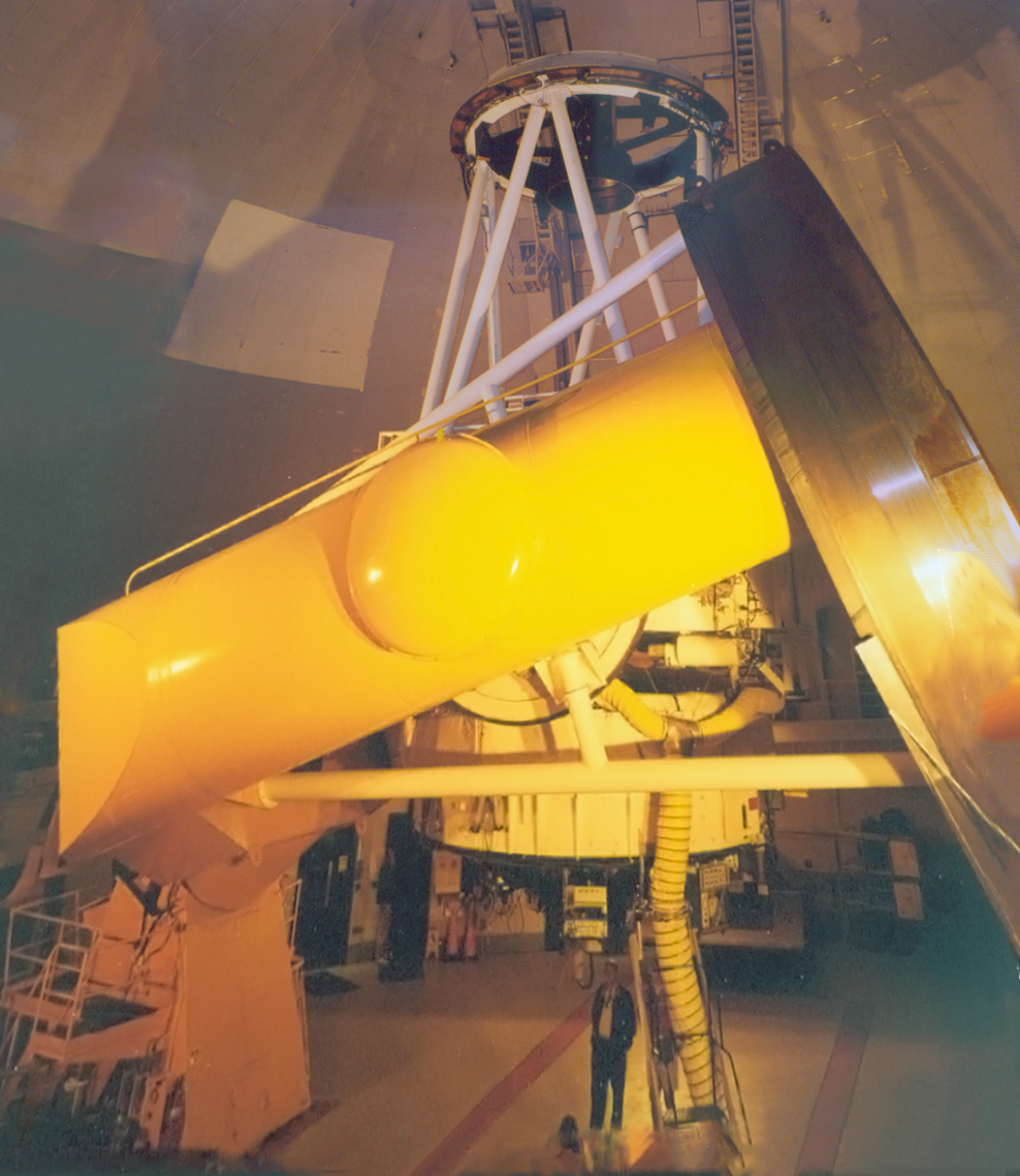
The telescope in August 2002

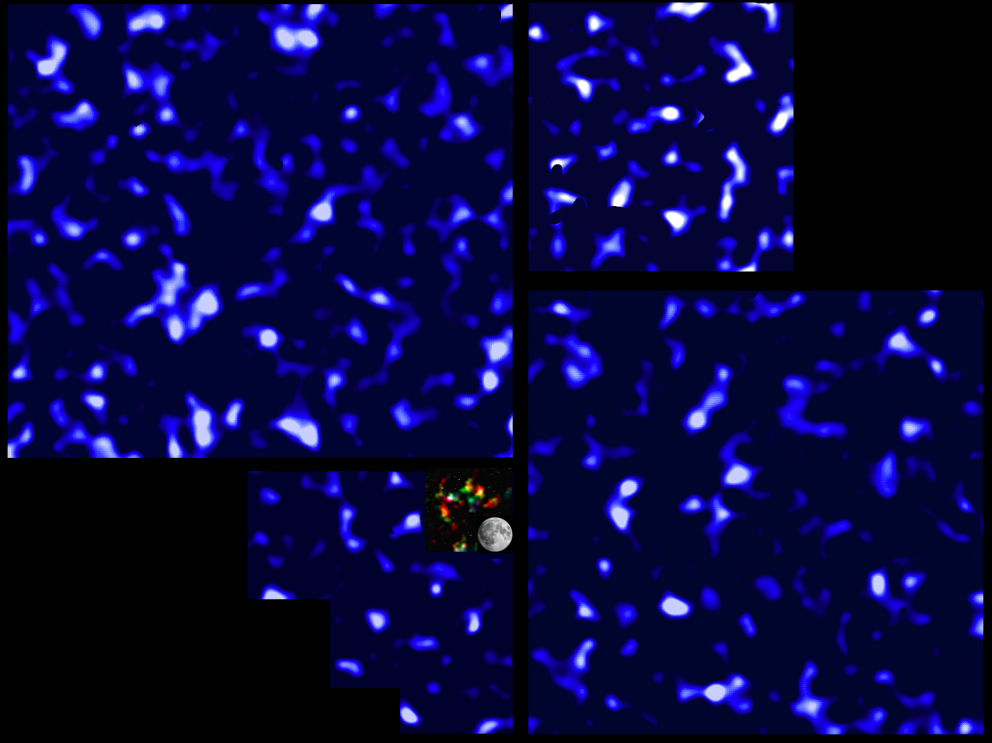
Dark matter map from 2012 by CFHT Lensing Survey (CFHTLenS). The central colour inset shows the previous largest COSMOS dark matter map

== See also ==
- List of largest optical reflecting telescopes
