= Name conflicts in astronomy =

There are several real or apparent name conflicts between different Solar System bodies, despite efforts to give every named body a distinct name. Most of these conflicts are between asteroids and natural satellites of planets, which are named according to different but partially overlapping schemes. Most satellites are named after people and divinities in Greek and Roman mythology; this is rarely true of asteroids currently, with the exception of centaurs and Jupiter trojans, but formerly many asteroids had mythological names, which consequently came into conflict with the names of natural satellites. Some Solar System bodies also share names with stars, exoplanets or constellations.

There are attempts to mitigate this among bodies in the Solar System. Asteroid 10386 Romulus was named in April 2002, and the moon (87) Sylvia I Romulus in August 2005. However, when the name "Nyx" was proposed for Pluto II in 2006, it was rejected because it conflicted with asteroid 3908 Nyx, and thus was resubmitted with the spelling "Nix".

== Bodies with identical names and referents ==
Some of these bodies have exactly the same name, referring to the same mythological character. The earliest such conflicts possibly arose through not considering certain mythological names as "official"; for instance, the names Io, Europa, Ganymede and Callisto for the Galilean satellites of Jupiter were not used in astronomical literature of a certain era, their place being taken by Jupiter I, Jupiter II, Jupiter III, Jupiter IV (cf. Naming of moons).

=== Moon named first ===
In the earliest of these conflicts, the natural satellite was named first, and the conflict arose with the naming of an asteroid. These conflicts span the period 1858–1906.

- Europa, a moon of Jupiter, named 1614 and 52 Europa, discovered 1858
- Io, a moon of Jupiter, named 1614 and 85 Io, discovered 1865
- Dione, a moon of Saturn, named 1847 and 106 Dione, discovered 1868
- Rhea, a moon of Saturn, named 1847 and 577 Rhea, discovered 1905
- Titania, a moon of Uranus, named 1852 and 593 Titania, discovered 1906

=== Asteroid named first ===
Later conflicts arose in relatively recent times from giving newly discovered satellites the same names as those of asteroids. By this time, it was possibly felt that the true name of an asteroid such as "38 Leda" included its minor planet number, and so re-using the name for a satellite did not really create a conflict. These conflicts span the period 1975–2001, though some conflicts of this type had arisen earlier with some names used unofficially.

- 9 Metis, discovered 1848 and Metis, a moon of Jupiter, named 1983.
- 38 Leda, discovered 1856 and Leda, a moon of Jupiter, named 1975.
- 55 Pandora, discovered 1858 and Pandora, a moon of Saturn, named 1985.
- 74 Galatea, discovered 1862 and Galatea, a moon of Neptune, discovered 1989.
- 113 Amalthea, discovered 1871 and Amalthea, a moon of Jupiter, discovered 1892; the name was suggested by Camille Flammarion shortly after its discovery, but it was not officially named until 1975.
- 171 Ophelia, discovered 1877 and Ophelia, a moon of Uranus, discovered 1986.
- 239 Adrastea, discovered 1884 and Adrastea, a moon of Jupiter, named in 1983. Adrastea was also an unofficial name for Jupiter's moon Ananke (1955–1975).
- 666 Desdemona, discovered 1908 and Desdemona, a moon of Uranus, discovered 1986.
- 1810 Epimetheus, discovered 1960 and Epimetheus a moon of Saturn, named 1983.
- 1809 Prometheus, discovered 1960 and Prometheus, a moon of Saturn, named 1985.
- 2758 Cordelia, discovered 1978 and Cordelia, a moon of Uranus, discovered 1986.
- 4450 Pan, discovered 1987 and Pan, a moon of Saturn, discovered 1990. Pan was also an unofficial name for Jupiter's moon Carme (1955–1975).
- 10386 Romulus, discovered 1996 and Romulus, a moon of Sylvia, discovered 2001 and named 2005.

=== Conflicts with extrasolar bodies ===
- Asterope (21 Tauri) and 233 Asterope, discovered 1883.
- Merope (23 Tauri) and 1051 Merope, discovered 1925.
- Mimosa (β Crucis) and 1079 Mimosa, discovered 1927.
- Atlas (27 Tauri) and Atlas, a moon of Saturn, named 1983.
- Anser (α Vulpeculae) and 8435 Anser, named 1999.
- 238 Hypatia, discovered 1884 and Hypatia (ι Draconis b), an exoplanet, named 2015.
- 571 Dulcinea, discovered 1905 and Dulcinea (μ Arae c), an exoplanet, named 2015.
- 31338 Lipperhey, named 2008 and Lipperhey (55 Cancri d), an exoplanet, named 2015.
- 79144 Cervantes, named 2005 and Cervantes (μ Arae), a star, named 2015.
- Hiisi, binary companion of 47171 Lempo, named 2017 and Hiisi (HAT-P-38b), an exoplanet, named 2019.

=== Conflicts with disproven bodies ===
- 24 Themis, discovered 1853 and Themis, named 1905. The latter Themis was a supposed moon of Saturn that turned out not to exist.

=== Comets ===
By convention comets are named after their discoverers, so multiple comets often have the same name; they are differentiated by numerical designations. Comets can also share names with asteroids, for example Halley's Comet and 2688 Halley, both named after Edmond Halley.

== Bodies with identical names and different referents ==
Some bodies have names of identical form, but were actually named for different persons or things.

- 218 Bianca, discovered 1880, was named after opera singer Bianca Bianchi and Bianca, a moon of Uranus, discovered 1986, was named after a Shakespeare character.
- 1162 Larissa, discovered 1930, was named for the Thessalian town Larissa and Larissa, a moon of Neptune, discovered 1981, was named after the nymph Larissa.

=== Conflicts with extrasolar bodies ===
- Mira (ο Ceti) is a Latin name meaning "amazing" or "wonderful". 3633 Mira was named in 1994 after Hugo Mira, researcher at Félix Aguilar Observatory.
- Imai (δ Crucis) is a traditional Mursi name, referring to the grass that grows along the banks of the Omo River. 8271 Imai was named in 2012 after Yasushi Imai, president of a planetarium manufacturing company.
- Peacock (α Pavonis) was named in the 1930s after the peacock, which its constellation Pavo represents. 18727 Peacock was named in 2007 after Anthony Peacock, project scientist for the Exosat and XMM-Newton missions.
- Neri (HD 32518 b), an exoplanet, was named in 2019 after the Neri River in Ethiopia. 126965 Neri was named in 2021 after Rodolfo Neri Vela, the first Mexican to travel to space.
- Maia (20 Tauri) is named after Maia, one of the seven daughters of Atlas and Pleione in Greek mythology. 127936 Maia was named in 2023 after Maia Palomba, the second daughter of Ernesto Palomba.
- 1863 Antinous, discovered 1948, is named after Antinous of Ithaca, a character in the Odyssey. The star Antinous (θ Aquilae) was named in 2024 after the obsolete constellation Antinous, which in turn was named after Antinous, lover of the Roman emperor Hadrian.

=== Conflicts with constellations ===
- Ara and 849 Ara, discovered 1912.
- Carina and 491 Carina, discovered 1902.
- Hydra and Hydra, a moon of Pluto, named 2006.
- Norma and 555 Norma, discovered 1905

== Bodies with similar names and the same referent ==
Some objects have names that refer to the same mythological character, but slight variations in spelling prevent there from being a technical conflict.

=== Moon named first ===
- Callisto, a moon of Jupiter, named 1614 and 204 Kallisto, discovered 1879, both variant transliterations of the name of the nymph Callisto.
- Ganymede, a moon of Jupiter, named 1614 and 1036 Ganymed, discovered 1924, both named for Zeus' cupbearer. The name in Latin is Ganymedes, of which Ganymede is an English form and Ganymed a German one. The names are therefore in full conflict in German.

=== Asteroid named first ===
- 14 Irene, discovered 1851 and Eirene, a moon of Jupiter, named 2019, both named for the Greek personification of peace.
- 53 Kalypso, discovered 1858 and Calypso, a moon of Saturn, named 1983, both named for the Atlantid nymph Calypso.
- 548 Kressida, discovered 1904 and Cressida, a moon of Uranus, discovered 1986, both named after Cressida, a heroine in English-language versions of the Troy legend (in the case of the moon of Uranus, by way of Shakespeare).
- 101 Helena, discovered 1868 and Helene, a moon of Saturn, named 1988, both named after Helen of Troy.
- 657 Gunlöd, discovered 1908 and Gunnlod, a moon of Saturn, named 2022, both named after Norse giantess Gunnlöð
- 899 Jokaste, discovered 1918 and Iocaste, a moon of Jupiter, named 2002, both named for Queen Jocasta of Thebes.
- 763 Cupido, discovered 1913 and Cupid, a moon of Uranus, discovered 2003, after the Roman god Cupid. Cupido is the Latin form, Cupid a modification of the same used in English. The name of the moon Cupid specifically refers to Cupid appearing as a character in the play Timon of Athens.
- 3908 Nyx, discovered 1980 and Nix, a moon of Pluto, named 2006, both named for Nyx, goddess of night.
- 1865 Cerberus, discovered 1971 and Kerberos, a moon of Pluto, named 2013, both named for Cerberus, canine guardian of the underworld.

=== Both moons ===
- Herse, a moon of Jupiter discovered 2003, and Ersa, a moon of Jupiter discovered 2018, both named after the goddess Ersa (the Greek goddess of dew).

=== Both asteroids ===
- 26 Proserpina, discovered 1853 and 399 Persephone, discovered 1895, both named for Persephone, goddess of the underworld.
- 68 Leto, discovered 1861 and 639 Latona, discovered 1907. Named for Leto, mother of Apollo and Artemis.
- 161 Athor, discovered 1876 and 2340 Hathor, discovered 1976, both named for the Egyptian goddess Hathor.
- 646 Kastalia, discovered 1907 and 4769 Castalia, discovered 1989, both named for the Greek nymph Castalia.
- 1068 Nofretete, discovered 1926 and 3199 Nefertiti, discovered 1982, both named for the Egyptian queen Nefertiti.
- 1143 Odysseus, discovered 1930, and 5254 Ulysses, discovered 1986, named for the Greek warrior Odysseus.
- 2155 Wodan, discovered 1960 and 3989 Odin, discovered 1986, variant names of the Germanic god Odin.
- 3477 Kazbegi, discovered 1979 and 65541 Kasbek, discovered 1960, variant names of Mount Kazbek.

=== Conflicts with extrasolar bodies ===
- 66 Maja, discovered 1861, and Maia (20 Tauri), a star.
- 697 Galilea, discovered 1910, and Galileo (55 Cancri Ab), an exoplanet, named 2015.
- 1322 Coppernicus, discovered 1934, and Copernicus (55 Cancri A), a star, named 2015.
- 1677 Tycho Brahe, discovered 1940, and Brahe (55 Cancri Ac), an exoplanet, named 2015.
- 3552 Don Quixote, discovered 1983, and Quijote (Mu Arae b), an exoplanet, named 2015.
- 10385 Amaterasu, discovered 1996, and Amateru (Epsilon Tauri b), an exoplanet, named 2015.
- 11284 Belenus, discovered 1990, and Bélénos (HD 8574), a star, named 2019.
- 189011 Ogmios, discovered 1997, and Ogma (HD 149026), a star, named 2015.
- Aegir, a moon of Saturn, named 2007 and Ægir (Epsilon Eridani b), an exoplanet, named 2015.

== Bodies with similar names and different referents ==
- 66 Maja, discovered 1861, named after Maia, from Greek mythology; and 127936 Maia, named after Maia Palomba, second daughter of Ernesto Palomba.
- 100 Hekate, discovered 1868, named after Hecate, the Greek goddess of witchcraft; and 2245 Hekatostos, discovered 1968, named for the Greek word for "100", in honour of a joint program.
- 558 Carmen, discovered 1905, named after the title character of Bizet's Carmen; and Carme, a moon of Jupiter, discovered 1938, named after the mythological Carme, mother by Zeus of the goddess Britomartis.
- 832 Karin, discovered 1916, named after Karin Månsdotter, the Queen of King Erik XIV of Sweden; and Kari, a moon of Saturn, discovered 2006, named after Kári, the personification of wind in Norse mythology.
- 1042 Amazone, discovered 1925, named after the Amazon Rainforest; and 129555 Armazones, discovered 1996, named after Cerro Armazones in Chile.
- 1131 Porzia, discovered 1929, named for Porcia Catonis, wife of Marcus Junius Brutus; and Portia, a moon of Uranus, discovered 1986, named for the character Portia in William Shakespeare's play The Merchant of Venice.
- 1862 Apollo, discovered 1932, named after Apollo, the god of music in Greek mythology; 2228 Soyuz-Apollo, discovered 1977, named after the Apollo–Soyuz combined mission, and 12609 Apollodoros, discovered 1960, named after Apollodorus of Athens.
- 2313 Aruna, discovered 1976, named after the charioteer of Surya in Hinduism; and 20000 Varuna, discovered 2000, named after the Hindu deity Varuna, the god of water.
- 9313 Protea, discovered 1988, named after the Proteaceae family of plants; and Proteus, a moon of Neptune, discovered 1989, named after Proteus, a sea god from Greek mythology.
- 9986 Hirokun, discovered 1996, named after Hiroshi Fukazawa, the daughter of Takeshi Urata, one of the discovers; and Hyrrokkin, a moon of Saturn, discovered 2004, named after Hyrrokkin, a giantess from Norse mythology.
- 582 Olympia, discovered 1906, named after the town of Archaia Olympia in Greece; and Olympias, discovered 2009, the moon of 317 Roxane, named after Olympias, the mother of Alexander the Great.
- 98 Ianthe, discovered 1868, 411 Xanthe, discovered 1896, and Anthe, a moon of Saturn discovered 2007.
- 4544 Xanthus, discovered 1989, named after Xanthus, and 145593 Xántus, discovered 2006, named after János Xántus.

== Bodies with different names and the same referent ==
Several bodies have completely distinct names, but may be confused because their names refer to the same thing or the same mythological character. This is usually true when one name is Latin and another Greek, and causes special confusion in Greek, where the Greek forms of all mythological names are used in preference to the Latin names.

=== Conflicts with non-minor or Solar System bodies ===
Some of the conflicts are with planets and satellites, or other astronomical objects with long-established names.

- The Sun and Helium, discovered 1868, and 895 Helio, discovered 1918.
- The Moon and Phoebe, discovered 1898, and 580 Selene, discovered 1905.
- Earth and 1184 Gaea, discovered 1926.
- Venus and 1388 Aphrodite, discovered 1935, and 7088 Ishtar, discovered 1992.
- Mercury and 69230 Hermes, named 1937 (but not numbered until 2003).
- Neptune, discovered 1846 and 4341 Poseidon, discovered 1987. Poseidon was also an unofficial name for Jupiter's moon Pasiphae 1955–1975.
- Jupiter and 5731 Zeus, discovered 1988, and Tinia, a moon of 55637 Uni, discovered 2005.
- Uranus, discovered 1781, and 30 Urania, discovered 1854. Uranus, however, is mostly named after the Greek god personifying the sky.
- There was a potential conflict between Saturn and Cronus, a suggested name for Pluto, discovered 1930. "Kronos" is also a nickname for the star HD 240430.
- 10 Hygiea, discovered 1849, and Valetudo, a moon of Jupiter discovered 2018. Named for Hygieia (Valetudo in Roman mythology), the goddess of personal healing.
- There was also a potential conflict between Hades, an unofficial name for Sinope, a moon of Jupiter between 1955 and 1975, and Pluto.
- Vulcan, a hypothetical planet once proposed to exist in an orbit between Mercury and the Sun, and 2212 Hephaistos, discovered 1978.
- Theia, a planet supposed to have collided with the early Earth, producing the Moon as a result, and 106 Dione, discovered 1868, and 405 Thia, discovered 1895. The equivalence between Dione and Thia is less certain.
- Tyche, a hypothetical planet residing in the Oort cloud whose existence was ruled out in 2014, and 19 Fortuna, discovered 1852, and 258 Tyche, discovered 1886.
- Siarnaq, a moon of Saturn discovered 2000, and 90377 Sedna, discovered 2003.

=== Conflicts among asteroids ===
Other conflicts occurred between asteroids discovered earlier and those discovered later.

- 1 Ceres, discovered 1801 and 1108 Demeter, discovered 1929. Demeter was also an unofficial name for Jupiter's moon Lysithea 1955–1975. Named for the goddess Demeter. (In Greek, both objects are named Demeter, as 1 Ceres was discovered at a time when new "planets" were being named in Greek after the Greek equivalents of the Latin mythological names they were given upon discovery. As a result, 1 Ceres was given the Modern Greek name Δήμητρα (Dēmētra). Later, when 1108 was discovered and named, to avoid conflict it was given the Ancient Greek form, Δημήτηρ (Dēmētēr).)
- 2 Pallas, named 1802, 93 Minerva, discovered 1867, and 881 Athene, discovered 1917. It might be argued that "Pallas" here does not actually refer to the goddess Athene, but rather her mythological companion Pallas; however, in the 19th century "Pallas" was commonly used as shorthand for "Pallas Athene", and in the company of Ceres, Juno, and Vesta, it seems more likely that Athene was intended.
- 3 Juno, discovered 1804, 103 Hera, discovered 1868 and 55637 Uni, discovered 2002. Hera was also an unofficial name for Jupiter's moon Elara 1955–1975. Named for the goddess Hera.
- 4 Vesta, discovered 1807 and 46 Hestia, discovered 1857. Hestia was also an unofficial name for Jupiter's moon Himalia 1955–1975. Named for the goddess Hestia.
- 5 Astraea, discovered 1845, 24 Themis, discovered 1853, 99 Dike, discovered 1868, and 269 Justitia, discovered 1887. Named for goddesses of Justice.
- 8 Flora, discovered 1847 and 410 Chloris, discovered 1896. Named for the goddess of flowers. Cf. Flora and Chloris.
- 12 Victoria, discovered 1850 and 307 Nike, discovered 1891. Named for the goddess of victory. Cf. Nike and Victoria.
- 78 Diana, discovered 1863 and 105 Artemis, discovered 1868 and 395 Delia and 15992 Cynthia. These names all refer to the goddess Artemis, the last two being epithets derived from placenames associated with the goddess.
- 94 Aurora, discovered 1867 and 221 Eos discovered 1882. Named for the goddess of the dawn.
- 104 Klymene, discovered 1868 and 356217 Clymene, discovered 2009. 104 Klymene was named after one of the many Clymenes in Greek mythology, while 356217 Clymene was named specifically after the Cretan princess; the daughter of King Catreus.
- 424 Gratia discovered 1896 and 627 Charis discovered 1907. Named for any one of the Graces.
- 14 Irene, discovered 1851 and 679 Pax, discovered 1909. Named for the goddess of peace.
- 378 Holmia, discovered 1893 and 10552 Stockholm, discovered 1993, named for Stockholm.
- 433 Eros, discovered 1898 and 763 Cupido, discovered 1913 and 1221 Amor discovered 1932, the first being the Greek, and the second and third Latin renditions of the name of Eros, the god of love.
- 932 Hooveria, discovered 1920 and 1363 Herberta, discovered 1935, named for Herbert Hoover.
- 2063 Bacchus, discovered 1977 and 3671 Dionysus, discovered 1984, named for the god of wine.
- 1125 China, discovered 1957 and 3789 Zhongguo, discovered 1928, named for China.
- 1133 Lugduna, discovered 1929 and 12490 Leiden, discovered 1977, named for Leiden.
- 1188 Gothlandia, discovered 1930 and 13868 Catalonia, discovered 1999, named for Catalonia.
- 2199 Kleť, discovered 1978, 20964 Mons Naklethi, discovered 1977 and 68779 Schöninger, discovered 2002, named for Kleť Mountain.
- 2403 Šumava, discovered 1979 and 8554 Gabreta, discovered 1995, named for the Bohemian Forest.
- 2524 Budovicium, discovered 1981 and 11134 České Budějovice, discovered 1996, named for České Budějovice.
- 2747 Český Krumlov, discovered 1980 and 69469 Krumbenowe, discovered 1996, named for Český Krumlov.
- 3400 Aotearoa, discovered 1981 and 386622 New Zealand, discovered 2009, named for New Zealand.
- 4352 Kyoto, discovered 1989 and 7023 Heiankyo, discovered 1992, named for Kyoto.
- 9431 Pytho, discovered 1996 and 73769 Delphi, discovered 1994, named for Delphi.
- 11780 Thunder Bay, discovered 1942 and 20031 Lakehead, discovered 1992, named for Thunder Bay.
- 14486 Tuscia, discovered 1994 and 207563 Toscana, discovered 2006, named for Tuscany.
- 30798 Graubünden, discovered 1989 and 858332 Grischun, discovered 2012, named for Grisons.

=== Conflicts with extrasolar bodies ===
- 13131 Palmyra, discovered 1994, and Tadmor, also known as Gamma Cephei Ab, confirmed in 2003, named after Palmyra.
- 14566 Hōkūleʻa, named 2003 after the Hawaiian name for the star Arcturus.
- Sagarmatha, also known as HD 100777, and 33002 Everest, discovered 1997, named after Mount Everest.
- Pollux and Polydeuces, discovered 2004, named after one of the Dioscuri

== See also ==
- Naming of moons
