= Minor-planet designation =

Number-name combination assigned to minor planets

There are three internationally standardized designations for minor planets, which are assigned by the Minor Planet Center (MPC). In order of assignment, these are:

1. an initial provisional designation, for all announced discoveries, that reflects the date of discovery;
2. a permanent designation: a catalog number assigned sequentially once the object has a securely determined orbit;

and, for a little under 2% of objects,

3. a proper name.

For clarity and cross-referencing, it is usual for astronomical sources to identify a numbered object by both its permanent and provisional designations, or by its permanent designation (number) and name, at least in tables and for first mentions in a text. Such concatenations are not in themselves official names and do not have a fixed order or punctuation.

Comets are also managed by the MPC, as are interstellar interlopers passing through the Solar System, but for them different cataloguing systems are used.

== Summary ==
A provisional designation is automatically assigned when an object is reported to the Minor Planet Center (MPC), a branch of the International Astronomical Union, after at least two-night's observation. A permanent designation (sequential number) is assigned by the MPC once the orbital path is sufficiently secured for the object to be recoverable. A name is optional, and must be unique (the spelling must differ from all other minor planets when stripped of diacritics).

An object commonly has more than one provisional designation. This is typically because multiple observations were reported to the MPC and independently assigned provisional designations, only for them to later be recognized as being the same object. An example is 2010 AU118, which was lost with less than two days' observation, and 15 years later recovered as 2025 ES_{3}. In such cases, one of the labels will be chosen as the "primary provisional designation" (this is usually the one associated with the credited discoverer), which will then be used in most circumstances; the others are "secondary". With 2010 AU_{118}, it was the older designation that was chosen to be primary, but this is not always the case. A contrary example is (4337) Arecibo, which was assigned 1933 HE (reported to the MPC in 1933), 1979 FR_{3} and 1979 HG_{2} (both reported to the MPC in 1981 without being recognized as the same object), and 1985 GB (reported to the MPC in 1985), where it was the last designation that was chosen to be primary, perhaps because its orbit was secured under that identification.

Over half of known minor planets have permanent designations (numbers). (See List of unnumbered minor planets.) Independent discoveries of an object may result in multiple provisional designations, but the requirement for a secure orbit means that the permanent designation is a unique identifier, apart from historical errors. In practice, a permanent designation can usually be assigned after the orbit has been secured by four well-observed oppositions. For near-Earth asteroids that have short orbital periods, one might be assigned after three or even two oppositions, whereas distant objects may require more. (2014 UZ224, for example, has not been assigned a permanent designation even after seven oppositions, as the uncertainty of its orbit is still large.)

Once a permanent designation has been assigned, the object is eligible for naming. The discoverer has the sole right to propose a name, subject to approval by the MPC, for ten years from the date it receives its permanent designation, after which time the option is open to the public (and to the MPC itself). The name must be unique: historically this only applied among minor planets (thus the asteroid 52 Europa and the Jovian moon Europa share a name), but since about 2005 names proposed for asteroids and moons have been rejected due to conflicts between them. Among the nearly a million minor planets that have been numbered, only about twenty six thousand (or 3%) have received a name; this percentage can be expected to decrease as the rate of discoveries accelerates.

== Syntax ==
In indexes and catalogues, compound designations are typically used for numbered objects. Thus the provisional designation alone will be used if the object is unnumbered, the number and provisional designation (or occasionally just the number) for numbered objects that have no name, and the number together with the name, or even all three designations, for named objects. This helps ensure that the object can be cross-referenced.

When the permanent designation/number is used alongside a second designation, the IAU and WGSBN present them thus:

- for unnumbered minor planets: 2006 DP14
- for numbered but unnamed minor planets: (388188) 2006 DP14
- for named minor planets: (274301) Wikipedia

The parentheses around the permanent designation are a historical remnant of the numbered disks used as symbols of early asteroids, such as ④ as the planetary symbol of Vesta (now (4) Vesta).

Other authorities use slightly different formats. The JPL Small-Body Database uses the forms:

- for unnumbered minor planets: (2006 DP14)
- for numbered but unnamed minor planets: 388188 (2006 DP14)
- for named minor planets: 274301 Wikipedia or 274301 Wikipedia (2008 QH24)

Here parentheses are not used to delimit the permanent designation, but are used to set off the provisional designation. JPL does not subscript the index number on its website, but professionally printed sources that cite JPL often do, for e.g.

- 388188 (2006 DP_{14}).

JPL occasionally uses more than one provisional designation, typically for recovered objects where both are notable. For example:

- 517103 (2013 EM20 = 2008 AO112).

The Minor Planet Center does not use any particular format. It may refer to a numberless object by its provisional designation: 2006 DP_{14}, a numbered object by its permanent designation: (388188), and a named and numbered objection by both: (274301) Wikipedia. When equating these various designations, as when publishing new permanent designations that it has assigned, it may identify them as either

- (388188) = 2006 DP_{14} or
- 2006 DP_{14} = (388188),

depending on which designation is being identified with which. The same may be done with named asteroids, and where more than one provisional designation has been assigned to an object (due to multiple discoveries, or to its having been lost and later identified with another designated object), these may be appended with additional equal signs. Online, the MPC doesn't bother to subscript the indices, resulting in identifications such as:

- (274301) Wikipedia = 2007 FK34 = 1997 RO4 = 2008 QH24.

When the main-belt asteroid Wikipedia was discovered (or actually rediscovered) in August 2008, for example, it was provisionally designated 2008 QH_{24}, and it later received the permanent designation (274301). On 27 January 2013, it was named Wikipedia, and the announcement was published in the Minor Planet Circulars with the identification:

- (274301) Wikipedia = 2008 QH_{24}.

=== Satellites ===
Satellites of minor planets are not automatically assigned a provisional designation when they are announced. There are thus many satellites that have no formal designation at all.

Once the orbit is secured, they are given a provisional designation of the form "S" (for "satellite") + the year of discovery + the permanent or provisional designation of the primary, followed by a discovery number. For example, the first known satellite of (87) Sylvia, discovered in 2001, was assigned the provisional designation S/2001 (87) 1; its second moon was discovered in 2004 and designated S/2004 (87) 1. (The discovery number is issued in case more than one satellite of that body is discovered in the same year. However, that situation is uncommon, and the discovery number will therefore usually be "1".)

The Roman numeral convention that has been used, on and off, for moons of the planets since Galileo's time, may be applied as a permanent designation. Not all satellites, or even named satellites, are assigned a permanent designation, but the two Sylvian moons were designated I and II, respectively. Combining this designation with that of the primary typically takes the form (87) Sylvia I and (87) Sylvia II.

Unlike with primary minor planets, naming does not require a satellite to have a permanent designation; in fact, Roman-numeral permanent designations are often assigned after the moons are named. Sylvia's first moon was named Romulus and the second Remus. A common format for combining the permanent designations and names is (87) Sylvia I Romulus and (87) Sylvia II Remus. In MPC publications, these may be (87) Sylvia I = Romulus and (87) Sylvia II = Remus. The compound format is required for secure identification (if one wishes to use the name at all) because the name alone may be ambiguous: Romulus for example shares its name with the asteroid 10386 Romulus (1996 TS_{15}).

== History ==
Minor planets were initially identified by a female classical name and abbreviated with an associated iconic symbol, as was (and still is) the practice for the major planets. By 1851 there were fifteen known asteroids, all with their own symbol (though some symbols were published as only a verbal description): (Ceres), (Pallas), (Juno), (Vesta), (Astraea), (Hebe), (Iris), (Flora), (Metis), (Hygiea), (Parthenope), (Victoria), (Egeria), (Irene) and (Eunomia). The symbols grew increasingly complex as the number of objects grew, and publishers found typesetting them increasingly difficult. This difficulty was addressed by Benjamin Apthorp Gould in 1851, who suggested numbering asteroids in their order of discovery (initially starting with the fifth asteroid, Astraea, but within a year resetting to Ceres), and placing this number in a circle (a planetary disk) as the symbol for the asteroid – for example ④ replacing as the new symbol of the fourth asteroid, Vesta. The new symbols were adopted by the Astronomical Journal in 1852. Other publications used the numbered disks to augment the iconic symbols, gradually reducing the iconic symbols to just the first four asteroids. The numbered disks were soon coupled with the name, e.g. ④ Vesta, for clarity as the number of minor planets increased. Within a few years the circle started being simplified to parentheses, e.g. (4) Vesta. The Astronomical Journal used both formats for decades, fully committing to parentheses only in 1895, and the numbered disks continued to be used by the Paris Observatory until 1908 (with numbers into the hundreds) and by the U.S. Naval Observatory until 1949.

Another nine iconic symbols were published in the first three years after the introduction of numbered disks as the generic symbol for minor planets, after which the tradition ceased completely. None of the iconic symbols after the first four saw any notable use beyond the 19th century, and little within it. More reduced punctuation soon developed, such as 4) Vesta, 4, Vesta and 4 Vesta, but the 4) and 4, formats had more or less completely died out by 1949, leaving just the current (4) and 4.

The precursor to the modern system of provisional designations first appeared in the journal Astronomische Nachrichten in 1892, and the current format has been in place since 1925. There were some later exceptions, such as the Palomar–Leiden survey designations that were assigned between 1960 and 1977, but today all minor planets with elliptical orbits are assigned provisional designations following the MPC convention.

A notable outlier to the pattern that the permanent designation reflects the order of discovery (or these days securing the orbit) is the case of (134 340) Pluto. Since Pluto was initially classified as a planet, it was not given a minor-planet number until after a 2006 redefinition of "planet" that excluded it. A proposal a few years earlier to reserve the number (100 000) for Pluto, paralleling other round numbers that had been assigned out of sequence for the notable objects (20 000) Varuna and (50 000) Quaoar, was not acted on in the debate over whether a number should be assigned at all. Pluto's minor-planet number is largely a formality, and is rarely used in practice.

== See also ==
- List of minor planets, see index
- Astronomical naming conventions
- Meanings of minor-planet names
- Name conflicts with minor planets
