= Klytaemnestra =

Klytaemnestra may refer to:

- An alternative spelling of Clytemnestra, wife of Agamemnon in Greek mythology
- 179 Klytaemnestra, asteroid
- Klytaemnestra family, asteroid family
