= Eurynome (disambiguation) =

Eurynome may refer to:

- Eurynome, name of multiple figures in Greek mythology
  - Eurynome (Oceanid), an archaic divine figure
- 79 Eurynome, an asteroid
- "Eurynome", a song by Sakanaction from Adapt (2022)

== See also ==
- Eurydome (moon), moon of Jupiter
