= 133 =

133 may refer to:

- 133 (number), the natural number following 132 and preceding 134
- AD 133
- 133 BC
- 133 (song)
- 133 (New Jersey bus)
- 133 Cyrene, a main-belt asteroid
- SEAT 133, also known as the Fiat 133 and Nasr 133, a city car
