= Name conflict =

Name conflict may refer to:

- Name collision
- Identifier#Implicit context and namespace conflicts
- Name mangling
- Name conflicts in astronomy

== See also ==
- Scope (computer programming)
