= 139 Juewa =

Main-belt asteroid

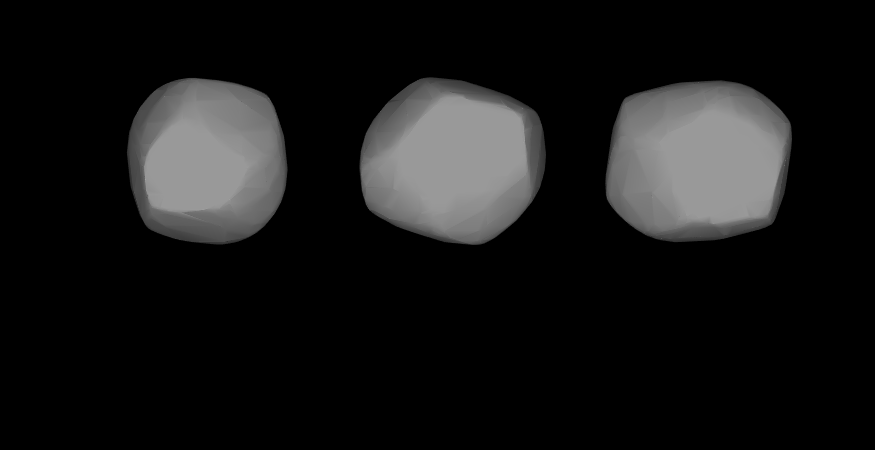
- Lightcurve-based 3D model of 139 Juewa

Discovery
- Discovered by: James Craig Watson
- Discovery date: 10 October 1874

Designations
- Pronunciation: English: /dʒuˈeɪwɑː/ joo-AY-wah; Mandarin: [ɻwêɪxwǎ]
- Alternative designations: A874 TA
- Minor planet category: Main belt

Orbital characteristics
- Epoch 31 July 2016 (JD 2457600.5)
- Uncertainty parameter 0
- Observation arc: 121.07 yr (44222 d)
- Aphelion: 3.26884 AU (489.012 Gm)
- Perihelion: 2.29261 AU (342.970 Gm)
- Semi-major axis: 2.78073 AU (415.991 Gm)
- Eccentricity: 0.17553
- Orbital period (sidereal): 4.64 yr (1693.7 d)
- Mean anomaly: 60.2817°
- Mean motion: 0° 12^{m} 45.187^{s} / day
- Inclination: 10.9127°
- Longitude of ascending node: 1.83417°
- Argument of perihelion: 165.566°

Physical characteristics
- Dimensions: 148.3±4.3 km × 142.3±15.6 km
- Mean diameter: 151.116±1.596 km 161.43±7.38 km (composite estimate)
- Mass: (5.54±2.20)×10^{18} kg (composite estimate) (3.262 ± 0.778/0.933)×10^{18} kg (2.35±0.40)×10^{18} kg (Note: Calculated from its standard gravitational parameter GM = 0.157±0.027 km^{3}/s^{2}.)
- Mean density: 2.51±1.05 g/cm^{3} 1.805 ± 0.430/0.516 g/cm^{3} 1.30 g/cm^{3} (Note: Assuming a diameter of 151 km.)
- Equatorial surface gravity: 0.0438 m/s²
- Equatorial escape velocity: 0.0828 km/s
- Synodic rotation period: 20.991 h (0.8746 d)
- Geometric albedo: 0.052±0.015; 0.0444±0.0164
- Temperature: ~167 K
- Spectral type: CP (Tholen)
- Absolute magnitude (H): 8.06, 7.924

139 Juewa
- Traditional Chinese: 瑞華星
- Simplified Chinese: 瑞华星
- Literal meaning: "Auspicious star of Huaxia" / "Star of China's fortune"
Transcriptions
Standard Mandarin
- Hanyu Pinyin: Ruìhuáxīng
- Wade–Giles: jui^{4} hua^{2} hsing^{1}
- IPA: [ɻwêɪxwǎɕíŋ]

139 Juewa (/dʒuˈeɪwɑː/ joo-AY-wah) is a very large and dark main belt asteroid. It is probably composed of primitive carbonaceous material. It was the first asteroid discovered from China.

Juewa was discovered from Beijing by the visiting American astronomer James Craig Watson on 10 October 1874; Watson was in China to observe the transit of Venus. Watson asked Prince Gong to name the asteroid. Gong's choice was 瑞華星 (roughly, "Star of China's fortune"). Watson used the first two characters ('star' being redundant), transliterating them Juewa in Wade convention of the time. (In pinyin, 瑞華 is transliterated ruìhuá.)

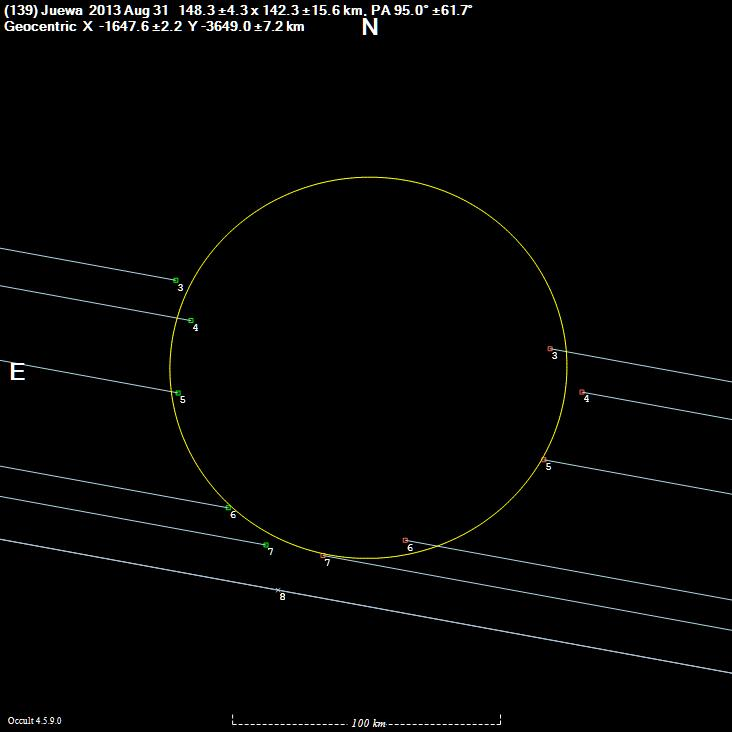
Multichord occultation by 139 Juewa, observed 31 August 2013 from N.S.W., Australia.

Since 1988 there have been 8 reported stellar occultations by Juewa. From the occultation on 31 August 2013 the best fit ellipse measures 148.3±4.3 km × 142.3±15.6 km.

13-cm radar observations of this asteroid from the Arecibo Observatory between 1980 and 1985 were used to produce a diameter estimate of 172 km. Based upon radar data, the near surface solid density of the asteroid is 1.5±0.5 g/cm^{3}.
