= 132 Aethra =

Mars-crossing asteroid

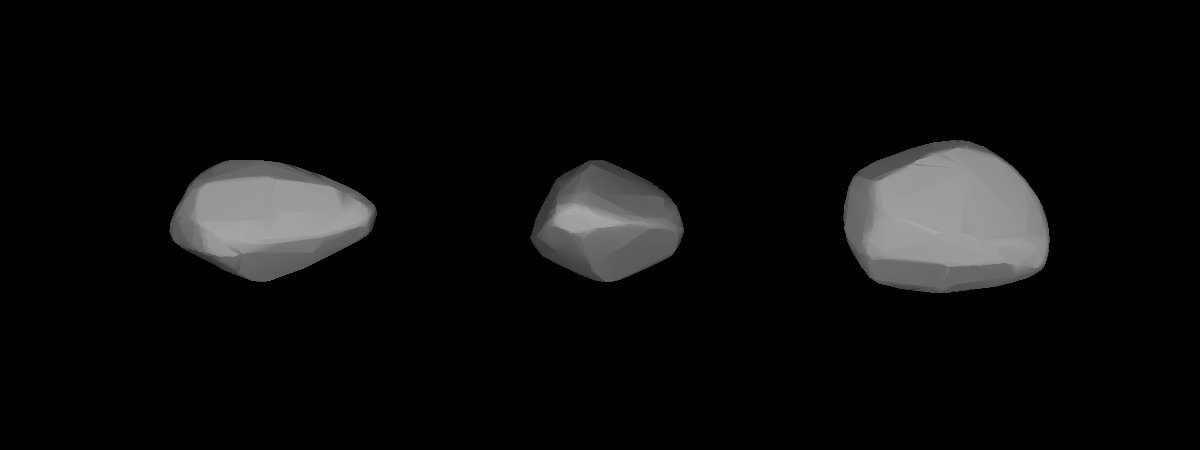
- Lightcurve-based 3D-model of Aethra

Discovery
- Discovered by: James C. Watson
- Discovery site: Angell Hall Observatory
- Discovery date: 13 June 1873

Designations
- Pronunciation: /ˈiːθrə/
- Named after: Aethra
- Alternative designations: A873 LA · A922 XB · 1949 MD · 1953 LF (Note: The MPC notates Aethra's retroactive new-style designations as 1873 LA and 1922 XB.)
- Minor planet category: Mars crosser

Orbital characteristics
- Epoch 21 November 2025 (JD 2461000.5)
- Uncertainty parameter 0
- Observation arc: 152.30 yr (55628 d)
- Aphelion: 3.6230 AU (541.99 Gm)
- Perihelion: 1.6012 AU (239.54 Gm)
- Semi-major axis: 2.6121 AU (390.76 Gm)
- Eccentricity: 0.3870
- Orbital period (sidereal): 4.2217 yr (1541.9 d)
- Average orbital speed: 17.72 km/s
- Mean anomaly: 113.0611°
- Mean motion: 0° 14^{m} 0.24^{s} / day
- Inclination: 24.9835°
- Longitude of ascending node: 258.0509°
- Argument of perihelion: 255.6188°
- Earth MOID: 0.7822 AU
- Jupiter MOID: 2.2051 AU
- T_{Jupiter}: 3.176

Physical characteristics
- Mean diameter: 42.87±1.6 km 44.47±0.74 km
- Mass: (1.59 ± 0.89/0.42)×10^{17} kg
- Mean density: 3.447 ± 1.935/0.923 g/cm^{3}
- Synodic rotation period: 5.1684 h (0.21535 d)
- Geometric albedo: 0.1990±0.015
- Spectral type: M-type (Tholen); Xe-type (Bus)
- Absolute magnitude (H): 8.96

132 Aethra is a metallic asteroid and Mars-crosser on an eccentric orbit from the asteroid belt. It was discovered by James Craig Watson on 13 June 1873 at Angell Hall Observatory in Ann Arbor, Michigan. It is the first Mars-crossing asteroid to be identified. It subsequently became a lost asteroid, and was only rediscovered in December 1922. It is named after Aethra, the mother of Theseus in Greek mythology.

Aethra measures approximately 43–44 kilometers in diameter and has a rotation period slightly longer than five hours. It is the largest and brightest of the Mars-crossers and is classified as an M-type asteroid under the Tholen classification scheme. Its surface is relatively reflective and is likely composed of various silicate, hydroxide, and iron-bearing minerals.

== History and naming ==
Aethra was discovered by astronomer James Craig Watson on 13 June 1873 at Angell Hall Observatory in Ann Arbor, Michigan. Its discovery, alongside that of 133 Cyrene, was announced in the journal Astronomische Nachrichten on 30 August. By 1874, the asteroid was named Aethra after the Greek mythological figure Aethra, mother of Theseus. Watson only obtained an observation arc of 22 days, insufficient to constrain its orbit very well. The usual method for calculating the orbits of asteroids discovered by Watson were inadequate due to Aethra's large orbital eccentricity, and the asteroid subsequently became lost.

On 12 December 1922, Aethra was rediscovered as 1922 NA by astronomer Benjamin Jekhowsky at Algiers Observatory. It was independently observed by G. Beljavsky on 19 December at Simeiz Observatory. Calculations of its orbit strongly indicated that it was the lost asteroid, and Aethra's recovery was announced in the journal Nature on 3 February 1923. In 1925, the system of provisional designation was changed to its current system. The Minor Planet Center (MPC) retroactively applied the new-style designations to those made before 1925, thus replacing 1922 NA with A922 XB.

== Orbit ==
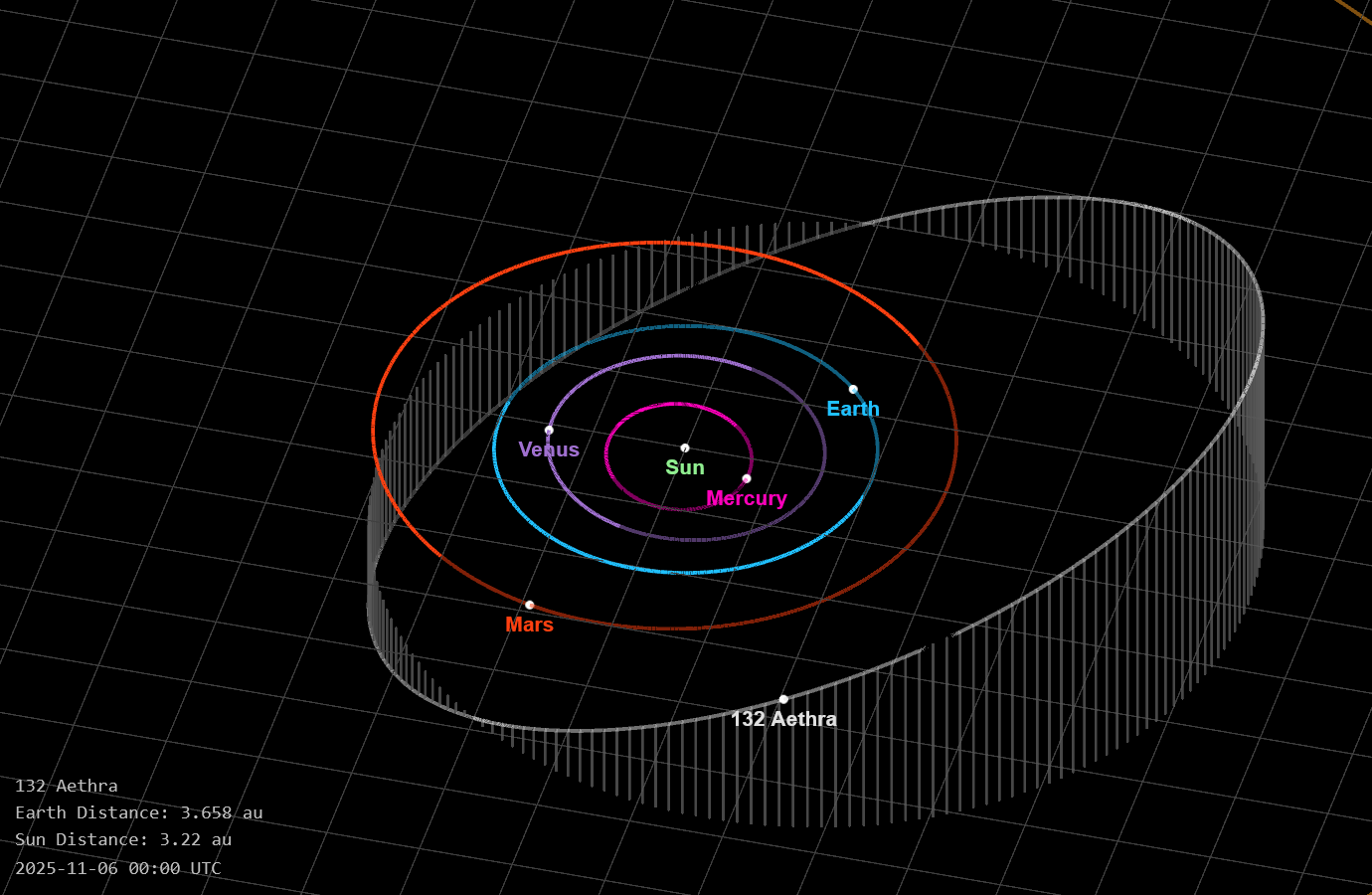
An orbital diagram of Aethra, with the orbits of the inner planets and the ecliptic grid shown.

Aethra orbits the Sun at an average distance—its semi-major axis—of 2.61 astronomical units (AU), taking 4.22 years to complete one orbit. Due to its eccentricity of 0.39, its distance from the Sun varies from 1.60 AU at perihelion to 3.62 AU at aphelion, crossing the orbit of Mars. It is the first Mars-crossing asteroid discovered. Its orbital inclination is high, with a value of 24.98° with respect to the ecliptic plane.

Despite crossing Mars's orbit, Aethra appears to be dynamically stable. A 2023 study by Julio Fernández and Michel Helal found that in simulations, its orbit remains stable for 2 billion years (Gyr). Aethra is protected from destabilizing close encounters with Mars by a Kozai resonance. This resonance couples variations in its perihelion distance with the precession of its argument of perihelion such that whenever its perihelion is at a minimum, it is located away from the ecliptic plane, distancing Aethra from Mars. Occasionally, its perihelion is raised enough that its orbit no longer crosses Mars's.

== Physical characteristics ==
Aethra has an estimated diameter of 42.87 ± 1.6 kilometres (26.64 ± 0.99 mi) or 44.47 ± 0.74 kilometres (27.63 ± 0.46 mi). Along with its absolute magnitude of 8.96, it is the largest and brightest Mars-crossing asteroid. Observations of Aethra's lightcurve, or variations in its apparent brightness as it rotates, suggests a rotation period of about 5.17 hours.

Under the Tholen classification scheme, Aethra is classified as an M-type asteroid. The Bus classification scheme meanwhile classifies it as an Xe-type asteroid. Aethra's geometric albedo is about 0.2, and its spectrum is significantly red. Absorption features in its spectrum indicates the presence of phyllosilicate and hydroxide minerals and water ice, and the iron-rich chamosite may be the primary surface mineral on some regions on the asteroid. These features are broadly consistent with the compositions of CI and CM chondrites, but albedo and spectral slope dissimilarities rule out Aethra as a parent body of these meteorites. Variations in Aethra's spectrum seen between May and August 2008 may be caused by variable abundances of phyllosilicates or opaque surface minerals with rotation or an undiscovered moon with a distinct composition.
