= 150 Nuwa =

Main-belt asteroid

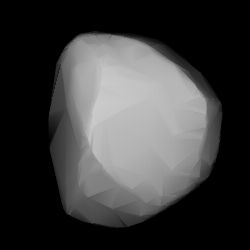
- 3D convex shape model of 150 Nuwa

Discovery
- Discovered by: J. C. Watson
- Discovery date: 18 October 1875

Designations
- Pronunciation: /ˈnjuːwɑː/
- Named after: Nüwa
- Alternative designations: A875 UA; 1908 AL; 2002 JR_{70}
- Minor planet category: Main belt

Orbital characteristics
- Epoch 31 July 2016 (JD 2457600.5)
- Uncertainty parameter 0
- Observation arc: 116.94 yr (42714 d)
- Aphelion: 3.3586 AU (502.44 Gm)
- Perihelion: 2.6084 AU (390.21 Gm)
- Semi-major axis: 2.9835 AU (446.33 Gm)
- Eccentricity: 0.12573
- Orbital period (sidereal): 5.15 yr (1882.3 d)
- Mean anomaly: 138.03°
- Mean motion: 0° 11^{m} 28.536^{s} / day
- Inclination: 2.1937°
- Longitude of ascending node: 206.21°
- Argument of perihelion: 151.84°

Physical characteristics
- Dimensions: 151.13±4.5 km 146.54 ± 9.15 km (composite estimate)
- Mass: (1.62 ± 0.20) × 10^{18} kg (composite estimate) (1.65±0.19)×10^{18} kg (Note: Calculated from its standard gravitational parameter GM = 0.110±0.013 km^{3}/s^{2}.)
- Mean density: 0.98 ± 0.22 g/cm^{3} 1.87 g/cm^{3} (Note: Assuming a diameter of 119 km.)
- Synodic rotation period: 8.14 hours 8.1347 h (0.33895 d)
- Geometric albedo: 0.0395±0.002
- Spectral type: C
- Absolute magnitude (H): 8.23

150 Nuwa is a large main-belt asteroid with an orbital period of 5.15 years. It was discovered by Canadian-American astronomer James Craig Watson on 18 October 1875, and named after Nüwa, the Chinese creator goddess. This object is a candidate member of the Hecuba group of asteroids that orbit near the 2:1 mean-motion resonance with Jupiter. Based upon the spectrum it is classified as a C-type asteroid, which indicates that it is probably composed of primitive carbonaceous chondritic material and the surface is exceedingly dark.

Photometric observations of this asteroid at the Catania Astrophysical Observatory during 1992 and 1993 gave a light curve with a period of 8.140 ± 0.005 hours. In 2004, an additional photometric study was performed at Swilken Brae Observatory in St Andrews, Fife, yielding a probable period of 8.1364 ± 0.0008 hours and a brightness variation of 0.26 ± 0.03 in magnitude. A 2011 study from Organ Mesa Observatory in Las Cruces, New Mexico gave a period of 8.1347 ± 0.0001 hours with a brightness variation of 0.17 ± 0.02 magnitude, which is consistent with prior results.

On 17 December 1999, a star was occulted by Nuwa.
