= Watson (crater) =

Lunar impact crater

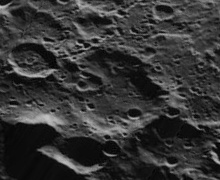
- Oblique Lunar Orbiter 5 image, facing west
- Coordinates: 62.6°S 124.5°W
- Diameter: 64 km
- Depth: Unknown
- Colongitude: 125° at sunrise
- Eponym: James C. Watson

Watson is a lunar impact crater that is located in the low southern latitudes on the far side of the Moon. It lies to the southwest of the larger crater Lippmann and southeast of Fizeau.

This is a worn crater formation with an outer edge that has been eroded to the point where it has lost much of its definition and now forms a rounded, uneven edge. A number of small craterlets lie along the edge and within the interior. A merged pair of small craters lies along the southern edge of the floor and inner wall. There is a small, cup-shaped crater along the northeast edge of the interior floor. Whether the crater once possessed a central peak is no longer apparent.

== Satellite craters ==
By convention these features are identified on lunar maps by placing the letter on the side of the crater midpoint that is closest to Watson.

Watson	Latitude	Longitude	Diameter
G	63.3° S	120.3° W	34 km
