= 128 Nemesis =

Main-belt asteroid

- VLT-SPHERE image of Nemesis

Discovery
- Discovered by: James Craig Watson
- Discovery date: 25 November 1872

Designations
- Pronunciation: /ˈnɛmɪsɪs/
- Named after: Nemesis
- Alternative designations: A872 WA; 1952 HW_{1}
- Minor planet category: main-belt · Nemesis
- Adjectives: Nemesian /nəˈmiːʒ(i)ən/

Orbital characteristics
- Epoch 23 March 2018 (JD 2458200.5)
- Uncertainty parameter 0
- Observation arc: 144.93 yr (52,934 d)
- Aphelion: 3.10 AU (463.69 Gm)
- Perihelion: 2.40 AU (359.00 Gm)
- Semi-major axis: 2.75 AU (411.35 Gm)
- Eccentricity: 0.1272
- Orbital period (sidereal): 4.56 years (1,665 d)
- Mean anomaly: 345.49°
- Mean motion: 0° 12^{m} 58.32^{s} / day
- Inclination: 6.2453°
- Longitude of ascending node: 76.243°
- Argument of perihelion: 303.82°

Physical characteristics
- Dimensions: (178 × 163 × 147) ± 5 km
- Mean diameter: 163±5 km
- Mass: (4.67±0.15)×10^{18} kg (Note: Calculated from its standard gravitational parameter GM = 0.312±0.010 km^{3}/s^{2}.)
- Mean density: 2.06±0.20 g/cm^{3}
- Synodic rotation period: 38.9325±0.0001 h
- Axial tilt: 104°
- Pole ecliptic longitude: 313° ± 2°
- Pole ecliptic latitude: −19° ± 1°
- Geometric albedo: 0.067 (calculated); 0.067±0.005
- Spectral type: Tholen = C SMASS = C
- Absolute magnitude (H): 7.49; 7.70

128 Nemesis is a large 160 km main-belt asteroid, of carbonaceous composition. It rotates somewhat slowly, taking about 39 hours to complete one rotation. Nemesis is the largest member of the Nemesian asteroid family bearing its name. It was discovered by J. C. Watson on 25 November 1872, and named after Nemesis, the goddess of retribution in Greek mythology.

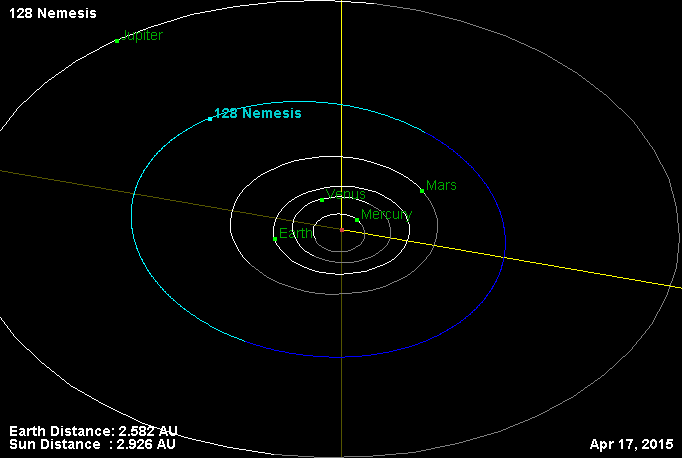
Diagram of Nemesis's orbit

This object is orbiting the Sun with a period of 4.56 years and an eccentricity (ovalness) of 0.13. The orbital plane is inclined by 6.2° to the plane of the ecliptic. It is categorized as a C-type asteroid, indicating a primitive carbonaceous composition. Nemesis is about 163 km in diameter and is around the 56th-largest main-belt asteroid. The 38.93‑hour rotation period is the second longest for an asteroid more than 150 km in diameter.

Between 2005 and 2021, Nemesis has been observed to occult eight stars.
