= 175 Andromache =

Main-belt asteroid

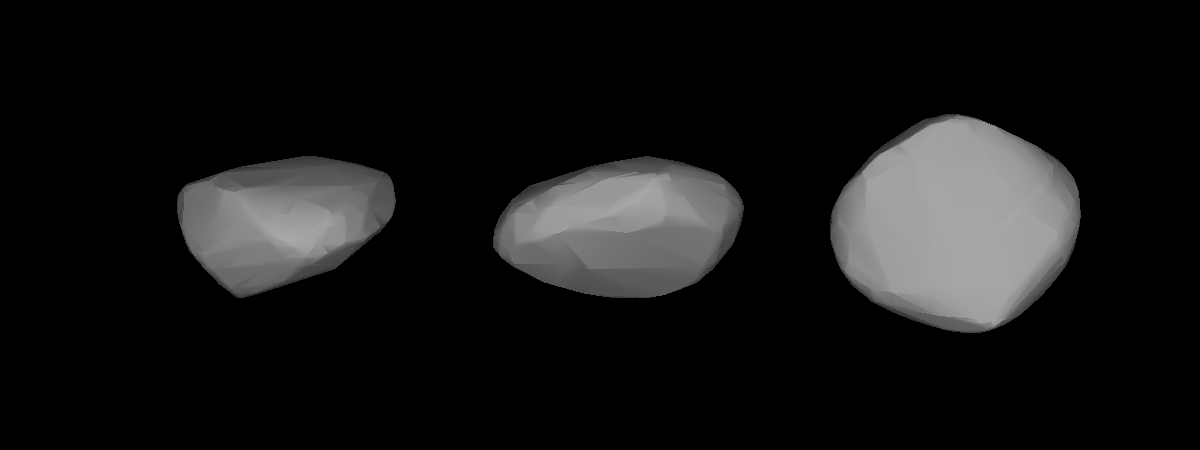
- Lightcurve-based 3D model of 175 Andromache

Discovery
- Discovered by: J. C. Watson
- Discovery date: 1 October 1877

Designations
- Pronunciation: /ænˈdrɒməkiː/
- Named after: Andromache
- Alternative designations: A877 TA; 1893 KA; 1895 XB; 1946 MB; 1946 OD
- Minor planet category: Main belt

Orbital characteristics
- Epoch 31 July 2016 (JD 2457600.5)
- Uncertainty parameter 0
- Observation arc: 138.18 yr (50472 d)
- Aphelion: 3.9264 AU (587.38 Gm)
- Perihelion: 2.4442 AU (365.65 Gm)
- Semi-major axis: 3.1853 AU (476.51 Gm)
- Eccentricity: 0.23267
- Orbital period (sidereal): 5.69 yr (2076.5 d)
- Mean anomaly: 35.697°
- Mean motion: 0° 10^{m} 24.132^{s} / day
- Inclination: 3.2184°
- Longitude of ascending node: 21.353°
- Argument of perihelion: 320.41°
- Earth MOID: 1.43641 AU (214.884 Gm)
- Jupiter MOID: 1.4787 AU (221.21 Gm)
- T_{Jupiter}: 3.153

Physical characteristics
- Mean radius: 50.585±3.5 km
- Mass: (1.9±1.9)×10^{18} kg (Note: Calculated from its standard gravitational parameter GM = 0.13±0.13 km^{3}/s^{2}.) (SB441)
- Mean density: 3.6±3.7 g/cm^{3} (calculated)
- Synodic rotation period: 8.324 h (0.3468 d)
- Geometric albedo: 0.0819±0.013
- Spectral type: C
- Absolute magnitude (H): 8.06; 8.31

175 Andromache is a main-belt asteroid that was discovered by Canadian-American astronomer J. C. Watson on October 1, 1877. It was named after Andromache, wife of Hector during the Trojan War. Watson's telegram to Europe announcing the discovery became lost, and so notification did not arrive until several weeks later. As a result, another minor planet, later designated 176 Iduna, was initially assigned the number 175.

The initial orbital elements for 175 Andromache proved unreliable, and it was only in 1893 that an accurate ephemeris was produced. Because the orbital period is fairly close to being half that of the giant planet Jupiter, 175 Andromache initially became of interest in the study of gravitational perturbations. This object is orbiting the Sun at a distance of 3.19 AU with an eccentricity of 0.23 and an orbital period of 5.69 years. The orbital plane is inclined at an angle of 3.2° to the plane of the ecliptic.

Based upon its spectrum, this is classified as a C-type asteroid. It has a diameter estimated in the range 101–107 km with a roughly circular shape. The size ratio between the major and minor axes is 1.09 ± 0.09, as determined from the W. M. Keck Observatory. An earlier result published in 2000 gave a larger size ratio of 1.20. The asteroid is rotating on its axis with a period of 8.324 hours.
