= Herse (moon) =

Natural satellite of Jupiter

Discovery
- Discovered by: Brett J. Gladman; JJ Kavelaars; Jean-Marc Petit; Lynne Allen
- Discovery date: 2003

Designations
- Designation: Jupiter L
- Pronunciation: /ˈhɜːrsiː/
- Named after: Ἕρση Hersē
- Alternative names: S/2003 J 17
- Adjectives: Hersean /hɜːrˈsiːən/

Orbital characteristics
- Observation arc: 22 years 2025-12-21 (last obs)
- Semi-major axis: 23097000 km
- Eccentricity: 0.200
- Orbital period (sidereal): −715.4 days
- Mean anomaly: 41.90°
- Inclination: 164.2°
- Longitude of ascending node: 329.0°
- Argument of perihelion: 355.7°
- Satellite of: Jupiter
- Group: Carme group

Physical characteristics
- Mean diameter: 2 km
- Apparent magnitude: 23.4
- Absolute magnitude (H): 16.37 (45 obs)

Herse /ˈhɜːrsiː/, or Jupiter L, previously known by its provisional designation of S/2003 J 17, is a natural satellite of Jupiter. It was discovered on 8 February 2003 by the astronomers Brett J. Gladman, JJ Kavelaars, Jean-Marc Petit, and Lynne Allen and also by a team of astronomers at the University of Hawaii. It was named after Herse 'dew', by some accounts a daughter of Zeus and Selene the moon in Greek mythology, on 11 November 2009. Ersa (Jupiter LXXI) is also named for the same mythological figure.

Herse is about 2 kilometres in diameter, and orbits Jupiter at an average distance of 22,134,000 km in 672.752 days, at a mean inclination of 165° to the ecliptic, in a retrograde direction and with a mean eccentricity of 0.2493.

It is a member of the Carme group, made up of irregular retrograde moons orbiting Jupiter at a distance ranging between 23 and 24 million km and at an inclination of about 165°.
