= 121 Hermione =

Main-belt asteroid binary

Discovery
- Discovered by: James Craig Watson
- Discovery date: 12 May 1872

Designations
- Pronunciation: /hɜːrˈmaɪ.əniː/
- Named after: Hermione (Greek mythology)
- Alternative designations: A872 JA; 1970 VE
- Minor planet category: main-belt · Cybele
- Adjectives: Hermionean /hɜːrmaɪ.əˈniːən/

Orbital characteristics
- Epoch 23 March 2018 (JD 2458200.5)
- Uncertainty parameter 0
- Observation arc: 145.96 yr (53,312 d)
- Aphelion: 3.9067 AU
- Perihelion: 2.9889 AU
- Semi-major axis: 3.4478 AU
- Eccentricity: 0.1331
- Orbital period (sidereal): 6.40 yr (2,338 d)
- Mean anomaly: 157.08°
- Mean motion: 0° 9^{m} 14.4^{s} / day
- Inclination: 7.5975°
- Longitude of ascending node: 73.127°
- Argument of perihelion: 298.18°
- Known satellites: S/2002 (121) 1

Physical characteristics
- Dimensions: 268.2 × 186.2 × 182.6 km
- Mean diameter: 196 ± 15 km
- Volume: (3.0±0.4)×10^{6} km^{3} (Note: Using the "snowman" shape model, which best matches the value of J2 implied from precession.)
- Mass: (4.97±0.33)×10^{18} kg (composite estimate)
- Mean density: 1.26 ± 0.30 g/cm^{3}
- Equatorial surface gravity: 0.022 m/s^{2} (Note: On the extremities of the long axis.)
- Equatorial escape velocity: 0.075 km/s
- Synodic rotation period: 5.550877 h
- Pole ecliptic longitude: 362° ± 2°
- Pole ecliptic latitude: 13° ± 1°
- Geometric albedo: 0.0482 ± 0.002
- Spectral type: C
- Absolute magnitude (H): 7.31

121 Hermione is a very large binary asteroid discovered in 1872. It orbits in the Cybele group in the far outer asteroid belt. As an asteroid of the dark C spectral type, it is probably composed of carbonaceous materials. In 2002, a small moon was found to be orbiting Hermione.

== Discovery ==
Hermione was discovered by J. C. Watson on 12 May 1872 from Ann Arbor, Michigan, in the United States, and named after Hermione, daughter of Menelaus and Helen in Greek mythology.

== Physical properties ==
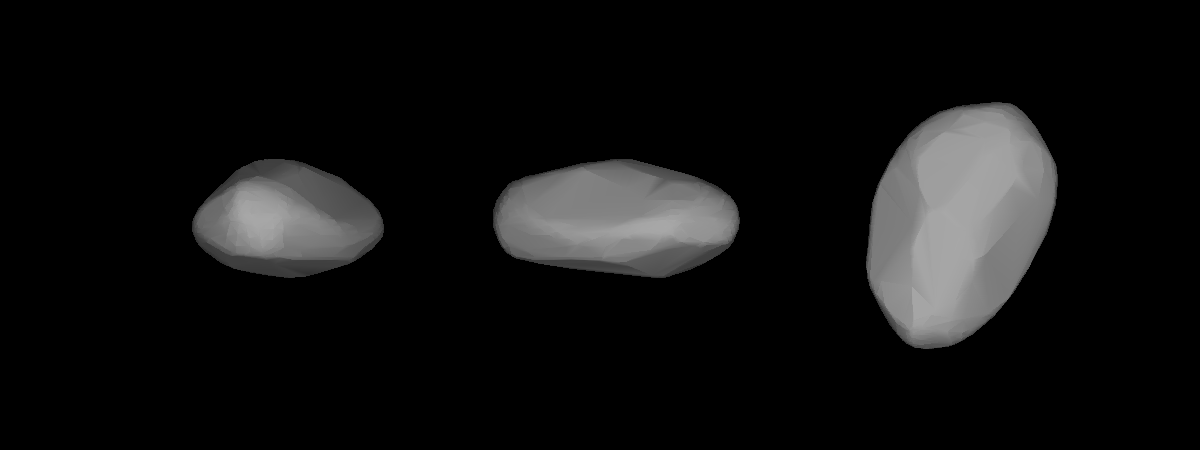
Lightcurve-based 3D-model of Hermione

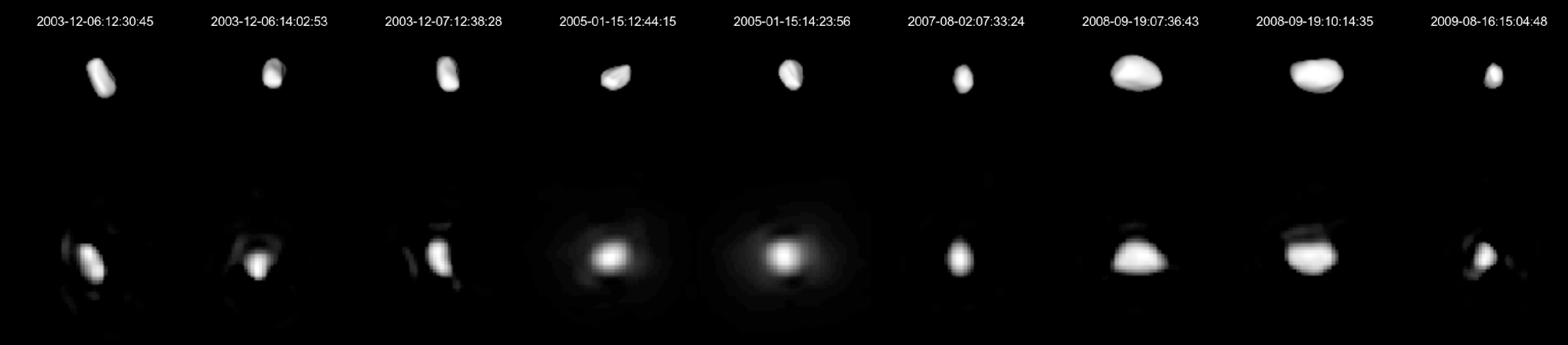
Lightcurve-based 3D-model of Hermione on the top and an image of the asteroid on the bottom.

The asteroid has a bi-lobed shape, as evidenced by adaptive optics images, the first of which were taken in December 2003 with the Keck telescope. Of several proposed shape models that agreed with the images, a "snowman"-like shape was found to best fit the observed precession rate of Hermione's satellite. In this "snowman" model, the asteroid's shape can be approximated by two partially overlapping spheres of radii 80 and 60 km, whose centers are separated by a distance of 115 km. A simple ellipsoid shape was ruled out.

Observation of the satellite's orbit has made possible an accurate determination of Hermione's mass. For the best-fit "snowman" model, the density is found to be 1.8 ± 0.2 g/cm^{3}, giving a porosity on the order of 20%, and possibly indicating that the main components are fractured solid bodies, rather than the asteroid being a rubble pile.

Occultations by Hermione have been successfully observed three times so far, the last time in February 2004.

S/2002 (121) 1
Discovery
- Discovered by: W. J. Merline, P. M. Tamblyn, C. Dumas, L. M. Close, C. R. Chapman, F. Menard, W. M. Owen, and D. C. Slater
- Discovery date: 2002-09-28

Designations
- Alternative designations: LaFayette
- Minor planet category: main-belt · Cybele

Orbital characteristics
- Semi-major axis: 768 ± 11 km
- Eccentricity: 0.001 ± 0.001
- Orbital period (sidereal): 2.582 ± 0.002 d
- Inclination: 3 ± 2° (with respect to Hermione pole)
- Satellite of: 121 Hermione

Physical characteristics
- Dimensions: 12 ± 4 km
- Mass: ~1.6×10^{15} kg (Note: Assuming a similar density to the primary.)
- Absolute magnitude (H): 13.0

== Moon ==
A satellite of Hermione was discovered in 2002 with the Keck II telescope. It is about 8 miles (13 km) in diameter. The satellite is provisionally designated S/2002 (121) 1. It has not yet been officially named, but "LaFayette" has been proposed by a group of astronomers in reference to the frigate used in secret by Marquis de Lafayette to reach America to help the insurgents.
