= James Craig Watson =

Canadian-American astronomer

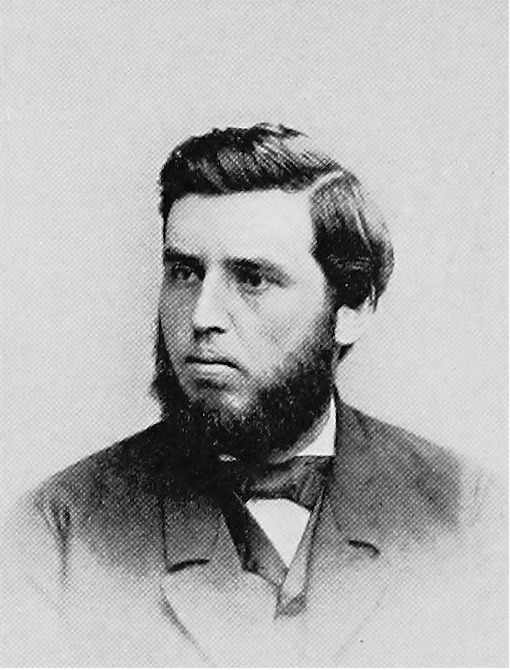
- Portrait of Watson
- Born: January 28, 1838; Fingal, Upper Canada
- Died: November 23, 1880 (aged 42); Madison, Wisconsin, US
- Education: University of Michigan
- Occupations: professor, physicist, astronomer
- Known for: Discovery of comets and asteroids
- Awards: Lalande Prize

James Craig Watson (January 28, 1838 – November 23, 1880) was a Canadian-American astronomer, discoverer of comets and minor planets, director of the University of Michigan's Detroit Observatory in Ann Arbor, and awarded with the Lalande Prize in 1869.

== Biography ==
Watson was born in the village of Fingal, Ontario. His family relocated to Ann Arbor, Michigan in 1850. At age 15 he was matriculated at the University of Michigan, where he studied the classical languages. He graduated with a BA in 1857 and received a master's degree on examination after two years' study in astronomy under professor Franz Brünnow. He became Professor of Physics and instructor in Mathematics, and in 1863, succeeded him as professor of Astronomy and director of the Detroit Observatory. He wrote the textbook Theoretical Astronomy, published in 1868 by J. B. Lippincott & Co. The textbook was a standard reference work for over thirty years.

He discovered 22 asteroids, beginning with 79 Eurynome in 1863. One of his asteroid discoveries, 139 Juewa was made in Beijing when Watson was there to observe the 1874 transit of Venus. The name Juewa was chosen by Chinese officials (瑞華, or in modern pinyin, ruìhuá). Another was 121 Hermione in 1872, from Ann Arbor, Michigan, and this asteroid was found to have a small asteroid moon in 2002.

He was a member of the most important expeditions for astronomical observation sent out by the United States Government during his time. The first was an expedition to observe the eclipse of the Sun at Mount Pleasant, Iowa, in 1869; the second of a similar expedition to Sicily, in 1870; the third to Beijing, China, to observe the transit of Venus in 1874; the fourth to Wyoming, to observe the total eclipse of the sun in 1878. He was a strong believer in the existence of the planet Vulcan, a hypothetical planet closer to the Sun than Mercury, which is now known not to exist (however the existence of small Vulcanoid planetoids remains a possibility). He believed he had seen such two such planets during his observation of the 1878 solar eclipse.

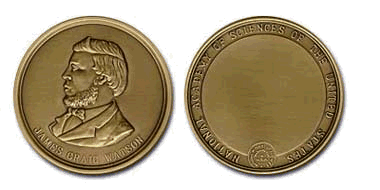
The James Craig Watson Medal

In 1879, after attempts by the university to retain him, Watson resigned his professorship at Ann Arbor to accept a position the University of Wisconsin, where he hoped to find superior apparatus and instruments for the difficult observations which he had planned. Seeking to silence critics who doubted his claims to have discovered Vulcan, he also personally paid to construct an underground observatory, in a misguided attempt to observe planets in the daytime. This was based on the idea that stars could be seen during the day from the bottom of a well, which is an ancient myth but verifiably incorrect. (It is not merely direct glare from the Sun that hides the stars, but scattered light from the atmosphere above the well.)

Watson died of peritonitis at the age of 42 and was buried at Forest Hill, Ann Arbor. He had amassed a considerable fortune through non-astronomical business activities and, by bequest, established the James Craig Watson Medal, awarded every two years by the National Academy of Sciences for contributions to astronomy. His successor, Edward Holden, completed Watson's underground observatory, but declared it useless after he found not even the brightest stars could be observed.

Asteroids discovered: 22
79 Eurynome	September 14, 1863
93 Minerva	August 24, 1867
94 Aurora	September 6, 1867
100 Hekate	July 11, 1868
101 Helena	August 15, 1868
103 Hera	September 7, 1868
104 Klymene	September 13, 1868
105 Artemis	September 16, 1868
106 Dione	October 10, 1868
115 Thyra	August 6, 1871
119 Althaea	April 3, 1872
121 Hermione	May 12, 1872
128 Nemesis	November 25, 1872
132 Aethra	June 13, 1873
133 Cyrene	August 16, 1873
139 Juewa	October 10, 1874
150 Nuwa	October 18, 1875
161 Athor	April 19, 1876
168 Sibylla	September 28, 1876
174 Phaedra	September 2, 1877
175 Andromache	October 1, 1877
179 Klytaemnestra	November 11, 1877

== Personality ==
Watson often prioritized financial gain. This obsession, in the view of the University of Michigan's first president, Henry Philip Tappan, led Watson to do nothing while serving as director of the Detroit Observatory during Brünnow's brief absence from 1859 to 1860. Brünnow had gone to the Dudley Observatory as Associate Director in Albany, New York, but he was called back to direct the Detroit Observatory by the Regents. The return of Brünnow so infuriated Watson that Watson contacted local life insurance agencies in Ann Arbor and became a life insurance actuary, where he made some extra money. Watson also during his career helped reduce Washington Zones for the United States Office of Coast Survey solely for the money. In another action motivated by money, Watson built a house in Ann Arbor on South University Avenue for $5000 but still could not pay for it after gathering all his resources and borrowing $2000. He requested a mortgage soon after with the house as collateral, then he sold the house to someone in Saline in September 1862 and then convinced the Regents to build a Director’s Residence attached to Detroit Observatory. It is unclear how he had such massive debt despite his rather large salary at the time.

Watson was a very divisive person on the University of Michigan’s campus. He did not allow visitors or students in the Detroit Observatory, angering many students. He also only really cared about students interested in astronomy, but he was an interesting lecturer and easy grader, so a large number of students took his courses. His carelessness is reflected in the fact that he once gave passing grades to an entire class, including to a student who died two weeks into the term.

Watson also appeared to be rather vain. He would sign his notebooks as if practicing his autograph, including once signing his notebook, “James Craig Watson, Astronomer Royal,” a title only given to the most renowned astronomers of Britain. Watson also once wrote this about himself:

The Hon. James C. Watson, one of the greatest astronomers that this country has ever produced to whom immeasured devotion to science owes some of its greatest blessings. Astronomy under his patronage has reached a summit rarely attained. The telescope which the Hon. James C. Watson, LL.D., F.R.S., F.A.S., &c &c &c proposes to make is of the Gregorian construction and will bear a magnifying power of 1200 Times! Great indeed!!! 1200! 1200!

In addition to this, Watson frequently committed plagiarism, including from Brünnow, and he received a variety of honorary degrees by asking for them rather than being honored with them (e.g. Doctor from University of Leipzig, Doctor of Law from Columbia College, etc.). Oddly, Watson was still well-liked for being cheerful and humorous. Watson also was a religious fundamentalist, believing that mathematicians could not be atheists.

== Honors and awards ==
Watson won the Lalande Prize given by the French Academy of Sciences for 1869. He was a member of the National Academy of Sciences and the American Philosophical Society. He received the honorary degree of Doctor of Philosophy from the University of Leipzig in 1870, and from Yale College in 1871, and the degree of Doctor of Laws from Columbia in 1877.

The main-belt asteroid 729 Watsonia is named in his honour, as is the lunar crater Watson.
