= 119 Althaea =

Main-belt asteroid

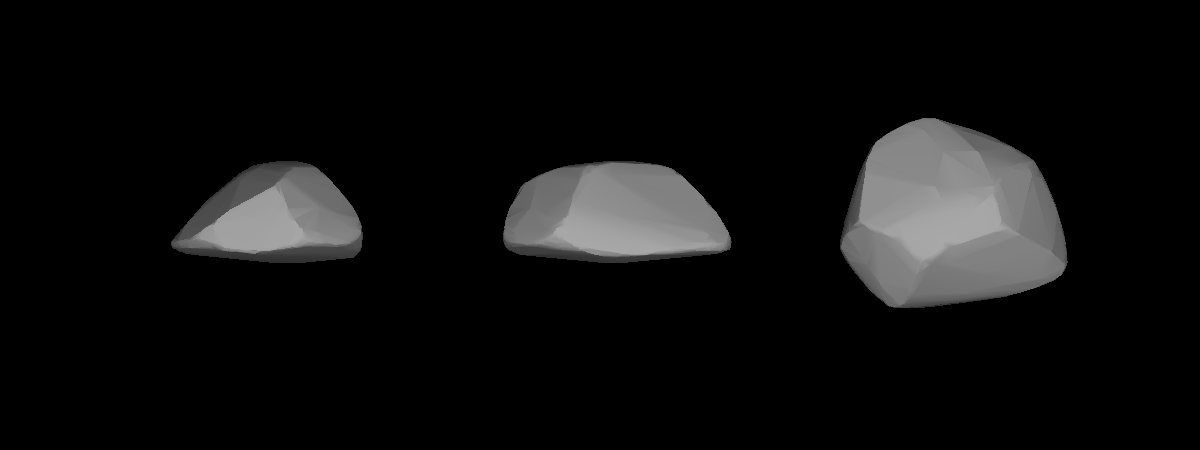
- A three-dimensional model of 119 Althaea based on its lightcurve

Discovery
- Discovered by: James Craig Watson
- Discovery date: 3 April 1872

Designations
- Pronunciation: /ælˈθiːə/
- Named after: Althaea
- Alternative designations: A872 GA; 1972 KO
- Minor planet category: Main belt

Orbital characteristics
- Epoch 31 July 2016 (JD 2457600.5)
- Uncertainty parameter 0
- Observation arc: 143.99 yr (52593 d)
- Aphelion: 2.7896 AU (417.32 Gm)
- Perihelion: 2.37335 AU (355.048 Gm)
- Semi-major axis: 2.58147 AU (386.182 Gm)
- Eccentricity: 0.080623
- Orbital period (sidereal): 4.15 yr (1515.0 d)
- Average orbital speed: 18.51 km/s
- Mean anomaly: 114.868°
- Mean motion: 0° 14^{m} 15.472^{s} / day
- Inclination: 5.7831°
- Longitude of ascending node: 203.674°
- Argument of perihelion: 170.021°
- Earth MOID: 1.37297 AU (205.393 Gm)
- Jupiter MOID: 2.58409 AU (386.574 Gm)
- T_{Jupiter}: 3.413

Physical characteristics
- Dimensions: 57.30±1.1 km
- Mass: 2.0×10^{17} kg
- Equatorial surface gravity: 0.0160 m/s^{2}
- Equatorial escape velocity: 0.0303 km/s
- Synodic rotation period: 11.484 h (0.4785 d)
- Geometric albedo: 0.2306±0.010
- Temperature: ~173 K
- Spectral type: S
- Absolute magnitude (H): 8.42

119 Althaea is a main-belt asteroid that was discovered by Canadian-American astronomer J. C. Watson on April 3, 1872, and named after Althaea, the mother of Meleager in Greek mythology. Two occultations by Althaea were observed in 2002, only a month apart.

This object is orbiting the Sun at a distance of 2.58 AU with an eccentricity of 0.08, bringing it as close as 2.37 AU and taking it as far as 2.79 AU over the course of its 4.15 year orbital period. The orbital plane is inclined at an angle of 5.78° relative to the plane of the ecliptic.

Based upon its spectrum, this is classified as an S-type asteroid. Using infrared measurements, its diameter was measured as around 57 km. Photometric observations made in 1988 at the Félix Aguilar Observatory produced a light curve with a period of 11.484±0.010 hours with a brightness variation of 0.365±0.010 in magnitude.
