= Ersa (moon) =

Outer moon of Jupiter

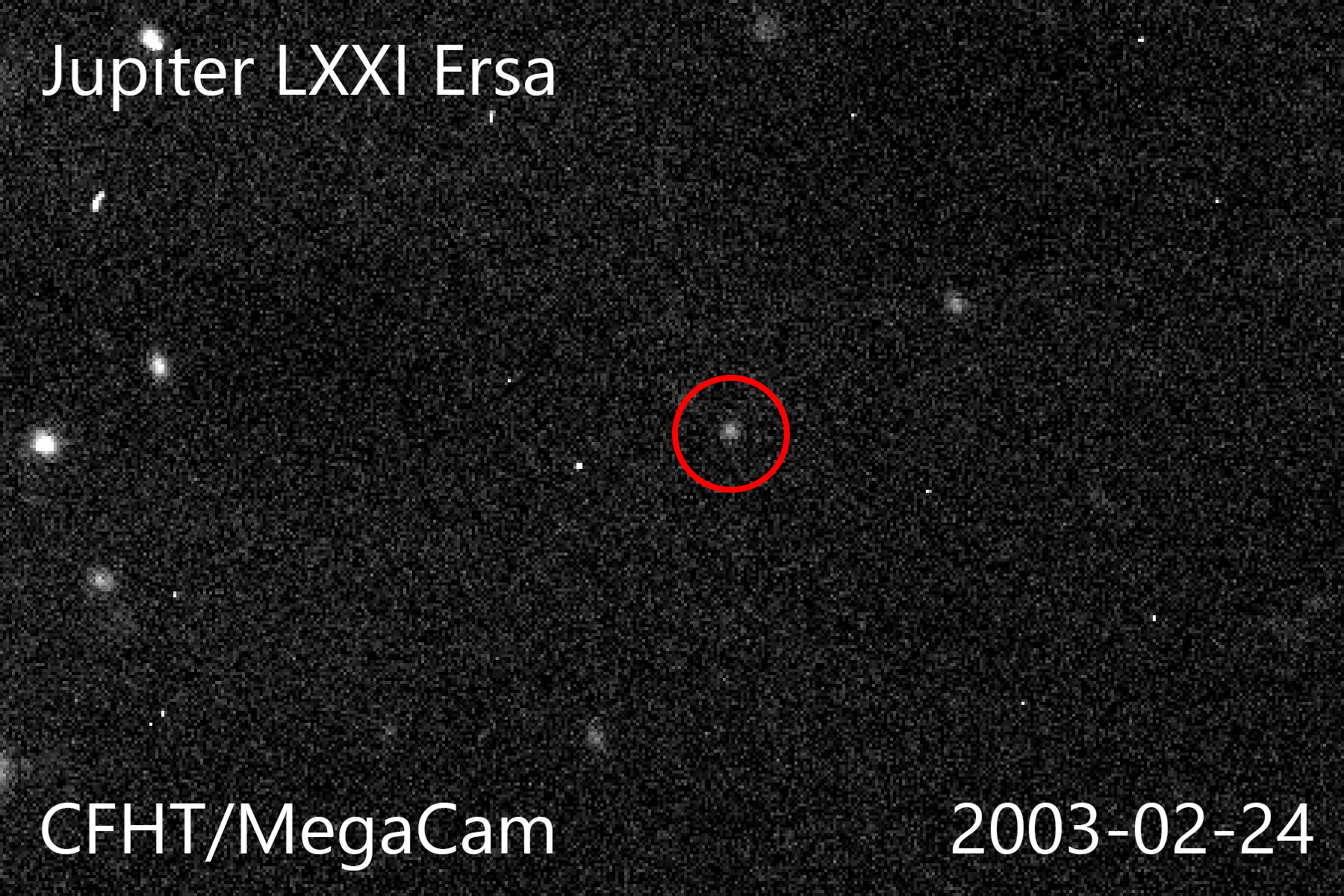
- Precovery image of Ersa taken by the Canada-France-Hawaii Telescope in February 2003

Discovery
- Discovered by: Scott S. Sheppard
- Discovery site: Cerro Tololo Obs.
- Discovery date: 11 May 2018

Designations
- Designation: Jupiter LXXI
- Pronunciation: /ˈɜːrsə/
- Named after: Ἔρσα Ersa
- Alternative names: S/2018 J 1

Orbital characteristics
- Epoch 1 January 2000 (JD 2451545.0)
- Observation arc: 24 years 2024-12-03 (last obs)
- Earliest precovery date: 6 August 2000
- Satellite of: Jupiter
- Group: Himalia group

Proper orbital elements
- Proper semi-major axis: 11,401,000 km (0.07621 AU) AU
- Proper eccentricity: 0.116
- Proper inclination: 29.1° (to ecliptic)
- Proper mean motion: 527.587231 deg / yr
- Proper orbital period: 0.68235 yr (249.229 d)
- Precession of perihelion: 8994.503 arcsec / yr
- Precession of the ascending node: 4232.058 arcsec / yr

Physical characteristics
- Mean diameter: ≈3 km
- Albedo: 0.04 (assumed)
- Apparent magnitude: 22.9
- Absolute magnitude (H): 15.98 (65 obs)

Ersa /ˈɜːrsə/, also designated Jupiter LXXI, is a small outer natural satellite of Jupiter discovered by Scott S. Sheppard on 11 May 2018, using the 4.0-meter Víctor M. Blanco Telescope at Cerro Tololo Observatory, Chile. It was announced alongside nine other Jovian moons on 17 July 2018 and was provisionally designated S/2018 J 1 by the Minor Planet Center, after observations were collected over a long enough time span to confirm the satellite's orbit. The satellite has been found in precovery observations as early as 6 August 2000.

Ersa is part of the Himalia group, a tight cluster of prograde irregular moons of Jupiter that follow similar orbits to Himalia at semi-major axes between 11–12 million km (6.8–7.5 million mi) and inclinations between 26–31°. With an estimated diameter of 3 km (1.9 mi) for an absolute magnitude of 15.9, it is one of the smallest known members of the Himalia group.

== Name ==
Animation of Ersa precovery images by the CFHT on 24 February 2003

The moon was named in 2019 after Ersa, the Greek goddess of dew, daughter of Zeus and Selene: Herse (Jupiter L) is also named for this goddess. The name was suggested in a naming contest held by the Carnegie Institute on Twitter, where more than twenty tweets suggested the name, including Aaron Quah (@8603103) who submitted the name first, StSauveur_MoonsProject (@StSauMoons) that are the 12th grade students of Saint Sauveur High School in Redon, France, the fifth grade at Hillside Traditional Academy in British Columbia, Canada (submitted on their behalf by @mrgrouchypants), and a 4-year-old child who sang a song about Ersa (submitted on his behalf by @Thoreson).

It belongs to the prograde Himalia group which are given names ending in a.

== Orbit ==
On average, Ersa orbits Jupiter at a semi-major axis of about 11,401,000 km (7,084,000 mi) at an inclination of about 29.1° with respect to the ecliptic. Like all of Jupiter's irregular moons, Ersa orbits far enough away that it is highly subject to gravitational perturbations by the Sun and other planets, which makes its orbit highly variable over time.
