= 168 Sibylla =

Outer main-belt asteroid

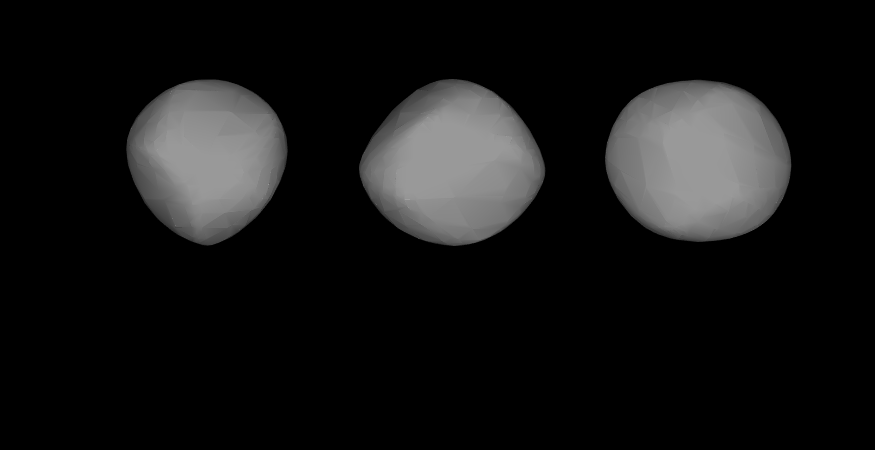
- Lightcurve-based 3D model of 168 Sibylla

Discovery
- Discovered by: J. C. Watson
- Discovery site: Ann Arbor
- Discovery date: 28 September 1876

Designations
- Pronunciation: /sɪˈbɪlə/
- Named after: Sibyls
- Alternative designations: A876 SA; 1911 HF; 1949 MO
- Minor planet category: main-belt
- Adjectives: Sibyllian /sɪˈbɪliən/

Orbital characteristics
- Epoch 31 July 2016 (JD 2457600.5)
- Uncertainty parameter 0
- Observation arc: 136.01 yr (49676 d)
- Aphelion: 3.6215 AU (541.77 Gm)
- Perihelion: 3.1417 AU (469.99 Gm)
- Semi-major axis: 3.3816 AU (505.88 Gm)
- Eccentricity: 0.070943
- Orbital period (sidereal): 6.22 yr (2271.4 d)
- Average orbital speed: 16.19 km/s
- Mean anomaly: 171.517°
- Mean motion: 0° 9^{m} 30.564^{s} / day
- Inclination: 4.6617°
- Longitude of ascending node: 205.959°
- Argument of perihelion: 173.920°

Physical characteristics
- Mean diameter: 148.97±4.51 km (composite estimate); 148.39±4.0 km
- Mass: (5.75 ± 1.68) × 10^{18} kg (composite estimate) (3.19±0.37)×10^{18} kg (Note: Calculated from its standard gravitational parameter GM = 0.213±0.025 km^{3}/s^{2}.)
- Mean density: 3.32 ± 1.01 g/cm^{3} 1.99 g/cm^{3} (Note: Assuming a diameter of 145 km.)
- Synodic rotation period: 47.009 h (1.9587 d)
- Sidereal rotation period: 23.82 hours
- Geometric albedo: 0.0535±0.003
- Spectral type: C
- Absolute magnitude (H): 7.94

168 Sibylla is a large main-belt asteroid, discovered by Canadian-American astronomer J. C. Watson on September 28, 1876. It was most likely named for the Sibyls, referring to the Ancient Greek female oracles. Based upon its spectrum this object is classified as a C-type asteroid, which indicates it is very dark and composed of primitive carbonaceous materials. 168 Sibylla is a Cybele asteroid, orbiting beyond most of the main-belt asteroids.

Photometric observations of this asteroid made at the Torino Observatory in Italy during 1990–1991 were used to determine a synodic rotation period of 23.82 ± 0.004 hours. The shape of this slowly rotating object appears to resemble an oblate spheroid.
