= 174 Phaedra =

Main-belt asteroid

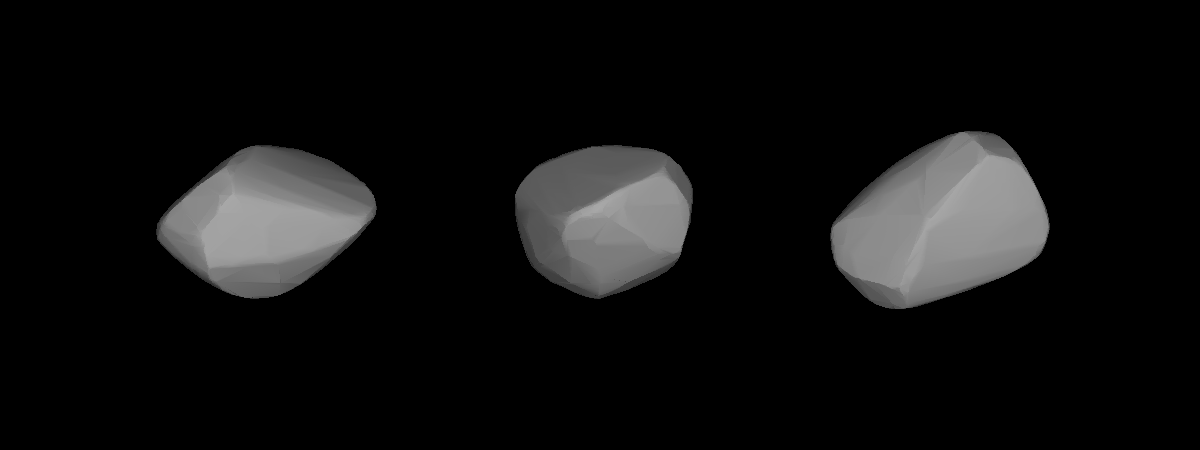
- A three-dimensional model of 174 Phaedra based on its lightcurve

Discovery
- Discovered by: J. C. Watson
- Discovery date: 2 September 1877

Designations
- Pronunciation: /ˈfiːdrə/
- Alternative designations: A877 RA
- Minor planet category: Main belt

Orbital characteristics
- Epoch 31 July 2016 (JD 2457600.5)
- Uncertainty parameter 0
- Observation arc: 138.61 yr (50629 d)
- Aphelion: 3.2658 AU (488.56 Gm)
- Perihelion: 2.4572 AU (367.59 Gm)
- Semi-major axis: 2.8615 AU (428.07 Gm)
- Eccentricity: 0.14128
- Orbital period (sidereal): 4.84 yr (1768.0 d)
- Mean anomaly: 330.70°
- Mean motion: 0° 12^{m} 13.032^{s} / day
- Inclination: 12.124°
- Longitude of ascending node: 327.69°
- Argument of perihelion: 289.08°
- Earth MOID: 1.47439 AU (220.566 Gm)
- Jupiter MOID: 1.99981 AU (299.167 Gm)
- T_{Jupiter}: 3.254

Physical characteristics
- Mean radius: 34.62±2.2 km
- Synodic rotation period: 5.744 h (0.2393 d)
- Geometric albedo: 0.1495±0.021
- Spectral type: S
- Absolute magnitude (H): 8.48

174 Phaedra is a sizable, rocky main belt asteroid that was discovered by Canadian-American astronomer James Craig Watson on September 2, 1877, and named after Phaedra, the tragic lovelorn queen in Greek mythology.

The asteroid is orbiting the Sun with a period of 4.84 years and an eccentricity of 0.14. Lightcurve data obtained from Phaedra indicates a rather irregular or elongated body. It has a cross-section size of ~35 km. Photometric observations of this asteroid at the Shadowbox Observatory in Carmel, Indiana, during 2009 gave a light curve with a period of 4.96 ± 0.01 hours. This is consistent with previous studies in 1977, 1988, and 2008. The asteroid's pole of rotation lies just 5–16° away from the plane of the ecliptic.
