= 115 Thyra =

Main-belt asteroid

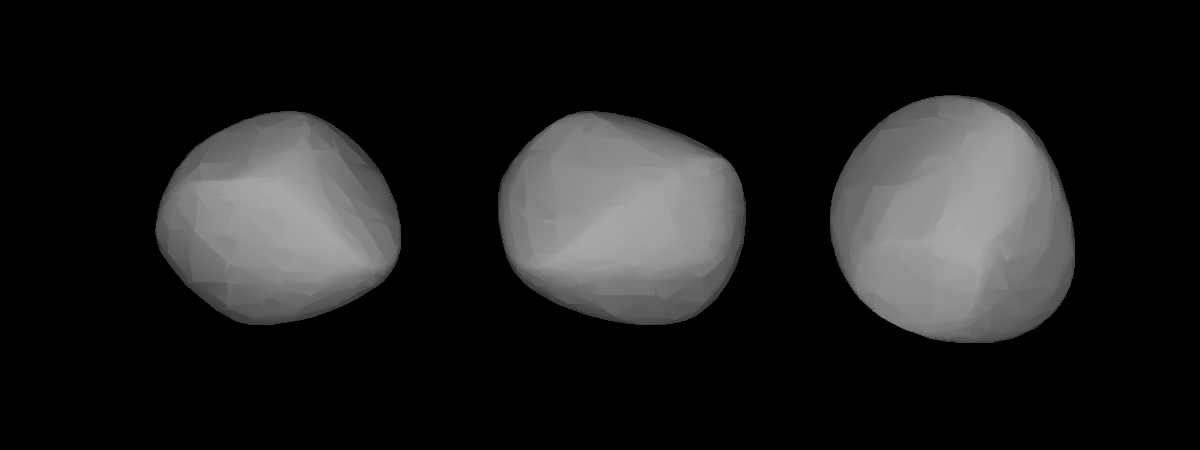
- A three-dimensional model of 115 Thyra based on its lightcurve

Discovery
- Discovered by: James Craig Watson
- Discovery date: 6 August 1871

Designations
- Pronunciation: /ˈθaɪərə/
- Named after: Thyra
- Alternative designations: A871 PA
- Minor planet category: Main belt

Orbital characteristics
- Epoch 31 July 2016 (JD 2457600.5)
- Uncertainty parameter 0
- Observation arc: 143.31 yr (52344 d)
- Aphelion: 2.8376 AU (424.50 Gm)
- Perihelion: 1.92394 AU (287.817 Gm)
- Semi-major axis: 2.38077 AU (356.158 Gm)
- Eccentricity: 0.19188
- Orbital period (sidereal): 3.67 yr (1341.8 d)
- Average orbital speed: 19.13 km/s
- Mean anomaly: 108.401°
- Mean motion: 0° 16^{m} 5.88^{s} / day
- Inclination: 11.595°
- Longitude of ascending node: 308.901°
- Argument of perihelion: 96.946°
- Earth MOID: 0.97246 AU (145.478 Gm)
- Jupiter MOID: 2.63437 AU (394.096 Gm)
- T_{Jupiter}: 3.486

Physical characteristics
- Dimensions: 79.83±1.4 km 79.83 km
- Mass: (7.19±0.60)×10^{17} kg (Note: Calculated from its standard gravitational parameter GM = 0.048±0.004 km^{3}/s^{2}.)
- Mean density: 2.73 g/cm^{3}
- Equatorial surface gravity: 0.0223 m/s^{2}
- Equatorial escape velocity: 0.0422 km/s
- Synodic rotation period: 7.241 h (0.3017 d)
- Geometric albedo: 0.2747±0.010; 0.275
- Temperature: ~180 K
- Spectral type: S
- Absolute magnitude (H): 7.51

115 Thyra is a fairly large and bright inner main-belt asteroid that was discovered by Canadian-American astronomer J. C. Watson on August 6, 1871 and was named for Thyra, the consort of King Gorm the Old of Denmark. Based upon its spectrum, it is categorized as a stony S-type asteroid.

Observations made between 1978 and 1981 produced a composite light curve with two minima and maxima. However, a subsequent study in 1983 only found a single minima and maxima. A synodical rotation period of 7.241 hours was determined. This was confirmed by observations between 1995 and 2000. The changes in brightness and color indicate a surface with an uneven composition.

The asteroid has a slightly elongated shape, with a ratio of 1.20 between the lengths of the major and minor axes. The orbital longitude and latitude of the asteroid pole in degrees is estimated to be (λ_{0}, β_{0}) = (68°, 23°). Measurements of the thermal inertia of 115 Thyra give a value of around 75 m^{−2} K^{−1} s^{−1/2}, compared to 50 for lunar regolith and 400 for coarse sand in an atmosphere.
