= 179 Klytaemnestra =

Main-belt asteroid

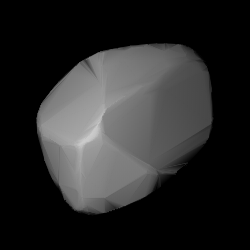
- 3D convex shape model of 179 Klytaemnestra

Discovery
- Discovered by: J. C. Watson
- Discovery site: Ann Arbor Obs.
- Discovery date: 11 November 1877

Designations
- Pronunciation: /klɪtɪmˈnɛstrə/
- Named after: Clytemnestra (Greek mythology)
- Alternative designations: A877 VC
- Minor planet category: main-belt · (outer); Telramund

Orbital characteristics
- Epoch 23 March 2018 (JD 2458200.5)
- Uncertainty parameter 0
- Observation arc: 119.12 yr (43,507 d)
- Aphelion: 3.3085 AU
- Perihelion: 2.6356 AU
- Semi-major axis: 2.9720 AU
- Eccentricity: 0.1132
- Orbital period (sidereal): 5.12 yr (1,871 d)
- Mean anomaly: 194.50°
- Mean motion: 0° 11^{m} 32.64^{s} / day
- Inclination: 7.8163°
- Longitude of ascending node: 251.91°
- Argument of perihelion: 103.64°

Physical characteristics
- Mean diameter: 64.25±0.79 km 69.946±0.518 km 72.786±0.799 km 75.02±3.21 km 77.69±1.4 km 90.17±1.53 km
- Mass: (2.49±1.19)×10^{17} kg
- Mean density: 1.12±0.55 g/cm^{3}
- Synodic rotation period: 11.13±0.02 h 11.173 h 11.17342±0.00005 h
- Geometric albedo: 0.119±0.018; 0.1609±0.006; 0.1833±0.0578; 0.198±0.011; 0.245±0.007
- Spectral type: Tholen = S SMASS = Sk; B–V = 0.832; U–B = 0.408
- Absolute magnitude (H): 8.15; 8.22

179 Klytaemnestra is a stony Telramund asteroid from the outer regions of the asteroid belt, approximately 77 kilometers (48 miles) in diameter. It was discovered on 11 November 1877, by Canadian-American astronomer James Craig Watson at the old Ann Arbor Observatory in Michigan, United States. It was his last discovery three years before his death. The transitional S-type asteroid has a rotation period of 11.17 hours. It was named after Clytemnestra from Greek mythology.

== Orbit and classification ==
Together with asteroid 9506 Telramund, Klytaemnestra is the largest members of the Telramund family (614), a mid-sized family of stony asteroids in the outer main belt, which is also known as the Klytaemnestra family.

It orbits the Sun in the outer main-belt at a distance of 2.6–3.3 AU once every 5 years and 1 month (1,871 days; semi-major axis of 2.97 AU). Its orbit has an eccentricity of 0.11 and an inclination of 8° with respect to the ecliptic. The body's observation arc begins at Lick Observatory in February 1899, more than 21 years after to its official discovery observation at Ann Arbor.

== Physical characteristics ==
In the Tholen classification, Klytaemnestra is a common stony S-type asteroid, while in the SMASS classification it is a Sk-subtype, that transitions between the S- and K-type asteroids.

=== Rotation period and poles ===
Photometric observations of this asteroid at the Oakley Observatory in Terre Haute, Indiana, during 2006 gave a light curve with a period of 11.13 ± 0.02 hours and a brightness variation of 0.55 ± 0.02 in magnitude (U=2). A better rated lightcurve, already obtained by Alan Harris in October 1979, gave a period of 11.173 hours with an amplitude of 0.35 (U=3).

A modeled lightcurve using photometric data from a larger international collaboration was published in 2016. It gave a period of 11.17342 hours, identical to the 1979-observations by Harris, as well as two spin axes at (65.0°, −6.0°) and (248.0°, −9.0°) in ecliptic coordinates (λ, β).

=== Diameter and albedo ===
According to the surveys carried out by the Infrared Astronomical Satellite IRAS, the Japanese Akari satellite and the NEOWISE mission of NASA's Wide-field Infrared Survey Explorer, Klytaemnestra measures between 64.25 and 90.17 kilometers in diameter and its surface has an albedo between 0.119 and 0.245.

The Collaborative Asteroid Lightcurve Link adopts the results obtained by IRAS, that is, an albedo of 0.1609 and a diameter of 77.69 kilometers based on an absolute magnitude of 8.15.

== Naming ==
This minor planet was named from Greek mythology after Clytemnestra, the daughter of Leda and the Spartan king Tyndareus. She was the wife of Agamemnon and the mother Orestes, Electra, Iphigenia and Chrysothemis. Clytemnestra and her lover Aegisthus murdered Agamemnon on his return from the Trojan War. The minor planets (38), (112), (130), (911), (637) and (8125) were named after these mythological figures.
