= 94 Aurora =

Main-belt asteroid

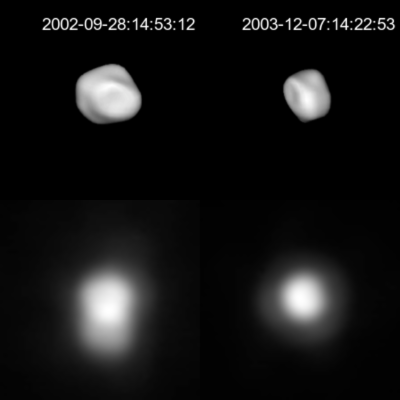
- A three-dimensional model of 94 Aurora based on its light curve on the top with the image of the asteroid on the bottom.

Discovery
- Discovered by: James Craig Watson
- Discovery date: 6 September 1867

Designations
- Pronunciation: /əˈrɔːrə, ɒ-/
- Named after: Aurōra
- Minor planet category: Main belt
- Adjectives: Aurorean /ɔːˈrɔːriən/

Orbital characteristics
- Epoch 9 June 2026 (JD 2461200.5)
- Uncertainty parameter 0
- Observation arc: 153.69 yr (56136 d)
- Aphelion: 3.46636 AU (518.560 Gm)
- Perihelion: 2.85175 AU (426.616 Gm)
- Semi-major axis: 3.15906 AU (472.589 Gm)
- Eccentricity: 0.097277
- Orbital period (sidereal): 5.61493 yr (2050.85 d)
- Average orbital speed: 16.73 km/s
- Mean anomaly: 45.7061°
- Mean motion: 0° 10^{m} 31.908^{s} / day
- Inclination: 7.97093°
- Longitude of ascending node: 2.45293°
- Argument of perihelion: 60.6118°
- Jupiter MOID: 1.87872 AU (281.053 Gm)
- T_{Jupiter}: 3.183

Physical characteristics
- Dimensions: 225 × 173 km
- Mean diameter: 202/196 ± 4 km (AO)
- Mass: (4.96±0.28)×10^{18} kg (2025) (Note: Calculated from its standard gravitational parameter GM = 0.331±0.019 km^{3}/s^{2}.) (3.22±0.91)×10^{18} kg (2023)
- Mean density: 1.26±0.11 g/cm^{3} (2025) (Note: Assuming a diameter of 196 ± 4 km.); 0.82±0.27 g/cm^{3} (2023) (Note: Assuming a diameter of 195.3 ± 10.1 km.)
- Equatorial surface gravity: 0.0345 m/s²
- Equatorial escape velocity: 0.0822 km/s
- Synodic rotation period: 7.22619 h (0.301091 d)
- Pole ecliptic longitude: 244° ± 2°/56° ± 3°
- Pole ecliptic latitude: 3° ± 5°/7° ± 5°
- Geometric albedo: 0.0395±0.001; 0.0395
- Temperature: ~157 K
- Spectral type: C
- Absolute magnitude (H): 7.74

94 Aurora is one of the largest main-belt asteroids. With an albedo of only 0.04, it is darker than soot, and has a primitive composition consisting of carbonaceous material. It was discovered by J. C. Watson on 6 September 1867 in Ann Arbor, and named after Aurora, the Roman goddess of the dawn.

This asteroid is orbiting the Sun with a period of 5.62 years and a relatively low eccentricity of 0.092. It is spinning with a rotation period of 7.22 hours. Observations of an occultation using nine chords indicate an oval outline of 225×173 km. The asteroid's pole of rotation lies just 3–7° away from the plane of the ecliptic.
