= 104 Klymene =

Main-belt asteroid

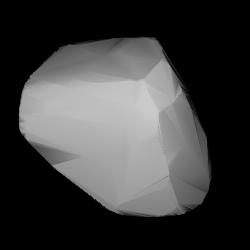
- 3D convex shape model of 104 Klymene

Discovery
- Discovered by: James Craig Watson
- Discovery date: 13 September 1868

Designations
- Pronunciation: /ˈklɪmɪniː/
- Alternative designations: A868 RB, 1893 FA; 1951 OE, 1968 OS
- Minor planet category: Main belt

Orbital characteristics
- Epoch 31 July 2016 (JD 2457600.5)
- Uncertainty parameter 0
- Observation arc: 130.58 yr (47693 d)
- Aphelion: 3.6499 AU (546.02 Gm)
- Perihelion: 2.65525 AU (397.220 Gm)
- Semi-major axis: 3.15256 AU (471.616 Gm)
- Eccentricity: 0.15775
- Orbital period (sidereal): 5.60 yr (2044.5 d)
- Average orbital speed: 16.67 km/s
- Mean anomaly: 101.498°
- Mean motion: 0° 10^{m} 33.888^{s} / day
- Inclination: 2.7905°
- Longitude of ascending node: 41.698°
- Argument of perihelion: 32.134°
- Earth MOID: 1.66901 AU (249.680 Gm)
- Jupiter MOID: 1.63907 AU (245.201 Gm)
- T_{Jupiter}: 3.186

Physical characteristics
- Dimensions: 163 km × 103 km (± 3 km × 5 km)
- Mean diameter: 130.48±5.85 km (composite estimate); 136.553±1.554 km 133 km
- Mass: (1.835 ± 0.880/0.495)×10^{18} kg (1.80±0.22)×10^{18} kg (Note: Calculated from its standard gravitational parameter GM = 0.120±0.015 km^{3}/s^{2}.)
- Mean density: 1.633 ± 0.783/0.441 g/cm^{3} (Note: Assuming a diameter of 128.99 ± 3.8 km.); 1.35 g/cm^{3} (Note: Assuming a diameter of 137 km.)
- Equatorial surface gravity: 0.0263 m/s^{2}
- Equatorial escape velocity: 0.0599 km/s
- Synodic rotation period: 8.984 h (0.3743 d)
- Geometric albedo: 0.052±0.006
- Temperature: ~157 K
- Spectral type: C
- Absolute magnitude (H): 8.58

104 Klymene is a large, dark Themistian asteroid that was discovered by J. C. Watson on September 13, 1868, and named after one of the many Clymenes in Greek mythology. It is orbiting the Sun with a period of 5.60 years and an eccentricity of 0.16. The orbital plane is inclined by 2.8° to the plane of the ecliptic. It is classified as a C-type asteroid, indicating it probably has a carbonaceous composition. The spectra indicates the presence of aqueous-altered minerals on the surface based upon a sharp feature at a wavelength of 3 μm, and, as of 2015, is the only member of the Themis family found to show this absorption.

Based upon measurements made using adaptive optics at the W. M. Keck Observatory, this object may have a bi-lobed shape with a length of 163 ± 3 km and width of 103 ± 5 km, for an average dimension of 133 km. This asteroid is located near the region of the Themis family but itself considered a background asteroid using HCM-analysis. It is listed as a member of the Hecuba group of asteroids that orbit near the 2:1 mean-motion resonance with Jupiter.

104 Klymene has been observed to occult 6 stars between 2009 and 2023.
