= 2010 AU118 =

Mars-crossing asteroid

2010 AU_{118}
Discovery
- Discovered by: WISE (C51)
- Discovery date: 27 May 2010

Designations
- Designation: 2010 AU_{118}
- Alternative names: 2025 ES_{3}
- Minor planet category: Mars-crossing

Orbital characteristics
- Epoch 21 November 2025
- Uncertainty parameter 2
- Observation arc: 5,556 days (15.21 years)
- Aphelion: 4.40099 AU (Q)
- Perihelion: 1.37270 AU (q)
- Semi-major axis: 2.88684 AU (a)
- Eccentricity: 0.524497
- Orbital period (sidereal): 4.90505 years (1,791.57 days)
- Mean anomaly: 115.811° (M)
- Inclination: 42.4926°
- Longitude of ascending node: 49.5165°
- Argument of perihelion: 18.2944°
- Earth MOID: 0.401984 AU (60,136,000 km)

Physical characteristics
- Dimensions: ~1.9 km
- Mass: 9.7×10^{11} kg (assumed)
- Absolute magnitude (H): 17.28

2010 AU_{118} is a Mars-crosser asteroid on an eccentric and highly inclined orbit with an observation arc of 5,556 days. It was announced on 27 May 2010 based on images taken by the Wide-field Infrared Survey Explorer (WISE) on 13–15 January 2010. It was removed from the Sentry Risk Table on 14 June 2014 as a result of an update to the Sentry software. Another software update restored it to the Sentry Risk Table in 2017. It was again removed from the sentry list on 3 October 2018. The asteroid was rediscovered as 2025 ES_{3} on 1 March 2025. This extended the observation arc from 1.4 days to 15 years.

2010 AU_{118} was observed 19 times over a very short observation arc of 1.4 days during 13–15 January 2010, and a further 19 times up to 31 March 2025. On 14 January 2010 the asteroid was estimated to have been 1.8 AU (270,000,000 km; 170,000,000 mi) from Earth with an uncertainty in the asteroids distance of ±300 million km. The asteroid's orbit might not get closer than Mars and/or reach beyond Jupiter.

WISE estimates the asteroid to be 1,900 meters (6,200 ft) in diameter. In 2018, 2010 AU_{118} was the largest object listed on the Sentry Risk Table. It has an uncertainty parameter of 2. Virtual clones of the asteroid that fit the uncertainty region in the known trajectory, showed a 1 in 770 million chance that the asteroid would have impacted the Earth on 20 October 2020. With a Palermo Technical Scale of −3.14, the odds of an impact by 2010 AU_{118} in 2020 were about 1400 times less than the background hazard level of Earth impacts, which is defined as the average risk posed by objects of the same size or larger over the years until the date of the potential impact. NEODyS lists the nominal 20 October 2020 Earth distance as 3 AU (450,000,000 km; 280,000,000 mi).
