= 103 Hera =

Main-belt asteroid

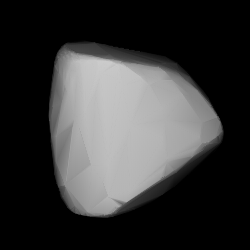
- 3D convex shape model of 103 Hera

Discovery
- Discovered by: James Craig Watson
- Discovery date: 7 September 1868

Designations
- Pronunciation: /ˈhɪərə/
- Named after: Hera
- Alternative designations: A868 RA, 1927 CV; 1950 CM
- Minor planet category: Main belt

Orbital characteristics
- Epoch 31 July 2016 (JD 2457600.5)
- Uncertainty parameter 0
- Observation arc: 144.99 yr (52958 d)
- Aphelion: 2.92042 AU (436.889 Gm)
- Perihelion: 2.48175 AU (371.265 Gm)
- Semi-major axis: 2.70109 AU (404.077 Gm)
- Eccentricity: 0.0812034
- Orbital period (sidereal): 4.44 yr (1621.5 d)
- Average orbital speed: 18.09 km/s
- Mean anomaly: 133.341°
- Mean motion: 0° 13^{m} 19.279^{s} / day
- Inclination: 5.41957°
- Longitude of ascending node: 136.186°
- Argument of perihelion: 188.361°
- Earth MOID: 1.46898 AU (219.756 Gm)
- Jupiter MOID: 2.32392 AU (347.653 Gm)
- T_{Jupiter}: 3.356

Physical characteristics
- Dimensions: 91.20±5.6 km
- Mass: (6.0±1.8)×10^{17} kg (Note: Calculated from its standard gravitational parameter GM = 0.040±0.012 km^{3}/s^{2}.)
- Mean density: 1.95 g/cm^{3} (Note: Assuming a diameter of 83.9 km.)
- Equatorial surface gravity: 0.0255 m/s²
- Equatorial escape velocity: 0.0482 km/s
- Synodic rotation period: 23.740 h (0.9892 d); 0.9892 d
- Geometric albedo: 0.1833±0.025
- Temperature: ~170 K
- Spectral type: S
- Absolute magnitude (H): 7.66

103 Hera is a moderately large main-belt asteroid with an orbital period of 4.44 years. It was discovered by Canadian-American astronomer James Craig Watson on 7 September 1868, and named after Hera, queen and fifth in power of the Olympian gods in Greek mythology. This is a stony S-type asteroid with a silicate surface composition.

Photometric observations made in 2010 at the Organ Mesa Observatory at Las Cruces, New Mexico, and the Hunters Hill Observatory at Ngunnawal, Australian Capital Territory, give a synodic rotation period of 23.740±0.001 h. The bimodal light curve shows a maximum brightness variation of 0.45 ± 0.03 in magnitude.

Measurements made with the IRAS observatory give a diameter of 91.58±4.14 km and a geometric albedo of 0.19±0.02. By comparison, the MIPS photometer on the Spitzer Space Telescope gives a diameter of 88.30±8.51 km and a geometric albedo of 0.20±0.04. When the asteroid was observed occulting a star, the chords showed a diameter of 89.1±1.1 km.
