= 161 Athor =

Main-belt asteroid

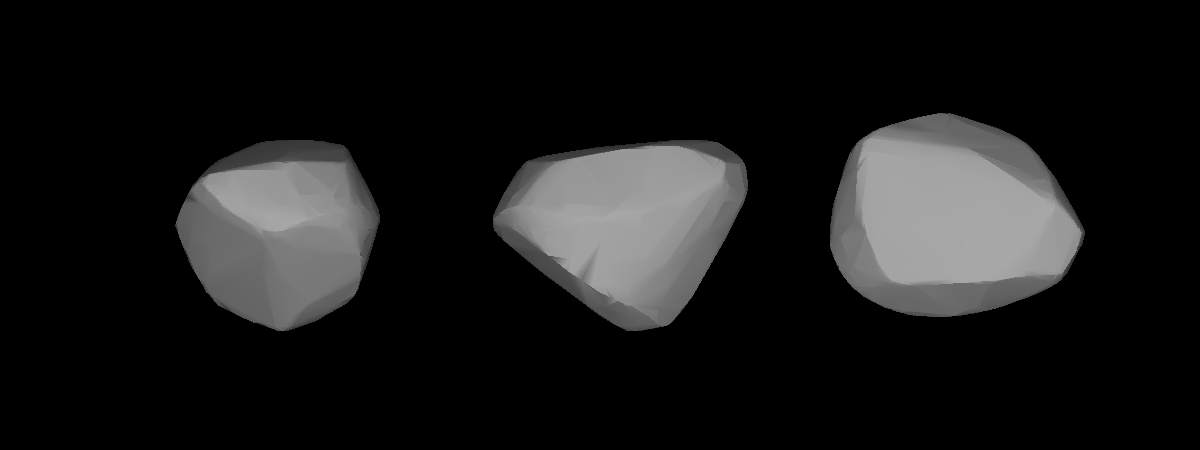
- A three-dimensional model of 161 Athor based on its lightcurve

Discovery
- Discovered by: James Craig Watson
- Discovery site: Detroit Observatory
- Discovery date: 19 April 1876

Designations
- Pronunciation: /ˈæθər/, /ˈɑːθər/
- Named after: Hathor
- Alternative designations: A876 HA; 1899 TA; 1961 PF; 1973 YN_{4}
- Minor planet category: Main belt

Orbital characteristics
- Epoch 31 July 2016 (JD 2457600.5)
- Uncertainty parameter 0
- Observation arc: 116.50 yr (42551 d)
- Aphelion: 2.70593 AU (404.801 Gm)
- Perihelion: 2.05285 AU (307.102 Gm)
- Semi-major axis: 2.37939 AU (355.952 Gm)
- Eccentricity: 0.137237
- Orbital period (sidereal): 3.67 yr (1340.6 d)
- Mean anomaly: 348.807°
- Mean motion: 0° 16^{m} 6.737^{s} / day
- Inclination: 9.05986°
- Longitude of ascending node: 18.6090°
- Time of perihelion: 2024-Jan-13
- Argument of perihelion: 295.007°

Physical characteristics
- Mean diameter: 43 ± 4 km (composite estimate); 44.19±3.3 km 47.0±0.2 km (circular fit)
- Synodic rotation period: 7.280 h (0.3033 d); 7.281 ± 0.001 hours 7.288 ± 0.007 hours
- Geometric albedo: 0.21 ± 0.02 (composite estimate); 0.1980±0.033
- Spectral type: M
- Absolute magnitude (H): 9.15

161 Athor is an M-type Main belt asteroid that was discovered by James Craig Watson on 19 April 1876, at the Detroit Observatory and named after Hathor, an Egyptian fertility goddess. It is the namesake of a proposed Athor asteroid family, estimated to be ~3 billion years old.

Photometric observations of the minor planet in 2010 gave a rotation period of 7.2798±0.0001 h with an amplitude of 0.19±0.02 in magnitude. This result is consistent with previous determinations. An occultation by Athor was observed, on 15 October 2002, showing an estimated diameter of 47.0 kilometres (29.2 mi). The spectra is similar to that of carbonaceous chondrites, with characteristics of ferric oxides and little or no hydrated minerals.
