= 133 Cyrene =

Main-belt asteroid

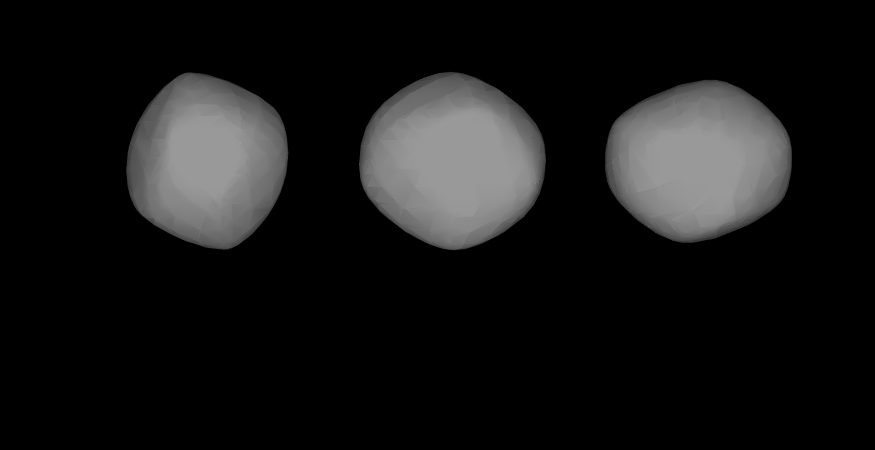
- Lightcurve-based 3D model of 133 Cyrene.

Discovery
- Discovered by: James Craig Watson
- Discovery site: Angell Hall Observatory
- Discovery date: 16 August 1873

Designations
- Pronunciation: /saɪˈriːniː/
- Named after: Cyrene (nymph)
- Alternative designations: A873 QA · A910 NB · 1936 HO · 1948 QC · 1959 UR (Note: The MPC notates Aethra's retroactive new-style designations as 1873 QA and 1910 NB.)
- Minor planet category: Main belt
- Adjectives: Cyrenean /saɪrɪˈniːən/, Cyrenian /saɪˈriːniən/

Orbital characteristics
- Epoch 21 November 2025 (JD 2461000.5)
- Uncertainty parameter 0
- Observation arc: 152.13 yr (55566 d)
- Aphelion: 7.2245 AU (1,080.77 Gm)
- Perihelion: 2.6736 AU (399.96 Gm)
- Semi-major axis: 3.0742 AU (459.89 Gm)
- Eccentricity: 0.1303
- Orbital period (sidereal): 5.3902 yr (1968.77 d)
- Average orbital speed: 17.03 km/s
- Mean anomaly: 219.02°
- Mean motion: 0° 10^{m} 58.26^{s} / day
- Inclination: 7.2245°
- Longitude of ascending node: 318.67°
- Argument of perihelion: 291.65°
- Earth MOID: 1.6686 AU (249.62 Gm)
- Jupiter MOID: 1.6595 AU (248.26 Gm)
- T_{Jupiter}: 3.205

Physical characteristics
- Dimensions: 66.57±6.0 km
- Mass: 3.1 × 10^{17} kg
- Mean density: 2.0? g/cm^{3}
- Equatorial surface gravity: 0.0186 m/s²
- Equatorial escape velocity: 0.0352 km/s
- Synodic rotation period: 12.708 h (0.5295 d); 12.707 h (0.5295 d)
- Geometric albedo: 0.2563±0.053; 0.2563
- Temperature: ~133 K
- Spectral type: S
- Absolute magnitude (H): 7.98, 7.990

133 Cyrene is a fairly large and very bright asteroid located in the main asteroid belt. It was discovered by J. C. Watson on 16 August 1873 at Angell Hall Observatory in Ann Arbor, Michigan, and named after Cyrene, a nymph, daughter of king Hypseus and beloved of Apollo in Greek mythology. It is classified as an S-type asteroid based upon its spectrum. It is listed as a member of the Hecuba group of asteroids that orbit near the 2:1 mean-motion resonance with Jupiter.

== Discovery and naming ==
Cyrene was discovered on 16 August 1873 by astronomer James Craig Watson at Angell Hall Observatory in Ann Arbor, Michigan, United States. Its discovery, alongside that of 132 Aethra, was announced in the journal Astronomische Nachrichten on 30 August. The asteroid was given the name Cyrene after the Greek mythological figure Cyrene, daughter of the Lapithian king Hypseus. With the god Apollo, she bore her two sons Aristaeus and Idmon.

== Orbit ==
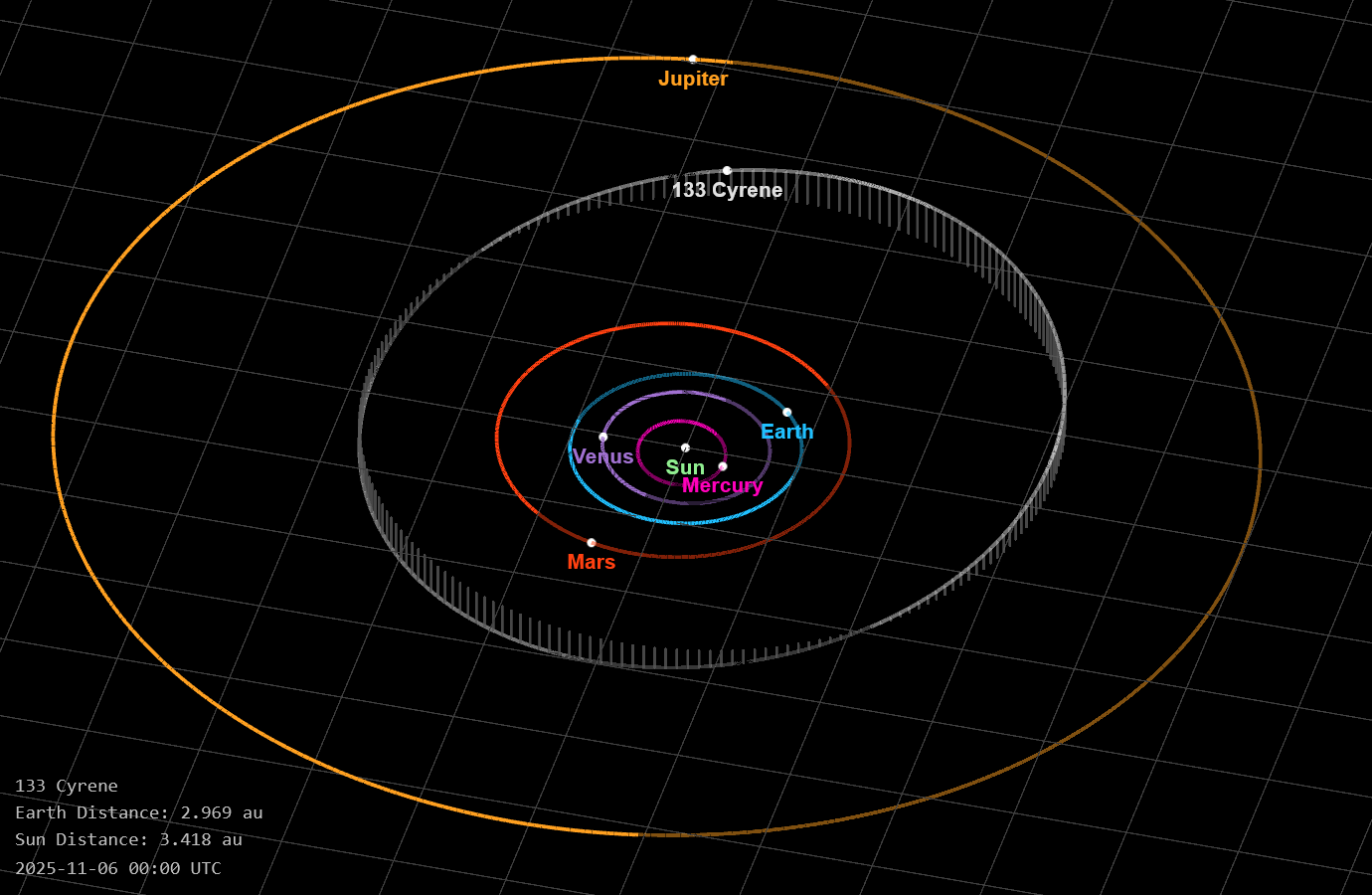
An orbital diagram of 133 Cyrene. The ecliptic grid and the orbits of the inner planets and Jupiter are also shown.

Cyrene is a main belt asteroid, orbiting the Sun at an average distance—its semi-major axis—of 3.07 astronomical units (AU). Along its 5.39 year long orbit, its distance from the Sun varies from 2.67 AU at perihelion to 3.47 AU at aphelion due to its orbital eccentricity of 0.13. It has an orbital inclination of 7.22° with respect to the ecliptic plane.

== Physical characteristics ==
In the Tholen classification system, it is categorized as a stony SR-type asteroid. Photometric observations of this asteroid at the Altimira Observatory in 1985 gave a light curve with a period of 12.707 ± 0.015 hours and a brightness variation of 0.22 in magnitude. This result matches previous measurements reported in 1984 and 2005.

== See also ==
Minor planets named after figures related to Cyrene:

- 1862 Apollo – A near-Earth asteroid (NEA) named after Cyrene's lover
- 2135 Aristaeus – An NEA named after Cyrene's son
