= 100 Hekate =

Main-belt asteroid

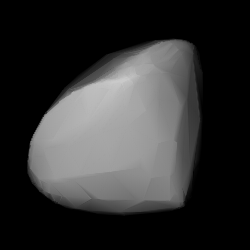
- 3D convex shape model of Hekate

Discovery
- Discovered by: J. C. Watson
- Discovery date: 11 July 1868

Designations
- Pronunciation: /ˈhɛkətiː/
- Named after: Hecate
- Alternative designations: 1955 QA
- Minor planet category: Main belt
- Adjectives: Hekatean (Hecatæan) /hɛkəˈtiːən/

Orbital characteristics
- Epoch 2025 Nov 21 (JD 2461000.5)
- Uncertainty parameter 0
- Observation arc: 154.56 yr (56452 d)
- Aphelion: 3.60957 AU (539.984 Gm)
- Perihelion: 2.57132 AU (384.664 Gm)
- Semi-major axis: 3.09045 AU (462.325 Gm)
- Eccentricity: 0.16798
- Orbital period (sidereal): 5.433 yr (1984.4 d)
- Mean anomaly: 323.244°
- Mean motion: 0° 10^{m} 53.093^{s} / day
- Inclination: 6.43092°
- Longitude of ascending node: 127.156°
- Argument of perihelion: 183.552°
- Earth MOID: 1.55453 AU (232.554 Gm)
- Jupiter MOID: 1.66378 AU (248.898 Gm)
- T_{Jupiter}: 3.194

Physical characteristics
- Dimensions: 88.734±1.961 km 89 km
- Mass: (1.30±0.33)×10^{18} kg (Note: Calculated from its standard gravitational parameter GM = 0.087±0.022 km^{3}/s^{2}.)
- Mean density: 3.97 g/cm^{3} (Note: Assuming a diameter of 85.7 km.)
- Equatorial surface gravity: ~0.033 m/s^{2}
- Equatorial escape velocity: ~0.054 km/s
- Synodic rotation period: 27.066 h (1.1278 d); 0.5555 d
- Geometric albedo: 0.205±0.01; 0.192
- Temperature: ~154 K max: 238K (−35 °C)
- Spectral type: S-type asteroid
- Absolute magnitude (H): 7.67

100 Hekate is a large main-belt asteroid.

== About ==
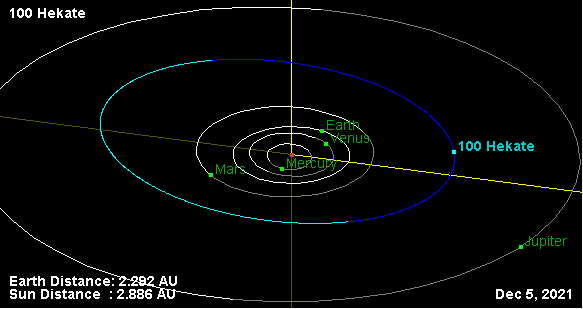
Orbit of Hekate

Hekate is a stony S-type asteroid with a diameter of 87+5
−4 km and a sidereal rotation period of 27.07 h. It orbits in the same region of space as the Hygiea asteroid family, though it is actually an unrelated interloper. Its geometric albedo of 0.22±0.03 is too high, and it is of the wrong spectral class to be part of the dark carbonaceous Hygiea family. It is listed as a member of the Hecuba group of asteroids that orbit near the 2:1 mean-motion resonance with Jupiter.

Hekate was the 100th asteroid to be discovered, by Canadian-American astronomer J. C. Watson (his fourth discovery) on July 11, 1868. It is named after Hecate, the goddess of witchcraft in Greek mythology, but its name also commemorates it as the hundredth asteroid, as ἑκατόν (hekaton) is Greek for 'hundred'.

An occultation of a star by Hekate was observed on July 14, 2003, from New Zealand.

== See also ==
- List of minor planets: 1–1000
- 100000 Astronautica
