= 106 Dione =

Main-belt asteroid

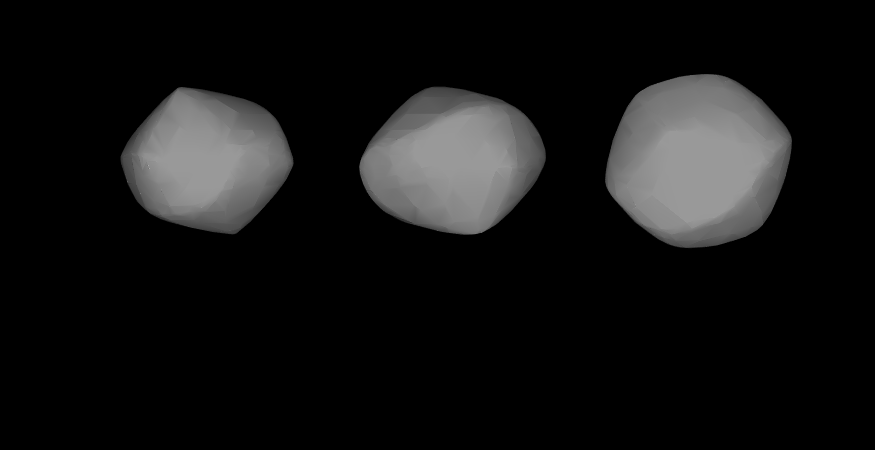
- 106 Dione 3D Lightcurve model

Discovery
- Discovered by: James Craig Watson
- Discovery date: 10 October 1868

Designations
- Pronunciation: /daɪˈoʊniː/
- Named after: Dione
- Alternative designations: A868 TA, 1902 TA
- Minor planet category: Main belt

Orbital characteristics
- Epoch 31 July 2016 (JD 2457600.5)
- Uncertainty parameter 0
- Observation arc: 145.03 yr (52972 d)
- Aphelion: 3.7032 AU (553.99 Gm)
- Perihelion: 2.64584 AU (395.812 Gm)
- Semi-major axis: 3.17451 AU (474.900 Gm)
- Eccentricity: 0.16653
- Orbital period (sidereal): 5.66 yr (2065.9 d)
- Average orbital speed: 16.61 km/s
- Mean anomaly: 51.5257°
- Mean motion: 0° 10^{m} 27.336^{s} / day
- Inclination: 4.5972°
- Longitude of ascending node: 62.163°
- Argument of perihelion: 329.725°
- Earth MOID: 1.65175 AU (247.098 Gm)
- Jupiter MOID: 1.73379 AU (259.371 Gm)
- T_{Jupiter}: 3.175

Physical characteristics
- Mean diameter: 146.60±3.41 km (composite estimate); 146.59±2.8 km
- Mass: (3.30±0.25)×10^{18} kg (Note: Calculated from its standard gravitational parameter GM = 0.220±0.017 km^{3}/s^{2}.)
- Mean density: 0.70 g/cm^{3} (Note: Assuming a diameter of 208 km.)
- Equatorial surface gravity: 0.0410 m/s²
- Equatorial escape velocity: 0.0775 km/s
- Synodic rotation period: 16.26 h (0.678 d); 16.26 ± 0.02 h
- Geometric albedo: 0.0893±0.003
- Temperature: ~156 K
- Spectral type: G (Tholen); Cgh (Bus)
- Absolute magnitude (H): 7.41

106 Dione is a large main-belt asteroid. It probably has a composition similar to 1 Ceres. It was discovered by J. C. Watson on October 10, 1868, and named after Dione, a Titaness in Greek mythology who was sometimes said to have been the mother of Aphrodite, the Greek goddess of love and beauty. It is listed as a member of the Hecuba group of asteroids that orbit near the 2:1 mean-motion resonance with Jupiter. The orbital period for this object is 5.66 years and it has an eccentricity of 0.17.

Measurements made with the IRAS observatory give a diameter of 169.92±7.86 km and a geometric albedo of 0.07±0.01. By comparison, the MIPS photometer on the Spitzer Space Telescope gives a diameter of 168.72±8.89 km and a geometric albedo of 0.07±0.01. Dione was observed to occult a dim star on January 19, 1983, by observers in Denmark, Germany and the Netherlands. A diameter of 147±3 km was deduced, closely matching the value acquired by the IRAS satellite. As of 2012, the mean diameter derived through occultation measurements is 176.7±0.4 km.

Photometric observations of this asteroid collected during 2004–2005 show a rotation period of 16.26±0.02 hours with a brightness variation of 0.08±0.02 magnitude. It is classified as a rare G-type asteroid, suggesting it has a carbonaceous composition with phyllosilicate minerals also being detected.
