= 79 Eurynome =

Main-belt asteroid

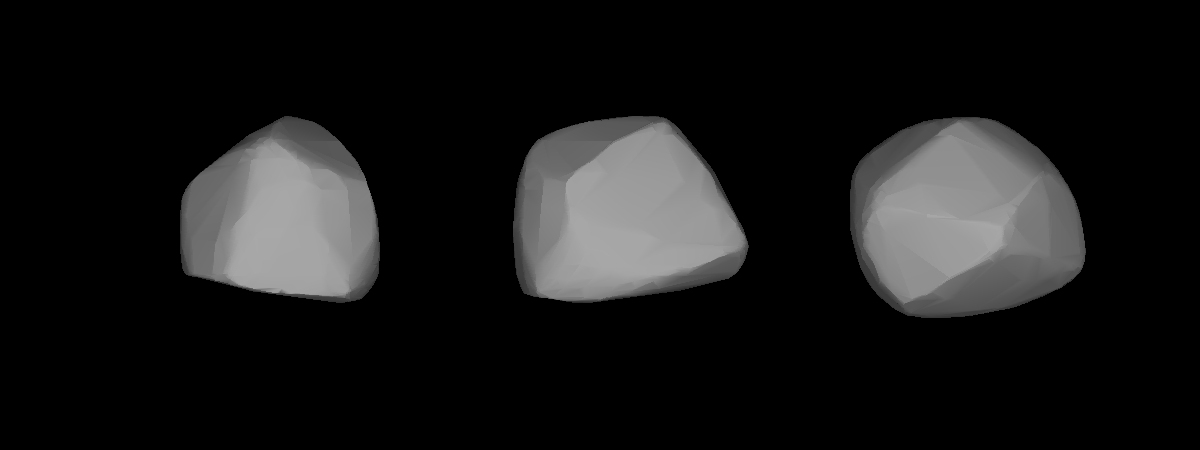
- A three-dimensional model of 79 Eurynome based on its lightcurve

Discovery
- Discovered by: James Craig Watson
- Discovery date: 14 September 1863

Designations
- Pronunciation: /jʊˈrɪnəmiː/
- Named after: Eurynome
- Minor planet category: Main belt
- Adjectives: Eurynomean, Eurynomian

Orbital characteristics
- Epoch 9 June 2026 (JD 2461200.5)
- Uncertainty parameter 0
- Aphelion: 2.9108 AU
- Perihelion: 1.9777 AU
- Semi-major axis: 2.4442 AU
- Eccentricity: 0.1909
- Orbital period (sidereal): 1395.76 d (3.8214 yr)
- Average orbital speed: 18.87 km/s
- Mean anomaly: 178.928°
- Inclination: 4.6128°
- Longitude of ascending node: 206.501°
- Argument of perihelion: 201.390°
- T_{Jupiter}: 3.470

Physical characteristics
- Dimensions: 66.5 km
- Mass: (4.94±0.45)×10^{17} kg (Note: Calculated from its standard gravitational parameter GM = 0.033±0.003 km^{3}/s^{2}.)
- Mean density: 3.65 g/cm^{3} (Note: Assuming a diameter of 63.5 km.)
- Synodic rotation period: 5.978 h
- Geometric albedo: 0.262
- Spectral type: S
- Apparent magnitude: 9.35 (brightest)
- Absolute magnitude (H): 7.96

79 Eurynome is a quite large and bright main-belt asteroid composed of silicate rock. Eurynome was discovered by J. C. Watson on 14 September 1863. It was his first asteroid discovery and is named after one of the many Eurynomes in Greek mythology. It is orbiting the Sun with a period of 3.82 years and has a rotation period of six hours. This is the eponymous member of a proposed asteroid family with at least 43 members, including 477 Italia and 917 Lyka.
