= 101 Helena =

Main-belt asteroid

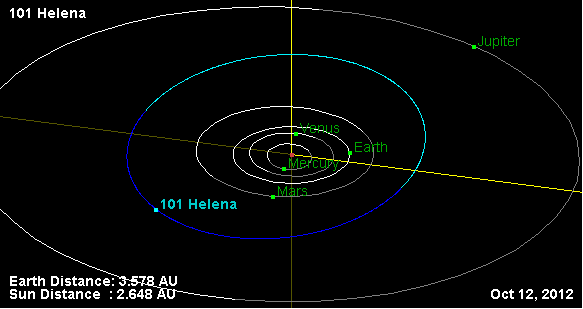
- Orbital diagram

Discovery
- Discovered by: James Craig Watson
- Discovery date: 15 August 1868

Designations
- Pronunciation: /ˈhɛlənə/
- Named after: Helen of Troy
- Alternative designations: A868 PA
- Minor planet category: Main belt

Orbital characteristics
- Epoch 31 July 2016 (JD 2457600.5)
- Uncertainty parameter 0
- Observation arc: 145.07 yr (52986 d)
- Aphelion: 2.94606 AU (440.724 Gm)
- Perihelion: 2.22353 AU (332.635 Gm)
- Semi-major axis: 2.58480 AU (386.681 Gm)
- Eccentricity: 0.13977
- Orbital period (sidereal): 4.16 yr (1517.9 d)
- Average orbital speed: 18.44 km/s
- Mean anomaly: 236.265°
- Mean motion: 0° 14^{m} 13.823^{s} / day
- Inclination: 10.1976°
- Longitude of ascending node: 343.419°
- Argument of perihelion: 348.030°
- Earth MOID: 1.21369 AU (181.565 Gm)
- Jupiter MOID: 2.4117 AU (360.79 Gm)
- T_{Jupiter}: 3.387

Physical characteristics
- Dimensions: 65.84±1.3 km
- Mass: 3.0×10^{17} kg
- Mean density: 2.0 g/cm^{3}
- Equatorial surface gravity: 0.0184 m/s^{2}
- Equatorial escape velocity: 0.0348 km/s
- Synodic rotation period: 23.080 h (0.9617 d)
- Geometric albedo: 0.1898±0.008
- Temperature: ~173 K
- Spectral type: S
- Absolute magnitude (H): 8.33

101 Helena is a large, rocky main-belt asteroid. It was discovered by Canadian-American astronomer J. C. Watson on August 15, 1868, and was named after Helen of Troy in Greek mythology.

This object is orbiting the Sun with a period of 4.16 years and an eccentricity of 0.14. Its orbital plane is inclined by 10.2° to the plane of the ecliptic. Radar observations were made of this object on Oct 7 and 19, 2001 from the Arecibo Observatory. Analysis of the data gave an estimated ellipsoidal diameter of 71×63×63 ± 16% km. The mean diameter estimated from IRAS infrared measurements is 66 km, in agreement with the radar findings. It is classified as an S-type asteroid in the Tholen system, suggesting a predominantly silicate composition. 101 Helena is spinning on its axis with a period of 23 hours.
