= Ersa =

Greek water deity

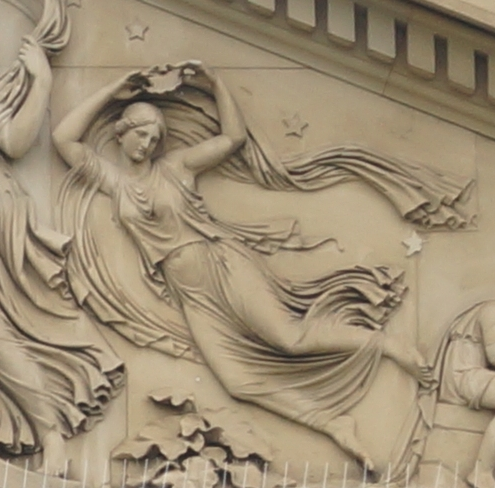

In Greek mythology, according to Plutarch, the 7th century BC Greek poet Alcman said that Ersa /ˈɜːrsə/ or Herse /ˈhɜːrsiː/ (Ἔρσα, Érsa, Ἕρση, Hérsē, literally "dew"), the personification of dew, is the daughter of Zeus and the Moon (Selene).

Plutarch writes:

We observe this happening to the air also: it sheds dew especially at the full moon when it melts, as the lyric poet Alcman says somewhere when he talks in riddling fashion of the dew as daughter of air and moon:
such things as are nurtured by Dew, daughter of Zeus and Selene.
