= Michael Kusugak =

Canadian Inuk children's writer and storyteller

- ᐊᕐᕚᕐᓗᒃ ᑯᓱᒐᖅ
- Born: April 27, 1948 (age 78); Qatiktalik, Northwest Territories, Canada (now in Nunavut)
- Writing career
- Notable awards: Ruth and Sylvia Schwartz Children’s Book Award (1994); Vicky Metcalf Award (2004)

Michael Arvaarluk Kusugak (Inuktitut: ᐊᕐᕚᕐᓗᒃ ᑯᓱᒐᖅ; born April 27, 1948) is a Canadian Inuk storyteller and children's writer, who tells stories about Arctic and Inuit culture.

== Life and career ==
He was born April 27, 1948, just north of Chesterfield Inlet, at a point of land called Qatiktalik (known as Cape Fullerton in English). That same spring of 1948, he and his family moved to Repulse Bay and in 1960 to Rankin Inlet. As of 2022, he lives in Manitoba, near Lake Winnipeg.

In 1954, at age six, Michael Kusugak and many of his friends were sent away to residential school. The teachers were strict and did not allow the children to speak their own language, Inuktitut. Kusugak remembers sitting in the back of the class crying most of the time. The following year, Kusugak successfully hid when the plane came to take him and his friends away again. However, he returned the following year and became one of the first Inuit in the eastern Arctic to graduate from high school. He was also educated in Yellowknife, Churchill and Saskatoon. He has later worked as an educational administrator for Nunavut Arctic College.

Michael Kusugak grew up living a traditional, nomadic Inuit life with his family. He realized his love of storytelling in this environment, with his grandmother telling him a story each night. Once Kusugak had his own children, he realized that there was very little written for children about life in the Arctic, so he started telling them his grandmother's stories. In the late 1980s, Robert Munsch visited a local school and stayed in the Kusugak household. Along with Munsch as a co-author, Kusugak wrote his first book, A Promise is a Promise, published in 1988. His books have been published in French, Korean, Japanese and Braille.

All of Kusugak's books, except for T is for Territories, which is part of a non-fiction series, are illustrated by Vladyana Krykorka. Krykorka came to Toronto from Prague when the Soviet Union invaded Czechoslovakia. She illustrated A Promise is a Promise in 1988, and since then has been to Nunavut many times to visit, photograph and paint the land and people. She has also written and illustrated a set of her own books depicting the land and animals of the north: Arctic Land, Arctic Sea, and Arctic Sky.

== Reception ==
Kusugak speaks from "the in-between of cultures," and finds common ground between the very different parts of Canada. Kusugak takes stories that he tells out loud in Inuktitut, and put them into writing in English. He rehearses his stories first out loud, and his books are praised for having "the well-worn feeling of an old, much-told tale".

Kusugak said of storytelling, "Before books, or even reading, should come the story. It should be told in person, with lots of repetition, facial expressions and feedback from listeners. You can take these stories and write them down, but I think you lose something if you don't actually go and tell them."

His stories have been used in Canadian classrooms.

== Awards and honors ==
In 1994, Northern Lights won the Ruth and Sylvia Schwartz Children’s Book Award.

In 2008, Kusugak won the Vicky Metcalf Award.

Ijiraq, Kiviuq, and Siarnaq, moons of Saturn, were named by astronomer John J. Kavelaars after encountering the figures in one of Kusugak's books. Paaliaq, another moon, was named after one of Kusugak's original characters featured in The Curse Of The Shaman: A Marble Island Story.

== Themes ==
Kusugak's work reflects many of the common themes in Canadian Indigenous children's literature. In his books, many of the heroes are strong female protagonists, girls who get themselves out of tight situations by being clever and resourceful. This is one of the ways that Indigenous authors try to counteract the particularly harsh destruction of Indigenous women, by European colonizers.

Another theme is Kusugak's focus on home and family, and the essential role of elders, particularly grandmothers. This is common as a way for Aboriginal authors to create positive cultural associations for children, and a positive image of home, which includes ‘the land’ much more than a physical house in Kusugak's stories. Often, his main characters are warned by a parent or grandparent about a potential danger, but don't believe them. In the end, they learn their lesson the hard way and learn to trust the knowledge of their elders.

== Publications ==
Michael Kusugak has written picture books, young readers’ novels and chapter books, and one non-fiction picture book.

- A Promise is a Promise. Co-authored by Robert Munsch. Annick Press. 1989. ISBN 978-1-773-21294-4.
- Baseball Bats for Christmas. Illustrated by Vladyana Langer Krykorka. Annick Press. 1990. ISBN 978-1-554-51928-6.
- Hide and Sneak. Illustrated by Vladyana Langer Krykorka. Annick Press. 1992. ISBN 978-1-550-37228-1.
- Northern Lights: The Soccer Trails. Illustrated by Vladyana Langer Krykorka. Annick Press. 1993.
- My Arctic 1, 2, 3. Illustrated by Vladyana Krykorka. Toronto: Annick Press. 1996. ISBN 978-1-55037-505-3. OCLC 35931866.
- Arctic Stories. Illustrated by Vladyana Langer Krykorka. Annick Press. 1998. ISBN 978-1-55037-452-0.
- Who Wants Rocks?. Illustrated by Vladyana Langer Krykorka. Annick Press. 1999. ISBN 978-1-550-37589-3.
- Munschworks 3: The Third Munsch Treasury. Co-written by Robert Munsch. Annick Press. 2000. ISBN 1-55037-633-0.
- The Munschworks Grand Treasury. Co-written by Robert Munsch; Illustrated by Hélène Desputeaux, Michael Martchenko, and Vladyana Krykorka. Annick Press. 2001. ISBN 978-1-550-37685-2.
- The Curse of the Shaman, A Marble Island Story. Illustrated by Vladyana Langer Krykorka. HarperTrophy. 2006. ISBN 978-0-006-39512-6.
- The Littlest Sled Dog. Illustrated by Vladyana Langer Krykorka. Orca Book Publishers. 2008. ISBN 978-1-55143-752-1.
- T is for Territories: a Yukon, Northwest Territories, and Nunavut Alphabet. Discover Canada. Illustrated by iris Churcher. Ann Arbor, MI: Sleeping Bear Press. 2013. ISBN 978-1-58536-207-3.
- Baby Arctic Animals. Strong Readers Northern Series. Illustrated by Bill Helin. 2014. ISBN 978-1-771-74060-9.
- Birds Come and Go. Strong Readers Northern Series. Illustrated by Bill Helin. 2014.
- A Dog Team. Strong Readers Northern Series. Illustrated by Bill Helin. 2014. ISBN 978-1-771-74059-3.
- I Build an Igloo. Strong Readers Northern Series. Illustrated by Bill Helin. 2014. ISBN 978-1-771-74062-3.
- Snow. Strong Readers Northern Series. Illustrated by Bill Helin. 2014. ISBN 978-1-771-74063-0.
- On Waiting. Illustrated by Susan Thurston Shirley. 2016.
- Inuit, Tundra and Ravens. 2017.
- Bush Pilots. Pearson. 2017. ISBN 978-0-134-69109-1.
- The Most Amazing Bird. Illustrated by Andrew Qappik. Annick Press. 2020. ISBN 978-1-77321-418-4.

=== Collection contributions ===
- Kusugak, Michael; Arnaktauyok, Germaine; Kusugak, Jose; Shirley, Susan; Freeman, George; Burns, Nicholas (2016). Arctic Comics. Renegade Arts Entertainment. ISBN 978-1-987825-03-9.

== Discography ==
- Inuit Songs & Stories: Learn How to Throat Sing
