= Ijiraq (moon) =

Moon of Saturn

- Discovery images of Ijiraq taken by the CFHT in September 2000

Discovery
- Discovered by: J. J. Kavelaars; B. J. Gladman
- Discovery date: 2000

Designations
- Designation: Saturn XXII
- Pronunciation: /ˈɪdʒɪrɑːk/
- Named after: Ijiraq
- Alternative names: S/2000 S 6
- Adjectives: Ijiraupian, Ijiraqian (Note: The genitive form of Ijiraq is Ijiraup. Thus the adjectival form could be absolutive Ijiraqian or genitive Ijiraupian, parallel to nominative Venusian and genitive Venerian for Venus. See Inuktitut morphology)

Orbital characteristics
- Epoch 2000 January 1.5
- Semi-major axis: 11.3447 Gm
- Eccentricity: 0.293
- Orbital period (sidereal): 451.12 d (1.24 yr)
- Inclination: 49.2°
- Satellite of: Saturn
- Group: Inuit group (Kiviuq)

Physical characteristics
- Mean diameter: 13+50% −30% km
- Synodic rotation period: 13.03±0.14 h
- Albedo: <0.15 <0.10 (likely); 0.06 (assumed)
- Spectral type: color: red B-V=1.05 R-V=0.58
- Apparent magnitude: 22.6
- Absolute magnitude (H): 13.2

Ijiraq, or Saturn XXII, is a small prograde irregular satellite of Saturn. It was discovered by the team of Brett Gladman, John J. Kavelaars, et al. in 2000, and given the temporary designation S/2000 S 6. It was named in 2003 after the ijiraq, a creature in Inuit mythology.

== Orbit ==
Irregular prograde groups of satellites of Saturn: Inuit (blue) and Gallic (red). The eccentricity of the orbits is represented by the yellow segments extending from the pericentre to the apocentre.

Ijiraq orbits Saturn at an average distance of 11.3 million km in 451 days on an orbit very similar to Kiviuq's. Ijiraq is believed to be in Kozai resonance: its orbit is cyclically reducing the inclination while increasing the eccentricity and vice versa. The orbital argument of pericenter oscillates around 90° with an amplitude of 60°. Like Kiviuq and Thrymr, Ijiraq's orbital elements overlap strongly with Phoebe's, and it is likely to collide with Phoebe in the future.

== Physical characteristics ==
While Ijiraq is a member of the Inuit group of irregular satellites, recent observations revealed that it is distinctively redder than Paaliaq, Siarnaq and Kiviuq. Its spectral slope (a measure of body reflectance in function of the wavelength) is twice as steep as that of other Inuit-group satellites (20% per 100 nm), typical for red trans-Neptunian objects like Sedna but unknown for irregular satellites. In addition, the Ijiraupian (Ijiraqan) spectrum lacks the weak absorption near 0.7 μm, attributed to a possible water hydration, found in the other three.

== Name ==
Ijiraq was named in 2003 after the ijiraq, a creature of Inuit mythology.

Kavelaars, an astronomer at McMaster University, suggested this name to help astronomical nomenclature to get out of its Greco-Romano-Renaissance rut. He spent several months trying to find names that were both multi-cultural and Canadian, consulting Amerindian scholars without finding a name that seemed appropriate. In March 2001, he was reading an Inuit tale to his children and had a revelation. The ijiraq plays at hide-and-seek, which is what these small moons of Saturn do: they are hard to find, and cold like the Canadian arctic (the team of discoverers includes Canadians, Norwegians and Icelanders—nordicity is their common trait). Kavelaars contacted the author of the tale, Michael Kusugak, to get his assent, and the latter also suggested the names for Kiviuq and 90377 Sedna.
