= Helin (surname) =

Helin is a surname.

== Geographical distribution ==
As of 2014, 42.5% of all known bearers of the surname Helin were residents of Finland (frequency 1:1,620), 15.1% of France (1:55,285), 15.0% of Sweden (1:8,240), 10.2% of the United States (1:442,168), 5.9% of Belgium (1:24,307), 1.9% of Canada (1:238,948), 1.6% of Nigeria (1:1,359,556), 1.5% of Indonesia (1:1,092,966), 1.4% of Argentina (1:395,773) and 1.0% of Estonia (1:16,317).

In Finland, the frequency of the surname was higher than national average (1:1,620) in the following regions:

1. Pirkanmaa (1:737)
2. Satakunta (1:834)
3. Tavastia Proper (1:929)
4. Southwest Finland (1:961)
5. Åland (1:1,009)
6. Päijänne Tavastia (1:1,242)
7. Uusimaa (1:1,564)

== People ==
- Anne Helin, Finnish ice hockey player
- Bill Helin, Canadian artist
- Calvin Helin, Canadian writer
- Eleanor F. Helin, American astronomer
- Johann Hélin, alternative spelling of Johann Heynlin (c. 1425–1496), a German born French scholar
- Mika Helin (born 1978), Finnish footballer
- Pekka Helin, architect who designed Pikkuparlamentti
- Sofia Helin (born 1972), Swedish actress
- Toomas Helin (born 1966), Estonian drug smuggler
- Topi Helin (born 1978), Finnish Thaiboxer
- Ville Helin, author of Wzonka-Lad
