= S/2019 S 1 =

Moon of Saturn

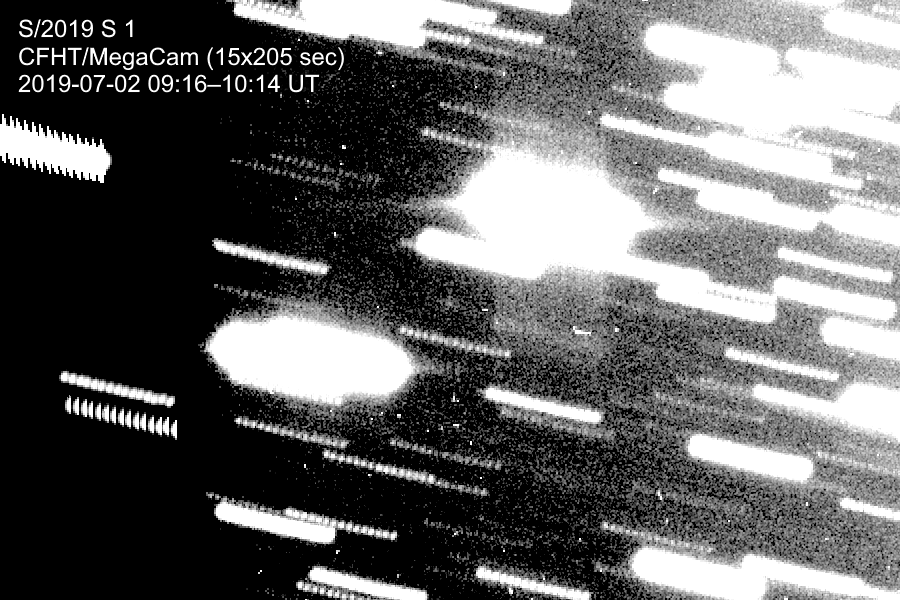
- Canada–France–Hawaii Telescope image of S/2019 S 1 (center), revealed by stacking many images while following the moon's motion

Discovery
- Discovered by: E. Ashton et al.
- Discovery date: 2019 (announced 2021)

Designations
- Alternative names: e26r58a12

Orbital characteristics
- Semi-major axis: 11221100 km
- Eccentricity: 0.623
- Orbital period (sidereal): 443.78 days
- Inclination: 44.4°
- Satellite of: Saturn
- Group: Inuit group (Kiviuq)

Physical characteristics
- Mean diameter: 5+30% −15% km
- Albedo: 0.06 (assumed)
- Apparent magnitude: 25.3
- Absolute magnitude (H): 15.3

S/2019 S 1 is a natural satellite of Saturn. Its discovery was announced by Edward Ashton, Brett J. Gladman, Jean-Marc Petit, and Mike Alexandersen on 16 November 2021 from Canada–France–Hawaii Telescope observations taken between 1 July 2019 and 14 June 2021.

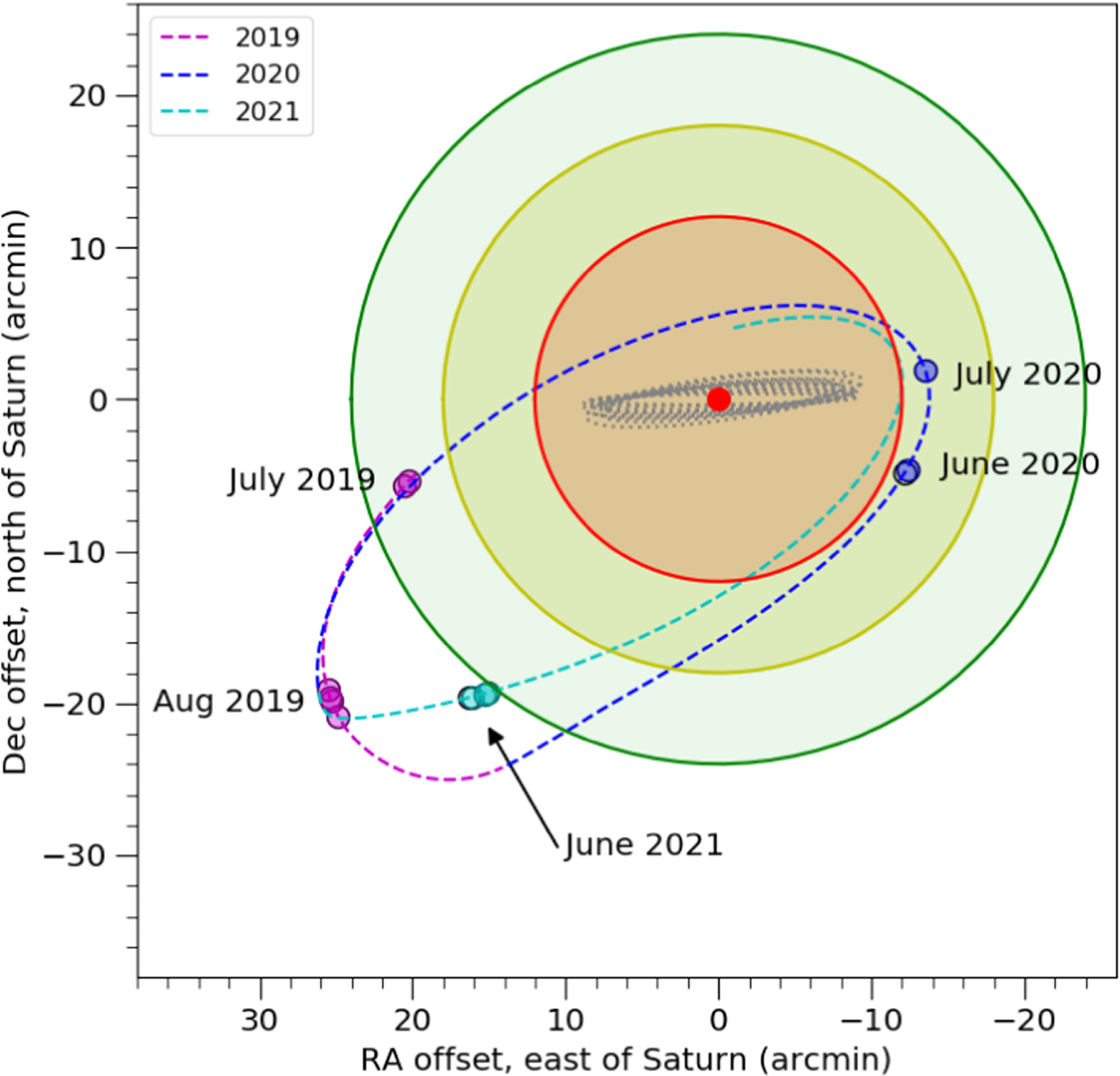
Apparent path of S/2019 S 1 as seen from Earth during 2019–2021. Coloured circles along the path mark the dates and locations at which the moon was observed.

S/2019 S 1 is about 5 kilometres in diameter, and orbits Saturn at an average distance of 11.2 million km (7.0 million mi) in 443.78 days, at an inclination of 44° to the ecliptic, in a prograde direction and with an eccentricity of 0.623. It belongs to the Inuit group of prograde irregular satellites, and is among the innermost irregular satellites of Saturn. It might be a collisional fragment of Kiviuq and Ijiraq, which share very similar orbital elements.

This moon's eccentric orbit takes it closer than 1.5 million km (0.93 million mi) to Iapetus several times per millennium.
