= A Bunch of Munsch =

- Genre: Comedy; Fantasy; Adventure; Slice of life; Musical
- Based on: Various works by Robert Munsch and illustrated by Michael Martchenko
- Narrated by: Robert Munsch
- Theme music composer: Jeff Zahn
- Opening theme: "A Bunch of Munsch Theme Song"
- Ending theme: "A Bunch of Munsch Theme Song" (instrumental)
- Composers: Jeff Fisher; Jeffrey Zahn
- Countries of origin: Canada; United States
- No. of episodes: 7

Production
- Executive producer: Micheline Charest
- Producer: Ronald A. Weinberg
- Running time: 23 minutes
- Production company: CINAR Films

Original release
- Network: CTV
- Release: December 7, 1991 – January 3, 1998
- Network: Showtime
- Release: December 17, 1991 – December 2, 1992

A Bunch of Munsch is an American-Canadian animated anthology television series produced by CINAR Films. Each episode is based on a book by American-Canadian children's author Robert Munsch. The show aired from December 7, 1991 to January 3, 1998 on CTV in Canada, and December 17, 1991 to December 2, 1992 on Showtime in the United States.

== Production ==
The series was announced by CINAR Films on January 12, 1991. The series was funded in part by grants from Telefilm Canada and the Maclean-Hunter Television Fund.

Every story featured a unique original song, usually sung by the lead character. "Mortimer Song" in the episode "Mortimer" was originally written by Robert Munsch in 1970.

== Broadcast ==
The first episode "Thomas' Snowsuit/50 Below Zero" aired as a winter special on CTV in Canada on December 7, 1991, and Showtime in the United States on December 17.

On January 17, 1992, Showtime announced A Bunch of Munsch would be one of three animated series to join their "Family Hour" block of children's programs in 1992 alongside American Heroes & Legends and Shelley Duvall's Bedtime Stories. The series began airing regularly on Showtime with "The Paper Bag Princess" on October 14, 1992, followed by the series premiere of American Heroes & Legends. CTV continued to air A Bunch of Munsch episodes as annual specials.

== Episode list ==
Seven episodes, each being two 11-minute segments in a 30-minute slot (the lone exception being "The Paper Bag Princess", which was one 22-minute episode divided into two segments), were created.

No.	Title	Directed by	Written by	Storyboarded by	Original Canadian air date (CTV)	Original U.S. air date (Showtime)	Prod. code
1	"Thomas' Snowsuit"	Bill Speers	Cassandra Schafhausen	Chris Schouten & Bill Speers	December 7, 1991	December 17, 1991	101
1	"50 Below Zero"	Bill Speers	Cassandra Schafhausen	Stephan Martiniere & Craig Wilson	December 7, 1991	December 17, 1991	101
Thomas tries to run away from the grown-ups such as the teacher and principal who want him to put an ugly brown snowsuit on him. Song: "No!" Jason realizes his house is going crazy, especially when Papa sleepwalks everywhere in the house and into dangerous situations. Song: "This House is Going Crazy"
2	"David's Father"	Bill Speers	Michel Choquette and Alan Annand	Bob Browning	December 5, 1992	October 21, 1992	102
2	"Pigs"	Bill Speers	Cassandra Schafhausen	Luc Savoie	December 5, 1992	October 21, 1992	102
A schoolgirl named Julie befriends her new neighbor, David, and his enormous father. Song: "Long Tall Daddy" Megan one day feeds the pigs on her family's farm, and opens the gate to the pig pen, thinking that they are dumb. This results in chaos in the farm and in her school, until she befriends a younger pig who she names Einstein. Song: "Pigs"
3	"Mortimer"	Bill Speers	Don Arioli	Steven Majaury and Meinert Hansen	December 14, 1995	October 28, 1992	103
3	"Something Good"	Steven Majaury	Don Druick	Bill Speers	December 14, 1995	October 28, 1992	103
A toddler named Mortimer makes a huge amount of noise in his house, which turns into a worldwide sensation at one point. Song: "Mortimer Song" Julie, Andrew, and Tyya (based on Robert Munsch's adopted children) are on a trip to the grocery store, and try to convince their strict father (based on Robert Munsch himself) into getting them various junk food that tastes good. Song: "Something Good"
4	"The Paper Bag Princess"	Craig Wilson	Michel Choquette, Alan Annand and Cheryl Blakeney	Craig Wilson and Robert Clark	November 28, 1993	October 14, 1992	104
Princess Elizabeth becomes friends with a dragon after she realizes the true colors of her fiancé Prince Ronald. Narrated by Robert Munsch. Songs: "The Dragon Rap" and "The Princess Song"
5	"The Boy in the Drawer"	Greg Bailey	Irene Berkowitz, Peter Landecker and Lucie Lortie	Greg Bailey and Chris Damboise	December 4, 1994	November 4, 1992	105
5	"Murmel, Murmel, Murmel"	Greg Bailey	Cheryl Blakeney	Greg Bailey and François Brisson	December 4, 1994	November 4, 1992	105
Shelley must find a way to stop a Delinquent little boy-minded and shaped gnome from causing chaos in her house while her parents ignore it. Song: "I'm So Happy" Robin finds an unusual baby named "Murmel, Murmel, Murmel" who can only say his name in a sandbox, who needs an owner. Song: "Have I Got A Baby For You"
6	"The Fire Station"	Steven Majaury	Thomas LaPierre	Steven Majaury	January 3, 1998	November 11, 1992	106
6	"Angela's Airplane"	Meinart Hansen	Cheryl Blakeney	Meinert Hansen	January 3, 1998	November 11, 1992	106
A boy and a girl named Michael and Sheila visit a fire station to wreak havoc and have fun, especially when they sneak onto a mission with the Dalmatian, Spot. Song: "I Want To Be A Hero" Angela, a little girl is obsessed with buttons and is very curious about the world sneaks onto an airplane and begins to have a fascination for it. Song: "Buttons"
7	"Moira's Birthday"	Craig Wilson	Stephen Ashton	Craig Wilson	December 1, 1994	December 2, 1992	107
7	"Blackberry Subway Jam"	Richard T. Morrison	Diana West	Richard T. Morrison	December 1, 1994	December 2, 1992	107
A little girl named Moira has an enormous and loud destructive birthday and invites her entire school. All they do is eat the entire time. Song: "Everybody Party" A young boy named Jonathan starts to notice subway station keep wreaking havoc in his apartment, so he decides to convince the man in charge of it at the City Hall by giving him crates of his favorite food, blackberry jam. Song: "Blackberry Subway Jam"

== Voices ==
- Julian Bailey
- Sonja Ball
- Matthew Barrot
- Thor Bishopric
- Eramelinda Boquer
- Tia Caroleo
- Richard M. Dumont
- Kathleen Fee
- Holly Gauthier-Frankel
- Amy Fulco
- Andrew Bauer-Gabor
- Norman Groulx
- Jesse Gryn
- Shayne Olszynko-Gryn
- Mark Hellman
- A. J. Henderson
- Arthur Holden
- Lisa Hull
- Gary Jewell
- Rick Jones
- Tamar Kozlov
- Liz MacRae
- Bronwen Mantel
- Gordon Masten
- Anik Matern
- Carlyle Miller
- George Morris
- Michael O'Reilly
- Lianne Picard-Poirier
- Hayley Reynolds
- Patricia Rodriguez
- Michael Rudder
- Terrence Scammell
- Kaya Scott
- Harry Standjofski
- Jory Steinberg
- Gab Taraboulsy
- Christian Tessier
- Jacob Tierney
- Vlasta Vrána
- June Wallack
- Jane Woods

== Distribution ==
=== VHS releases ===
All episodes were released to VHS by Golden Book Video in the early 1990s. The releases were eventually packaged and updated in the late 1990s by Sony Wonder.

=== DVD release ===
All episodes were released to DVD by Cookie Jar Entertainment. Mill Creek Entertainment released the complete series on DVD in Region 1 on August 4, 2015 which includes a bonus episode of The Busy World of Richard Scarry.
