= Love You Forever =

Book by Robert Munsch

- Author: Robert Munsch
- Illustrator: Sheila McGraw
- Language: English
- Publisher: Firefly Books
- Publication date: October 1, 1986
- Publication place: Canada
- Media type: Print (Hardback & Paperback)
- Pages: 31
- ISBN: 0-920668-37-2

Love You Forever is a 1986 children's picture book written by Robert Munsch and illustrated by Sheila McGraw. The book was written after Munsch and his wife had two stillborn babies. It began as a song that Munsch would sing in his head for his two babies as singing it out loud was too emotional. During a performance at a theatre in the University of Guelph, the short song turned into a full story that was later published as a book. Munsch and his wife have since adopted three children.

== Plot ==
A mother cradles her newborn son and sings a lullaby to him, the lyrics to which are: "I'll love you forever, I'll like you for always, as long as I'm living, my baby you'll be." Despite her aggravation with her son's behaviour as he grows up, the mother consistently visits his bedroom each night to sing this lullaby. After the son becomes an adult and moves across town, his mother occasionally visits him to sing the lullaby while he sleeps.

As the mother grows older, her health begins to decline, and she asks her son one day to visit her. When the son arrives, the mother attempts to sing her lullaby, but her illness prevents her from completing it. The son cradles his mother in his arms and sings the lullaby back to her, altering the last lyric to "my mommy you'll be". Upon returning home, the son enters the nursery and sings his mother's lullaby to his newborn daughter, implying that the cycle will continue.

== Reception ==
Love You Forever was listed fourth on the 2001 Publishers Weekly All-Time Bestselling Children's Books list for paperbacks at 6,970,000 copies (not including the 1,049,000 hardcover copies). In 2001, Maria Shriver wrote in O, The Oprah Magazine: "I have yet to read this book through without crying. It says so much about the circle of life, youth, parenting, and our responsibility for our parents as we grow older. The message is so simple yet so profound. Love You Forever is a great gift for anyone with a child, or even for your own parents." Based on a 2007 online poll, the National Education Association listed the book as one of its "Teachers' Top 100 Books for Children."

Some readers dislike the portion of the story where the mother sneaks into her grown son's home. One Publishers Weekly reviewer states that Love You Forever is a divisive children's book. "Either it moves you to tears and you love it, or it makes your skin crawl and you detest it..." A commentator wrote "it's either a touching account of a mother's unending love or the ultimate helicopter parenting gone bad."

The 15 original illustrations by Sheila McGraw were sold to a Winnipeg couple in December 2005 after being exhibited at Loch Gallery in Toronto. The illustrations were created using a mix of crayon, marker, pastel, and pencil crayon. In 2014, the 17 preliminary sketches were sold to a Vancouver antiques dealer for $50,000. The sketches included marginalia from Munsch and the owner of Firefly Books.

Several years after the book was first published, illustrator Sheila McGraw expressed dissatisfaction with the penultimate illustration of the father ascending the stairs. She prepared a replacement illustration for that page, and the new image has appeared in every printing since then.

In 2020, playwright Topher Payne released an alternate ending for the book, which he titled Love You Forever & I'll Call Before I Come Over, with art in the style of the original. In Payne's version, the son installs security bars on his windows; he subsequently explains to his mother that although he still loves her, he also needs personal space. Payne subsequently stated: "taken as metaphor, Love You Forever is beautiful, a mother's devotion. Taken literally, the mother is a little nuts."

== Media appearances ==
The book is prominently featured in the Friends episode "The One with the Cake". In the episode, Joey performs a dramatic reading of the book at Emma's first birthday (as he had forgotten to get a present and saw the book nearby), moving everyone to tears. Joey later realizes that he has forgotten to prepare for an upcoming audition and decides to recite the book as a monologue.
