= Inuit group =

Category of satellites of Saturn

Animation of Saturn's Inuit group of satellites Kiviuq · Ijiraq · Paaliaq · Siarnaq · Tarqeq

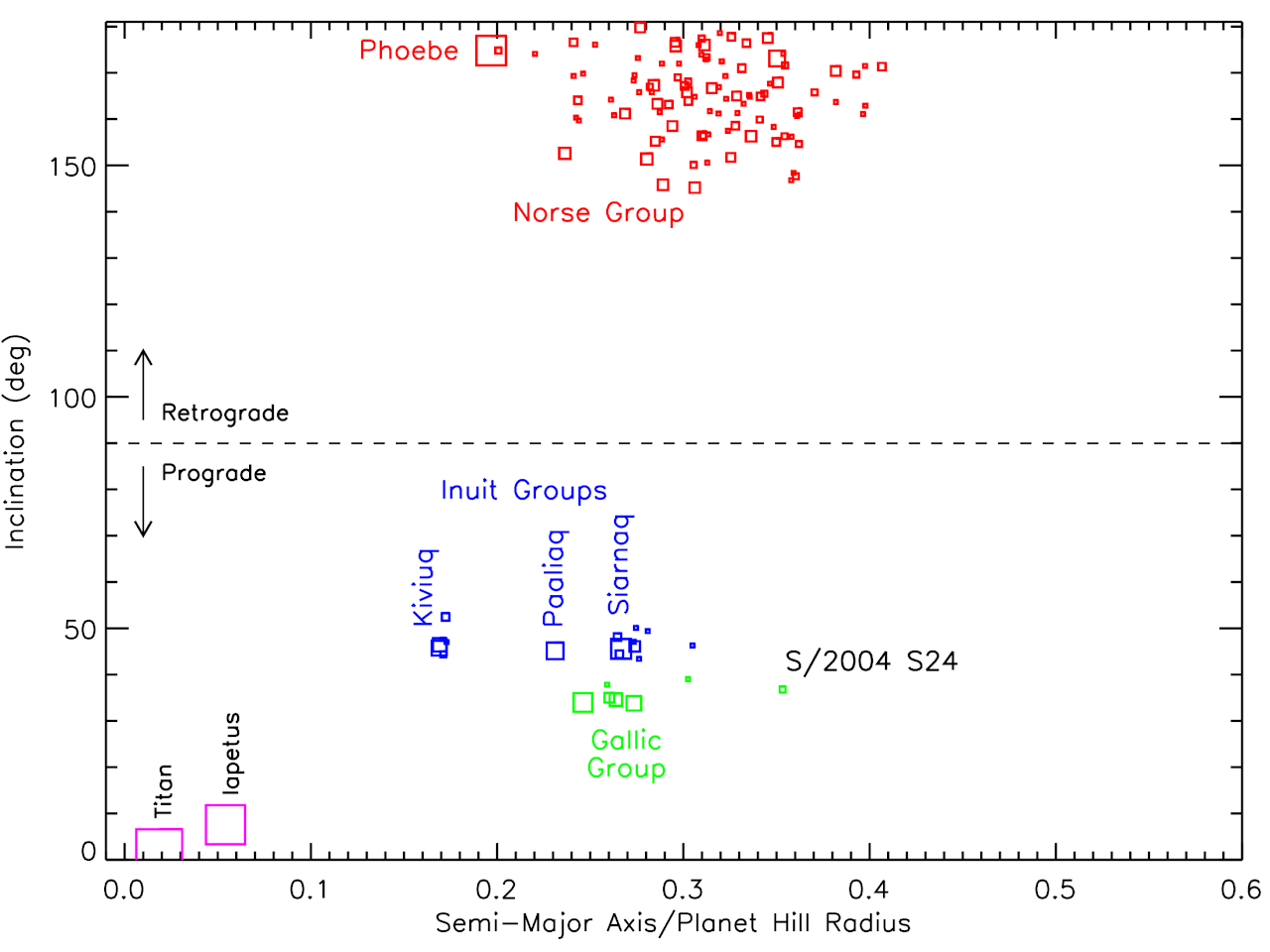
Diagram illustrating the orbits of the irregular satellites of Saturn, showing the three Inuit subgroups. The inclination and semi-major axis are represented on the Y and X-axis, respectively. The satellites with inclinations below 90° are prograde, those above 90° are retrograde. The X-axis is labeled in terms of Saturn's Hill radius.

The Inuit group (or family or cluster; also referred to as the second inclination group or the 46° inclination cluster) is a dynamical grouping of prograde irregular satellites of Saturn which follow similar orbits. Although almost all irregular moons are believed to have originated from a captured asteroid that later got involved in a collision, it is not currently known whether all the members in the Inuit group originated from a single progenitor, though the moons with measured colours appear similar to each other. Within the Inuit group, there are three clusterings or subgroups, each associated with a moon (Kiviuq, Paaliaq, and Siarnaq) and a distinct semi-major axis. It is unclear how a collisional family could have ended up with as large of a spread in semi-major axis as the Inuit group is, however, the probability of three unrelated clusters having a similar inclination by coincidence is low.

The International Astronomical Union (IAU) uses names taken from Inuit mythology for these moons, though only five of them have names at present.

== Characteristics ==
The group appeared quite homogeneous in early observations, the satellites displaying light-red colour (colour indices B−V = 0.79 and V−R = 0.51, similar to that of the Gallic group) and similar infrared spectra. Later observations, however, revealed that Ijiraq is distinctly redder than Paaliaq, Siarnaq and Kiviuq. In addition, unlike the other three, Ijiraq's spectrum does not display weak absorption near 0.7 μm. This feature is attributed to a possible water hydration.

The spectral homogeneity (with the exception of Ijiraq) is consistent with a common origin in the break-up of a single object but the dispersion of the orbital parameters requires further explanation. Secular resonances among the members could provide the explanation of the post-collisional dispersion.

The Inuit group members have semi-major axes range between 11 and 19 million km, their inclinations between 43° and 51°, and their eccentricities between 0.08 and 0.39. They take an average of 2 years to orbit Saturn. There are 39 moons total, of which 23 reside in the Kiviuq subgroup and 15 in the Siarnaq subgroup. The Kiviuq subgroup is a confirmed collisional family and their semi-major axes are lower and range between 11 million km and 13 million km, inclinations between 44° and 51°, and have higher eccentricities between 0.25 and 0.39. The Siarnaq subgroup has 15 members and have higher semi-major axes between 17 million km and 19 million km, inclinations between 43° and 49°, and eccentricities between 0.08 and 0.31. Paaliaq is by itself and orbits at a distance in between the two other subgroups.

== List ==
The 39 known members of the Inuit group are (sorted by date announcement):

Name	Diameter (Km)	Semi-Major Axis (Km)	Period (days)	Subgroup
Paaliaq	30	14997900	686.94	Paaliaq
Siarnaq	39.3	17881100	895.58	Siarnaq
Kiviuq	19	11307500	449.13	Kiviuq
Ijiraq	15	11344600	451.43	Kiviuq
Tarqeq	7	17751000	884.99	Siarnaq
S/2004 S 31	5	17497200	866.09	Siarnaq
S/2019 S 1	5	11245400	445.51	Kiviuq
S/2020 S 1	4	11338600	451.10	Kiviuq
S/2020 S 3	3	18057200	908.19	Siarnaq
S/2020 S 5	3	18391400	933.89	Siarnaq
S/2019 S 6	4	18205500	919.71	Siarnaq
S/2005 S 4	5	11324500	450.22	Kiviuq
S/2019 S 14	4	17853200	893.14	Siarnaq
S/2004 S 54	4	11277500	447.14	Kiviuq
S/2004 S 55	3	11294700	448.16	Kiviuq
S/2004 S 58	5	18254500	920.80	Siarnaq
S/2005 S 6	4	18107300	909.58	Siarnaq
S/2006 S 23	3	18269700	921.86	Siarnaq
S/2007 S 10	4	11364900	452.36	Kiviuq
S/2019 S 22	3	11305100	448.48	Kiviuq
S/2019 S 23	3	11310200	449.08	Kiviuq
S/2019 S 24	4	11360500	452.07	Kiviuq
S/2019 S 25	4	11329400	450.22	Kiviuq
S/2019 S 26	3	11390900	453.89	Kiviuq
S/2019 S 32	5	17960500	898.71	Siarnaq
S/2020 S 11	3	11295600	448.21	Kiviuq
S/2020 S 12	3	11314500	449.33	Kiviuq
S/2020 S 13	3	11415600	455.39	Kiviuq
S/2020 S 19	3	17726700	881.04	Siarnaq
S/2023 S 1	3	11205400	442.86	Kiviuq
S/2023 S 2	3	11309900	449.05	Kiviuq
S/2023 S 3	3	17646400	875.00	Siarnaq
S/2023 S 6	3	11953100	487.91	Kiviuq
S/2023 S 7	4	12133700	499.01	Kiviuq
S/2023 S 19	3	17590300	870.92	Siarnaq
S/2023 S 22	4	18577500	945.37	Siarnaq
S/2020 S 48	3	11355100	451.75	Kiviuq
S/2023 S 56	3	11287500	447.75	Kiviuq
S/2020 S 49	2	11305900	448.84	Kiviuq

== See also ==
- List of natural satellites
