= The Paper Bag Princess =

Book by Robert Munsch

- Paperback cover
- Author: Robert Munsch
- Illustrator: Michael Martchenko
- Cover artist: Michael Martchenko
- Language: English
- Publisher: Annick Press; Discus Books
- Publication date: 1980
- Publication place: Canada
- Pages: 32

The Paper Bag Princess is a children's book written by Robert Munsch and illustrated by Michael Martchenko. It was first published in 1980 by Annick Press and launched Munsch's career to the forefront of a new wave of Canadian children's authors. The story reverses the princess and dragon stereotype. As a result, it has won critical acclaim from feminists, including an endorsement from the National Organization for Women, which sells the book on its website. Since it was first published in 1980 it has sold more than seven million copies worldwide.

== Plot ==
Princess Elizabeth's plans to marry Prince Ronald are thwarted when a fire-breathing dragon kidnaps the prince, destroying her castle and clothes in the process. Elizabeth dons a paper bag, the only garment not scorched by the dragon’s fire, and pursues the dragon. She tricks the dragon into tiring himself out by breathing fire and flying around the world. After the dragon falls asleep, Elizabeth rescues Ronald, but the prince proves ungrateful for her bravery, mocking her appearance and telling her to return when she looks more like a princess. Elizabeth rebukes Ronald for his ingratitude, breaks off their engagement and dances off into the sunset.

== Analysis ==
=== Feminist themes ===
The Paper Bag Princess has garnered acclaim from feminist movements and scholars for its reversal of the princess and the dragon archetype. This acclaim has led some to place Munsch within the movement of second wave feminism as his picture book offers alternatives to the typical gender roles in place when it was published. These alternatives to the gender binary include both the dress of the characters and the larger plot in which the princess is the rescuer. Elizabeth's quest to save Ronald from the dragon, wearing nothing but a paper bag, shows her courage and empowers her in her rejection of Ronald. A study performed by sociologist Bronwyn Davies among preschool children revealed their capability to associate Elizabeth’s narrative with the agency and independence of women outside of traditional gender dynamics.

=== Pedagogical significance ===
The Paper Bag Princess has also been used as a literary example for introducing children to the elements of storytelling and critical literacy. A research study performed by teachers Maria Colleen Cruz and Kate Pollock reveal that the novel contains essential elements of the fantasy genre that are easily comprehensible to young readers. The Paper Bag Princess has also been used as an instructional tool for critical literacy as it challenges gender roles and offers an alternative narrative to gender dynamics.

== Reception ==
The Paper Bag Princess was received well by audiences. It sold 10,000 copies in its first year. By 2019 it had sold more the seven million copies worldwide. The Paper Bag Princess launched Munsch's career to stardom.

== Editions ==
=== 25th Anniversary ===
The Paper Bag Princess 25th Anniversary Edition: The Story Behind the Story (2005), a full-color hardback, reveals the inspiration behind the book. It features an interview and behind-the scenes with the author, and offers a look at the book's impact around the world.

=== Film ===
There are plans for a movie adaptation produced by Margot Robbie and Elizabeth Banks, and directed by Banks.

=== Television adaptation ===
"The Paper Bag Princess"
- A Bunch of Munsch episode
- Episode no.: Episode 2
- Directed by: Craig Wilson
- Written by: Robert Munsch (original); Michel Choquette; Alan Annand; Cheryl Blakeney (adapted)
- Story by: Craig Wilson; Robert Clark (storyboard); Peter Landecker (story writer)
- Based on: The Paper Bag Princess (book)
- Narrated by: Robert Munsch (original)
- Production code: 102
- Original air dates: October 14, 1992 (Showtime); November 28, 1993 (CTV)

Episode chronology
← Previous "50 Below Zero"	Next → "David's Father"

In 1992, the book was also adapted into a cartoon, as part of the animated series A Bunch of Munsch. which originally aired on Showtime in the United States on October 14, 1992, for the Showtime's Fall 1992 lineup opposite of the series debut of American Heroes & Legends, as part of the network's hour long block of kiddie-oriented programming, and then on CTV in Canada on November 28, 1993.

=== YouTube ===
Editions of Munsch personally reading the story were also uploaded onto platforms such as YouTube, however, the publisher had them removed after filing a copyright claim with YouTube.

=== Interactive ===
In 2013, Adri wrote an interactive fiction game based on the book.
