= Giant or Waiting for the Thursday Boat =

1989 book by Robert Munsch

- Author: Robert Munsch
- Illustrator: Gilles Tibo
- Cover artist: Gilles Tibo
- Language: English
- Publisher: Annick Press
- Publication date: 1989
- Publication place: Canada
- Pages: 32

Giant or Waiting for the Thursday Boat is a children's book by Canadian author Robert Munsch and illustrated by Gilles Tibo, first published in 1989 by Annick Press. Due to depictions of the Judeo-Christian-Islamic God as a little African American girl, as well as threats of violence against God by the titular Giant, it was challenged or removed from school libraries in Canada.

== Plot ==
McKeon, the last Giant in Ireland, is upset at Saint Patrick driving out not only the snakes, but also elves, giants, and all the other mythical creatures. In retaliation, McKeon begins throwing church bells into the ocean. Saint Patrick, upset, tells McKeon to take up his issue with God who will be arriving "on the Thursday boat". McKeon sits down to wait, but the first craft that arrives is a small boat carrying a little girl. Deciding that this cannot be God, McKeon invites her to sit with him as he waits. Other boats arrive, but none of them are carrying God. Upset, he takes the little girl and leaps straight into Heaven. There, he confronts Saint Patrick and the two go searching for God to settle the dispute. Eventually the little girl reveals herself as the Almighty, and states that inside her house there is more than enough room for "giants, elves, snakes, saints, and church bells."

== Reception ==
Although the book has received a re-evaluation by modern readers, critics at the time of publication were less kind, with Judith Saltman putting it bluntly "This is not one of [Munsch's] better books." It is the only one of his books that was out of print as of 2021.

== Challenges ==
Shortly after the book's publication, several school districts in Ontario, Canada banned the book for use in grades K-3 citing the religious themes, particularly that God was represented as a little girl, as well as McKeon's threats of violence towards God. However, as of early 2016, Giant is not currently listed as a challenged book in Canada.
