= Glenview Park Secondary School =

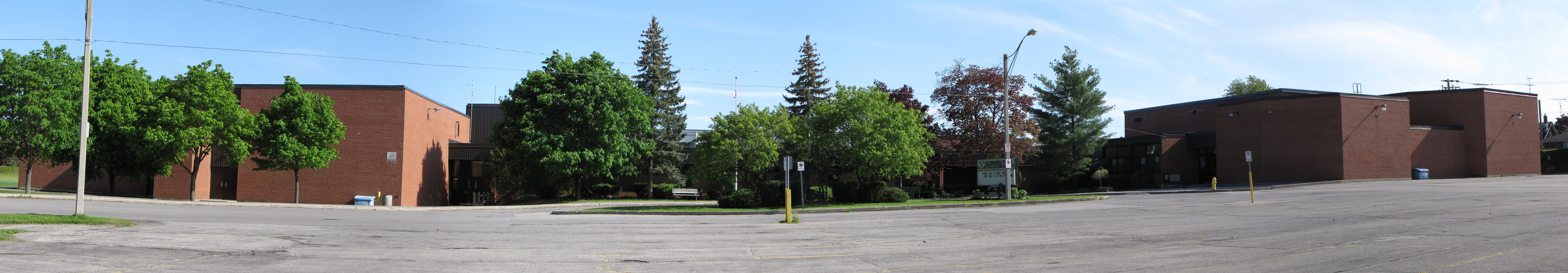

Location
- 55 McKay Street; Cambridge, Ontario, N1R 4G6; Canada; 43.34607°N 80.30712°W

Information
- School type: High School
- Motto: Per Ardua Scientia
- Founded: 1957
- School board: Waterloo Region District School Board
- Superintendent: Angela Mercier
- School number: 0745618
- Principal: Beverly Wood
- Grades: 9-12
- Enrollment: 980 (November 2025)
- Language: English
- Area: South Galt
- Colours: Red, Black, and White
- Mascot: Panther
- Team name: Glenview Panthers

Glenview Park Secondary School is a high school in Cambridge, Ontario, Canada, for students in South Galt. The school was established in 1957 and is also one of the two International Baccalaureate (IB) Schools in Waterloo Region.

== Sports teams ==
Glenview is known as the Panthers when playing sports, representing the colours of Black, White & Red. However they are sometimes referred to as Glenview Panthers or Glenview, especially when against Preston High School who are also known as the Panthers.

== Notable alumni ==
- Rob Ducey, major league baseball player
- Scott Walker; played in the NHL
- The Reklaws, country music sibling duo Stuart and Jenna Walker
- Michael Martchenko, illustrator
- Rylee Foster, soccer player

== See also ==
- Education in Ontario
- List of secondary schools in Ontario
