= S/2004 S 31 =

Moon of Saturn

Discovery
- Discovered by: Sheppard et al.
- Discovery date: 2019

Designations
- Alternative names: T522499

Orbital characteristics
- Semi-major axis: 17402800 km
- Eccentricity: 0.242
- Orbital period (sidereal): 853.80 days
- Inclination: 48.11°
- Satellite of: Saturn
- Group: Inuit group (Siarnaq)

Physical characteristics
- Mean diameter: 4 km
- Apparent magnitude: 24.9
- Absolute magnitude (H): 15.6

S/2004 S 31 is a natural satellite of Saturn and a member of the Inuit group. Its discovery was announced by Scott S. Sheppard, David C. Jewitt, and Jan Kleyna on October 8, 2019 from observations taken between December 12, 2004 and March 22, 2007.

S/2004 S 31 is about 4 kilometres in diameter, and orbits Saturn at an average distance of 17.568 million km in 869.65 days, at an inclination of 48.8° to the ecliptic, with an eccentricity of 0.240. The satellite is affected by the Kozai mechanism, and is noted to be the first known moon whose argument of periapsis oscillates around 270°.
