= Robert Munsch =

Canadian children's author (born 1945)

Robert Munsch CM
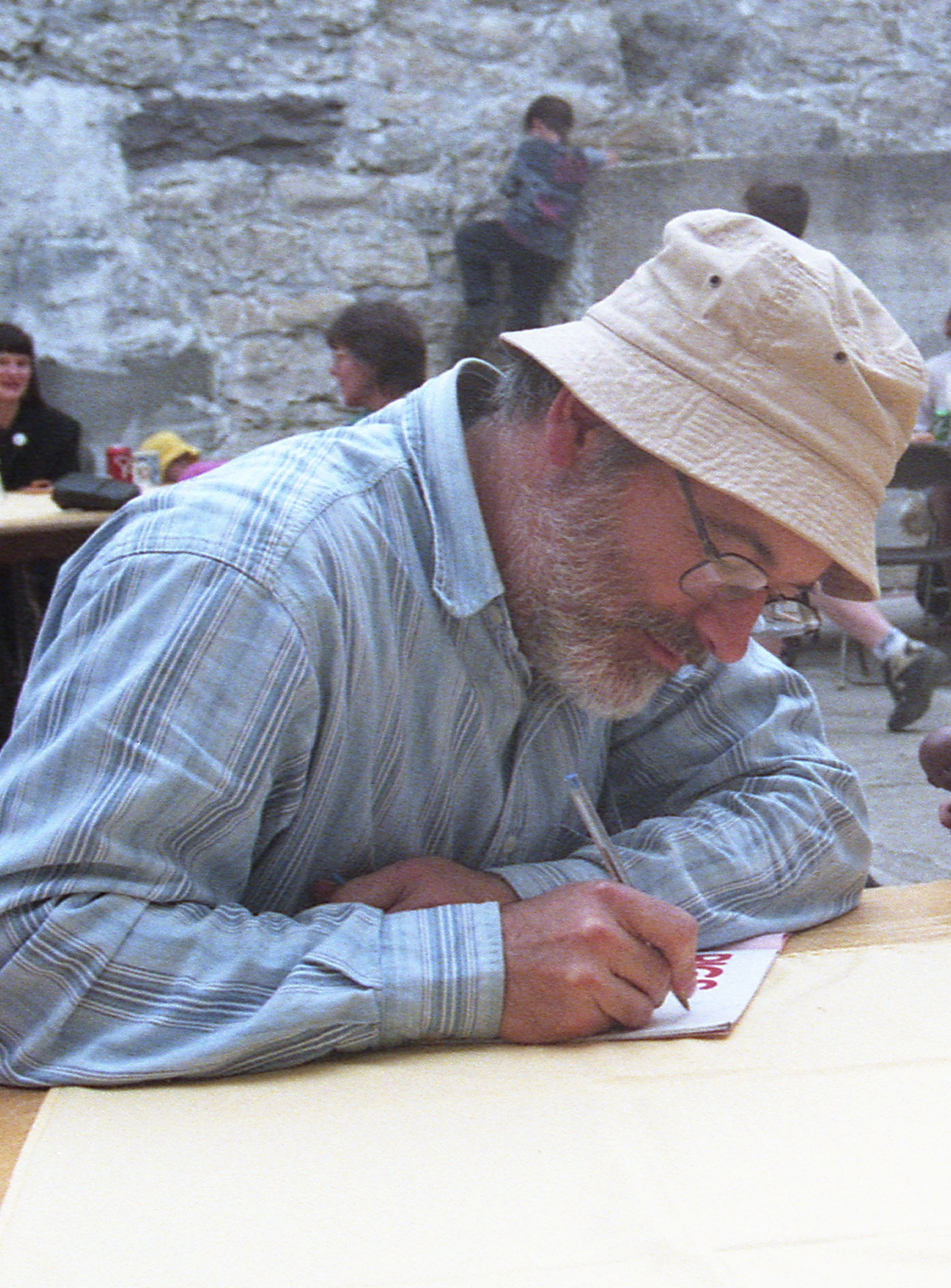
- Munsch in 1997
- Born: June 11, 1945 (age 81); Pittsburgh, Pennsylvania, U.S.
- Education: Fordham University (BA); Boston University (MA); Tufts University (ME); University of Guelph
- Occupation: Author
- Children: 3
- Writing career
- Period: 1979–2024
- Genre: Children's literature
- Notable works: The Paper Bag Princess; Love You Forever
- Website: www.robertmunsch.com

Robert Norman Munsch CM (born June 11, 1945) is an American-born Canadian children's author. Born in Pittsburgh, Pennsylvania, he moved to Canada in 1975 to work at the University of Guelph. His unique storytelling style comes from interactively developing stories with children, taking events from their lives and experience and greatly exaggerating them into the realm of the ridiculous and sometimes fantastical. He has received a Juno Award, induction into the Order of Canada, a star in Canada's Walk of Fame, and has two public schools in Ontario named after him. His books have sold millions of copies, and he has the dubious honour of being the most stolen author in the Toronto Public Library system.

== Early life and education ==
Robert Munsch was born in Pittsburgh, Pennsylvania, on June 11, 1945. He grew up in a family of nine children. Munsch graduated from Fordham University in 1969 with a Bachelor of Arts degree in history and from Boston University in 1971 with a Master of Arts degree in anthropology.

== Career ==
When Munsch was 18, he studied to become a Jesuit priest in Westchester County, New York. After volunteering at an orphanage as part of his training, he decided he would rather work with children. He studied early childhood education at Tufts University. Upon graduating in 1973, he worked at a day care in Jamaica Plain neighborhood of Boston, and learned that he could "get the kids to shut up during nap time by telling them stories". At the job he met his future wife, Ann, while changing a diaper. He moved to Canada in 1975 to work at the Family Studies department at the University of Guelph in Ontario. In Guelph, he was encouraged to publish the many stories he made up for the children he worked with.

One of Munsch's best-known books, Love You Forever, was listed fourth on the 2001 Publishers Weekly All-Time Bestselling Children's Books list for paperbacks at 6.97 million copies (not including the 1.049 million hardcover copies). It has since sold over 30 million copies and has been featured on the episode "The One with the Cake" from the NBC television show Friends, as well as being mentioned by talk show host Oprah Winfrey on Late Night with David Letterman as being her favourite children's book. Munsch's other famous book, the feminist themed The Paper Bag Princess, has sold over seven million copies and is considered a literary classic.

=== Storytelling performances ===
Munsch is known for his exuberant storytelling methods, with exaggerated expressions and acted voices. He considers himself a storyteller who sometimes wrote things down. The stories he published were made up in front of audiences and refined them through repeated tellings. Across Munsch's stories, the characters are based on the children to whom he first told the story, including his own children. Munsch often performed at children's festivals and appears at elementary schools, sometimes unannounced.

In 1991, some of his books were adapted into an animated TV series A Bunch of Munsch, made in Montreal and airing on pay TV channels.

== Personal life ==
Munsch and his wife, Ann, have been married since the early 1970s. They were unable to have biological children, and two pregnancies ended in stillbirths. The couple has three children via adoption.

Munsch has obsessive–compulsive disorder and bipolar disorder. In August 2008, he suffered a stroke that temporarily affected his ability to speak. In 2009, he revealed that he was in recovery for alcoholism and a cocaine addiction that had started in 2005, and at the time of the announcement he was four months sober.

In October 2021, Munsch announced that he had been diagnosed with dementia. He received approval for medical assistance in dying in September 2025 after applying five years prior, following his diagnosis. His daughter clarified that the approval did not mean his death was imminent. In December 2025, Munsch revealed that he had about 50 unpublished stories, and hopes to release one per year following his death.

== Awards and honours ==
In 1985, Munsch won a Juno Award for his portrayal of "Murmel, Murmel, Munsch: More Outrageous Stories". In 1992, he was also chosen "Author of the Year" by the Canadian Booksellers' Association. In 1999, Munsch was made a Member of the Order of Canada. On June 17, 2009, it was announced that Munsch would receive a star on Canada's Walk of Fame in Toronto. The induction ceremony was held on September 12, 2009, and in 2013, his star was revealed on King Street in Toronto. Two public schools in Ontario are named after Munsch: the Robert Munsch Public School in Whitby, Ontario, and the Robert Munsch Public School in Mount Albert, Ontario. Munsch was awarded an honorary doctorate by the University of Guelph in 2000.

== Publications ==
Year	Title	Illustrator	ISBN	Publisher	Notes
1979	Mud Puddle	Sami Suomalainen	1-5503-7468-0	Annick Press	
1979	The Dark	Sami Suomalainen; 1997 edition illustrated by Michael Martchenko	1-5503-7450-8	Annick Press	
1980	The Paper Bag Princess	Michael Martchenko	0-9202-3616-2	Annick Press	One of the books adapted into an episode in A Bunch of Munsch
1981	Jonathan Cleaned Up — Then He Heard a Sound (also known as Blackberry Subway Jam)	Michael Martchenko	0-920236-21-9	Annick Press	One of the books adapted into an episode in A Bunch of Munsch. Also adapted into a 1984 short film by the National Film Board of Canada.
1982	Murmel Murmel Murmel	Michael Martchenko	1-5503-7012-X	Annick Press	One of the books adapted into an episode in A Bunch of Munsch
1982	The Boy in the Drawer	Michael Martchenko	0-920303-50-1	Annick Press	One of the books adapted into an episode in A Bunch of Munsch
1983	The Fire Station	Michael Martchenko	1-5503-7171-1	Annick Press	One of the books adapted into an episode in A Bunch of Munsch
1983	David's Father	Michael Martchenko	1-55037-011-1	Annick Press	One of the books adapted into an episode in A Bunch of Munsch
1984	Millicent and the Wind	Suzanne Duranceau	0-9202-3693-6	Annick Press	
1985	Mortimer	Michael Martchenko	0-9203-0311-0	Annick Press	One of the books adapted into an episode in A Bunch of Munsch
1985	Thomas' Snowsuit	Michael Martchenko	1-5545-1115-1	Annick Press	One of the books adapted into an episode in A Bunch of Munsch
1986	50 Below Zero	Michael Martchenko	0-9202-3691-X	Annick Press	One of the books adapted into an episode in A Bunch of Munsch
1986	Love You Forever	Sheila McGraw	0-9206-6837-2	Firefly Books	
1987	Moira's Birthday	Michael Martchenko		Annick Press	One of the books adapted into an episode in A Bunch of Munsch
1987	I Have To Go!	Michael Martchenko	0-9203-0351-X	Annick Press	
1988	Angela's Airplane	Michael Martchenko	0-9202-3675-8	Annick Press	One of the books adapted into an episode in A Bunch of Munsch
1988	A Promise is a Promise (co-authored with Michael Kusugak)	Vladyana Krykorka		Annick Press	
1989	Giant; or Waiting for the Thursday Boat	Gilles Tibo		Annick Press	
1989	Pigs!	Michael Martchenko	1-5503-7388-9	Annick Press	One of the books adapted into an episode in A Bunch of Munsch
1990	Something Good	Michael Martchenko	1-55037-390-0	Annick Press	One of the books adapted into an episode in A Bunch of Munsch
1991	Good Families Don't	Alan Daniel		Doubleday	
1991	Show and Tell	Michael Martchenko		Annick Press	
1992	Get Me Another One	Shawn Steffler; 2019 edition illustrated by Mike Boldt		Doubleday	
1992	Purple, Green and Yellow	Hélène Desputeaux	1-5545-1113-5	Annick Press	
1993	Wait and See	Michael Martchenko		Annick Press	
1994	Where is Gah-Ning?	Hélène Desputeaux		Annick Press	
1995	From Far Away (co-authored with Saoussan Askar)	Michael Martchenko; 2017 edition illustrated by Rebecca Green		Annick Press	
1996	Stephanie's Ponytail	Michael Martchenko	1-5545-1114-3	Annick Press	
1997	Alligator Baby	Michael Martchenko		Cartwheel	
1998	Get Out of Bed	Alan Daniel & Lea Daniel		Cartwheel	
1998	Andrew's Loose Tooth	Michael Martchenko		Cartwheel	
1999	We Share EVERYTHING!	Michael Martchenko		Cartwheel	
2000	Aaron's Hair	Alan Daniel & Lea Daniel		Cartwheel	
2000	Mmm, Cookies	Michael Martchenko	0-5905-1694-9	Cartwheel	
2001	Up, Up, Down	Michael Martchenko	0-4399-8815-2	Cartwheel	
2001	Makeup Mess	Michael Martchenko	978-0-4399-8896-4	Cartwheel	
2002	More Pies	Michael Martchenko	978-0-7791-1363-7	Cartwheel	
2002	Playhouse	Michael Martchenko	978-0-4399-8959-6	Cartwheel	
2002	Ribbon Rescue	Eugenie Fernandes	0-5900-3871-0	Cartwheel	
2003	Lighthouse	Janet Wilson	978-0-4399-4656-8	Cartwheel	
2003	Zoom	Michael Martchenko		Cartwheel	
2004	Boo!	Michael Martchenko	978-0-4399-6126-4	Cartwheel	
2004	Smelly Socks	Michael Martchenko	978-0-4399-6707-5	Cartwheel	
2005	The Sandcastle Contest	Michael Martchenko	978-0-4399-5590-4	Cartwheel	
2006	Deep Snow	Michael Martchenko	978-0-4399-4658-2	Scholastic	
2006	I'm So Embarrassed!	Michael Martchenko	978-0-4399-5239-2	Cartwheel	
2006	No Clean Clothes	Michael Martchenko	0-4399-3790-6	Scholastic	
2007	Class Clown	Michael Martchenko		Scholastic	
2008	Just One Goal!	Michael Martchenko	0-5459-9035-1	Scholastic	
2008	Look at Me!	Michael Martchenko		Scholastic	
2008	Kiss Me, I'm Perfect!	Michael Martchenko		Cartwheel	
2008	The Ocean Goes on Forever	Jay Odjick			Originally published only in Ojibway. Published in English and French in Munsch Mania compilation
2009	Down the Drain	Michael Martchenko	0-5459-8600-1	Scholastic	
2009	Roar!	Michael Martchenko	0-545-98020-8	Scholastic	
2009	Braids!	Dave Whamond	978-1-4431-5739-1	Scholastic	
2010	Put Me in a Book	Michael Martchenko	1-4431-0080-3	Scholastic	
2010	Too Much Stuff!	Michael Martchenko	978-1-4431-0245-2	Scholastic	
2011	Moose!	Michael Martchenko	1-4431-0718-2	Scholastic	One of the books later became a Holiday Special television series.
2011	Give Me Back My Dad!	Michael Martchenko	1-4431-0764-6	Scholastic	
2011	Neversink School and Other Silly Poems	Michael Martchenko	1-4431-1335-2	Scholastic	
2012	Finding Christmas	Michael Martchenko		Scholastic	
2012	It's My Room!	Michael Martchenko		Scholastic	
2013	Seeing Red!	Michael Martchenko	1-4431-2446-X	Scholastic	
2013	Swamp Water	Michael Martchenko	978-1-4431-2837-7	Scholastic	
2014	Hugs	Michael Martchenko		Scholastic	
2014	Pyjama Day!	Michael Martchenko	978-1-4431-3917-5	Scholastic	
2015	Ready, Set, Go!	Michael Martchenko	978-1-4431-4657-9	Scholastic	
2016	So Much Snow!	Michael Martchenko	1-4431-4617-X	Scholastic	
2017	Blackflies	Jay Odjick	978-1-4431-5791-9	Scholastic	
2017	The Enormous Suitcase	Michael Martchenko	978-1-4431-6318-7	Scholastic	
2018	Moving Day!	Michael Martchenko	978-1-4431-6399-6	Scholastic	
2019	Sounds Like Christmas	Michael Martchenko	978-1-0397-0170-0	Scholastic	
2019	Bear for Breakfast	Jay Odjick	978-1-4431-7054-3	Scholastic	
2019	School Rules!	Dave Whamond	978-1-4431-8202-7	Scholastic	
2020	Teamwork	Michael Martchenko	1-4431-8269-9	Scholastic	
2021	I Can Fix It!	Michael Martchenko	1-4431-9212-0	Scholastic	
2021	Think Big!	Dave Whamond	1-4431-8298-2	Scholastic	
2022	Leaves!	Michael Martchenko	978-1-4431-9664-2	Scholastic	
2023	Class Trip	Michael Martchenko	978-1-0397-0224-0	Scholastic	
2024	Bounce!	Michael Martchenko	978-1-0397-1004-7	Scholastic	
2025	The Perfect Paper Airplane	Michael Martchenko	978-1-0397-1518-9	Scholastic	

== Compilations ==
Year	Title	ISBN	Stories Included
1998	Munschworks: The First Munsch Collection	978-1-5503-7523-7	The Paper Bag Princess • I Have to Go! • David's Father • The Fire Station • Thomas' Snowsuit
1999	Munschworks 2: The Second Munsch Treasury	978-1-5503-7553-4	Pigs • Purple, Green and Yellow • Mortimer • Murmel, Murmel, Murmel • Something Good
2000	Munschworks 3: The Third Munsch Treasury	978-1-5503-7633-3	Stephanie's Ponytail • Angela's Airplane • Jonathan Cleaned Up - Then He Heard a Sound • Show and Tell • A Promise Is a Promise
2001	Munschworks Grand Treasury	978-1-5503-7685-2	The Paper Bag Princess • The Fire Station • I Have to Go! • David's Father • Thomas' Snowsuit • Pigs • Mortimer • Purple, Green and Yellow • Murmel, Murmel, Murmel • Something Good • Stephanie's Ponytail • Angela's Airplane • Jonathan Cleaned Up - Then He Heard a Sound • Show and Tell • A Promise Is a Promise
2002	Munschworks 4: The Fourth Munsch Treasury	978-1-5503-7766-8	Moira's Birthday • From Far Away • 50 Below Zero • The Boy in the Drawer • Millicent and the Wind
2004	Munsch More!	978-0-439-96135-6	Alligator Baby • Andrew's Loose Tooth • Get Out of Bed • Mmm, Cookies! • Ribbon Rescue • Deep Snow
2006	Murmel Murmel Munsch! (audio CD)	1-8971-6627-3	Mud Puddle • Pigs! • Boo! • Kendro's Braids • Squished Squash • I'm So Embarrassed! • Lacey's Kiss • Murmel, Murmel, Murmel • Flowers on My Jeans • Andrew's Loose Tooth • Something Good • Victoria's Lunch • Makeup Mess • Zoom!
2007	Much More Munsch!	978-0-4399-3571-5	We Share Everything! • Aaron's Hair • Up, Up, Down • Makeup Mess • Playhouse • Collection of poems
2010	Mad About Munsch!	978-1-4431-0239-1	More Pies! • Zoom! • Smelly Socks • Boo! • The Sandcastle Contest • Braids
2010	Munsch Mini-Treasury One	978-1-5545-1273-7	Angela's Airplane • The Paper Bag Princess • 50 Below Zero • Pigs • A Promise Is a Promise
2010	Munsch Mini-Treasury Two	978-1-5545-1274-4	Stephanie's Ponytail • The Fire Station • I Have to Go! • Moira's Birthday • Thomas' Snowsuit
2013	Munsch Mania!	978-1-4431-2826-1	Class Clown • I'm So Embarrassed! • Just One Goal! • Look at Me! • No Clean Clothes • The Ocean Goes on Forever
2014	Munsch Mini-Treasury Three	978-1-5545-1651-3	David's Father • Mortimer • Purple, Green and Yellow • Show and Tell • Something Good
2019	Marvellous Munsch!	978-1-4431-4863-4	Down the Drain! • Put Me in a Book! • Too Much Stuff! • Moose! • Give Me Back My Dad! • Hugs
2020	A Bunch of Munsch!	978-1-4431-8264-5	Pyjama Day! • Seeing Red • Swamp Water • It’s My Room! • Roar! • Blackflies
2023	Munsch-a-thon!	978-1-0397-0178-6	Ready, Set, Go! • So Much Snow! • The Enormous Suitcase • Get Me Another One! • Moving Day! • Bear for Breakfast
2023	5 Tremendously Silly Munsch Stories	978-1-7732-1817-5	The Paper Bag Princess • Angela's Airplane • Thomas' Snowsuit • Stephanie's Ponytail • Show and Tell
2024	The Big Green Book of Munsch Books	978-1-7732-1922-6	The Paper Bag Princess • David's Father • Purple, Green and Yellow • 50 Below Zero • I Have to Go!
2025	The Big Red Book of Munsch Books	978-1-8340-2005-1	Pigs • Angela's Airplane • Wait and See • The Fire Station • Jonathan Cleaned Up - Then He Heard a Sound
2025	5 Absolutely Outrageous Munsch Stories	978-1-7732-1939-4	Mortimer • Pigs • Something Good • Moira's Birthday • The Boy in the Drawer
2026	5 Extraordinarily Zany Munsch Stories	978-1-8340-2028-0	Murmel, Murmel, Murmel • I Have to Go! • The Fire Station • Wait and See • David's Father
2026	The Big Blue Book of Munsch Books	978-1-8340-2162-1	Mortimer • Stephanie's Ponytail • A Promise is a Promise • Show and Tell • Millicent and the Wind
