= Tarqeq =

Moon of Saturn

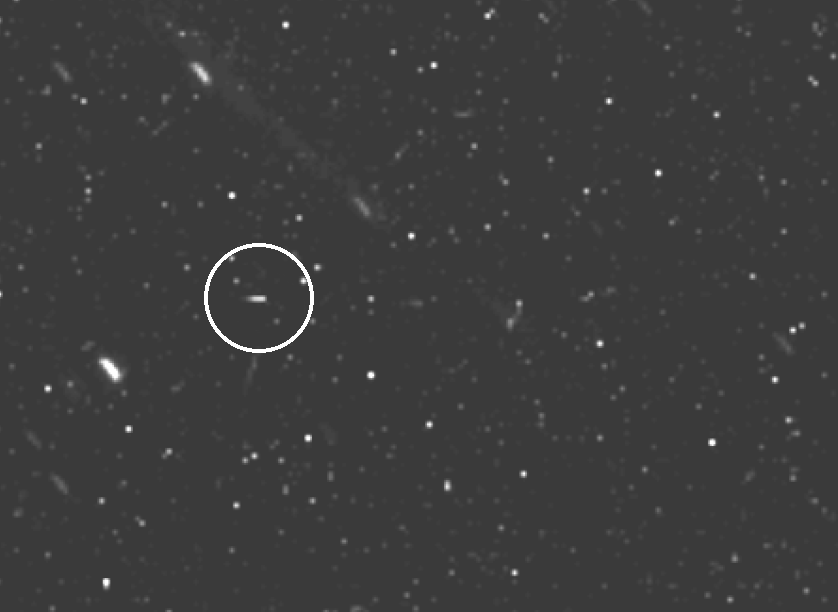
- Tarqeq imaged by the Cassini spacecraft in June 2016

Discovery
- Discovered by: Scott S. Sheppard; David C. Jewitt; Jan Kleyna; Brian G. Marsden
- Discovery date: 13 April 2007

Designations
- Designation: Saturn LII
- Pronunciation: /ˈtɑːrkɛk/
- Named after: Tarqiup Inua
- Alternative names: S/2007 S 1
- Adjectives: Tarqiupian, Tarqeqian (Note: The genitive form of Tarqeq is Tarqiup (as in Tarqiup Inua 'Master of the Moon'). Thus the adjectival form could be absolutive Tarqeqian or genitive Tarqiupian, parallel to nominative Venusian and genitive Venerian for Venus. See Inuktitut morphology)

Orbital characteristics
- Epoch 2007 Apr. 10.0
- Semi-major axis: 17.9106 million km
- Eccentricity: 0.1081
- Orbital period (sidereal): 894.86 d
- Inclination: 49.90°
- Satellite of: Saturn
- Group: Inuit group (Siarnaq)

Physical characteristics
- Mean diameter: 6+50% −30% km
- Synodic rotation period: 76.13±0.01 h
- Albedo: 0.06 (assumed)
- Spectral type: B–R = 1.37 ± 0.06
- Apparent magnitude: 23.9
- Absolute magnitude (H): 14.8

Tarqeq, also known as Saturn LII (provisional designation S/2007 S 1), is a natural satellite of Saturn. Its discovery was announced by Scott S. Sheppard, David C. Jewitt, Jan Kleyna, and Brian G. Marsden on 13 April 2007 from observations taken between 5 January 2006 and 22 March 2007. It is named after Tarqeq, the Inuit moon god, and is a member of the Inuit group of irregular satellites. It is about six kilometres in diameter. The Cassini spacecraft observed Tarqeq over 1.5 days on 15–16 January 2014.

The Tarqiupian (Tarqeqian) orbit lies at an inclination of 49.90° (to the ecliptic; 49.77° to Saturn's equator), with an eccentricity of 0.1081 and a semi-major axis of 17.9106 million km. Tarqeq orbits in a prograde direction with a period of 894.86 days.

Tarqeq is the slowest-rotating irregular moon measured by Cassini–Huygens, with a period of about 76.13±0.01 h and a roughly ellipsoidal shape. This is very close to a 1:5 resonance with Titan's orbital period, suggesting that gravitational interactions possibly lock Tarqeq in a mean-motion resonance.

It has very similar inclination and semi-major axis as Siarnaq, suggesting that it is a fragment of the latter.
