= S/2020 S 5 =

Moon of Saturn

Discovery
- Discovered by: E. Ashton, Brett J. Gladman
- Discovery date: 2020

Orbital characteristics
- Semi-major axis: 18,391,300 km (11,427,800 mi)
- Eccentricity: 0.220
- Orbital period (sidereal): 2.557 yrs (933.88 d)
- Inclination: 48.2° (to the ecliptic)
- Satellite of: Saturn
- Group: Inuit group (Siarnaq)

Physical characteristics
- Mean diameter: 3 km
- Absolute magnitude (H): 16.6

S/2020 S 5 is a natural satellite of Saturn. Its discovery was announced by Edward Ashton, Brett J. Gladman, Jean-Marc Petit and Mike Alexandersen on May 6, 2023 from observations taken between July 3, 2019 and July 9, 2021.

S/2020 S 5 is about 3 kilometers in diameter, and orbits Saturn at a distance of 18.422 million km in 933.52 days, at an inclination of 49.41°, orbits in a prograde direction and with an eccentricity of 0.135. S/2020 S 5 belongs to the Inuit group and it may be a Siarnaq fragment that broke off long ago, since it shares the same orbital elements.

The orbit of S/2020 S 5 librates in accordance with the von Zeipel–Lidov–Kozai effect.
