= Siarnaq =

Moon of Saturn

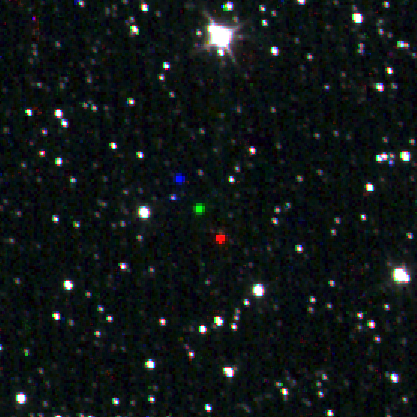
- Composite of three images taken by the Cassini spacecraft in 2013, showing Siarnaq's location at ten-minute intervals (Note: Merger of three images, colored red, green, and blue respectively, to highlight Siarnaq as it moves relative to the background stars.)

Discovery
- Discovered by: Brett J. Gladman et al. (Note: Brett J. Gladman, John J. Kavelaars, Jean-Marc Petit, Hans Scholl, Matthew Holman, Brian G. Marsden, Phil Nicholson and Joseph A. Burns.)
- Discovery site: Mauna Kea Obs.
- Discovery date: 23 September 2000

Designations
- Designation: Saturn XXIX
- Pronunciation: /ˈsiːɑːrnɑːk/
- Named after: Siarnaq (Inuit mythology)
- Alternative names: S/2000 S 3
- Adjectives: Siarnaupian, Siarnaqian (Note: The genitive form of Siarnaq is Siarnaup. Thus the adjectival form could be absolutive Siarnaqian or genitive Siarnaupian, parallel to nominative Venusian and genitive Venerian for Venus. See Inuktitut morphology)

Orbital characteristics
- Epoch 17 December 2020 (JD 2459200.5)
- Semi-major axis: 0.1187382 AU (17,763,000 km)
- Eccentricity: 0.5293834
- Orbital period (sidereal): +2.42 yr (+883.87 d)
- Mean anomaly: 35.08520°
- Inclination: 43.80073° (to ecliptic)
- Longitude of ascending node: 40.96116°
- Argument of perihelion: 79.59603°
- Satellite of: Saturn
- Group: Inuit group (Siarnaq)

Physical characteristics
- Mean diameter: 39.3±5.9 km
- Synodic rotation period: 10.18785±0.00005 h
- Pole ecliptic longitude: 98°±15°
- Pole ecliptic latitude: −23°±15°
- Albedo: 0.050±0.017
- Spectral type: D (reddish); B−V=0.87±0.01; V−R=0.48±0.01; V−I=1.03±0.01
- Apparent magnitude: 20.1 (visible)
- Absolute magnitude (H): 10.9±0.05

Siarnaq is the second-largest irregular moon of Saturn. It was discovered on 23 September 2000 by a team of astronomers led by Brett J. Gladman. It was named after the Inuit goddess of the sea, Siarnaq, who is more commonly known as Sedna. Siarnaq is the largest member of Saturn's Inuit group of prograde irregular moons, which orbit far from Saturn in the same direction as the planet's rotation. The moons of the Inuit group are believed to have originated as fragments from the collisional breakup of a larger progenitor moon after it was gravitationally captured into orbit around Saturn several billion years ago. Several other small Inuit group moons share similar orbits to Siarnaq, indicating that the moon had experienced another collision after forming from its progenitor.

== Discovery ==
Discovery images of Siarnaq taken by the CFHT in September 2000

Siarnaq was discovered on 23 September 2000, by an international team of astronomers consisting of Brett J. Gladman, John J. Kavelaars, Jean-Marc Petit, Hans Scholl, Matthew Holman, Brian G. Marsden, Phil Nicholson and Joseph A. Burns. The discovery of Siarnaq formed part of an observational campaign to search for distant irregular satellites around Saturn. The campaign was coordinated by Gladman in late 2000 using various ground-based telescopes equipped with sensitive CCD cameras to survey Saturn's Hill sphere, the region within which satellites can have stable orbits around the planet.

In September 2000, Gladman and collaborators conducted a wide-area survey around Saturn down to a R-band limiting magnitude of 24.5 with the 3.6-meter Canada-France-Hawaii Telescope (CFHT) at the Mauna Kea Observatory in Hawaii. They reobserved their previous irregular satellite discoveries from August 2000 (Ymir and Paaliaq) and identified two new irregular satellite candidates: Siarnaq and Tarvos. Siarnaq, the brighter of the two, was detected at an apparent magnitude of 20.

=== Follow-up and confirmation ===
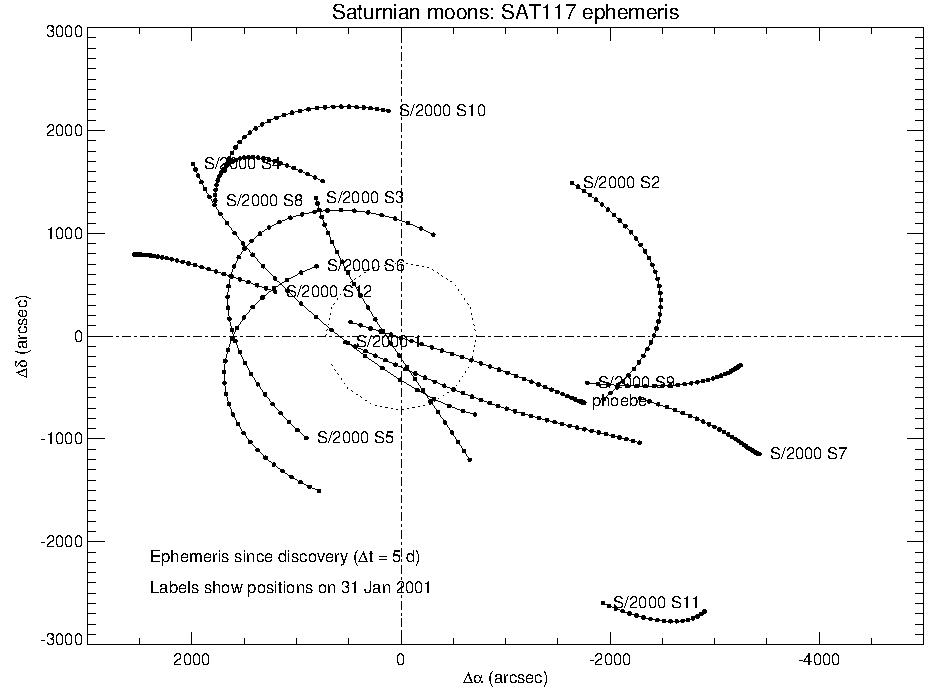
Offset plot showing the positions and ephemerides of 13 irregular satellites relative to Saturn in 2001. Siarnaq (S/2000 S 3) is located at the upper left from the center.

Between 25–29 September 2000, follow-up observations of Siarnaq and other newly-discovered Saturnian irregular satellites were made at various observatories. Preliminary orbit calculations ruled out the possibility that the satellites could be foreground asteroids and confirmed they were indeed orbiting Saturn. The discovery of Ymir, Paaliaq, Siarnaq, and Tarvos were formally reported by the International Astronomical Union on 25 October 2000 and announced by Gladman's team a day later at a meeting hosted by the American Astronomical Society's Division for Planetary Sciences. The discovery of the four satellites raised Saturn's known moons to 22, surpassing Uranus's moon count of 21 at the time.

Although Siarnaq was confirmed as a satellite, the orbit was poorly known due to an insufficient number of observations. The moon was reobserved by the Kitt Peak National Observatory in December 2000, and later by the Palomar and La Palma observatories in early 2001. In the interim, Gladman's team had discovered eight more irregular satellites of Saturn, raising the planet's number of known moons to 30 and resultingly overtaking Jupiter as the planet with the most known moons until 2003.

== Name ==
The moon is named after Siarnaq, the Inuit sea giantess or goddess and ruler of the Inuit underworld Adlivun. In other variants of Inuit legend, she is also known by other names such as Nuliajuk and Sedna. Siarnaq is said to reside at the bottom of the ocean and to have conceived all sea life, which she will withhold from Inuit hunters when angered. In some versions of Inuit legend, Siarnaq was once a beautiful maiden who was tricked into marrying a bird-man and then was rescued by her father. They came under attack by a storm, which provoked the desperate father to sacrifice her to the sea in order to save himself.

The moon received its name in a formal notice published by the IAU on 8 August 2003, one month after its approval by the IAU's Working Group for Planetary System Nomenclature in a general assembly held in July 2003. Siarnaq was also assigned the Roman numeral designation Saturn XXIX, the 29th moon of Saturn.

=== Background ===
Before Siarnaq was given its name, it was formerly known by the provisional designation S/2000 S 3 assigned by the IAU in the discovery announcement. (Note: Gladman's astrometry page for Siarnaq notes that the moon was temporarily given the designation S/2000 S 2 before being renumbered to S 3 in the discovery announcement.) The provisional designation indicates that it was the third Saturnian satellite identified in images taken in 2000. Siarnaq is among the first Saturnian irregular satellites discovered since Phoebe in 1898; the discovery of new satellite groups of Saturn provided the opportunity for their discoverers to establish new naming conventions for each of them.

Kavelaars was advised by his colleagues to deviate from the traditional Greco-Roman mythology theme for Saturnian moons and instead propose names from different cultures. Throughout late 2000, Kavelaars spent several months consulting Amerindian scholars for appropriate name suggestions that were both multicultural and Canadian in origin. In March 2001, he was reading the Inuit tale Hide and Sneak to his children and had a revelation. He contacted the author of the tale, Michael Kusugak, to get his assent, and the latter suggested the names Kiviuq and Sedna. Kavelaars then decided that the selected Inuit names should end in the letter q to distinguish the group—hence the name Sedna was changed to Siarnaq. The former name was later used for 90377 Sedna, a distant trans-Neptunian object discovered in 2003.

I sent [Kavelaars] that bit about Siarnaq, or we call her Nuliajuk, that creature that lives under the sea, who's also know [sic] as Sedna. She's got so many names ... sometimes she's simply called the Old Woman Who Lives Down There. Anyway, I was talking about the realm of the shaman in this book, and I said, "And the only person who can go down there and comb her hair and make her feel better is the shaman Paaliaq." And this was just something I made up in my story. So I was really surprised when the final approved list of names of these four moons of Saturn included Paaliaq, because I just made him up. That was fun.

— Michael Kusugak, in a Windspeaker interview

== Physical characteristics ==
Cassini images of Siarnaq moving among background stars on 30 December 2013. The moon was observed 22 million km (14 million mi) away from the spacecraft.

=== Diameter and albedo ===
From infrared observations by the Wide-field Infrared Survey Explorer (WISE) spacecraft, Siarnaq is estimated to be 39.3 km (24.4 mi) in diameter. The geometric albedo of Siarnaq is estimated to be 0.050±0.017.

=== Surface and composition ===
Siarnaq is light red in color, and the Siarnaupian (Siarnaqan) spectrum in the infrared is very similar to the Inuit-group satellites Paaliaq and Kiviuq, supporting the thesis of a possible common origin in the break-up of a larger body.

The James Webb Space Telescope obtained the spectrum of Siarnaq over the 0.7-5.3 micron region with NIRSpec, finding a 3.0 micron absorption feature associated with hydrated minerals. Water ice was not found to be present in substantial quantities on Siarnaq, in contrast to Phoebe, the largest Saturnian irregular satellite. Additionally, carbon dioxide formed by irradiation of organic compounds was detected on Siarnaq's surface. Siarnaq appears nearly identical in its composition to Albiorix, another Saturnian irregular satellite observed by James Webb Space Telescope.

Observations of Siarnaq at different phase angles show that its brightness stays relatively constant at high phase angles, where it produces a shallow phase curve, but exhibits a strong opposition surge, where it sharply brightens by 0.2 magnitudes at opposition (zero phase). This phase curve behavior of Siarnaq suggests it has a highly porous surface likely covered with substantial regolith.

=== Shape and rotation ===
The rotation period of Siarnaq was measured by the Cassini spacecraft to be 10.19 hours; this is the shortest rotation period of all prograde irregular moons of Saturn. Siarnaq displays a light curve with three maxima and minima over a full rotation, implying a roughly triangular shape similar to that of Ymir. From Cassini observations of Siarnaq at different phase angles, the orientation of its north rotational pole has been determined to be pointing toward −23° ecliptic latitude and 98° ecliptic longitude. (Note: For geocentric equatorial coordinates, the north pole orientation of Siarnaq is RA = 97°±15°, Dec = 0°±15°.) This corresponds to a sideways axial tilt, indicating that Siarnaq experiences long, extreme seasons similar to the planet Uranus.

== Orbit and group ==
Siarnaq
Orbital characteristics
- Epoch 1 January 2000 12:00 UT (JD 2451545.0)
- Semi-major axis: 17,880,800 km (0.119526 AU)
- Eccentricity: 0.311
- Orbital period (sidereal): +2.45 yr (+895.87 d)
- Inclination: 48.2

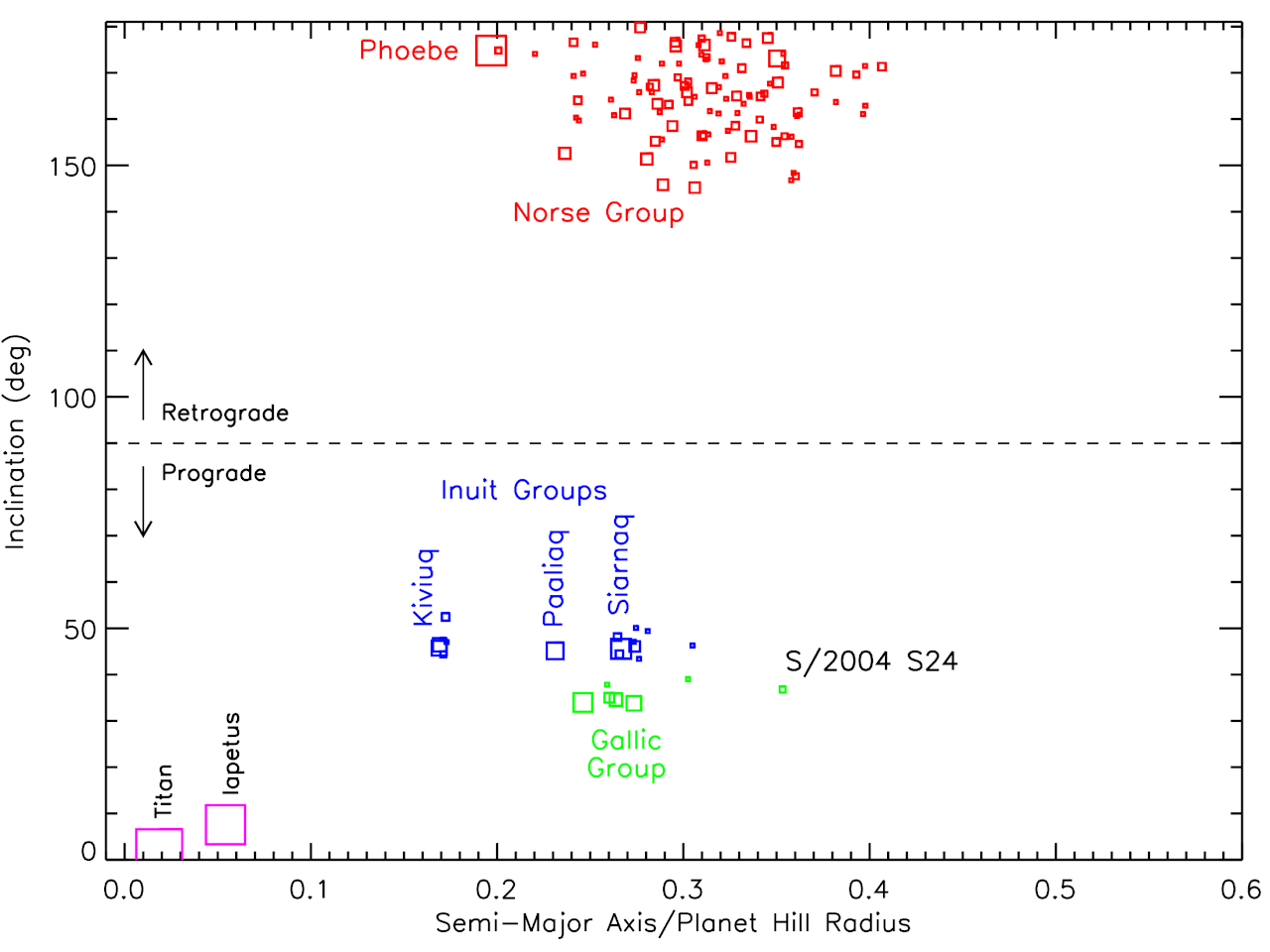
Diagram illustrating the orbits of the irregular satellites of Saturn. The inclination and semi-major axis are represented on the Y and X-axis, respectively. The satellites with inclinations below 90° are prograde, those above 90° are retrograde. The X-axis is labeled in terms of Saturn's Hill radius. The prograde Inuit and Gallic groups and the retrograde Norse group are identified. Titan and Iapetus are shown for comparison.

Animation of Saturn's Inuit group of satellites from 2018–2027 Kiviuq · Ijiraq · Paaliaq · Siarnaq · Tarqeq

Siarnaq orbits Saturn at an average distance of 17.9 million km (11.1 million mi) in 896 days (2.45 years). Due to gravitational perturbations from the Sun and other planets, the orbit of Siarnaq varies over time. Over a 200-year period, Siarnaq's semi-major axis fluctuates between 17.5–18.3 million km (10.9–11.4 million mi), eccentricity between 0.089–0.554, and inclination between 41.4°–54.3° with respect to the ecliptic. The moon is in a temporary secular resonance with Saturn, in which Siarnaq and Saturn have matching apsidal precession periods. (Note: The ecliptic longitudes of the periapsis of the satellite and the planet are locked according to Cuk & Burns (2004), although Nesvorný et al. (2003) find that this locking is only temporary, while Turrini et al. (2008) did not find any evidence of secular resonance in Siarnaq. Siarnaq's secular resonance with Saturn was first reported by Cuk et al. September 2002.) Siarnaq's high orbital eccentricity and inclination places it close to the threshold for Lidov–Kozai resonance.

Siarnaq belongs to Saturn's Inuit group of prograde irregular moons, which have average semi-major axes between 11.2–18.4 million km (7.0–11.4 million mi) and high average inclinations between 45°–50°. The Inuit group is further split into three distinct subgroups at different semi-major axes: the Kiviuq group, the Paaliaq group, and the Siarnaq group. The Siarnaq group is the outermost Inuit subgroup and includes seven known members: Siarnaq, Tarqeq, S/2004 S 31, S/2019 S 14, S/2020 S 3, S/2019 S 6, and S/2020 S 5. Moons in the Inuit group appear to be less abundant at smaller sizes, which implies that the Inuit group has existed long enough for collisions to have destroyed most of the smaller moons.
