= Calvin Helin =

Canadian businessman and writer

Calvin Helin /həˈliːn/ is a Canadian businessman and writer on aboriginal topics who is a member of the Tsimshian First Nation in northwestern British Columbia.

He is from the Tsimshian village community of Lax Kw'alaams, B.C., son of Barry Helin (Niisłaganuus, a hereditary chief of the Gitlaan tribe) and Verna Helin (of the royal House of 'Wiiseeks of the Ginaxangiik tribe). In the Tsimshian matrilineal system, he follows his mother as a Ginaxangiik Tsimshian of the Gispwudwada (Killerwhale) clan.

He is the author of the 2006 book Dances with Dependency: Indigenous Success through Self-Reliance, which is illustrated by his cousin Bill Helin.

As of 2018, Helin was the president of Eagle Spirit Energy Holding Ltd. Helin has taken an explicitly neutral stance on the Trans Mountain Expansion Project (pipeline expansion) in Canada.

== Sources ==
- Helin, Calvin (2006) Dances with Dependency: Indigenous Success through Self-Reliance. Vancouver: Orca Spirit Publishing and Communications.
