= Paaliaq =

Moon of Saturn

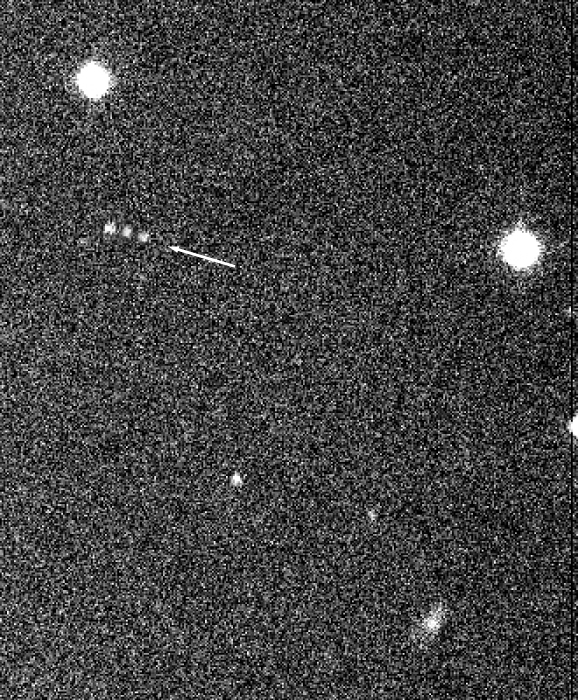
- Time lapse of Paaliaq moving along its orbit that lead to its discovery

Discovery
- Discovered by: J. J. Kavelaars et al.
- Discovery date: October 2000

Designations
- Designation: Saturn XX
- Pronunciation: /ˈpɑːli.ɑːk/
- Alternative names: S/2000 S 2
- Adjectives: Paaliapian, Paaliaqian (Note: The genitive form of Paaliaq is Paaliap. Thus the adjectival form could be absolutive Paaliaqian or genitive Paaliapian, parallel to nominative Venusian and genitive Venerian for Venus. See Inuktitut morphology)

Orbital characteristics
- Epoch 2000 January 1.5
- Semi-major axis: 14 997 700 km
- Eccentricity: 0.378
- Orbital period (sidereal): 685.7 d (1.88 yr)
- Inclination: 48.5° (to ecliptic)
- Satellite of: Saturn
- Group: Inuit group (Paaliaq)

Physical characteristics
- Mean diameter: 29 km 25 km 22 km
- Mass: 2.94×10^{16} kg (calculated)
- Mean density: 2.3 g/cm^{3} (assumed)
- Synodic rotation period: 18.79±0.09 h
- Albedo: <0.15 <0.10 (likely); 0.06 (assumed)
- Spectral type: red/D; B−V=0.86, R−V=0.40
- Apparent magnitude: 21.3 (R band)
- Absolute magnitude (H): 11.38±0.26 (V band); 11.7

Paaliaq is a prograde irregular satellite of Saturn. It was discovered by J. J. Kavelaars, Brett J. Gladman, Jean-Marc Petit, Hans Scholl, Matthew J. Holman, Brian G. Marsden, Philip D. Nicholson and Joseph A. Burns in early October 2000, and given the temporary designation S/2000 S 2. It was named in August 2003 after a fictional shaman in the book The Curse of the Shaman, written by Michael Kusugak, who supplied Kavelaars with the names of giants from Inuit mythology that were used for other Saturnian moons.

== Physical characteristics ==
Paaliaq is thought to be about 29 kilometres in diameter, and orbits Saturn at an average distance of 15.0 million km in 687 days. It is a member of the Inuit group of irregular satellites.

It is light red in color, and in the infrared the Paaliapian (Paaliaqan) spectrum is very similar to the Inuit-group satellites Kiviuq and Siarnaq, supporting the thesis of a possible common origin of the Inuit group in the break-up of a larger body. Its light curve has an unusual pattern of four minima, suggesting that it has a very peculiar shape.

Paaliaq imaged by the CFHT on 23 September 2000
