= Phoebe (moon) =

Moon of Saturn

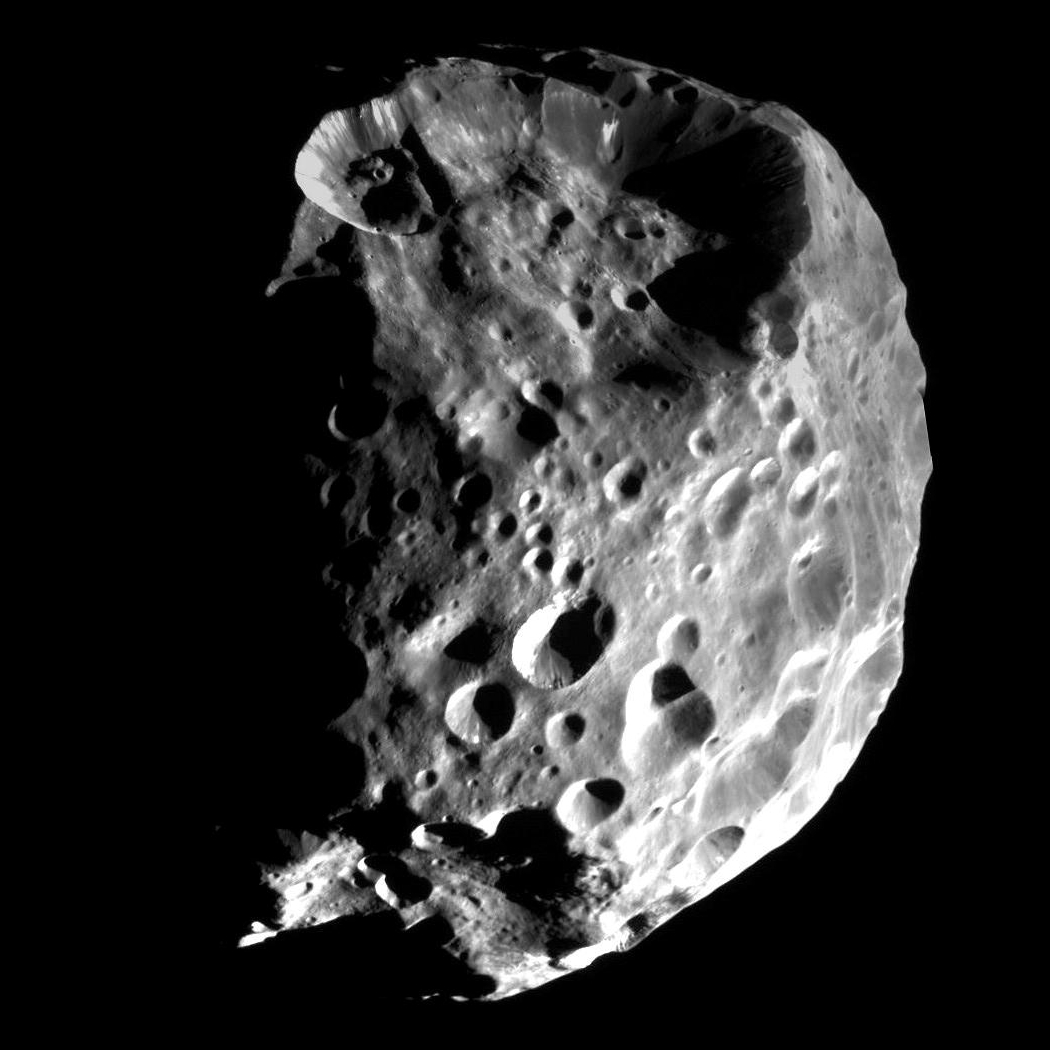
- Cassini image of Phoebe. Jason crater occupies much of the upper image

Discovery
- Discovered by: W. H. Pickering
- Discovery date: 18 March 1899 (from photos taken 16 August 1898)

Designations
- Designation: Saturn IX
- Pronunciation: /ˈfiːbi/ FEE-bee
- Named after: Φοίβη Phoíbē
- Adjectives: Phoebean /fiːˈbiːən/ fee-BEE-ən

Orbital characteristics
- Semi-major axis: 12 929 400 km
- Eccentricity: 0.164
- Orbital period (sidereal): 550.303910 d
- Average orbital speed: 1.71 km/s
- Inclination: 175.2° (to the Laplace plane); 151.64° (to Saturn's equator)
- Satellite of: Saturn
- Group: Norse group

Physical characteristics
- Dimensions: (219.4 × 219.4 × 202.4) ± 1.0 km
- Mean radius: 106.4±0.5 km
- Circumference: ~685 km (equatorial)
- Volume: (5.06±0.20)×10^{6} km^{3}
- Mass: (8.3123±0.0162)×10^{18} kg
- Mean density: 1.6428±0.0326 g/cm^{3}
- Surface gravity: 0.038–0.050 m/s^{2} (~1/200 to ~1/260 g)
- Escape velocity: 89–108 m/s
- Sidereal rotation period: 9.27365±0.00002 h (9 h 16 min 25 s)
- Axial tilt: 23.95° (to orbit)
- North pole right ascension: 356.6°±0.3°
- North pole declination: 78.0°±0.1°
- Albedo: 0.0856±0.0023 (visual geometric); 0.023±0.007 (Bond)
Surface temp.	min	mean	max
(low-latitude)	82 K		112 K
- Apparent magnitude: 16
- Absolute magnitude (H): 6.6; 6.59±0.02; 6.71

Phoebe (/ˈfiːbi/ FEE-bee) is the most massive irregular satellite of Saturn with a mean diameter of 213 km (132 mi). It was discovered by William Henry Pickering on 18 March 1899 from photographic plates that had been taken by DeLisle Stewart starting on 16 August 1898 at the Boyden Station of the Carmen Alto Observatory near Arequipa, Peru. It was the first natural satellite to be discovered photographically.

Phoebe was the first target encountered upon the arrival of the Cassini spacecraft in the Saturn system in 2004, and is thus unusually well-studied for an irregular moon of its size. Cassini's trajectory to Saturn and time of arrival were chosen to permit this flyby. After the encounter and its insertion into orbit, Cassini did not go much beyond the orbit of Iapetus.

Phoebe has a moderately eccentric, retrograde orbit, making it part of Saturn's Norse group of satellites. It is the second-largest retrograde satellite in the Solar System after Triton. Phoebe is roughly spherical and has a differentiated interior. It was spherical and hot early in its history and was battered out of roundness by repeated impacts. There is some evidence that it may be a captured centaur that originated in the Kuiper belt.

== Discovery and naming ==
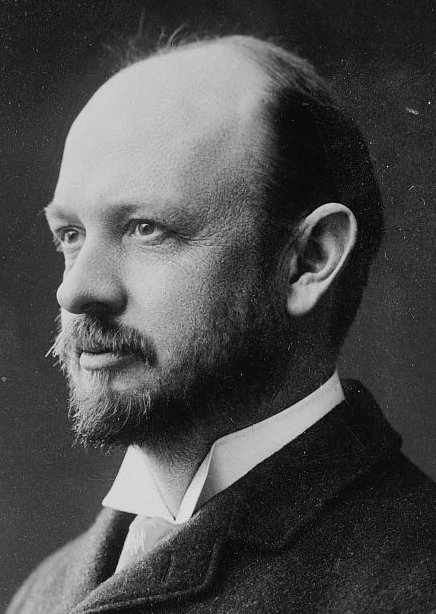
William Henry Pickering, discoverer of Phoebe

Phoebe was discovered by William Henry Pickering on 18 March 1899 from photographic plates that had been taken starting on 16 August 1898 at the Boyden Observatory near Arequipa, Peru, by DeLisle Stewart. It was the first satellite to be discovered photographically.

Phoebe is named after Phoebe, a Titaness in Greek mythology associated with the Moon, who was the sister of Cronus (the Greek equivalent of the Roman god Saturn). It is also designated Saturn IX in some scientific literature. The IAU nomenclature standards have stated that features on Phoebe are to be named after characters in the Greek myth of Jason and the Argonauts. In 2005, the International Astronomical Union officially named 24 craters (see Named surface features).

Toby Owen of the University of Hawaiʻi at Mānoa, chairman of the International Astronomical Union Outer Solar System Task Group said:

We picked the legend of the Argonauts for Phoebe as it has some resonance with the exploration of the Saturn system by Cassini–Huygens. We can't say that our participating scientists include heroes like Hercules and Atalanta, but they do represent a wide, international spectrum of outstanding people who were willing to take the risk of joining this voyage to a distant realm in hopes of bringing back a grand prize.

== Orbit and orbital interactions ==
Animation of Phoebe's orbit. Saturn · Phoebe · Titan

For more than 100 years Phoebe was Saturn's outermost known moon, until the discovery of several smaller moons in 2000. Phoebe is almost 4 times more distant from Saturn than its nearest major neighbor (Iapetus), and is substantially larger than any of the other moons orbiting planets at comparable distances. All of Saturn's regular moons except Iapetus orbit very nearly in the plane of Saturn's equator. The outer irregular satellites, including Phoebe, follow orbits that can be moderately to highly eccentric, and none is expected to rotate synchronously as all the regular moons of Saturn (except for Hyperion) do.

Phoebe completes a full orbit around Saturn in about 18 months, and its orbit is retrograde; that is, it orbits Saturn in the opposite direction to Saturn's orbit. This categorizes it in a group of irregular satellites called the Norse group. Phoebe's orbit is significantly different from those of the other irregular moons, and it was the innermost known orbit among all retrograde satellites of Saturn, until the announcement of S/2023 S 50 and S/2023 S 38 in 2025. There are a number of satellites with similar orbits that are speculated to be fragments from past collision events involving Phoebe, such as S/2006 S 20, S/2006 S 9, S/2019 S 2, and S/2007 S 2.

Once captured in orbit around Saturn, Phoebe had a significant effect on the irregular moon population of Saturn. Due to occupying a relatively much smaller orbital space, irregular satellites are expected to collide amongst themselves with a frequency four orders of magnitude greater than do main-belt asteroids. Phoebe is expected to be involved in half of these collisions, mostly due to its large cross-section. As any objects that crashed into it would have been eliminated, Phoebe may have cleared its orbital surroundings of other moons in this way, in a sense similar to the action of a major planet. This may have reduced the original irregular population from a value 30% greater than today, and decreased Phoebe's orbital distance from a value 30% larger than its present value. Some two thirds of the irregular moons present today were found to count as potential future impactors. Before the 2004 Cassini flyby, Phoebe was predicted to have a heavily cratered surface, with most of the large craters created from impacts with irregular moons.

=== Phoebe ring ===
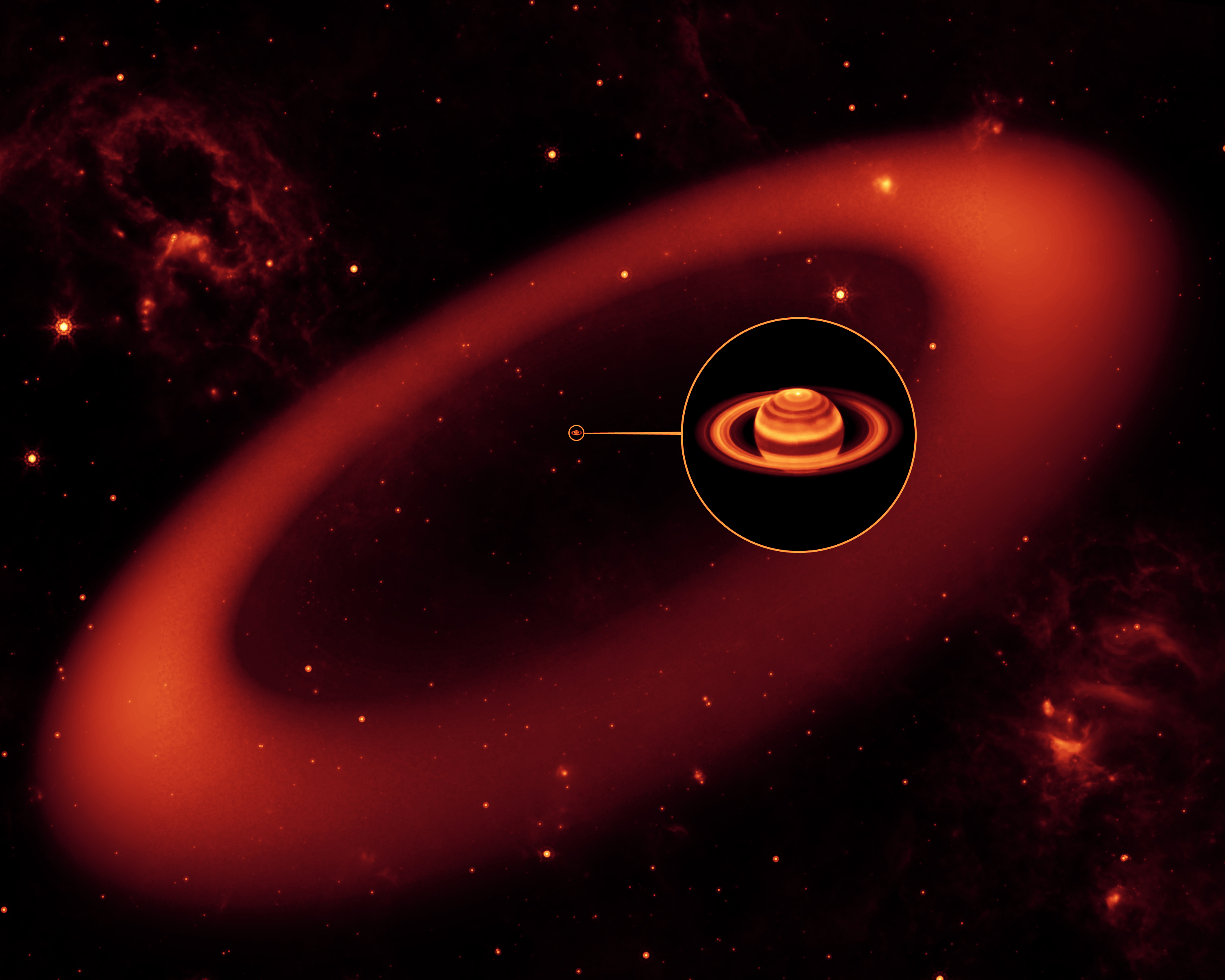
Artist's impression of the Phoebe ring, which dwarfs the main rings

The Phoebe ring is tilted 27 degrees from Saturn's equatorial plane (and the other rings of Saturn). It extends from at least 128 to 207 times the radius of Saturn; Phoebe orbits the planet at an average distance of 215 Saturn radii. The ring is about 40 times as thick as the diameter of the planet. Because the ring's particles are presumed to have originated from micrometeoroid impacts on Phoebe, they should share its retrograde orbit, which is opposite to the orbital motion of the next major moon inward, Iapetus. Inwardly migrating ring material would thus strike Iapetus's leading hemisphere, contributing to its two-tone coloration. Although very large, the ring is virtually invisible—it was discovered using NASA's infrared Spitzer Space Telescope.

Material displaced from Phoebe's surface by microscopic meteor impacts may be responsible for the dark areas on the surface of Hyperion, another one of Saturn's moons. (Note: The composition implied by spectra does not seem to support the earlier suggestion that Phoebe could be the source of the dark material deposited on Iapetus.) Debris from the biggest impacts may be the origin of some of the other moons of the Norse group—almost all of which are less than 10 km in radius.

== Physical characteristics ==
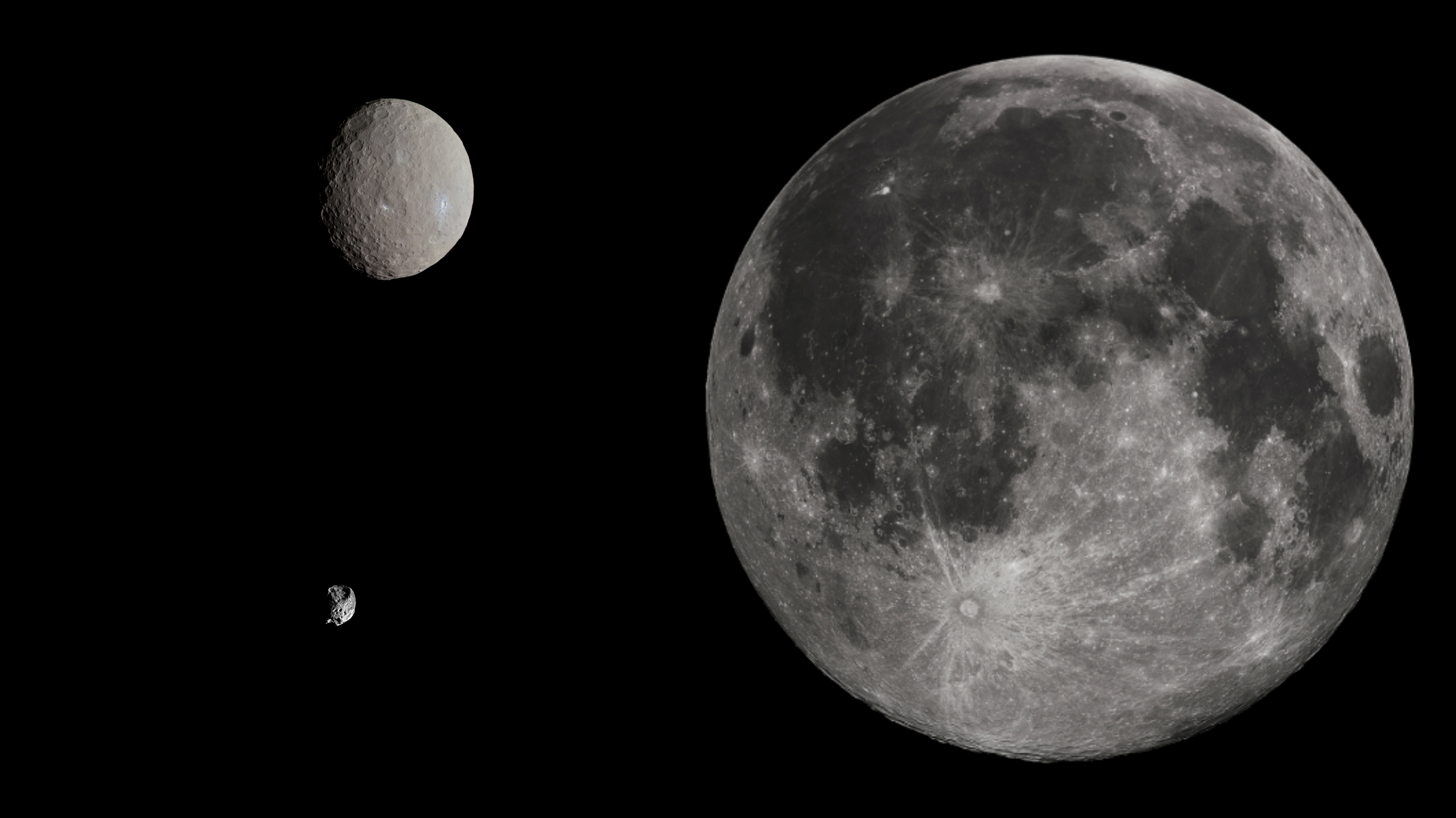
Phoebe compared to 1 Ceres and the Moon

Phoebe has a diameter of 212.8±1.0 km (132.2 mi), approximately one-sixteenth that of the Moon. It is Saturn's ninth-largest moon, but it is the eighth-most massive; Hyperion has a larger radius, but is less massive than Phoebe. Phoebe rotates every 9 hours and 16 minutes, and unlike its orbit, Phoebe rotates in the prograde direction. Its surface temperature generally ranges between 82–112 K (−191.2 – −161.2 °C), though it can drop below 75 K (−198.2 °C) at the poles at night. Phoebe is roughly spherical; its shape is consistent within error to an oblate spheroid. Its oblateness is consistent with an object in hydrostatic equilibrium with its rotation period.

Most of Saturn's inner moons have very bright surfaces, but Phoebe's albedo is much lower in comparison (around 8–9%), though relatively bright compared to the measured albedos of other irregular moons. The Phoebean surface is heavily scarred. The largest crater, Jason, is roughly 100 km in diameter. Phoebe's dark coloring initially led to scientists surmising that it was a captured asteroid, as it resembled the common class of dark carbonaceous asteroids. These are chemically very primitive and are thought to be composed of original solids that condensed out of the solar nebula with little modification since then.

However, images from Cassini indicate that Phoebe's craters show a considerable variation in brightness, which indicate the presence of large quantities of ice below a relatively thin blanket of dark surface deposits some 300 to 500 metres (980 to 1,640 ft) thick. In addition, quantities of carbon dioxide have been detected on the surface, a finding that has never been replicated for an asteroid. It is estimated that Phoebe is about 50% rock, as opposed to the 35% or so that typifies Saturn's inner moons. For these reasons, scientists are coming to think that Phoebe is in fact a captured centaur, one of a number of icy minor planets from the Kuiper belt that orbit the Sun between Jupiter and Neptune. Phoebe is the first such object to be imaged as anything other than a dot.

Spectroscopic observations of Phoebe by the James Webb Space Telescope and the VIMS instrument on Cassini have confirmed the presence of water ice and carbon dioxide on its surface, with ambiguous evidence for organic compounds. The overall shape of the spectrum resembles that of Kuiper belt objects, providing a compositional confirmation that Phoebe is a captured body. Phoebe also appears to have distinctly more water ice than other similarly observed Saturnian irregular satellites, such as Siarnaq and Albiorix.

=== Named surface features ===
Apart from one regio named after Phoebe's daughter, Leto, all named features are craters named after characters from the Greek legend of Jason and the Argonauts.

Craters
Name	Pronunciation	Greek	Coordinates	Diameter (km)	Approval Date	Named After	Ref
Acastus	/əˈkæstəs/	Ἄκαστος	9.6°N 148.5°W	34	2006	Son of Thessalian king Pelias, took part in the Calydonian boar hunt	WGPSN
Admetus	/ædˈmiːtəs/	Ἄδμητος	11.4°N 39.1°W	58	2006	Founder and king of Pherae in Thessaly	WGPSN
Amphion	/æmˈfaɪ.ɒn/	Ἀμφῑ́ων	27.0°S 1.8°W	18	2006	Son of Hyperasius and Hypso	WGPSN
Butes	/ˈbjuːtiːz/	Βούτης	49.6°S 292.5°W	29	2006	Son of Teleon, bee-master	WGPSN
Calais	/ˈkæliəs/	Κάλαϊς	38.7°S 225.4°W	31	2006	Son of Boreas, the north wind	WGPSN
Canthus	/ˈkænθəs/	Κάνθος	69.6°S 342.2°W	44	2006	Son of Kanethos or Cerion, the only member of the expedition to die in combat	WGPSN
Clytius	/ˈklɪtiəs, -ʃəs/	Κλυτίος	46.0°N 193.1°W	52	2006	Son of Eurytus, skilled archer who was killed by Apollo for challenging the god to a shooting match	WGPSN
Erginus	/ˈɜːrdʒɪnəs/	Ἐργῖνος	31.6°N 337.1°W	38	2006	Son of Neptune, helmsman of the Argo after the death of Tiphys	WGPSN
Euphemus	/juːˈfiːməs/	Εὔφημος	31.3°S 331.1°W	23	2006	Son of Neptune and Europa	WGPSN
Eurydamas	/jʊˈrɪdəməs/	Εὐρυδάμᾱς	61.5°S 281.6°W	19	2006	Son of Ctimenus	WGPSN
Eurytion	/jʊˈrɪtiən/	Εὐρυτίων	30.4°S 8.0°W	14	2006	Son of Kenethos or Cerion	WGPSN
Eurytus	/ˈjʊərɪtəs/	Εὔρυτος	39.7°S 177.2°W	89	2006	Son of Mercury and Antianira	WGPSN
Hylas	/ˈhaɪləs/	Ὕλας	7.9°N 354.5°W	30	2006	Son of Theiodamas/Theodamas, king of the Dryopes	WGPSN
Idmon	/ˈɪdmɒn/	Ἴδμων	67.1°S 197.8°W	61	2006	Son of Apollo and the nymph Cyrene, or of Abas, a prophet	WGPSN
Iphitus	/ˈɪfɪtəs/	Ἴφιτος	27.2°S 293.3°W	22	2006	Son of Eurytus, Jason's host during his consultation with the Oracle at Delphi	WGPSN
Jason	/ˈdʒeɪsən/	Ἰάσων	16.2°N 317.7°W	101	2006	The leading Argonaut, son of the Thessalian king Aeson, delivered the Fleece	WGPSN
Mopsus	/ˈmɒpsəs/	Μόψος	6.6°N 109.1°W	37	2006	Prophesying son of Apollo	WGPSN
Nauplius	/ˈnɔːpliəs/	Ναύπλιος	31.5°N 241.5°W	24	2006	Son of Neptune and Amymone, or of Klytoneos	WGPSN
Oileus	/oʊˈaɪliːəs/	Ὀϊλεύς	77.1°S 96.9°W	56	2006	King of the Locrians, renowned for his courage in battle	WGPSN
Peleus	/ˈpiːliːəs/	Πηλεύς	20.2°N 192.2°W	44	2006	Son of Aeacus, father of Achilles	WGPSN
Phlias	/ˈflaɪəs/	Φλίας	1.6°N 359.1°W	14	2006	Son of Dionysus	WGPSN
Talaus	/ˈtæliəs/	Ταλαός	52.3°S 325.2°W	15	2006	Son of Teleon, or of Bias and Pero	WGPSN
Telamon	/ˈtɛləmən/	Τελαμών	48.1°S 92.6°W	28	2006	Son of Aeacus, took part in the Calydonian boar hunt	WGPSN
Zetes	/ˈziːtiːz/	Ζήτης	20.0°S 223.0°W	29	2006	Son of Boreas, the north wind	WGPSN

Regios
Name	Pronunciation	Greek	Coordinates	Diameter (km)	Approval Date	Named After	Ref
Leto Regio	/ˈliːtoʊ/	Λητώ	60.0°N 20.0°W	95	2000	Daughter of Phoebe in Greek mythology	WGPSN

=== Maps ===
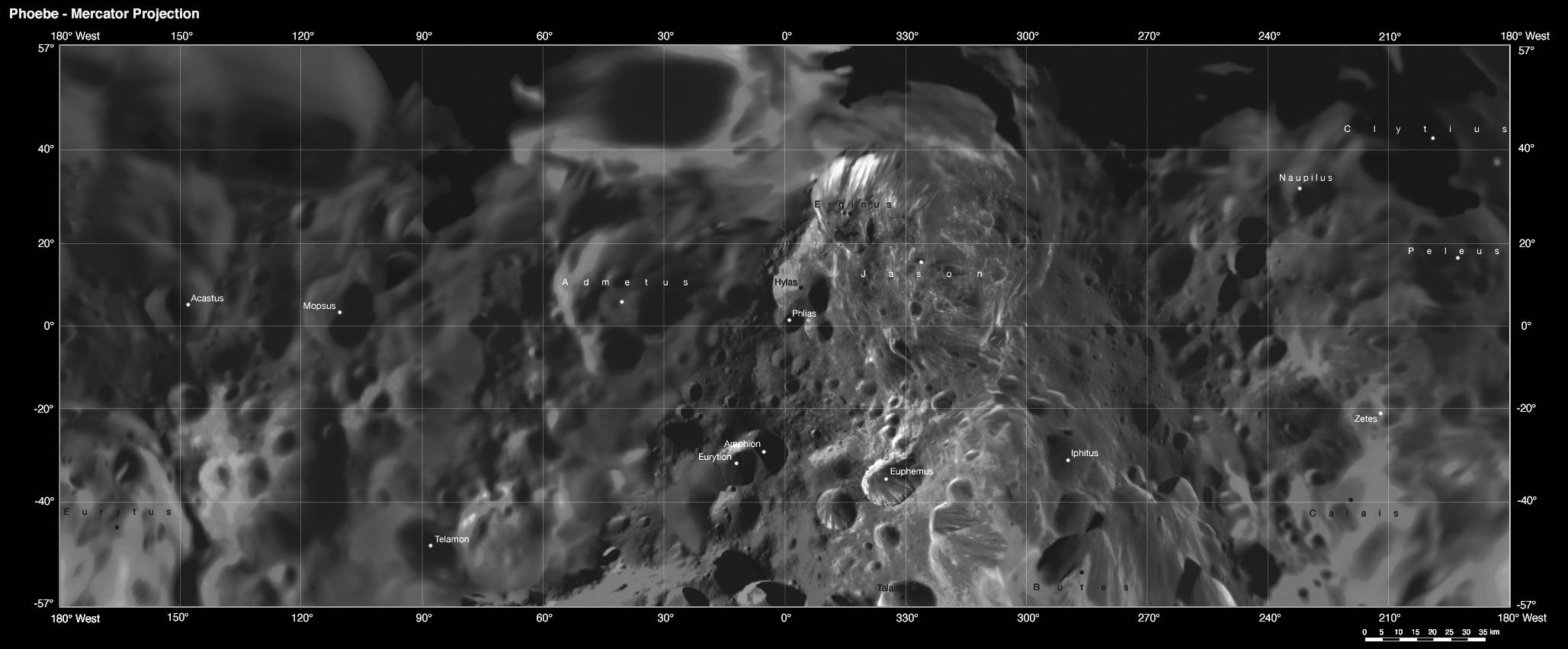
Map of Phoebe's middle latitudes. The higher latitudes have been clipped from the main map, but can be seen in the polar projections.

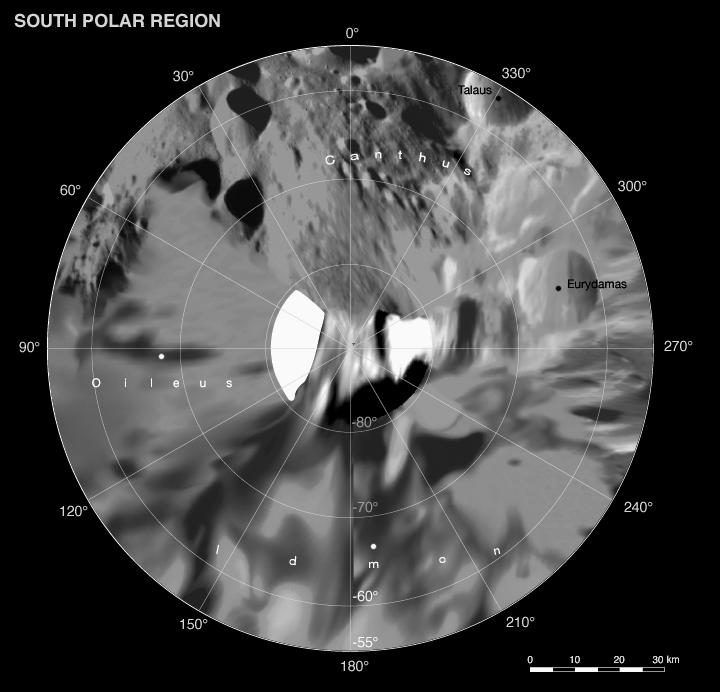
Map of Phoebe's south polar region

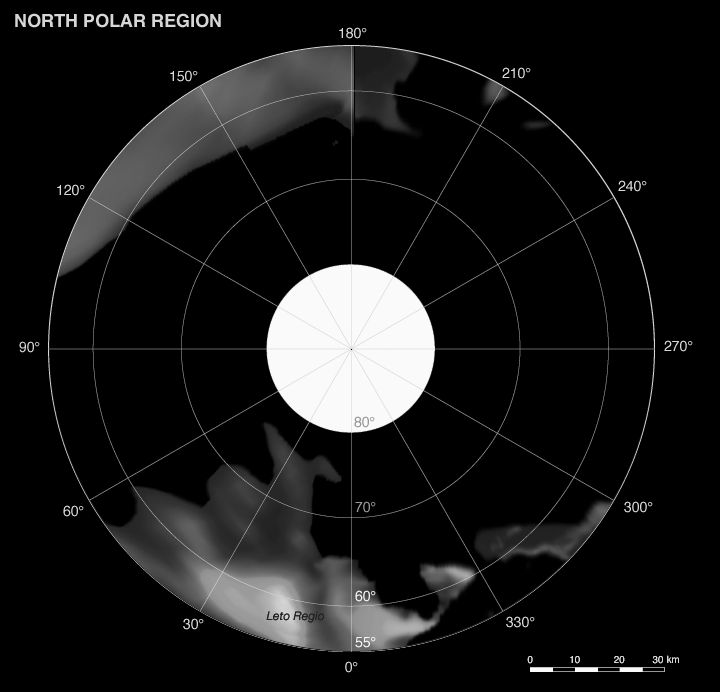
Map of Phoebe's north polar region

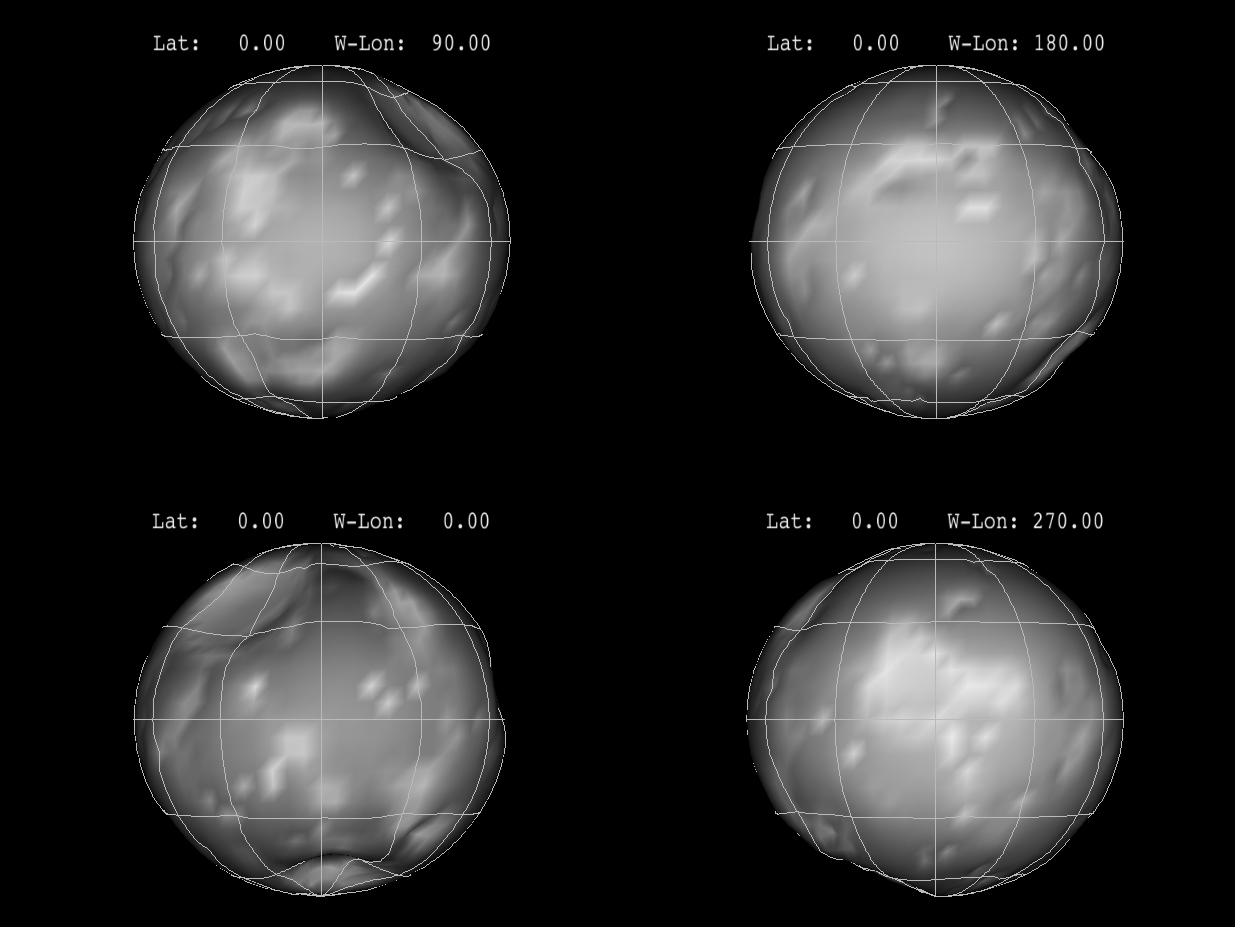
3D map showing Phoebe's once spherical shape

== Formation and evolution ==
Phoebe is usually assumed to have its origins in the outer Solar System, then becoming captured in orbit around Saturn later. It may have formed in the Kuiper belt within three million years after the origin of the Solar System. This was early enough that sufficient radioactive material was available to melt it into a sphere and stay warm enough to have liquid water for tens of millions of years. Despite its small size, Phoebe is thought to have attained a differentiated interior, before solidifying and being battered into its current, slightly non-equilibrium shape. However, it is asserted by some studies that Phoebe may have instead have an origin with C-type asteroids.

Phoebe is significantly larger than the next largest retrograde moon of Saturn (Ymir), which has been found difficult to explain. Its capture by Saturn may have been a fluke, or it may have been captured in a different way to that of the other irregulars. Alternatively, due to its density and C-type nature, Phoebe may have been more difficult to disrupt in a collision than D or P-type objects, resulting in one surviving object as opposed to splitting into many fragments.

== Observation and exploration ==
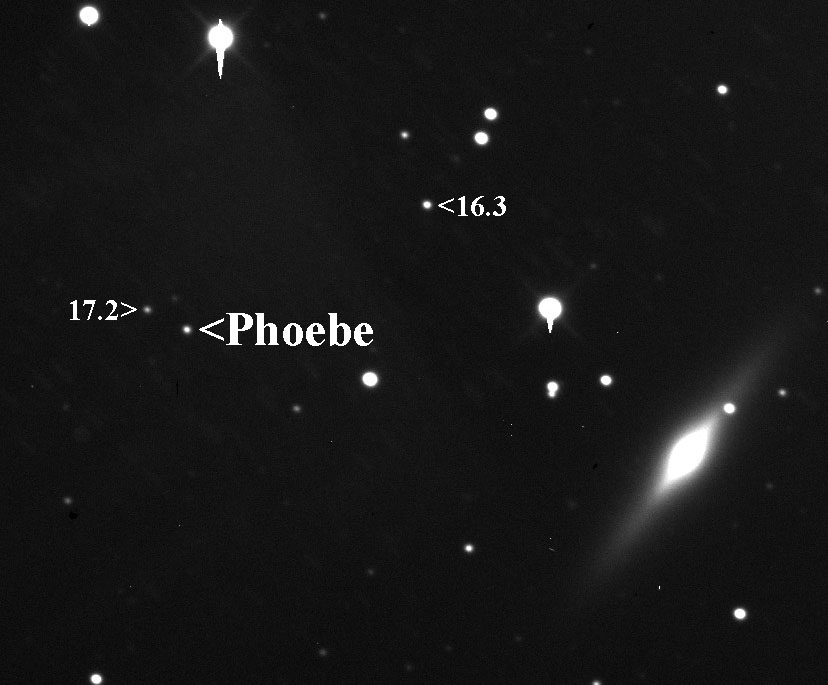
Phoebe (with NGC 4179 in the lower right corner) as imaged with a 24" telescope

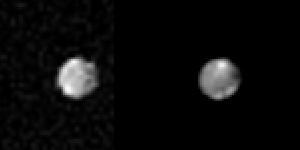
Images of different hemispheres of Phoebe by Voyager 2

Unlike Saturn's other moons, Phoebe was not favorably placed for the Voyager probes. Voyager 2 observed Phoebe for a few hours in September 1981. In the images, taken from a distance of 2.2 million kilometres at low phase angle, the size of Phoebe was approximately 11 pixels and showed bright spots on the otherwise dark surface.

Cassini passed 2,068 kilometres (1,285 mi) from Phoebe on 11 June 2004, returning many high-resolution images, which revealed a scarred surface. Because Voyager 2 had not been able to produce any high-quality images of Phoebe, obtaining them was a priority for the Cassini mission and its flight path was deliberately designed to take it close by; otherwise, Cassini would likely not have returned images much better than Voyager's. Because of Phoebe's short rotation period of approximately 9 hours, 17 minutes, Cassini was able to map nearly the entire surface of Phoebe. The close fly-by enabled the mass of Phoebe to be determined with an uncertainty of only 1 in 500.

== See also ==
- Moons of Saturn
