= Bill Helin =

Canadian artist and illustrator

Bill Helin /həˈliːn/ is a Canadian artist, illustrator, jewelry designer engraver, writer, tourism and branding expert, drumming specialist, singing and verbal storyteller; and logo and gift product designer in the Northwest Coast style and a member of the Tsimshian First Nation of northwestern British Columbia. His ancestry is from the Gits'iis tribe in the village of Lax Kw'alaams, B.C. His father was Arthur Helin-(pronounced Hel-een) (Haymaas), was a commercial fisherman and basketball star, was also in Chief lineage in the Gitlan tribe of the Tsimshian Nation.

Some of Bill's accomplishments include designing three patches worn by astronauts on the U.S. space shuttle Columbia 1996, and then two for Canadian Astronaut Dr. Robert Thirsk, on his second mission to the International Space Station in 2011. Plus a number of other important projects for the Canadian Space Agency. Five jewelry items were flown on the two missions along with Bill's patch designs. Bill and his mother, blanket maker, Carole Helin, (Listed in the book; Robes of Power), created a traditional hand made button blanket for the Canadian Space Agency, in the style of Robert Thirsk's Uniform patch design.

In 1994 Bill carved a 40' dugout canoe called the Ravensong and the same year worked on the world's tallest (192' 3" tall) totem pole known as the Spirit of Lekwammen, carved for the Commonwealth Games.

In 2013 Bill carved two 15' red cedar totem poles for the Canadian International School of Hong Kong, in a 21/2 month time period, as their first artist in residence projects, teaching over 1800 students of the carving process and many other topics of First Nations art and culture.

He is a cousin to the author Calvin Helin, whose 2006 book, Dances with Dependency, he illustrated, along with many other images inserted into two other books by Calvin Helin.

Bill was contracted by Strong Nations Publishers in Nanaimo to illustrate over 110 books since 2014. All these books and other learning toys and products are used in many schools and homes across Canada.

== Sources ==
- Helin, Calvin (2006) Dances with Dependency: Indigenous Success through Self-Reliance. Vancouver: Orca Spirit Publishing and Communications.
- Strong Nations Publishers, Nanaimo B.C. Tlingit First Nations book series: 8 bks written and illustrated by Bill Helin: Plus 106 more illustrated teaching books in the Strong Readers Series, widely used in most education systems in Canada.
