= Michael Martchenko =

Canadian illustrator (born 1942)

- Born: August 1, 1942 (age 84); Carcassonne, France
- Education: Ontario College of Art
- Known for: Illustrator

Michael Martchenko (born August 1, 1942) is a Canadian illustrator best known for illustrating many books by Robert Munsch.

== Early life ==
Born in Carcassonne, France, Martchenko moved to Canada when he was seven, where he graduated from the Ontario College of Art. Martchenko's early interest in drawing became apparent when he began creating his own depictions of his favourite comic books. Martchenko's fame in high school, Glenview Park Secondary School, Cambridge, Ontario, was based on the realistic "flip page" comics that adorned every one of his school texts and workbooks.

== Work ==
Although Martchenko began his career as a commercial artist, he was later approached by Robert Munsch and Annick Press representatives to consider a career in children's book illustrating after they saw his work at a graphic arts exhibition. His first Munsch book was 1980's The Paper Bag Princess after his six-year-old daughter read the story; he is now the go-to illustrator for Munsch books.

In 1984, Martchenko began his artistic partnership with Allen Morgan, author of the "Matthew’s Midnight Adventure" series. It was not until 1990 that he first authored and illustrated his own book, Birdfeeder Banquet. His second self-authored and illustrated book, Ma, I’m a Farmer, was published in 2003.

Martchenko's most famous works are made in partnership with Canadian Author Robert Munsch. On their long lived partnership, Martchenko has said, "I think that respecting each other's talents and experience, plus good communication can go a long way to creating a positive work relationship. You need to be on the same page creatively and share the same desire to produce the best books that you can. Robert Munsch and Allen Morgan's stories are funny, zany, and at times, a little crazy – so I fit right in. My type of visual humour, which at times can be a little crazy also, seems to complement their stories. Being able to exchange ideas is important as well. I can suggest changes to copy and they can make suggestions to illustrations. If it improves the story, we're all okay with that. We like one another, we get along and egos don't get in the way. It's worked for all these years and still does."

Aside from his passion for illustrating children's books, Martchenko also has an interest in aviation and military art and history.

== Personal life ==
Martchenko and his wife, Patricia, live in Toronto's Leaside. They have three daughters: Holly, Susan, and Janet.

== Works ==
=== As author ===
- Birdfeeder Banquet (1990)
- Ma, I’m a Farmer (2003)

=== As illustrator only ===
With Robert Munsch

- 50 Below Zero
- Angela's Airplane
- The Boy in the Drawer
- The Dark
- David's Father
- The Fire Station
- From Far Away
- Hugs
- I Have to Go!
- Jonathan Cleaned Up—Then He Heard a Sound
- Kiss Me, I'm Perfect
- Look At Me!
- Makeup Mess
- Moira's Birthday
- More Pies
- Mortimer
- Murmel, Murmel, Murmel
- No clean clothes
- The Paper Bag Princess: 25th Anniversary Edition
- The Paper Bag Princess
- Pigs
- Playhouse
- Show and Tell
- Something Good
- Stephanie's Ponytail
- Thomas' Snowsuit
- Wait and See
- Smelly Socks
- Zoom

With Allen Morgan

- Matthew and the Midnight Tow Truck (1984)
- Matthew and the Midnight Turkeys (1985)
- Matthew and the Midnight Money Van (1987)
- Matthew and the Midnight Pilot (1997)
- Matthew and the Midnight Ball Game (1997)
- Matthew and the Midnight Flood (1998)
- Matthew and the Midnight Hospital (1999)
- Matthew and the Midnight Wrestlers (1999)
- Matthew and the Midnight Bank (2000)
- Matthew and the Midnight Wrecker (2001)
- Matthew and the Midnight Movie (2002)
- Matthew and the Midnight Firefighter (2003)
- Matthew and the Midnight Pirates (2005)
- The Magic Hockey Skates (1991)

With Rick Rossiter

- Mixed Up Michael

With Don Gillmore

- Sophie and the Sea Monster

With Loris Lesynski

- Boy Soup
- I Did It Because...: How a Poem Happens
