= Kiviuq (moon) =

Moon of Saturn

- Kiviuq imaged by the Canada-France-Hawaii Telescope in September 2000

Discovery
- Discovered by: JJ Kavelaars et al.
- Discovery date: 18 November 2000

Designations
- Designation: Saturn XXIV
- Pronunciation: /ˈkɪvi.ʌk/
- Named after: Kiviuq
- Alternative names: S/2000 S 5
- Adjectives: Kiviupian, Kiviuqian (Note: The genitive form of Kiviuq is Kiviup. Thus the adjectival form could be absolutive Kiviuqian or genitive Kiviupian, parallel to nominative Venusian and genitive Venerian for Venus. See Inuktitut morphology)

Orbital characteristics
- Epoch 2000 January 1.5
- Semi-major axis: 11.3074 million km
- Eccentricity: 0.275
- Orbital period (sidereal): 448.91 d (1.23 yr)
- Inclination: 48.0° (to the ecliptic)
- Satellite of: Saturn
- Group: Inuit group (Kiviuq)

Physical characteristics
- Dimensions: 38.42 × 17 × 7.64 km (Note: Assuming the medium axis is equal to the diameter calculated from the assumed albedo.)
- Mean diameter: 17+50% −30% km
- Synodic rotation period: 21.97±0.16 h
- Albedo: <0.15 <0.10 (likely); 0.06 (assumed)
- Spectral type: B−V=0.87; R−V=0.66/0.48; D-type
- Apparent magnitude: 22.0
- Absolute magnitude (H): 12.6

Kiviuq is a prograde irregular satellite of Saturn. It was discovered by JJ Kavelaars et al. in 2000, and given the temporary designation S/2000 S 5. It was named after Kiviuq, a hero of Inuit mythology.

Kiviuq is about 17 km in diameter, and orbits Saturn at an average distance of 11.3 million kilometers in 449 days. It is a member of the Inuit group of irregular satellites. It is light red, and the Kiviupian (Kiviuqan) infrared spectrum is very similar to the Inuit-group satellites Siarnaq and Paaliaq, supporting the thesis of a possible common origin of the Inuit group in the break-up of a larger body.

Kiviuq is believed to be in Kozai resonance, cyclically reducing its orbital inclination while increasing the eccentricity and vice versa. Its current orbital elements overlap strongly with Phoebe's orbit, and the moons will likely eventually collide with each other.

The light curve amplitude of Kiviuq is large, varying in brightness by over 2 magnitudes. The large amplitude of Kiviuq suggests that it has an elongated shape, and may be a possible contact binary.

== Exploration ==
On 30 August 2010, the ISS camera of the Cassini–Huygens spacecraft took light-curve data from a distance of 9.3 million km. With this data, the rotation period was measured to be 21 hours and 49 minutes. This was later refined to 21 hours and 58 minutes.
