= Francisco (moon) =

Irregular moon of Uranus

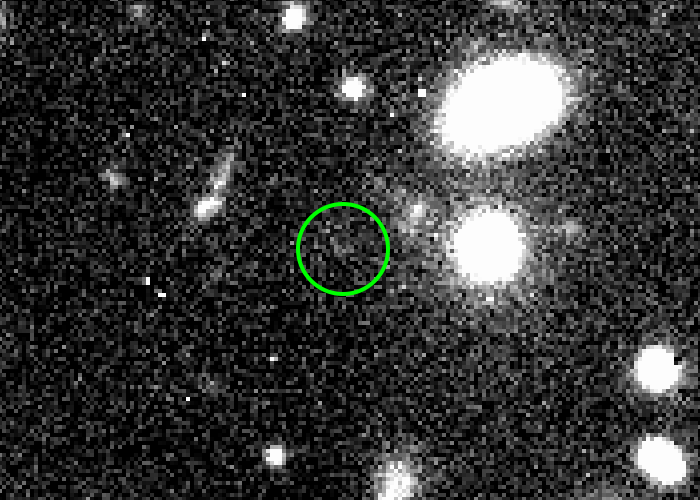
- Francisco imaged by the Very Large Telescope on 3 September 2002

Discovery
- Discovered by: JJ Kavelaars; Matthew J. Holman; Dan Milisavljevic; Tommy Grav
- Discovery site: Cerro Tololo Obs.
- Discovery date: 13 August 2001

Designations
- Designation: Uranus XXII
- Pronunciation: /frænˈsɪskoʊ/
- Named after: Francisco (The Tempest character)
- Alternative names: S/2001 U 3

Orbital characteristics (range) (Note: Sheppard et al. (2024) give the mean, minimum, and maximum values for Ferdinand's osculating orbital elements in Table 5: semi-major axis 4275700+700 −700 km, eccentricity 0.14+0.05 −0.05, inclination 147°+2° −1° with respect to the ecliptic, and orbital period 267+1 −1. The error bars represent the difference between the minimum/maximum value and the average value over a 10,000-year period.)
- Semi-major axis: 4,275,000 to 4,276,400 km (0.028577 to 0.028586 AU)
- Eccentricity: 0.09 to 0.19
- Orbital period (sidereal): 0.73 to 0.73 years (266 to 268 d)
- Inclination: 146° to 149° (to ecliptic)
- Satellite of: Uranus
- Group: None known

Proper orbital elements (average) (Note: The proper orbital elements of Francisco listed in the infobox are average (mean) values over a 10,000-year period, as shown in Table 5 of Sheppard et al. (2024) and Jet Propulsion Laboratory's Planetary Satellite Mean Elements table.)
- Proper semi-major axis: 4,275,700 km (0.028581 AU)
- Proper eccentricity: 0.144
- Proper inclination: 146.8° (to ecliptic)
- Proper orbital period: 0.73 years (267 d)
- Precession of perihelion long.: 103.904434 arcsec / yr
- Precession of asc. node: 89.8814065 arcsec / yr

Physical characteristics
- Mean diameter: 22 km
- Apparent magnitude: 25.0 (R-band)
- Absolute magnitude (H): 12.9

Francisco, also known as Uranus XXII and previously as S/2001 U 3, is the innermost known irregular moon of Uranus. It was discovered on 13 August 2001 by JJ Kavelaars, Matthew J. Holman, Dan Milisavljevic, and Tommy Grav at Cerro Tololo Inter-American Observatory in Chile. It was named after Francisco, a lord in William Shakespeare's play The Tempest. Francisco orbits Uranus at an average distance of 4.3 million km (2.7 million mi) and takes about 267 Earth days (0.73 Earth years) to complete one orbit. It follows a retrograde orbit around the planet, moving in the opposite direction to the planet's orbit around the Sun. Francisco has not been studied up close by any spacecraft, though Voyager 2 coincidentally passed nearby during its 1986 Uranus flyby. Francisco is estimated to have a diameter of 22 km (14 mi), though most of its physical properties are unknown.

== Discovery ==
Francisco was discovered on 13 August 2001 by astronomers JJ Kavelaars, Matthew J. Holman, Dan Milisavljevic, and Tommy Grav, who at the time were searching for distant moons of Uranus. The discovery observations were made at Cerro Tololo Inter-American Observatory, Chile, using the 4-meter Víctor M. Blanco Telescope equipped with a wide-field camera. The group identified Francisco and three other Uranian irregular moons (Trinculo, Ferdinand, and Margaret (Note: Margaret ended up lost in 2001, but was rediscovered by Scott Sheppard and David C. Jewitt in 2003.)) in the telescope images. The images were processed using the shift-and-add technique, which combines multiple exposures aligned to Uranus's motion to enhance the faint moons.

To determine the orbit of Francisco, the group continued observing the moon from different observatories, including the 5.1 m (200 in) Hale Telescope at Palomar Observatory and 8.2 m (27 ft) Very Large Telescope at Paranal Observatory. These follow-up observations lasted until 5 September 2002. The Minor Planet Center announced the discovery of Francisco on 6 October 2003.

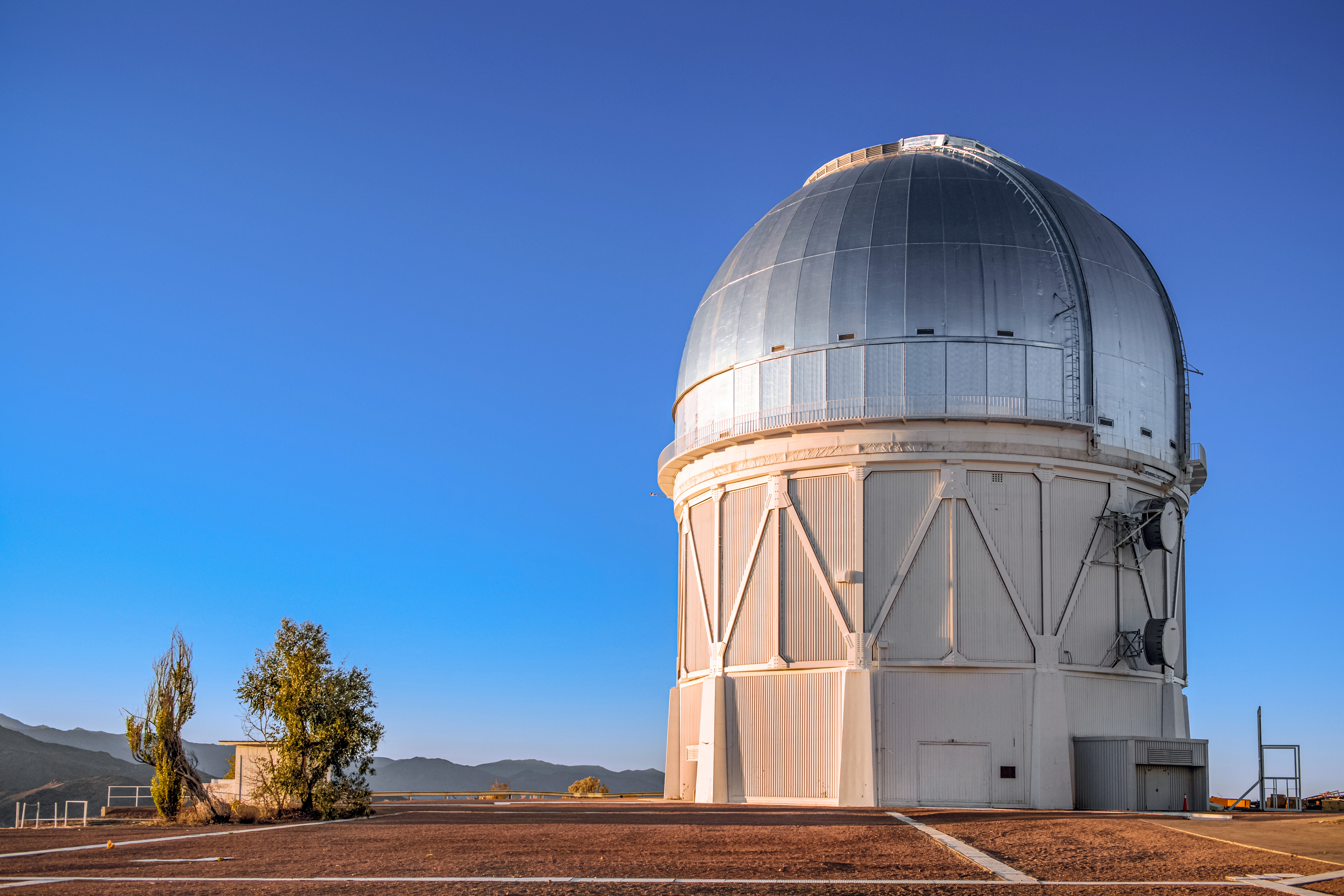
The Víctor M. Blanco Telescope was used for the discovery of Francisco in 2001.

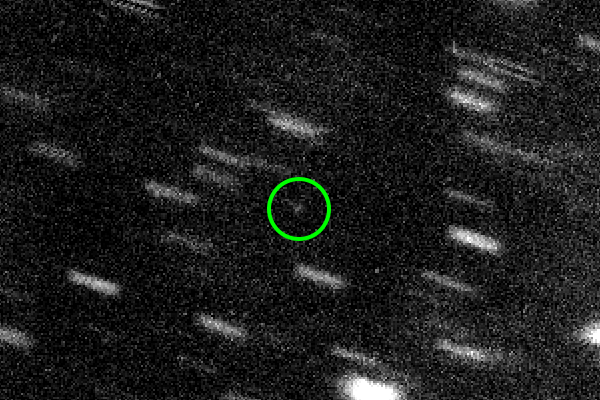
Because Francisco is extremely faint, it is better seen by shifting-and-adding multiple images of its location. The result is Francisco appearing as a single dot against trailed background stars.

== Name ==
When the discovery of Francisco was announced, it was given the temporary provisional designation "S/2001 U 3" by the Minor Planet Center. It was later named and given the Roman numeral designation Uranus XXII by the International Astronomical Union's Working Group for Planetary System Nomenclature on 29 December 2005. The moon was named after Francisco, a character in William Shakespeare's play The Tempest. In the play, Francisco is a lord who is shipwrecked with King Alonso and others. In a 2014 interview with the Folger Shakespeare Library, Kavelaars mentioned that he picked the name because it resembled his younger daughter's middle name, Frances.

== Orbit ==
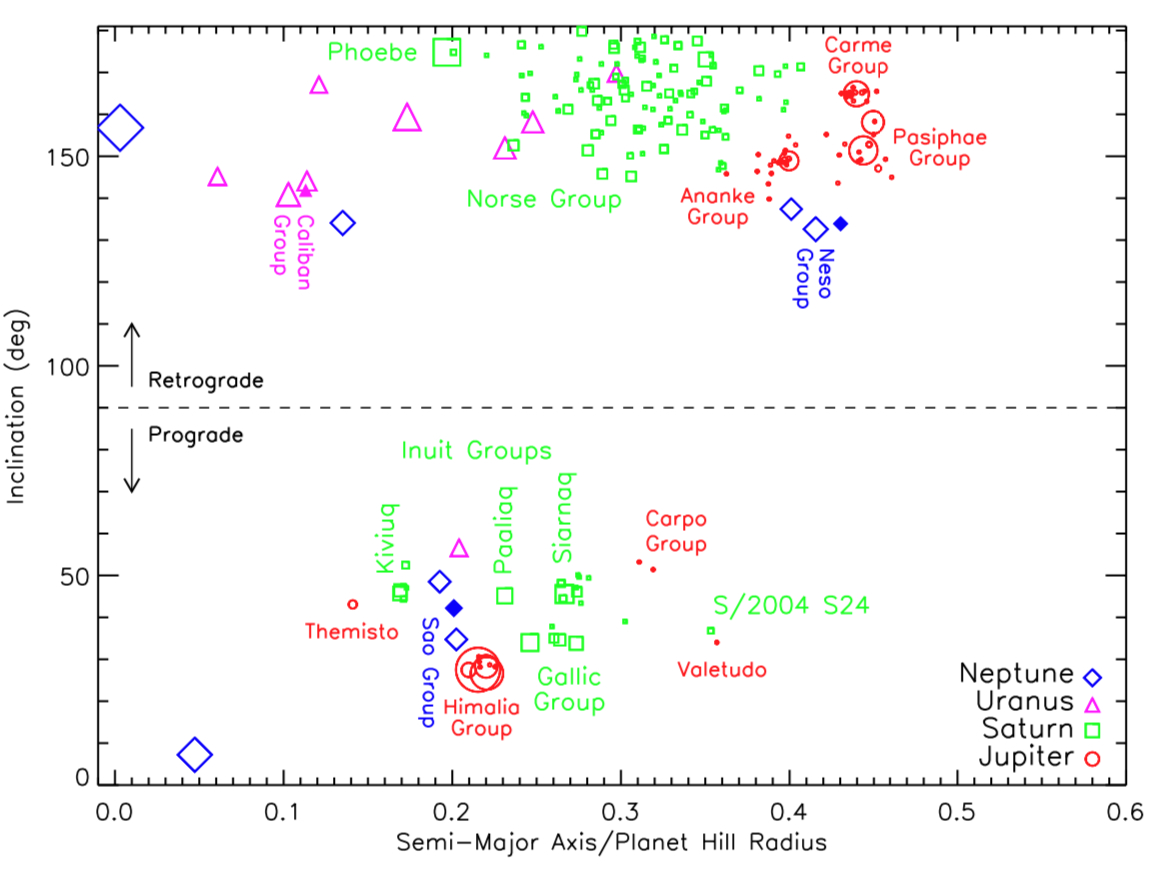
Irregular moons of all four giant planets, plotted by average distance from their planet (semi-major axis in Hill radii) and orbital inclination (degrees with respect to ecliptic). Francisco is the innermost irregular moon of Uranus (the leftmost magenta triangle). Data as of February 2024.

Francisco is one of Uranus's irregular moons, which have very wide, elliptical, and inclined orbits in contrast to the regular moons of Uranus. Irregular moons like Francisco are thought to have been captured by their planet during the Solar System's formation. The Uranian irregular moons are loosely bound by Uranus's gravity because of their great distance from the planet, so their orbits are frequently perturbed by the gravity of the Sun and other planets. This results in significant changes in their orbits over short periods of time, so a simple Keplerian elliptical orbit cannot accurately describe their long-term orbital motions. Instead, proper or mean orbital elements are used to describe the long-term orbits of irregular moons more accurately, since these are calculated by averaging out the perturbed orbit over an extended period of time.

Francisco is the innermost known irregular moon of Uranus, having an average semi-major axis of 4.28 million km (2.66 million mi; 0.0286 AU) and an average orbital period of 0.73 years (267 days). It has an average orbital eccentricity of 0.14 and an average inclination of 147° with respect to the ecliptic, or the plane of Earth's orbit. Since Francisco's orbital inclination is greater than 90°, the moon's orbit is retrograde, meaning it orbits in the opposite direction to Uranus's orbit around the Sun.

Over a 10,000-year time span, perturbations cause Francisco's semi-major axis to vary by ±700 km (430 mi), while its orbital period varies by ±1 day. Over a period of several thousand years, Francisco's eccentricity slowly varies from 0.09 to 0.19. Its inclination with respect to the ecliptic also varies from 146° to 149°. Its orbit exhibits nodal and apsidal precession with average periods between 10,000 and 20,000 Earth years. (Note: Brozović et al. (2022) gives 18,000 and 14,000 years for Francisco's apsidal and nodal precession periods, respectively. On the other hand, JPL (2024) gives 12,473 and 14,419 years for Francisco's apsidal and nodal precession periods, respectively.)

Francisco is not known to be part of a collisional family or group; its orbit is apparently unique among the known Uranian irregular moons. If there is a collisional family associated with Francisco, then any Uranian irregular moons related to it are likely undiscovered because they are presumably small and faint.

The orbit of Francisco (red) and other Uranian irregular moons (gray) as seen from three different views. Francisco's orbit is nearly perpendicular to the plane of Uranus's equator and regular moons (magenta).

== Physical characteristics ==
In red light (R-band), Francisco appears very faint with an apparent magnitude of 25.0. It can only be observed through long-exposure imaging by large-aperture telescopes. Little is definitively known about Francisco's physical properties other than its absolute magnitude of 12.9, which can be used to estimate the moon's diameter. Assuming Francisco has a low geometric albedo of 0.04 like other Uranian irregular moons, Francisco's diameter has been estimated to be 22 km (14 mi). Like these moons, Francisco is expected to have a dark surface composed of water ice, hydrated silicates, and organic compounds.

== Exploration ==
Francisco has not been imaged at close range by a space probe, although Voyager 2 did coincidentally pass within 2.4 million km (1.5 million mi) of Francisco during its flyby of Uranus in 1986. All Uranian irregular moons, including Francisco, have been identified as distant observation targets for the proposed Uranus Orbiter and Probe (UOP), which would measure the Uranian irregular moons' rotation periods and shapes by monitoring their brightness change over time. However, the UOP may not be able to perform a close flyby of Francisco because the moon does not orbit near the ecliptic plane.

== See also ==
- Other Uranian irregular moons discovered in 2001:
  - Trinculo
  - Ferdinand
  - Margaret (lost in 2001, rediscovered in 2003)
- 2001 QW322 – a wide binary system of Kuiper belt objects discovered during a search for Uranian moons in 2001
