= Ferdinand (moon) =

Outermost moon of Uranus

- Ferdinand (circled) photographed by the Gemini North telescope on 20 September 2003

Discovery
- Discovered by: Dan Milisavljevic; Matthew J. Holman; JJ Kavelaars; Tommy Grav (Note: This is the exact order of discoverers listed by NASA, the International Astronomical Union, and the United States Geological Survey.)
- Discovery site: Cerro Tololo Obs.
- Discovery date: 13 August 2001

Designations
- Designation: Uranus XXIV
- Pronunciation: /ˈfɜːrdənænd/
- Named after: Ferdinand (The Tempest character)
- Alternative names: S/2001 U 2
- Adjectives: Ferdinandian /fɜːrdəˈnændiən/

Orbital characteristics (range) (Note: Sheppard et al. (2024) give the mean, minimum, and maximum values for Ferdinand's osculating orbital elements in Table 5: semi-major axis 20421400+455900 −338500 km, eccentricity 0.40+0.09 −0.09, inclination 169°+3° −2° with respect to the ecliptic, and orbital period 2788+94 −69. The error bars represent the difference between the minimum/maximum value and the average value over a 10,000-year period.)
- Observation arc: 20.21 years (7,383 d)
- Semi-major axis: 20,082,900 to 20,877,300 km (0.134246 to 0.139556 AU)
- Eccentricity: 0.31 to 0.49
- Orbital period (sidereal): 7.44 to 7.89 years (2,719 to 2,882 d)
- Inclination: 167° to 172° (to ecliptic)
- Satellite of: Uranus

Proper orbital elements (average) (Note: The proper orbital elements of Ferdinand listed in the infobox are average (mean) values over a 10,000-year period, as shown in Table 5 of Sheppard et al. (2024) and Jet Propulsion Laboratory's Planetary Satellite Mean Elements table.)
- Proper semi-major axis: 20,421,400 km (0.136509 AU)
- Proper eccentricity: 0.395
- Proper inclination: 169.2° (to ecliptic)
- Proper orbital period: 7.63 years (2,788 d)
- Precession of perihelion long.: 1734.939759 arcsec / yr
- Precession of asc. node: 1294.705295 arcsec / yr

Physical characteristics
- Mean diameter: 21 km
- Synodic rotation period: 23.68±0.50 h (double-peak); 11.84±0.22 h (single-peak)
- Albedo: >0.03
- Apparent magnitude: 25.1 (R-band)
- Absolute magnitude (H): 12.40

Ferdinand, also known as Uranus XXIV and previously as S/2001 U 2, is the outermost known moon of Uranus. It was discovered on 13 August 2001 by Dan Milisavljevic, Matthew J. Holman, JJ Kavelaars, and Tommy Grav at Cerro Tololo Inter-American Observatory in Chile. Named after a prince from William Shakespeare's play The Tempest, Ferdinand orbits Uranus at an average distance of 20.4 million km (12.7 million mi) and takes about 7.63 Earth years to complete one orbit. It follows a retrograde orbit, meaning it moves in the opposite direction to the planet's orbit around the Sun. Although Ferdinand has not been studied up close by any spacecraft, telescope observations suggest that it has an elongated shape with a diameter of about 20 km (12 mi) and a rotation period of either 12 or 24 hours.

== Observational history ==
=== Discovery and loss ===
Ferdinand was discovered on 13 August 2001 by astronomers Dan Milisavljevic, Matthew J. Holman, JJ Kavelaars, and Tommy Grav, who at the time were searching for distant moons of Uranus. The discovery observations were made at Cerro Tololo Inter-American Observatory, Chile using the 4-meter Víctor M. Blanco Telescope equipped with a wide-field camera. The group identified Ferdinand and three other Uranian moons—Francisco, Trinculo, and Margaret (Note: Margaret ended up lost in 2001, but was rediscovered by Scott Sheppard and David C. Jewitt in 2003.)—in the telescope images. The images were processed using the shift-and-add technique, which combines multiple exposures aligned to Uranus's motion.

To determine whether Ferdinand was orbiting Uranus, the group attempted to reobserve it with large optical telescopes, including the 5.1 m (200 in) Hale Telescope at Palomar Observatory. However, they were only able to detect Ferdinand on 21 September 2001; subsequent attempts were unsuccessful because the moon was too faint to detect reliably. With only two nights of observations, Ferdinand's orbit could not be determined and it became lost.

=== Recovery ===
Ferdinand was independently rediscovered by Scott S. Sheppard and David C. Jewitt on 29 August 2003, during their search for Uranian moons with the 8.3-meter (27 ft) Subaru Telescope at Mauna Kea Observatory. Unaware that Ferdinand had already been detected in 2001, Sheppard and Jewitt continued observing the apparently new moon on 20 September 2003, using the Gemini North telescope at Mauna Kea. On 24 September, Brian G. Marsden of the Minor Planet Center recognized that Sheppard and Jewitt had recovered Ferdinand. Holman confirmed Marsden's identification after observing Ferdinand from Las Campanas Observatory on 30 September, which prompted the Minor Planet Center to announce the moon's discovery later that day.

For several years after its discovery, Ferdinand remained poorly observed and still had an uncertain orbit, which put it at risk of being lost again. To improve the understanding of its orbit, a team led by Robert A. Jacobson and Marina Brozović conducted a campaign to reobserve Ferdinand and several other poorly observed moons from 2009 to 2011. Although Ferdinand's orbital uncertainty persisted after these observations, its slow orbit around Uranus ensured that it would not be lost again by the next century. Ferdinand remained unobserved until 8 September 2021, when Sheppard began another search for Uranian moons with the Subaru Telescope. As of 2026, Ferdinand's observation arc spans 20.21 years (7,383 days) with its last recorded observation on 30 October 2021.

== Name ==
When the discovery of Ferdinand was announced, it was given the temporary provisional designation "S/2001 U 2" by the Minor Planet Center. It was later named and given the Roman numeral designation Uranus XXIV by the International Astronomical Union's Working Group for Planetary System Nomenclature on 29 December 2005. The moon was named after Ferdinand, the son of the King of Naples in William Shakespeare's play The Tempest.

== Orbit ==
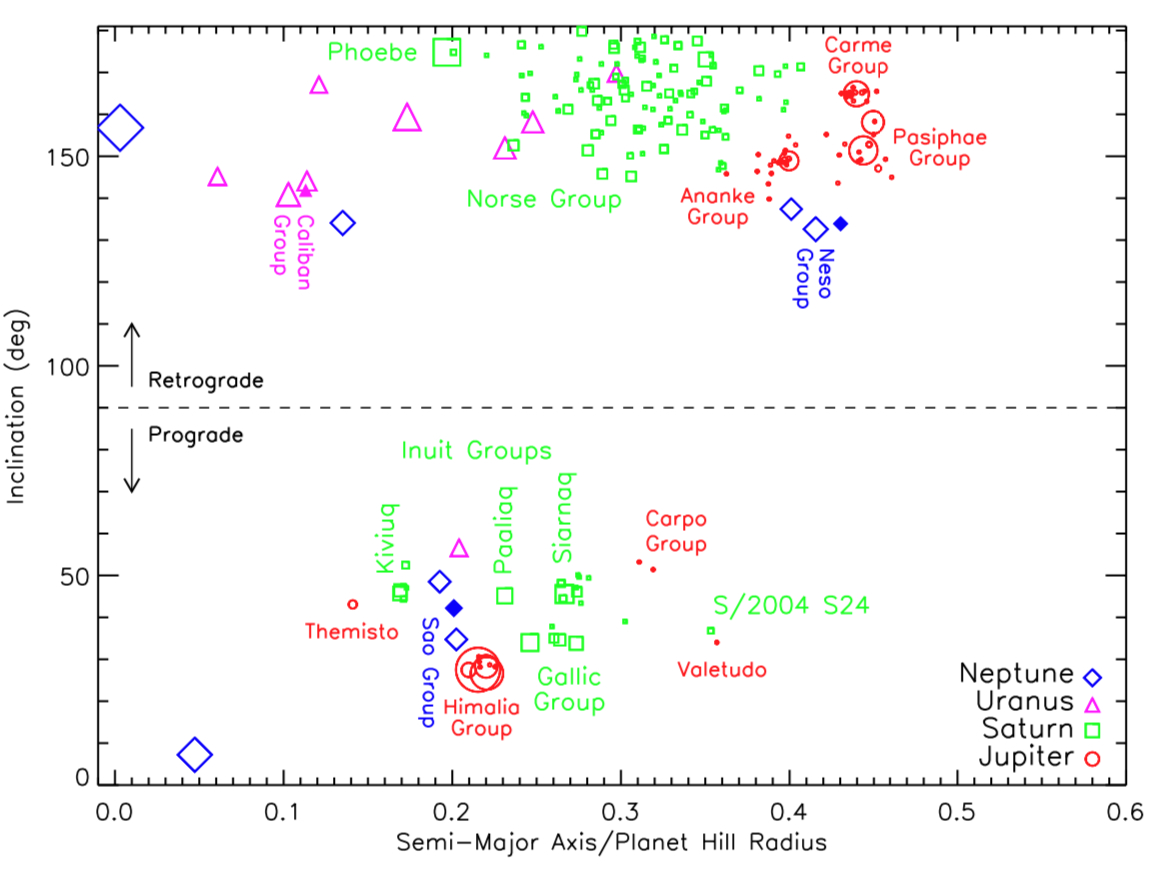
Irregular moons of all four giant planets, plotted by average distance from their planet (semi-major axis in Hill radii) and orbital inclination (degrees with respect to ecliptic). Ferdinand is the outermost irregular moon of Uranus (displayed as the rightmost magenta triangle at the top). Data as of February 2024.

Ferdinand is one of Uranus's irregular moons, which follow wide, eccentric, and inclined orbits in contrast to the regular moons of Uranus. Irregular moons like Ferdinand are thought to have been captured by their planet during the Solar System's formation. The Uranian irregular moons are loosely bound by Uranus's gravity due to their great distance from the planet, which makes their orbits susceptible to gravitational perturbations by the Sun and other planets. This results in significant changes to their orbits over short periods of time, so a simple Keplerian elliptical orbit cannot accurately describe their long-term orbital motions. Instead, proper or mean orbital elements are used to describe the long-term orbits of irregular moons more accurately, since these are calculated by averaging out the perturbed orbit over an extended period of time.

Ferdinand is the outermost known moon of Uranus, having an average semi-major axis of 20.4 million km (12.7 million mi; 0.136 AU) and an average orbital period of 7.63 years (2,788 days). Its orbit occupies 29% of Uranus's Hill radius—a relatively small fraction of the planet's gravitational extent compared to the outermost moons of other giant planets, which orbit near 50% of their planet's Hill radius. (Note: Uranus has a Hill radius of 0.47 AU (70 million km; 44 million mi).) With an average orbital eccentricity of 0.4 and an average inclination of 169° with respect to the ecliptic, Ferdinand follows a retrograde orbit, meaning it moves in the opposite direction to the planet's orbit around the Sun.

Over a 10,000-year time span, Ferdinand's semi-major axis varies from 20.1 to 20.9 million km (12.5 to 13.0 million mi; 0.134 to 0.140 AU) while its orbital period varies from 7.44 to 7.89 years (2,719 to 2,882 days). Ferdinand's eccentricity also varies from 0.31 to 0.49, while its inclination with respect to the ecliptic varies from 167° to 172°. Its orbit exhibits both apsidal and nodal precession with periods of 747 and 1,001 years, respectively. Ferdinand's orbit allows occasional close approaches to Uranus's largest irregular moon, Sycorax, which may gravitationally perturb its orbit.

It is unclear whether Ferdinand belongs to a collisional family of Uranian irregular moons. If Ferdinand were the largest surviving member of such a family, most fragments produced by the original collision would likely have escaped Uranus's gravitational influence due to the moon's great distance from the planet. Studies in the 2000s tentatively grouped Ferdinand with Sycorax, Setebos, and Prospero, as all four moons occupy distant, highly eccentric orbits with semi-major axes exceeding 16 million km (9.9 million mi; 0.11 AU) and eccentricities greater than 0.5. A 2005 study led by Sheppard and collaborators noted that the relative velocities among these moons are comparable to Sycorax's escape velocity of 80 m/s, which could suggest a possible common origin from the collisional disruption of a parent body. However, in his 2005 doctoral thesis, Matija Ćuk pointed out that perturbations by Sycorax had likely altered Ferdinand's orbit, which argues against its inclusion in this group. (Note: Page 15 of Matija Ćuk's thesis reads: "...so we will not assign Trinculo and S/2003 U2 [sic] to new families, although they might have originated from other sources." This is presumably a typo of Ferdinand's provisional designation S/2001 U 2, as "S/2003 U 2" refers to the regular Uranian moon Cupid.)

The orbit of Ferdinand (red) and other Uranian irregular moons (gray) as seen from three different views. Ferdinand's orbit is nearly perpendicular to the plane of Uranus's equator and regular moons (magenta).

== Physical characteristics ==
In red light (R band), Ferdinand appears very faint with an apparent magnitude of 25.1. For this reason, it can only be observed through long-exposure imaging with large-aperture telescopes. Like other Uranian irregular moons, Ferdinand is expected to have a dark surface composed of water ice, hydrated silicates, and organic compounds. Infrared observations by the Herschel Space Observatory detected no significant thermal emission from Ferdinand, indicating it must have a geometric albedo higher than 0.03 and a diameter smaller than 50 km (31 mi). Assuming Ferdinand has a low albedo of 0.04 like other Uranian irregular moons, its brightness implies a diameter of about 20 to 21 km (12 to 13 mi).

Ferdinand's brightness varies periodically as it rotates, which indicates it has an elongated shape. Kepler observations in 2017 measured a brightness variation of 0.54±0.09 magnitudes, implying an equatorial semi-axis ratio (a/b) greater than 1.6. The rotation period of Ferdinand is ambiguous, as it depends on whether its light curve is single-peaked or double-peaked. If Ferdinand's light curve is single-peaked, its rotation period would be 11.84±0.22 hours. If its light curve is double-peaked, then its rotation period would be 23.68±0.50 hours, twice the single-peak period. In either case, Ferdinand rotates the slowest among Uranian irregular moons with known rotation periods.

== Exploration ==
Ferdinand has not been imaged at close range by a space probe. The Uranian irregular moons, including Ferdinand, are planned to be distant observation targets for the proposed Uranus Orbiter and Probe (UOP), which would measure the Uranian irregular moons' rotation periods and shapes by monitoring changes in their brightness over time. However, the UOP may not be able to perform a close flyby of Ferdinand because the moon does not orbit near the ecliptic plane.

== See also ==
- Other Uranian irregular moons discovered in 2001:
  - Francisco
  - Trinculo
  - Margaret (lost in 2001, rediscovered in 2003)
- 2001 QW322 – a wide binary system of Kuiper belt objects discovered during a search for Uranian moons in 2001
