= Bouzaréah =

Coordinates: 36°47′N 3°01′E

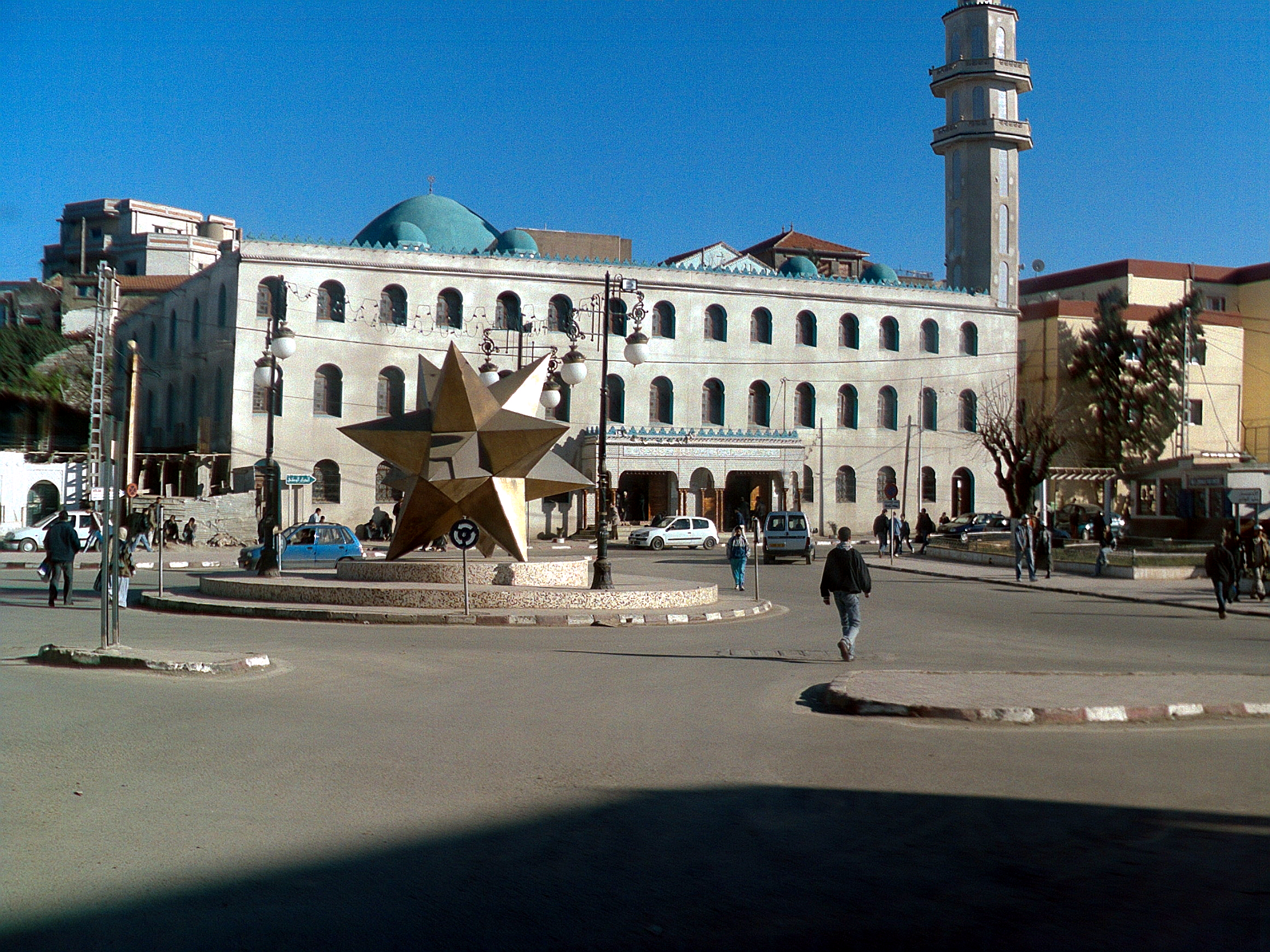

- Country: Algeria
- Province: Algiers
- Time zone: UTC+1 (West Africa Time)

Former Coat of arms during French colonisation

Bouzareah or Bouzaréah (Arabic: بوزريعة, romanized: Būzareah), formerly known as Bouzriah (Arabic: بوزالرياح), is a suburb of Algiers, Algeria. The former name is derived from Arabic and is commonly interpreted as meaning “city of the wind.” Bouzareah is situated at an altitude of over 300 metres above sea level. According to the 1998 census, it had a population of 69,200. The current name is also of Arabic origin and is generally understood to mean “of the grain” or “from the grain.” The district hosts several foreign diplomatic missions, including the embassies of Niger, Oman, and Mauritania.

== Institutions ==
The city is home to several notable institutions:

- The Algerian Space Agency
- The Research center in Astronomy, Astrophysics and Geophysics (CRAAG, former Observatory of Algiers)
- The normal School for Teachers of Algiers-Bouzaréah, created by imperial decree on March 4, 1865
- The Tele Algerian Diffusion
- The broadcast transmitting station of the operator of mobile telephony Djezzy, subsidiary of Orascom Télécom Algeria, which is the largest telephone operator in Algeria.
- The Department of Sciences of Education - the University of Bouzaréah
- The Superior school of Bank
- The basilica Notre Dame d'Afrique
- The forest of Baïnem
- Bologhine Forest

== Asteroid ==
Frederic Sy was a French astronomer who published scientific articles from 1894 to 1918 about comets and asteroids. He worked at the astronomical observatory the Research center in Astronomy, Astrophysique and Geophysics (CRAAG, formerly the Observatory of Algiers) and was a colleague of François Gonnessiat. He discovered two asteroids, which he named:

- "858 El Djezaïr" (Arabic for Algeria and Algiers) on May 26, 1916.
- "859 Bouzaréah" also in 1916.

== Historical population ==
Year	Population
1954	15,600
1987	60,400
1998	69,200
2008	94,203
2016	102,670

== Former coat of arms ==
The first quarter is red, the heraldic color of Africa with a tower to represent a fort located in the city. The second quarter is green, of sinople with a kouba to point out the koubbas of Sidi-Nouman inter alia. With the third district, sinople cypresses to point out the wooded solid mass which covered formerly all the "Bouzaréah". With the fourth district the crescent of Islam with the stars which refer to the Observatory of the Celestial Village on blue of France.

This coat of arms was made by Théo Bruand d' Uzelle in 1993.

== Education ==
El Kalimat School, an English-language international school, is in the commune.
