= Trinculo (moon) =

Irregular moon of Uranus

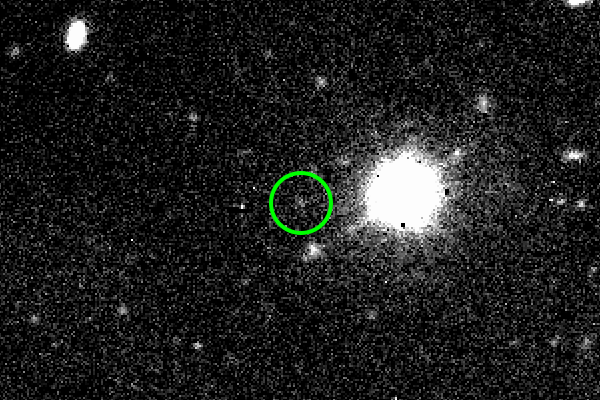
- Very Large Telescope image of Trinculo (circled) next to a bright background star on 3 September 2002

Discovery
- Discovered by: Matthew J. Holman; JJ Kavelaars; Dan Milisavljevic
- Discovery site: Cerro Tololo Obs.
- Discovery date: 13 August 2001

Designations
- Designation: Uranus XXI
- Pronunciation: /ˈtrɪŋkjʊloʊ/
- Named after: Trinculo (The Tempest character)
- Alternative names: S/2001 U 1

Orbital characteristics
- Epoch 1 January 2020 (JD 2458849.5)
- Satellite of: Uranus

Proper orbital elements
- Proper semi-major axis: 8,502,600 km (0.056836 AU)
- Proper eccentricity: 0.220
- Proper inclination: 167.1° (to ecliptic)
- Proper orbital period: 2.05 years (749 d)
- Precession of perihelion long.: 500.579374 arcsec / yr
- Precession of asc. node: 303.868699 arcsec / yr

Physical characteristics
- Mean diameter: 18 km
- Albedo: >0.03
- Spectral type: B–V = 1.09±0.40; V–R = 0.35±0.19
- Apparent magnitude: 25.4 (average)
- Absolute magnitude (H): 12.7; 11.92±0.18

Trinculo, also known as Uranus XXI and previously as S/2001 U 1, is a small irregular moon of Uranus on a very wide and elliptical orbit. It was discovered on 13 August 2001 by Matthew J. Holman, JJ Kavelaars, and Dan Milisavljevic using the 4.0-meter Víctor M. Blanco Telescope at Cerro Tololo Observatory, Chile. It was named after Trinculo, a jester from William Shakespeare's play The Tempest. Trinculo orbits Uranus in the retrograde direction at an average distance of 8.5 million km (5.3 million mi) and takes about 749 Earth days (2.1 Earth years) to complete one orbit. Trinculo is estimated to be about 18 km (11 mi) in diameter and its surface might be dark and gray in color.

== Discovery ==
Trinculo was discovered on 13 August 2001 by a group of astronomers consisting of Matthew J. Holman, JJ Kavelaars, and Dan Milisavljevic, who at the time were searching for distant moons of Uranus. Trinculo was the sixth irregular moon discovered around Uranus. The discovery observations were made at Cerro Tololo Observatory, Chile, using the 4.0-m Víctor M. Blanco Telescope equipped with a wide-field camera. The group identified Trinculo and three other Uranian irregular moons (Francisco, Ferdinand, and Margaret (Note: Margaret ended up lost in 2001, but was rediscovered by Scott Sheppard and David C. Jewitt in 2003.)) in the telescope images by using a computer algorithm that followed the motion of Uranus and then combined the images to enhance the faint moons—a technique known as shift-and-adding. Later images obtained by Kavelaars using the Canada–France–Hawaii Telescope on 25 August 2001 confirmed that Trinculo was orbiting Uranus.

To determine the orbit of Trinculo, the group continued observing the moon from different observatories, including the 200-inch Hale Telescope at Palomar Observatory and 8.2-m Very Large Telescope (VLT) at Paranal Observatory. Brian G. Marsden, director of the Minor Planet Center, helped compute the orbit of Trinculo and provided predictions for its location in 2002. Marsden's predictions allowed Gladman to identify a Uranian moon candidate detected in VLT images taken by Philippe Rousselot and Olivier Mousis on 5 September 2002, which was then confirmed to be Trinculo after Gladman and Tommy Grav investigated images taken earlier by the Blanco telescope on 13 August 2002. The Minor Planet Center announced the discovery of Trinculo on 30 September 2003.

== Name ==
When the discovery of Trinculo was announced, it was given the temporary provisional designation S/2001 U 1 by the Minor Planet Center. It was later named and given the Roman numeral designation Uranus XXI by the International Astronomical Union's Working Group for Planetary System Nomenclature on 29 December 2005. The moon was named after the drunken jester Trinculo from William Shakespeare's play, The Tempest. In a 2014 interview with the Folger Shakespeare Library, Kavelaars remarked that he picked the name because his team was "drunk with power" and that Trinculo's irregular orbit resembled a wandering drunken sailor.

== Orbit ==
Trinculo is an irregular moon of Uranus, which have very wide, elliptical, and inclined orbits in contrast to the regular moons of Uranus. Irregular moons like Trinculo are thought to be former asteroids that were captured by their planet during the Solar System's formation. The Uranian irregular moons are loosely bound by Uranus's gravity because of their great distance from the planet, so their orbits are frequently perturbed by the gravity of the Sun and other planets. This results in significant changes in the orbits of irregular moons over short periods of time, so a simple Keplerian elliptical orbit cannot accurately describe the long-term orbital motions of irregular moons. Instead, proper or mean orbital elements are used to describe the long-term orbits of irregular moons more accurately, since these are calculated by averaging out the perturbed orbit over a long period of time.

Over a 10,000-year time period, Trinculo's average semi-major axis or orbital distance from Uranus is 8.05 million km (5.00 million mi; 0.0538 AU), with an average orbital period of 2.05 years (749 days). Trinculo has an average orbital eccentricity of 0.22 and an average inclination of 167° with respect to the ecliptic, or the plane of Earth's orbit. Since Trinculo's orbital inclination is greater than 90°, the moon has a retrograde orbit, meaning it orbits in the opposite direction of Uranus' orbit around the Sun. Trinculo's orbital elements fluctuate over time due to perturbations: its semi-major axis varies by up to ±12,200 km (7,600 mi), eccentricity varies by ±0.02, and inclination varies by ±1°. Trinculo's orbit exhibits nodal and apsidal precession with average periods of several thousand Earth years. (Note: Brozovic et al. (2022) gives 12,000 and 4,300 years for Trinculo's apsidal and nodal precession periods, respectively. On the other hand, JPL (2024) gives 2,589 and 4,265 years for Trinculo's apsidal and nodal precession periods, respectively.)

The eccentric orbits of Trinculo and other Uranian irregular moons overlap in distance, which leads to the possibility of Trinculo passing close to another irregular moon. Orbit simulations performed by Marina Brozović and Robert Jacobson in 2022 found that Trinculo had approached Sycorax within several tens of thousands of kilometers 9,700 years ago. Trinculo is not known to be part of a collisional family or group; its orbit is apparently unique among the known Uranian irregular moons. If there is a collisional family associated with Trinculo, then any Uranian irregular moons related to it are likely undiscovered because they are presumably small and faint.

Animation of Trinculo's orbit (green) around Uranus.
Uranus · Sycorax · Francisco · Caliban · Stephano · Trinculo

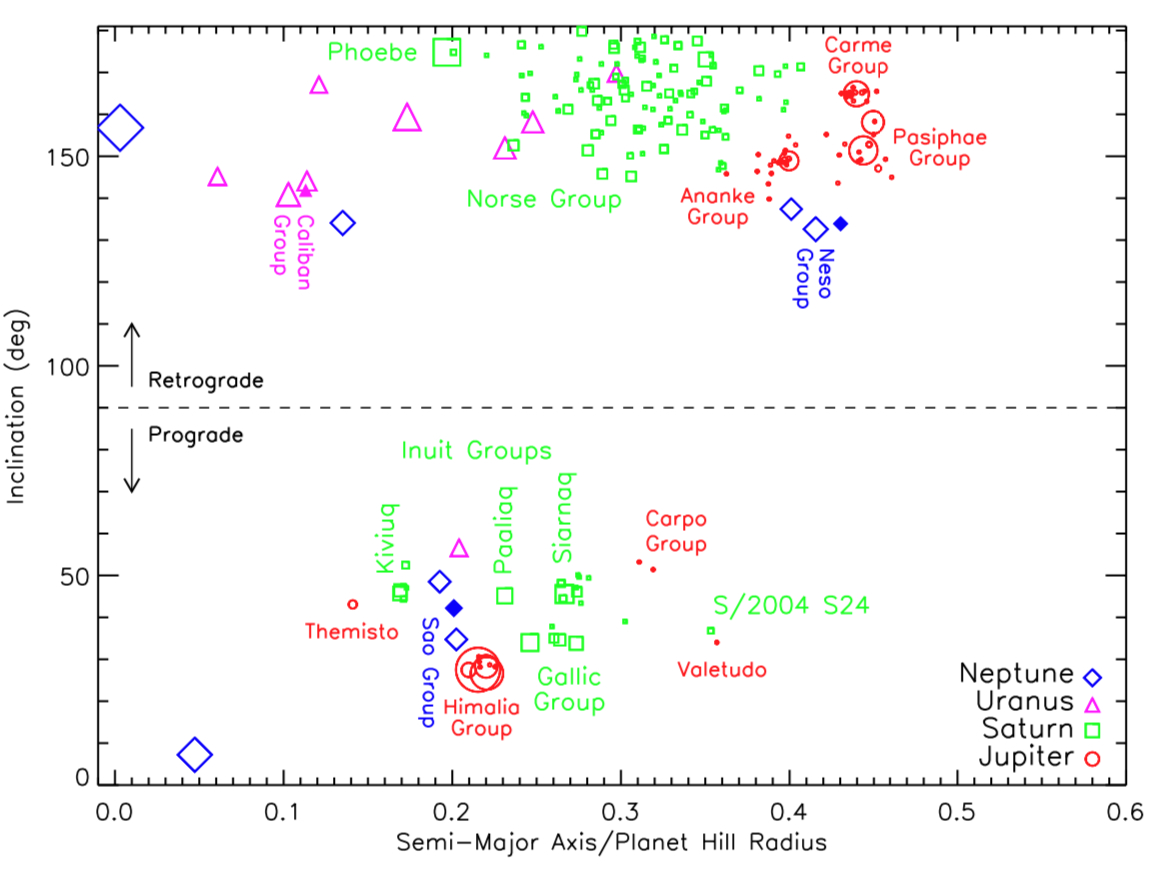
Irregular moons of all four giant planets, plotted by average distance from their planet (semi-major axis in Hill radii) and orbital inclination (in degrees wrt ecliptic). Data as of February 2024.

== Physical characteristics ==
Trinculo is very faint with an average apparent magnitude of 25.4, so it could only be observed through long-exposure imaging by large-aperture telescopes. Trinculo is expected to have a dark surface composed of water ice, hydrated silicates, and organic compounds, similar to other irregular moons. Observations by the Herschel space telescope did not find any significant infrared thermal emission coming from Trinculo, indicating the moon must have a geometric albedo higher than 0.03 and a diameter smaller than 50 km (31 mi). Scott Sheppard, who has discovered many irregular moons around other giant planets, estimates Trinculo's diameter to be 18 km (11 mi).

Observations by the Keck II telescope in 2003 suggest that Trinculo might have a "neutral" or gray color, (Note: An object is "specially neutral" if it reflects a similar proportion of light as the Sun across the visible spectrum, which gives it a colorless or gray appearance.) similar to the larger Uranian irregular moons Prospero and Setebos. Astronomers have attempted to measure Trinculo's rotation period in 2005 by using the Very Large Telescope, but were unable to find any periodic variation in the moon's brightness.

== Exploration ==
Trinculo has not been imaged up close by a space probe. All Uranian irregular moons including Trinculo are planned to be distant observation targets for the proposed Uranus Orbiter and Probe (UOP), which will measure the Uranian irregular moons' rotation periods and shapes by watching their brightness change over time. The UOP may not be able to do a close flyby of Trinculo because the moon does not orbit near the ecliptic plane.

== See also ==
- Other Uranian irregular moons discovered in 2001:
  - Francisco
  - Ferdinand
  - Margaret (lost in 2001, rediscovered in 2003)
- 2001 QW322 – a wide binary system of Kuiper belt objects discovered during a search for Uranian moons in 2001
