= 931 Whittemora =

Main-belt asteroid

Discovery
- Discovered by: F. Gonnessiat
- Discovery site: Algiers Obs.
- Discovery date: 19 March 1920

Designations
- Named after: Thomas Whittemore (American archaeologist)
- Alternative designations: A920 FB · 1920 GU; A904 HB · 1904 HB
- Minor planet category: main-belt (outer); background

Orbital characteristics
- Epoch 31 May 2020 (JD 2459000.5)
- Uncertainty parameter 0
- Observation arc: 115.71 yr (42,264 d)
- Aphelion: 3.9061 AU
- Perihelion: 2.4319 AU
- Semi-major axis: 3.1690 AU
- Eccentricity: 0.2326
- Orbital period (sidereal): 5.64 yr (2,061 d)
- Mean anomaly: 340.57°
- Mean motion: 0° 10^{m} 28.92^{s} / day
- Inclination: 11.484°
- Longitude of ascending node: 111.00°
- Argument of perihelion: 315.45°

Physical characteristics
- Mean diameter: 54±2 km
- Synodic rotation period: 19.199±0.005 h
- Geometric albedo: 0.148±0.007; 0.170±0.050; 0.1704±0.028
- Spectral type: Tholen = M; M0 (Barucci); B–V = 0.700±0.030; U–B = 0.218±0.029
- Absolute magnitude (H): 9.3

931 Whittemora (prov. designation: A920 FB or 1920 GU) is a metallic background asteroid, approximately 46 kilometers (29 miles) in diameter, located in the outer region of the asteroid belt. It was discovered by French astronomer François Gonnessiat at the Algiers Observatory in North Africa on 19 March 1920. The M-type asteroid has a rotation period of 19.2 hours. It was named after American archaeologist Thomas Whittemore (1871–1950).

== Orbit and classification ==
Whittemora is a non-family asteroid of the main belt's background population when applying the hierarchical clustering method to its proper orbital elements. It orbits the Sun in the outer asteroid belt at a distance of 2.4–3.9 AU once every 5 years and 8 months (2,061 days; semi-major axis of 3.17 AU). Its orbit has an eccentricity of 0.23 and an inclination of 11° with respect to the ecliptic.

== Discovery ==
Whittemora was discovered by French astronomer François Gonnessiat at the Algiers Observatory in North Africa on 19 March 1920. Two nights later, it was independently discovered by Karl Reinmuth at the Heidelberg-Königstuhl State Observatory on 21 March 1920. However, the Minor Planet Center only credits Gonnessiat with the discovery. The asteroid was first observed as A904 HB (1904 HB) at Heidelberg on 22 April 1904, where the body's observation arc begins on 21 March 1920.

== Naming ==
This minor planet was named after American scholar and archaeologist Thomas Whittemore (1871–1950), who was professor at both Harvard and Columbia universities. The naming was mentioned in The Names of the Minor Planets by Paul Herget in 1955 (H 90).

== Physical characteristics ==
In the Tholen classification, Whittemora is a metallic M-type asteroid. It is an M0 in the taxonomic classification according to the method used by Barucci (1987).

=== Rotation period ===
In March 2016, a rotational lightcurve of Whittemora was obtained from photometric observations by French and Swiss astronomers Christophe Demeautis, Mickael Porte and Raoul Behrend. Lightcurve analysis gave a rotation period of 19.199±0.005 hours with a brightness variation of 0.25±0.02 magnitude (U=2+). This result supersedes a period determination of 16+ hours by Pierre Antonini from June 2006 (U=2), and of 19.20±0.01 hours with an amplitude of 0.2±0.05 magnitude by John Menke at the Menke Observatory in January 2004 (U=2).

=== Diameter and albedo ===
According to the survey carried out by the Infrared Astronomical Satellite IRAS, the NEOWISE mission of NASA's Wide-field Infrared Survey Explorer (WISE), and the Japanese Akari satellite, Whittemora measures (45.27±3.4), (45.298±0.727) and (48.98±1.01) kilometers in diameter and its surface has an albedo of (0.1704±0.028), (0.170±0.050) and (0.148±0.007), respectively.

The Collaborative Asteroid Lightcurve Link adopts the results from IRAS, that is, an albedo of 0.1704 and a diameter of 45.27 km based on an absolute magnitude of 9.26. Further published mean-diameters and albedos by the WISE team include (40.619±2.021 km) and (56.841±0.673 km) with corresponding albedos of (0.212±0.051), and (0.1085±0.0270). Two asteroid occultations on 1 January 2004 and 12 February 2015, gave a best-fit ellipse dimension of 45.0 × 45.0 and 49.0 × 49.0 kilometers, respectively. These timed observations are taken when the asteroid passes in front of a distant star. However the quality of the measurements are poorly rated.
