= Thomas Whittemore =

American scholar and archaeologist

Thomas Whittemore (January 2, 1871 – June 8, 1950) was an American scholar and archaeologist who founded the Byzantine Institute of America. His close personal relationship with Mustafa Kemal Atatürk, founder and the first president of the Turkish Republic, enabled him to gain permission from the Turkish government to start the preservation of the Hagia Sophia mosaics in 1931.

== Early life ==
Thomas Whittemore was born in the Cambridgeport neighborhood of Cambridge, Massachusetts, on January 2, 1871. He earned a Bachelor of Arts degree in English literature from Tufts College in 1894. He taught English Composition at Tufts for a year and then studied at Harvard Graduate School of Arts and Sciences. He also taught courses in the fine arts at New York University and Columbia University.

== Professional activities ==
From 1911 until his death Whittemore served as American representative on the Egyptian Exploration Fund.

Whittemore worked in various capacities to provide relief to Russian refugees during World War I and following the Russian Revolution. He spent 8 months in Russia in 1915-16 and reported on conditions there when he returned to New York to organized shipments of supplies. He was a member of the U.S.-based Russian Relief Commission and a committee for war relief organized by Grand Duchess Tatiana Nikolaovna.

== Byzantine studies ==
In 1929, Whittemore founded the Byzantine Library of Paris and, in 1930, the Byzantine Institute of America, whose mission was to "conserve, restore, study, and document" the monuments and artworks of the Byzantine world. The list of sponsors of the new venture, according to renowned architectural historian William L. MacDonald, "reads like a who's who of art, aristocracy, and money. Whittemore's message was that Christian art in the Near East, especially in Constantinople, was unknown, utterly magnificent, equal or superior to Western medieval art, and ought to be revealed and understood." In 1931, Whittemore traveled with the institute to Istanbul with the permission of Mustafa Kemal Atatürk to oversee the removal of plaster covering the Byzantine mosaics in Hagia Sophia. Of the radical and sudden transformation of Hagia Sophia from an active mosque to a secular museum in 1931 he wrote: "Santa Sophia was a mosque the day that I talked to him. The next morning, when I went to the mosque, there was a sign on the door written in Ataturk's own hand. It said: 'The museum is closed for repairs'"

In 1934, Harvard University appointed him keeper of Byzantine coins and seals at the Fogg Art Museum for a year. He also accepted a presidential appointment to represent the United States at the Byzantine Conference in Sofia in September of that year.

His work was widely reported in the United States. In 1942, the New York Times noted his return to Istanbul for his "ninth year in uncovering Byzantine mosaics in the St. Sophia Museum".

Beginning in 1948, he sponsored a program for the restoration of the mosaics in the Chora Church in Istanbul.

== Awards and honors ==
- Brown University awarded him an honorary degree of Doctor of Laws in 1950.
- Asteroid 931 Whittemora, discovered by French astronomer François Gonnessiat at Algiers Observatory in March 1920, was named in his honor. The naming was mentioned in The Names of the Minor Planets by Paul Herget in 1955 (H 90).

== Death ==
On June 8, 1950, he suffered a heart attack while visiting the U.S. Department of State in Washington, D.C. He was buried in Mount Auburn Cemetery in Cambridge, Massachusetts.
