= 1714 Sy =

Main-belt asteroid

Discovery
- Discovered by: L. Boyer
- Discovery site: Algiers Obs.
- Discovery date: 25 July 1951

Designations
- Named after: Frédéric Sy (astronomer)
- Alternative designations: 1951 OA · 1949 YM; 1950 DE_{1} · 1951 NM
- Minor planet category: main-belt · (middle)

Orbital characteristics
- Epoch 4 September 2017 (JD 2458000.5)
- Uncertainty parameter 0
- Observation arc: 67.24 yr (24,559 days)
- Aphelion: 2.9621 AU
- Perihelion: 2.1732 AU
- Semi-major axis: 2.5677 AU
- Eccentricity: 0.1536
- Orbital period (sidereal): 4.11 yr (1,503 days)
- Mean anomaly: 50.188°
- Mean motion: 0° 14^{m} 22.56^{s} / day
- Inclination: 7.9715°
- Longitude of ascending node: 300.91°
- Argument of perihelion: 321.00°

Physical characteristics
- Dimensions: 12.39 km (calculated); 13.998±0.881 km
- Geometric albedo: 0.157±0.034; 0.20 (assumed)
- Spectral type: L · S
- Absolute magnitude (H): 11.85±0.29 · 11.9

1714 Sy, provisional designation 1951 OA, is a stony asteroid from the central regions of the asteroid belt, approximately 13 kilometers in diameter. It was discovered on 25 July 1951, by French astronomer Louis Boyer at Algiers Observatory in Algeria, North Africa, and named after French astronomer and orbit computer Frédéric Sy.

== Orbit ==
Sy orbits the Sun in the central main-belt at a distance of 2.2–3.0 AU once every 4 years and 1 month (1,503 days). Its orbit has an eccentricity of 0.15 and an inclination of 8° with respect to the ecliptic.

It was first identified as 1949 YM at Goethe Link Observatory in 1948, extending the body's observation arc by 3 years prior to its official discovery observation at Algiers.

== Physical characteristics ==
PanSTARRS' large-scale survey characterized Sy as a L-type asteroid, a rare subtype which falls into the broader complex of stony S-type asteroids.

=== Diameter and albedo ===
According to the survey carried out by NASA's Wide-field Infrared Survey Explorer with its subsequent NEOWISE mission, Sy measures 13.998 kilometers in diameter, and its surface has an albedo of 0.157, while the Collaborative Asteroid Lightcurve Link assumes a standard albedo for stony asteroids of 0.20 and calculates a diameter of 12.39 kilometers with on an absolute magnitude of 11.9.

=== Photometry ===
In March 2012, photometric observations at the Oakley Southern Sky Observatory (E09), Australia, included this asteroid as a target. Due to rain and cloud coverage, no lightcurve could be constructed, and therefore no rotation period could be derived. However the 86 photometric data points allowed to find a maximum brightness variation of 0.95 magnitude (U=none). A high brightness amplitude of 0.95 is a strong indicator, that the body has a non-spheroidal shape. As of 2017, Sy's rotation period still remains unknown.

== Naming ==
This minor planet was named after Frédéric Sy, who worked as a human orbit computer and as an assistant astronomer at Algiers and Paris Observatory, respectively. At Algiers Observatory, he observed asteroids and comets and was the first to discoverer a numbered minor planet, 858 El Djezaïr, in 1916. The official naming citation was published by the Minor Planet Center on 1 August 1978 (M.P.C. 4419).
