= Trinculo =

Trinculo can refer to:

- Trinculo, a character in William Shakespeare's play The Tempest.
- Trinculo (moon), a natural satellite of Uranus.
- Trinculo, a crater on Miranda, which is also a natural satellite of Uranus.
