= Cosette (disambiguation) =

Cosette may refer to:

- Cosette, a fictional character in the novel Les Misérables by Victor Hugo
- Cosette Lee (1910 – 1976), Canadian actress
- Cosette Simon (born 1953), American politician, mayor of Ft. Wayne, Indiana
- 915 Cosette, an S-type asteroid belonging to the Flora family of Main Belt asteroids
- Cosette, French "yé-yé" singer
- Cosette (given name)
