= Byzantine Institute of America =

Preservation organization for Byzantine art USA

The Byzantine Institute of America is an organization founded for the preservation of Byzantine art and architecture.

== History ==
Working with the Turkish government and President Mustafa Kemal Atatürk, its greatest notable success is the preservation of the mosaics in Hagia Sophia starting in June 1931. The institute is located in the Dumbarton Oaks Research Library and Collection, in Washington, D.C. The institute's founder was the scholar and archaeologist Thomas Whittemore.
