= Frédéric Sy =

French astronomer (1861–1917)

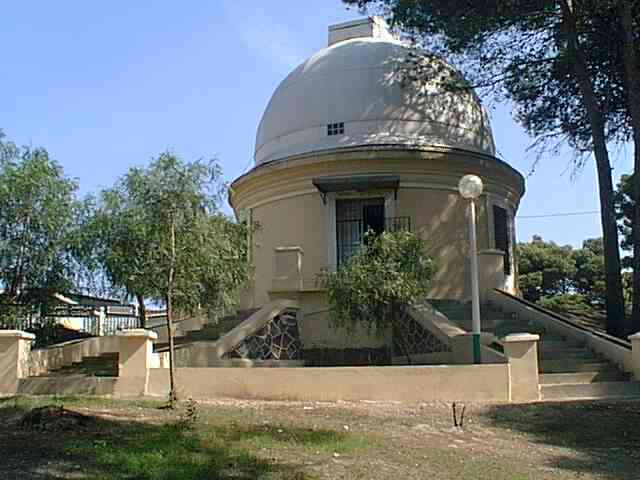
The Algiers Observatory where Sy made his two discoveries in 1916

Asteroids discovered: 2
858 El Djezaïr	26 May 1916	MPC
859 Bouzaréah	2 October 1916	MPC

Frédéric Sy (1861-1917) was a French astronomer and a discoverer of minor planets.

He worked at the Paris Observatory from 1879 to 1887, and as the assistant astronomer at the Algiers Observatory, North Africa, from 1887 to 1918. While working in Algiers he published extensively on the subjects of minor asteroids and comets, and was a colleague of astronomer François Gonnessiat.

Sy was responsible for the discovery and naming of two asteroids, 858 El Djezaïr and 859 Bouzaréah. The names were drawn from locations near the discovering Algiers Observatory.

He was awarded the Valz Prize (Prix Valz) in 1919 by the French Academy of Sciences. The asteroid 1714 Sy was named after him in 1951.
