= 1177 Gonnessia =

Main-belt asteroid

Discovery
- Discovered by: L. Boyer
- Discovery site: Algiers Obs.
- Discovery date: 24 November 1930

Designations
- Named after: François Gonnessiat (French astronomer)
- Alternative designations: 1930 WA · A923 RO
- Minor planet category: main-belt · (outer)

Orbital characteristics
- Epoch 4 September 2017 (JD 2458000.5)
- Uncertainty parameter 0
- Observation arc: 86.28 yr (31,513 days)
- Aphelion: 3.4519 AU
- Perihelion: 3.2440 AU
- Semi-major axis: 3.3480 AU
- Eccentricity: 0.0310
- Orbital period (sidereal): 6.13 yr (2,238 days)
- Mean anomaly: 344.46°
- Mean motion: 0° 9^{m} 39.24^{s} / day
- Inclination: 15.071°
- Longitude of ascending node: 252.16°
- Argument of perihelion: 241.85°

Physical characteristics
- Dimensions: 91.98±9.9 km 93.50±1.01 km 99.27±43.41 km 104.63±33.73 km
- Synodic rotation period: 6.81±0.01 h (poor); 10 h 28.89±0.02 h 30.51±0.02 h 30.51 h (Note: Pravec (2011) web: rotation period 30.51 hours with a brightness amplitude of 0.1 mag in August 2008. Period was fixed at Stephens' value. Absolute magnitude of 8.86. mag. Summary figures for (1177) Gonnessia at Collaborative Asteroid Lightcurve Link and Ondrejov Asteroid Photometry Project); 82±5 h (Note: Lightcurve plot of 1177 Gonnessia, from the Palmer Divide Observatory, by Brian D. Warner (2002))
- Geometric albedo: 0.03±0.02; 0.03±0.04; 0.0398±0.010; 0.040±0.001
- Spectral type: Tholen = XFU · X B–V = 0.668; U–B = 0.244
- Absolute magnitude (H): 8.86±0.13 (R) · 9.24 · 9.24±0.139 · 9.30 · 9.35 · 9.4 · 9.66±0.60

1177 Gonnessia, provisional designation 1930 WA, is a dark background asteroid from the outer regions of the asteroid belt, approximately 99 kilometers in diameter. It was discovered on 24 November 1930, by French astronomer Louis Boyer at the Algiers Observatory in Algeria, North Africa, and named after astronomer François Gonnessiat.

== Orbit and classification ==
Gonnessia is not a member of any known asteroid family. It orbits the Sun in the outer main-belt at a distance of 3.2–3.5 AU once every 6 years and 2 months (2,238 days). Its orbit has an eccentricity of 0.03 and an inclination of 15° with respect to the ecliptic.

The asteroid was first observed as A923 RO at Simeiz Observatory in September 1923. The body's observation arc begins at Heidelberg Observatory, three weeks after its official discovery observation at Algiers Bouzaréah.

== Physical characteristics ==
In the Tholen classification, Gonnessia is classified as an asteroid with an unusual spectrum (XFU). It was also characterized as an X-type asteroid by PanSTARRS photometric survey.

=== Lightcurve photometry ===
Several rotational lightcurves of Gonnessia were obtained since 2002. The best rated photometric observations were taken in 2010, by American astronomer Robert Stephens at the Goat Mountain Astronomical Research Station (G79) and Santana Observatory (646) in California. Lightcurve analysis gave a rotation period of 30.51 hours with a brightness amplitude of 0.10 magnitude, indicative for a spheroidal shape (U=3-/3-). Previous observations by Brian Warner gave a longer period of 82 hours based on sparse photometry (U=2-). While not being a slow rotator, Gonnessia has a notably slower spin rate than most asteroids.

=== Diameter and albedo ===
According to the surveys carried out by the Infrared Astronomical Satellite IRAS, the Japanese Akari satellite and the NEOWISE mission of NASA's Wide-field Infrared Survey Explorer, Gonnessia measures between 91.98 and 104.63 kilometers in diameter and its surface has an albedo between 0.03 and 0.040.

The Collaborative Asteroid Lightcurve Link adopts the results obtained by IRAS, that is an albedo of 0.0398 with a diameter of 91.98 kilometers. It also takes Petr Pravec's revised absolute magnitude from WISE of 9.24.

== Naming ==
This minor planet was named after astronomer François Gonnessiat (1856–1934), who was an observer of comets and a discoverer of minor planets. Gonnessiat was also a director of the discovering Algiers Observatory and headed the Quito Astronomical Observatory in Ecuador as well. The official naming citation was mentioned in The Names of the Minor Planets by Paul Herget in 1955 (H 109).
