= Margaret (moon) =

Irregular moon of Uranus

- Margaret (circled) photographed by the Gemini North telescope on 28 September 2003

Discovery
- Discovered by: Scott S. Sheppard; David C. Jewitt
- Discovery site: Mauna Kea Obs.
- Discovery date: 29 August 2003

Designations
- Designation: Uranus XXIII
- Pronunciation: /ˈmɑːrɡərət/
- Named after: Margaret (Much Ado About Nothing character)
- Alternative names: S/2003 U 3
- Adjectives: Margaretian /ˌmɑːrɡəˈrɛtiən/ (trad.)

Orbital characteristics (range) (Note: Sheppard et al. (2024) give the mean, minimum, and maximum values for Margaret's osculating orbital elements in Table 5: semi-major axis 14425000+113500 −106500 km, eccentricity 0.64+0.25 −0.23, inclination 61°+8° −15° with respect to the ecliptic, and orbital period 1655+20 −18. The error bars represent the difference between the minimum/maximum value and the average value over a 10,000-year period.)
- Observation arc: 20.32 years (7,421 d)
- Earliest precovery date: 13 August 2001
- Semi-major axis: 14,318,500 to 14,538,500 km (0.095713 to 0.097184 AU)
- Eccentricity: 0.41 to 0.89
- Orbital period (sidereal): 4.48 to 4.59 years (1,637 to 1,675 d)
- Inclination: 46° to 69° (to ecliptic)
- Satellite of: Uranus
- Group: None known

Proper orbital elements (average) (Note: The proper orbital elements of Margaret listed in the infobox are average (mean) values over a 10,000-year period, as shown in Table 5 of Sheppard et al. (2024) and Jet Propulsion Laboratory's Planetary Satellite Mean Elements table.)
- Proper semi-major axis: 14,425,000 km (0.09643 AU)
- Proper eccentricity: 0.642
- Proper inclination: 60.5° (to ecliptic)
- Proper orbital period: 4.53 years (1,655 d)
- Precession of asc. node: 1293.41317365 arcsec / yr

Physical characteristics
- Mean diameter: 20 km
- Apparent magnitude: 25.2 (R-band)
- Absolute magnitude (H): 12.67

Margaret, also known as Uranus XXIII and previously as S/2003 U 3, is an irregular moon of Uranus. It is the only known irregular moon of Uranus that follows a prograde orbit, meaning it orbits in the same direction as the planet's orbit around the Sun. It was discovered by Scott S. Sheppard and David C. Jewitt at Mauna Kea Observatory on 29 August 2003, although it had been briefly observed earlier by Matthew J. Holman and JJ Kavelaars on 13 August 2001. The moon is formally named after Margaret, the servant of Hero in William Shakespeare's play Much Ado About Nothing, while also alluding to the discoverers' family members.

Margaret follows a distant, highly inclined, and eccentric orbit around Uranus, revolving at an average distance of 14.4 million km (8.9 million mi) with an orbital period of 4.53 years (1,655 days). It has one of the most eccentric orbits of any known moon in the Solar System. The Sun's gravitational influence places the moon in the Kozai resonance, which causes large, synchronized variations in its orbital eccentricity and inclination over a 500-year period. Margaret is estimated to have a diameter of 20 km (12 mi), though most of its physical properties are unknown.

== Discovery ==
Margaret was initially spotted on 13 August 2001 by astronomers Matthew J. Holman and JJ Kavelaars, during their search for distant moons of Uranus at Cerro Tololo Inter-American Observatory. The group had planned to reobserve Margaret by September, (Note: Follow-up observations of Holman and Kavelaars's Uranian moon discoveries took place in September 2001, beginning with the Hale Telescope at Palomar Observatory.) but poor observational circumstances prevented them from doing so. (Note: According to Kavelaars and colleagues, "Uranus set before images deep enough to recover S/2003 U3 [Margaret] could be made.") With only one night of observations, the moon's orbit could not be determined and it became lost.

Margaret was not spotted again until 29 August 2003, when Scott S. Sheppard and David C. Jewitt began searching for Uranian moons using the 8.3-meter (27 ft) Subaru Telescope at Mauna Kea Observatory. After they reobserved Margaret with Mauna Kea's Gemini North telescope on 20 September, the head of the Minor Planet Center, Brian G. Marsden, recognized that it was the same moon observed by Holman and Kavelaars in 2001. Kavelaars confirmed Marsden's suspicion after he identified a single Canada–France–Hawaii Telescope image of Margaret from 25 August 2001. Once follow-up observations ended on 30 September 2003, the Minor Planet Center announced the discovery of Margaret on 7 October. NASA and the International Astronomical Union consider Sheppard and Jewitt as the official discoverers of Margaret.

For several years after its discovery, Margaret remained poorly observed and still had an uncertain orbit, which put it at risk of being lost again. To improve the understanding of its orbit, a team led by Robert A. Jacobson and Marina Brozović conducted a campaign to reobserve Margaret and several other poorly observed moons from 2009 to 2011. Despite these observations, Margaret's orbital uncertainty persisted and remained unobserved until 8 September 2021, when Sheppard began another search for Uranian moons with the Subaru Telescope. As of 2026, Margaret's observation arc spans 20.32 years (7,421 days) with its last recorded observation on 7 December 2021.

== Name ==
When the discovery of Margaret was announced, it was given the temporary provisional designation "S/2003 U 3" by the Minor Planet Center. It was later named and given the Roman numeral designation Uranus XXIII by the International Astronomical Union's Working Group for Planetary System Nomenclature on 29 December 2005. The moon was named after the servant of Hero from William Shakespeare's play, Much Ado About Nothing.

In a 2014 interview with the Folger Shakespeare Library, Sheppard disclosed that he chose the name "Margaret" because it matched his mother's name. He got the idea of naming a moon after his mother when he searched up her name on the Web in 2002. Kavelaars, who initially spotted Margaret in 2001, supported Sheppard's name choice because it matched the middle name of his elder daughter, Ruth Ann Margaret Kavelaars.

== Orbit ==
Margaret is one of Uranus's irregular moons, which follow wide, eccentric, and inclined orbits in contrast to the regular moons of Uranus. It is the only known prograde irregular moon of Uranus, orbiting in the same direction as the planet's orbit around the Sun. Irregular moons like Margaret are thought to have been captured by their planet during the Solar System's formation, although the exact process for this is uncertain. Simulations by Matija Ćuk and Brett Gladman in 2006 showed that prograde irregular moons like Margaret could have been directly captured by Uranus if their orbits became stabilized by a 1:2 orbital resonance between Saturn and Uranus.

The Uranian irregular moons are loosely bound by Uranus's gravity due to their great distance from the planet, which makes their orbits susceptible to gravitational perturbations by the Sun and other planets. This results in significant changes to their orbits over short periods of time, so a simple Keplerian elliptical orbit cannot accurately describe their long-term orbital motions. Instead, proper or mean orbital elements are used to describe the long-term orbits of irregular moons more accurately, since these are calculated by averaging out the perturbed orbit over an extended period of time.

Over a 10,000-year time span, Margaret's semi-major axis from Uranus averages at about 14.4 million km (8.9 million mi; 0.096 AU), with an average orbital period of 4.53 years (1,655 days). Its orbit is markedly more eccentric and inclined compared to other Uranian irregular moons, having an average eccentricity of 0.64 and an average inclination of 61° with respect to the ecliptic. Compared to other known moons of the Solar System as of 2026, Margaret has the fifth-highest average orbital eccentricity.

The orbits Uranus's irregular moons as seen from three different views. Margaret's orbit is colored blue, retrograde irregular moon orbits are colored red, and regular moon orbits are colored magenta.

=== Kozai resonance ===
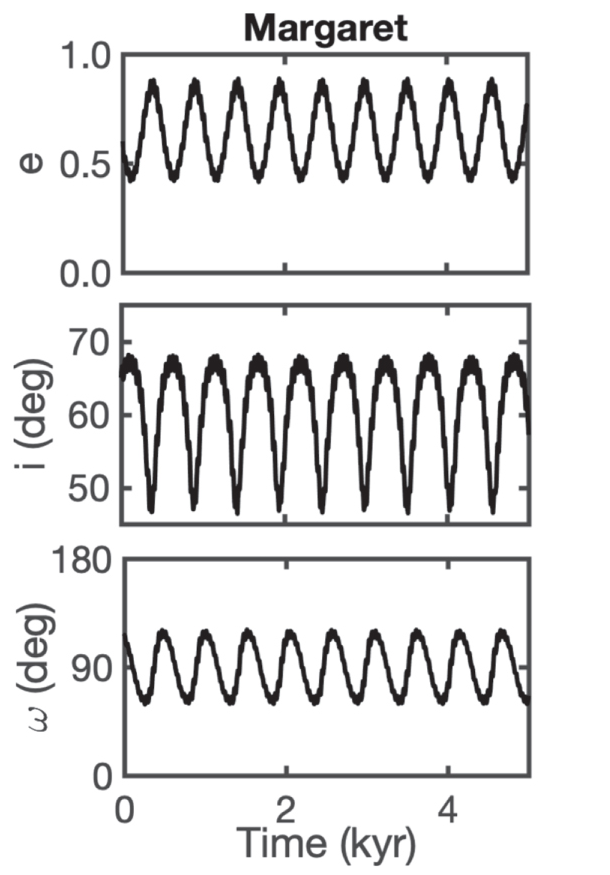
Plots showing periodic oscillations in Margaret's orbital eccentricity (e), inclination (i), and argument of pericenter (ω) over 5,000 years

Margaret's high inclination subjects it to the Kozai resonance, a dynamical phenomenon in which its orbit periodically exchanges inclination and eccentricity due to perturbations by the Sun. The moon's Kozai-resonant orbit was first recognized by Kavelaars and colleagues in 2004. N-body simulations show that over a period of about 520 years, (Note: Although Brozović and Jacobson (2022) do not explicitly give the oscillation period for Margaret's eccentricity and inclination, they do mention that they are correlated with Margaret's argument of pericenter libration, which has a period of ~520 years. This can be seen in Figure 5 of their paper.) Margaret's eccentricity oscillates from 0.41 to 0.89, while its inclination oscillates from 69° to 46°. Due to the Kozai resonance, Margaret reaches minimum inclination at maximum eccentricity and vice versa. (Note: In other words, the inclination and eccentricity of Margaret are out of phase.) When near maximum eccentricity, Margaret can come within 1.7 million km (1.1 million mi; 0.011 AU) of Uranus at periapsis (Note: For comparison, Uranus's outermost regular moon Oberon orbits with a semi-major axis of 583,511 km (362,577 mi), about 3 times closer to Uranus than Margaret's minimum periapsis distance.) and can stray as far as 27 million km (17 million mi; 0.18 AU) at apoapsis.

Despite its large variations in eccentricity and inclination, Margaret's current orbit is considered stable under the Kozai resonance. However, its high inclination puts it near the edge of stability; if it had an average inclination greater than 60°, the Kozai resonance would cause Margaret's eccentricity to grow so large that it would end up getting ejected or colliding with Uranus. Jet Propulsion Laboratory astrophysicists Marina Brozović and Robert A. Jacobson speculated in 2009 that Margaret may become ejected from the Uranus system in the far future.

Margaret's orbit exhibits nodal precession over a 1,002-year period, but does not exhibit apsidal precession due to the Kozai resonance. Instead of circulating from 0° to 360°, Margaret's argument of pericenter librates around 90° with a 520-year period. This means the moon always comes to periapsis above the ecliptic. (Note: Figures 10 and 11 of Sheppard et al. (2024) demonstrate that the vertical position of a moon's periapsis (e sin(ω), the vertical component of the eccentricity vector pointing from apoapsis to periapsis) is always positive (above the ecliptic) when its argument of pericenter (ω) librates around 90°. For an explanation of e sin(ω), see Brozović and Jacobson (2022).)

Evolution of Margaret's orbital eccentricity (blue), inclination (orange), argument of pericenter (green), and periapsis distance from Uranus (red) from 1600 to 2400.

Sped-up simulation of Margaret's orbit around Uranus, from 1600 to 2400. While Margaret's orbit nodally precesses, it also changes shape due to the Kozai resonance.

== Physical characteristics ==
In red light (R band), Margaret appears very faint with an apparent magnitude of 25.2. It can only be observed through long-exposure imaging by large-aperture telescopes. Little is definitively known about Margaret's physical properties other than its absolute magnitude of 12.7, which can be used to estimate the moon's diameter. Assuming Margaret has a low geometric albedo of 0.04 like other Uranian irregular moons, its diameter has been estimated to be 20 km (12 mi). Like these moons, Margaret is expected to have a dark surface composed of water ice, hydrated silicates, and organic compounds.

== Exploration ==
Margaret has not been imaged at close range by a space probe. When NASA's Voyager 2 space probe flew by Uranus in 1986, it coincidentally passed within 15 million km (9.3 million mi) of Margaret. The Uranian irregular moons, including Margaret, are planned to be distant observation targets for the proposed Uranus Orbiter and Probe (UOP), which would measure the Uranian irregular moons' rotation periods and shapes by monitoring their brightness change over time. However, the UOP may not be able to perform a close flyby of Margaret because the moon does not orbit near the ecliptic plane.

== See also ==
- Ferdinand – another moon of Uranus lost in 2001 and recovered in 2003
- Other Uranian moons discovered in 2003:
  - Mab
  - Cupid
- Carpo – a Kozai-resonant moon of Jupiter with a highly inclined and eccentric prograde orbit, similar to Margaret
