= 859 Bouzaréah =

Main-belt asteroid

Discovery
- Discovered by: F. Sy
- Discovery site: Algiers Observatory
- Discovery date: 2 October 1916

Designations
- Named after: Bouzaréah
- Alternative designations: 1916 c · 1928 YA; A916 UN
- Minor planet category: main-belt (outer)

Orbital characteristics
- Epoch 31 July 2016 (JD 2457600.5)
- Uncertainty parameter 0
- Observation arc: 99.57 yr (36368 days)
- Aphelion: 3.5698 AU (534.03 Gm)
- Perihelion: 2.8869 AU (431.87 Gm)
- Semi-major axis: 3.2284 AU (482.96 Gm)
- Eccentricity: 0.10577
- Orbital period (sidereal): 5.80 yr (2118.7 d)
- Mean anomaly: 81.403°
- Mean motion: 0° 10^{m} 11.712^{s} / day
- Inclination: 13.511°
- Longitude of ascending node: 35.800°
- Argument of perihelion: 18.654°

Physical characteristics
- Mean diameter: 66±6 km 67±6 km
- Synodic rotation period: 23.2 h (0.97 d)
- Geometric albedo: 0.0467±0.003
- Absolute magnitude (H): 9.7

859 Bouzaréah, provisional designation 1916 c, is a dark asteroid from the asteroid belt about 74 kilometers in diameter. It was discovered by French astronomer Frédéric Sy at the Algiers Observatory in Algeria, North Africa, on 2 October 1916.

The asteroid orbits the Sun at a distance of 2.9–3.6 AU about once every 6 years (2,117 days) and rotates around its axis in 23 hours. Its low geometric albedo of 0.047 has been measured by the Infrared Astronomical Satellite, IRAS.

The asteroid was named after Bouzaréah, location of the discovering observatory and suburb of the Algerian capital, Algiers. Its designation, 1916 c, is a superseded version of the modern two-letter code system of provisional designation, implemented just a few years later in 1925.
