= 915 Cosette =

Main-belt asteroid

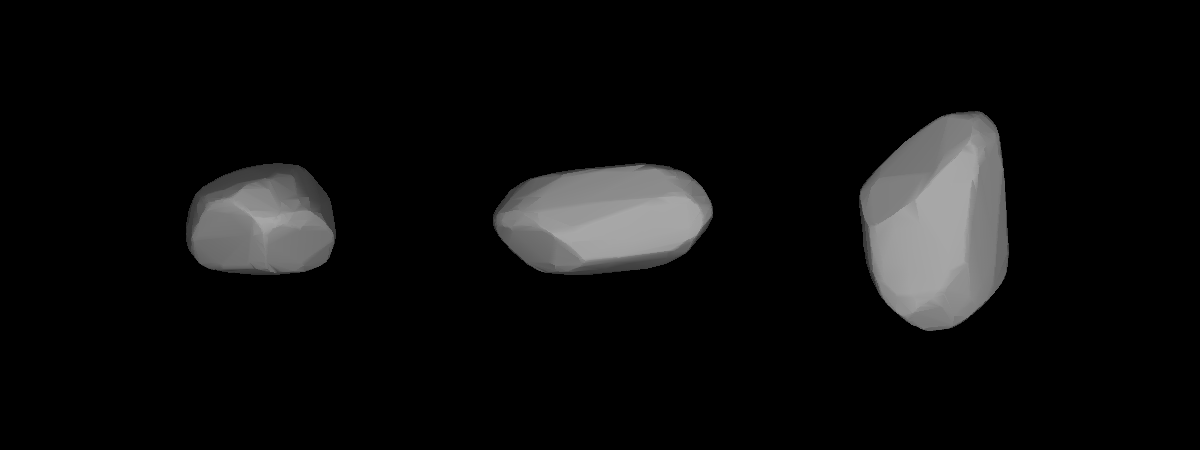
- A three-dimensional model of 915 Cosette based on its light curve

Discovery
- Discovered by: F. Gonnessiat
- Discovery site: Algiers
- Discovery date: 14 December 1918

Designations
- Alternative designations: 1918 b; 1933 FB2

Orbital characteristics
- Epoch 31 July 2016 (JD 2457600.5)
- Uncertainty parameter 0
- Observation arc: 97.34 yr (35552 days)
- Aphelion: 2.5394 AU (379.89 Gm)
- Perihelion: 1.9162 AU (286.66 Gm)
- Semi-major axis: 2.2278 AU (333.27 Gm)
- Eccentricity: 0.13987
- Orbital period (sidereal): 3.33 yr (1214.6 d)
- Mean anomaly: 159.63°
- Mean motion: 0° 17^{m} 47.04^{s} / day
- Inclination: 5.5465°
- Longitude of ascending node: 9.3442°
- Argument of perihelion: 39.577°
- Earth MOID: 0.927919 AU (138.8147 Gm)
- Jupiter MOID: 2.8317 AU (423.62 Gm)
- T_{Jupiter}: 3.625

Physical characteristics
- Synodic rotation period: 4.445 h (0.1852 d)
- Absolute magnitude (H): 11.5

915 Cosette is an S-type asteroid belonging to the Flora family of Main Belt asteroids. Its rotation period is 4.445 hours.
