= 858 El Djezaïr =

Main-belt asteroid

Discovery
- Discovered by: F. Sy
- Discovery site: Algiers Observatory
- Discovery date: 26 May 1916

Designations
- Pronunciation: /ɛlˌdʒɛzɑːˈɪər/ el-JEZ-ah-EER
- Named after: Algiers (Arabic name)
- Alternative designations: 1916 a · A908 UC; A911 HE
- Minor planet category: main-belt

Orbital characteristics
- Epoch 31 July 2016 (JD 2457600.5)
- Uncertainty parameter 0
- Observation arc: 106.80 yr (39010 days)
- Aphelion: 3.0983 AU (463.50 Gm)
- Perihelion: 2.5252 AU (377.76 Gm)
- Semi-major axis: 2.8118 AU (420.64 Gm)
- Eccentricity: 0.10192
- Orbital period (sidereal): 4.71 yr (1722.1 d)
- Mean anomaly: 102.29°
- Mean motion: 0° 12^{m} 32.544^{s} / day
- Inclination: 8.8726°
- Longitude of ascending node: 67.197°
- Argument of perihelion: 179.05°
- Earth MOID: 1.51148 AU (226.114 Gm)
- Jupiter MOID: 1.9171 AU (286.79 Gm)
- T_{Jupiter}: 3.296

Physical characteristics
- Mean radius: 11.755±1.3 km
- Synodic rotation period: 22.31 h (0.930 d)
- Geometric albedo: 0.3197±0.085
- Spectral type: Tholen = S
- Absolute magnitude (H): 10.2

858 El Djezaïr (/ɛlˌdʒɛzɑːˈɪər/ el-JEZ-ah-EER) is a stony asteroid from the asteroid belt, about 24 kilometers in diameter. It was discovered on 26 May 1916, by French astronomer Frédéric Sy at the Algiers Observatory in Algeria, North Africa, and given the provisional designation 1916 a.

The asteroid orbits the Sun at a distance of 2.5–3.1 AU once every 4.71 years (1,722 days). The bright S-type asteroid has a very high geometric albedo of 0.32. Its rotation period has been measured to take 22 hours and 20 minutes. Along with the asteroids 68 Leto and 236 Honoria, it is a member of the Leto family, a small, well-defined group of asteroids, all with a semi-major axis of close to 2.8 AU.

El Djezaïr is the French spelling of the Arabic name for Algiers and Algeria (الجزائر), literally meaning 'the Islands'. The asteroid was the first minor planet to receive a name that consists of more than one word. Its designation, 1916 a, is a superseded version of the modern two-letter code system of provisional designation, implemented just a few years later in 1925.
