= 236 Honoria =

Main-belt asteroid

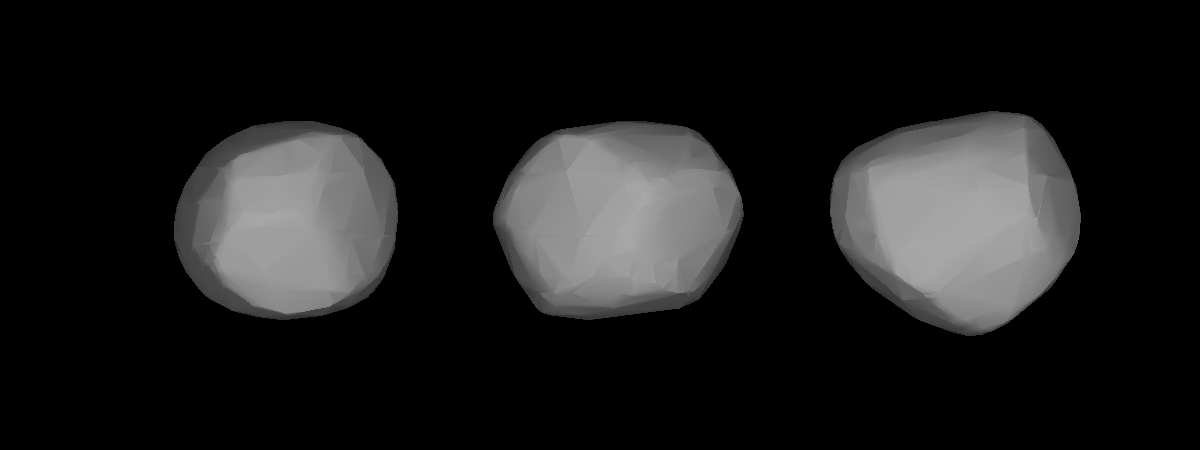
- Lightcurve-based 3D model of 236 Honoria

Discovery
- Discovered by: Johann Palisa
- Discovery date: 26 April 1884

Designations
- Pronunciation: /hɒˈnɔːriə/
- Named after: Justa Grata Honoria
- Alternative designations: A884 HA, 1904 PA; 1930 KK ,1953 GJ_{1}
- Minor planet category: Main belt

Orbital characteristics
- Epoch 31 July 2016 (JD 2457600.5)
- Uncertainty parameter 0
- Observation arc: 131.97 yr (48201 d)
- Aphelion: 3.3307 AU (498.27 Gm)
- Perihelion: 2.2651 AU (338.85 Gm)
- Semi-major axis: 2.79787 AU (418.555 Gm)
- Eccentricity: 0.19042
- Orbital period (sidereal): 4.68 yr (1709.4 d)
- Average orbital speed: 17.8 km/s
- Mean anomaly: 294.554°
- Mean motion: 0° 12^{m} 38.16^{s} / day
- Inclination: 7.6942°
- Longitude of ascending node: 185.861°
- Argument of perihelion: 174.872°

Physical characteristics
- Dimensions: 86.20±3.7 km
- Mass: (1.24±0.36)×10^{18} kg (Note: Calculated from its standard gravitational parameter GM = 0.083±0.024 km^{3}/s^{2}.)
- Mean density: 5.05 g/cm^{3} (Note: Assuming a diameter of 77.7 km.)
- Synodic rotation period: 12.336 h (0.5140 d)
- Geometric albedo: 0.1271±0.012
- Spectral type: S
- Absolute magnitude (H): 8.18

236 Honoria is a large main belt asteroid that was discovered by Austrian astronomer Johann Palisa on 26 April 1884 in Vienna. The asteroid was named after Honoria, granddaughter of the Roman Emperor Theodosius I, who started negotiations with Attila the Hun. It is classified as a stony S-type asteroid based upon its spectrum. 236 Honoria is orbiting close to a 5:2 mean motion resonance with Jupiter, which is located at 2.824 AU.

Polarimetric study of this asteroid reveals anomalous properties that suggests the regolith consists of a mixture of low and high albedo material. This may have been caused by fragmentation of an asteroid substrate with the spectral properties of CO3/CV3 carbonaceous chondrites.
