= 2001 QW322 =

Ultrawide binary Kuiper belt object

2001 QW_{322}
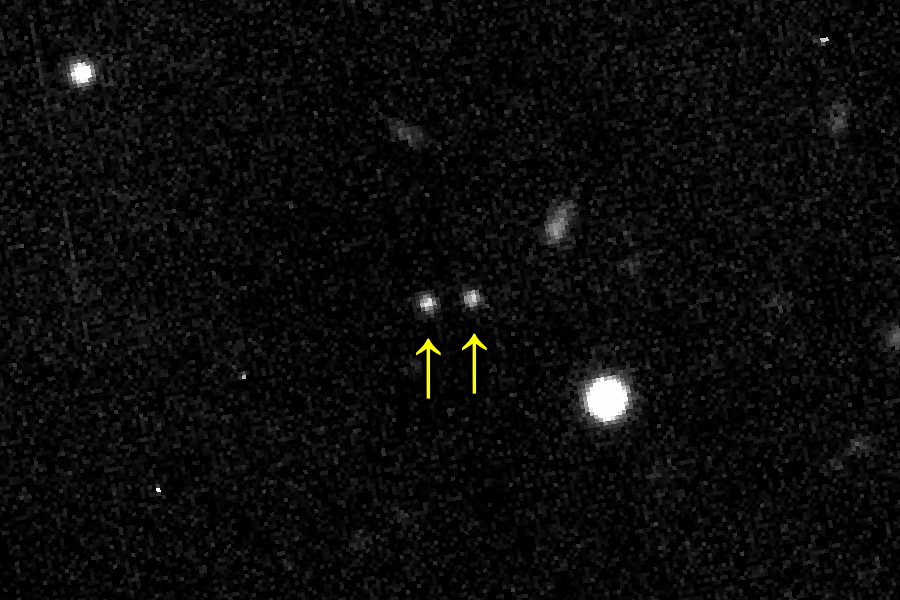
- 2001 QW_{322} imaged by the Gemini North telescope on 9 October 2010

Discovery
- Discovered by: Canada–France Ecliptic Plane Survey: JJ Kavelaars; Jean-Marc Petit; Brett J. Gladman; Matthew J. Holman
- Discovery site: Mauna Kea Obs.
- Discovery date: 24 August 2001

Designations
- Minor planet category: TNO; classical (cold); distant

Orbital characteristics (barycentric)
- Epoch 21 November 2025 (JD 2461000.5)
- Uncertainty parameter 4
- Observation arc: 22.11 yr (8,076 days)
- Earliest precovery date: 27 July 2001
- Aphelion: 45.052 AU
- Perihelion: 42.922 AU
- Semi-major axis: 43.987 AU
- Eccentricity: 0.0242
- Orbital period (sidereal): 291.54 yr (106,486 d)
- Mean anomaly: 134.122°
- Mean motion: 0° 0^{m} 12.171^{s} / day
- Inclination: 4.8095°
- Longitude of ascending node: 124.690°
- Argument of perihelion: 74.789°
- Known satellites: 1

Physical characteristics
- Mean diameter: 128+2 −4 km (primary)
- Mass: 2.150+0.144 −0.223×10^{18} kg (system) (Note: The system mass of 2.150+0.144 −0.223×10^{18} kg is the total mass of the 2001 QW_{322} binary system, including both primary and secondary components.)
- Mean density: 1±0.2 g/cm^{3}
- Geometric albedo: 0.093+0.010 −0.006
- Spectral type: less red ("blue")
- Apparent magnitude: ~24.3 (V band, individual component)
- Absolute magnitude (H): 7.51 (primary); 7.7 (JPL)

2001 QW_{322} is a wide binary system of Kuiper belt objects discovered by astronomers at Mauna Kea Observatory on 24 August 2001. Located beyond Neptune, the binary system comprises two identical components, each about 128 km (80 mi) in diameter, orbiting their mutual barycenter with an orbital period of 17 years.

The components of the binary system have an average separation of 101,500 km (63,100 mi), making 2001 QW_{322} the widest known binary minor planet as of 2025. Due to their separation, the binary system is weakly bound by its components' gravity, making it prone to disruption via collisions or gravitational perturbations by close-passing Kuiper belt objects. Studies have suggested that the 2001 QW_{322} system was formed with an initially small separation but widened over billions of years due to such perturbations by Kuiper belt objects.

The 2001 QW_{322} system is a member of the "cold" classical Kuiper belt, as it follows a distant, low-inclination, and low-eccentricity orbit around the Sun. The cold classical Kuiper belt objects are believed to have formed at their current distances from the Sun, far enough from Neptune to remain undisturbed by the planet's gravitational influence throughout the Solar System's lifetime. Both components of the 2001 QW_{322} system exhibit less red ("blue") colors compared to most cold classical Kuiper belt objects, which has led astronomers to hypothesize that 2001 QW_{322} formed in a high-temperature environment where reddening substances like methanol were unavailable.

== Discovery ==
2001 QW_{322} was discovered by astronomers of the Canada–France Ecliptic Plane Survey, which included JJ Kavelaars, Jean-Marc Petit, Brett Gladman, and Matthew Holman. The discovery took place on 24 August 2001, during a search for moons of Uranus using the Canada–France–Hawaii Telescope at Mauna Kea Observatory in Hawaii. The discovery images, which were taken by Kavelaars and analyzed by Petit, revealed that 2001 QW_{322} is a binary system consisting of two identical components moving together. The components had an angular separation of 4 arcseconds from each other, which translated to an apparent physical separation of 125,000 km (78,000 mi)—far larger than any other binary Solar System object known at the time.

The discoverers immediately recognized the exceptionally wide binary nature of 2001 QW_{322} and thus began a multi-year observing campaign using various large telescopes to determine the binary system's mutual and heliocentric orbits. (Note: "Mutual" refers to the two components of the 2001 QW_{322}, while "heliocentric" refers to around the Sun.) The discovery of the 2001 QW_{322} binary system was announced in circulars issued by the Minor Planet Center and Central Bureau for Astronomical Telegrams on 9 November 2001. The heliocentric orbit of 2001 QW_{322} was determined by 2003, while the mutual orbit was determined by late 2007 and published in October 2008.

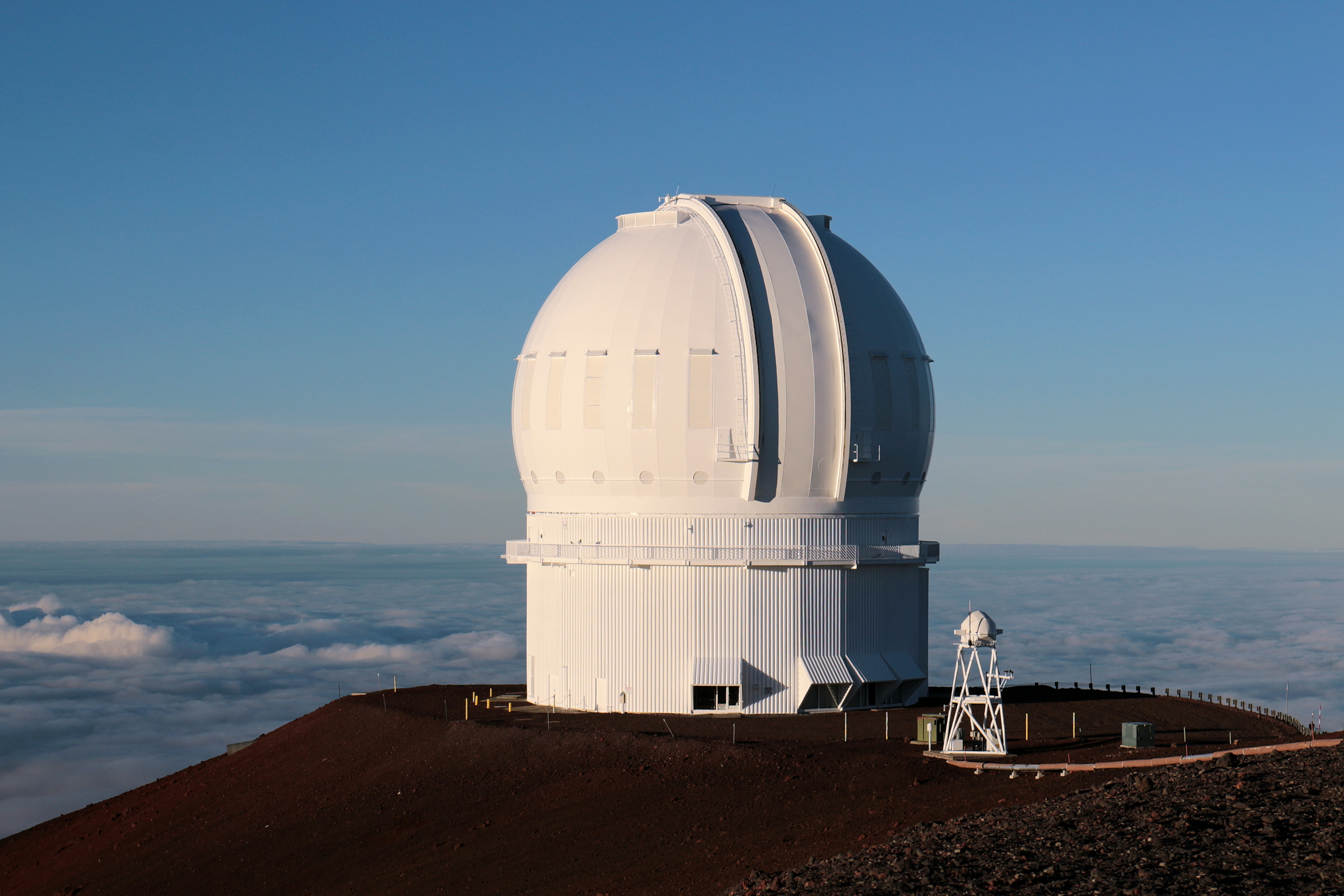
The Canada–France–Hawaii Telescope (CFHT) was used for the discovery of 2001 QW_{322} in 2001.

The CFHT's discovery images of 2001 QW_{322} show two distinctly separated components moving together with respect to background stars.

== Heliocentric orbit ==
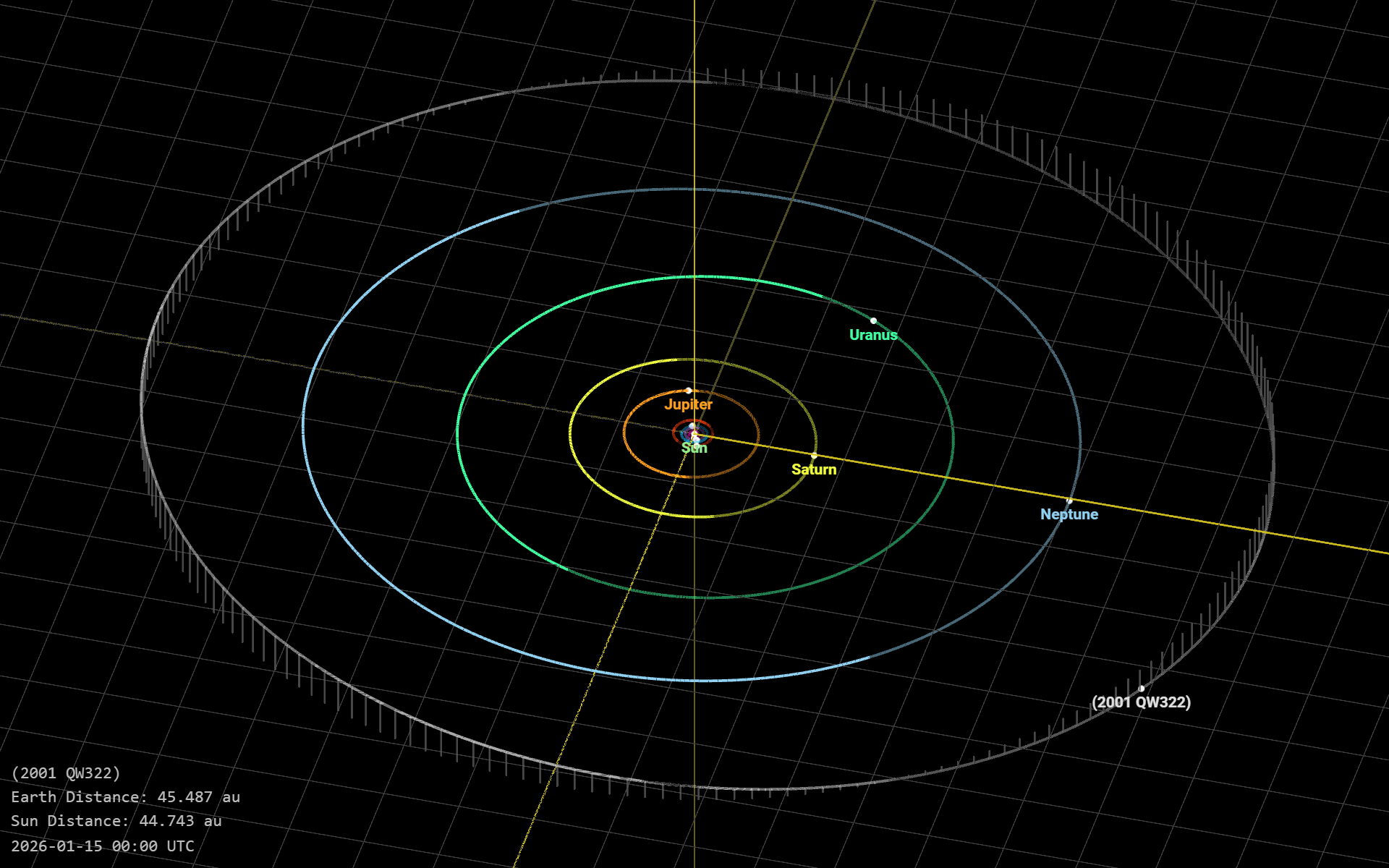
Orbit of 2001 QW_{322} around the Sun, including the orbits of other planets

The 2001 QW_{322} system orbits the Sun at an average distance (semi-major axis) of 44.0 AU (6.58 billion km; 4.09 billion mi), taking 291.5 years to complete one heliocentric orbit. (Note: These orbital elements are expressed in terms of the Solar System Barycenter (SSB) as the frame of reference. Due to planetary perturbations, the Sun revolves around the SSB at non-negligible distances, so heliocentric-frame orbital elements and distances can vary in short timescales as shown in JPL-Horizons.) It is located in the classical region of the Kuiper belt between 42 and 47 AU from the Sun, beyond the orbit of Neptune where many other icy objects like Pluto can be found. 2001 QW_{322} shares its orbit with many other objects in the Kuiper belt, which makes it possible for these objects to pass within a few Hill radii of the binary system. (Note: The Hill radius of the 2001 QW_{322} system, or the extent of its gravitational influence, is approximately 450,000 km (280,000 mi).)

The heliocentric orbit of the 2001 QW_{322} system is nearly circular with a low orbital eccentricity of 0.024. It comes as close as 42.9 AU to the Sun at perihelion to as far as 45.1 AU from the Sun at aphelion, and does not come closer than 12.6 AU from Neptune. (Note: The Minor Planet Center calculates a minimum orbit intersection distance of 12.67 AU between 2001 QW_{322} and Neptune.) Its heliocentric orbit is slightly tilted with a low orbital inclination of 4.8° with respect to the ecliptic. These orbital characteristics make 2001 QW_{322} a member of the "cold" classical Kuiper belt objects (KBOs), which are so named because they have distinctly less excited (dynamically "cold") orbits. (Note: "Cold" does not refer to an object's temperature, but the dynamics of its orbit. Highly perturbed or excited orbits are dynamically "hot" whereas less perturbed orbits are dynamically "cold".) The cold classical KBOs do not come close enough to Neptune to experience significant perturbations by the planet's gravity, so their orbits can remain stable for a long period of time.

== Binary system ==
2001 QW_{322} secondary ("A"/"southern")
- Time lapse showing the 2001 QW_{322} system's orbital motion from 2001 to 2023

Discovery
- Discovered by: Canada–France Ecliptic Plane Survey: JJ Kavelaars; Jean-Marc Petit; Brett J. Gladman; Matthew J. Holman
- Discovery site: Mauna Kea Obs.
- Discovery date: 24 August 2001

Orbital characteristics
- Epoch 27 July 2001 10:04:48 UTC (JD 2452117.92)
- Semi-major axis: 101500+3800 −1400 km (mutual separation; wrt primary); (22.22%+1.33% −0.61% of system Hill radius)
- Eccentricity: 0.46+0.02 −0.01
- Orbital period (sidereal): 17.01+1.55 −0.69 yr
- Average orbital speed: 3 km/h (0.83 m/s)
- Mean anomaly: 158°+19° −10°
- Inclination: 150.7°+0.6° −0.6° (wrt ecliptic); 152.7°+0.6° −0.8° (wrt heliocentric orbit)
- Longitude of ascending node: 243°+3° −4°
- Argument of periapsis: 257°+5° −10° (wrt ecliptic); 248°+6° −10° (wrt heliocentric orbit)
- Satellite of: 2001 QW_{322}

Physical characteristics
- Mean diameter: 126+3 −5 km
- Mean density: 1±0.2 g/cm^{3} (assumed same as primary)
- Albedo: 0.093±0.008 (assumed same as primary)
- Spectral type: less red ("blue")
- Apparent magnitude: ~24.3 (V band)
- Absolute magnitude (H): 7.54±0.05 (Note: Parker et al. (2011) find an absolute magnitude (H) of 7.51 for the primary component and a magnitude difference of 0.03±0.05 between the primary and secondary (with the secondary being fainter). The secondary component's absolute magnitude can be obtained by adding the magnitude difference to the primary component's absolute magnitude.)

=== Nomenclature ===
2001 QW_{322} is the minor planet provisional designation of the whole binary system, given by the Minor Planet Center (MPC) as a shorthand for its discovery date. The components of the 2001 QW_{322} system could not be reliably distinguished by their brightness or size, so astronomers have instead distinguished them based on their relative positions in the sky at the time of discovery. The MPC and a 2008 study led by Jean-Marc Petit have labeled the southern component "A" and the northern component "B", whereas a 2011 study led by Alex H. Parker has arbitrarily labeled the northern component as "primary" and the southern component as "secondary".

The MPC may give a permanent minor planet number to 2001 QW_{322} once its heliocentric orbit is determined with sufficient accuracy. (Note: As of 2026, the MPC and the Jet Propulsion Laboratory's Small-Body Database estimate the uncertainty of 2001 QW_{322}'s heliocentric orbit with an uncertainty parameter of 4.) Once numbered, the discoverers can propose a formal name for 2001 QW_{322}. According to naming guidelines of the International Astronomical Union's Working Group for Small Bodies Nomenclature, trans-Neptunian objects must be given a mythological name, though in the case of classical KBOs like 2001 QW_{322}, names related to creation myths are preferred. Kavelaars, one of the discoverers, has nicknamed 2001 QW_{322} "Antipholus and Antipholus" (after the twin brothers from William Shakespeare's play The Comedy of Errors) in a 2011 news article on the Canada–France Ecliptic Plane Survey's website.

=== Physical characteristics ===
The components of the 2001 QW_{322} system are virtually identical in brightness, with the "primary" (or component B) being 0.03 magnitudes brighter than the "secondary" (or component A) on average. (Note: Petit's 2008 study found an average magnitude difference of (m_{B} – m_{A}) = −0.03±0.02 between the northern "primary" (B) and southern "secondary" (A) components (suggesting the northern "primary" component B is brighter; lower magnitude value means brighter), whereas Parker's 2011 study found an average magnitude difference of (m_{A} – m_{B}) = +0.03±0.05 between the southern "secondary" and northern "primary" components (suggesting the northern "primary" component B is brighter).) If both components share the same albedo, then their identical brightnesses imply identical sizes. The albedo of 2001 QW_{322} is inferred to be 0.093+0.010
−0.006, which suggests a diameter of 128+2
−4 km (79.5+1.2
−2.5 mi) for the primary component. A calculation by Johnston's Archive finds a marginally smaller diameter of 126+3
−5 km (78.3+1.9
−3.1 mi) for the secondary component based on its slightly dimmer brightness, although it is still identical to the primary component's diameter within error bounds. Both components are assumed to be made of water ice and rock, with identical masses and densities within the range of 0.8 to 1.2 g/cm^{3}. The total mass of the 2001 QW_{322} system, which was determined from their mutual orbit, is 2.150+0.144
−0.223×10^{18} kg.

Observations of 2001 QW_{322} in different visible light filters have shown that both components share identical colors, implying they have similar surfaces and albedos. The components have a spectral slope of (−2.2±3.3)%/100 nm, indicating they are less red ("blue") compared to most cold classical KBOs. The "blue" color of 2001 QW_{322}'s components suggests they have exposed ice surfaces. Blue cold classical KBOs like 2001 QW_{322} have been observed to occur more frequently as binary systems than as single objects; astronomers have termed these systems "blue binaries".

The components of the 2001 QW_{322} system have been reported to vary in brightness during observations from 2002 to 2007, with the secondary component varying up to 0.45 magnitudes and the primary component varying up to 0.35 magnitudes. The components' brightness variations may be caused by both phase angle effects and the rotation of a non-spherical shape, although the photometric precision of these observations was insufficient to determine a rotation period for either component.

=== Mutual orbit ===
The components of the 2001 QW_{322} system are separated by an average distance of approximately 101,500 km (63,100 mi), which is equivalent to about one-fourth of the distance between Earth and the Moon, (Note: The Earth–Moon distance is 384,400 km (238,900 mi). One-fourth of the Earth–Moon distance is 96,000 km (60,000 mi), which is 5,500 km (3,400 mi) off from 2001 QW_{322}'s average separation of 101,500 km (63,100 mi). The Gemini Observatory and Canada–France Ecliptic Plane Survey has claimed in 2008 and 2011 that 2001 QW_{322}'s average separation is approximately equivalent to one-third of the Earth–Moon distance (128,333 km or 79,742 mi), but this comparison is outdated as it uses an earlier estimate of 2001 QW_{322}'s average separation (125,000 km or 78,000 mi).) or 22% of the binary system's Hill radius. This separation distance, which is the largest seen in any binary minor planet as of 2025, makes 2001 QW_{322} an "ultra-wide" binary system (having a separation >7% of its Hill radius). Ultra-wide binaries are mainly found in the cold classical Kuiper belt, but they only constitute a small fraction (1–10%) of binary cold classical KBOs. The components in ultra-wide binary systems are weakly bound by each other's gravity, which makes them prone to perturbations by close-passing KBOs and the Kozai effect. Studies have shown that collisions or perturbations by close-passing KBOs could disrupt an ultra-wide system like 2001 QW_{322} within a billion-year timescale, resulting in the permanent separation of the components into their own heliocentric orbits.

Since the components of 2001 QW_{322} have presumably identical masses, the binary system's barycenter lies between them. The components follow extremely slow, elliptical orbits around their system barycenter, taking 17 years to complete one mutual orbit. The components move at an average orbital speed of approximately 3 km/h (0.83 m/s; 1.9 mph), comparable to the walking speed of a human. Their mutual orbit has an average eccentricity of 0.41, though it can vary between 0.342 and 0.477 due to the Kozai effect. At periapsis of their mutual orbit, the components can come as close as 54,700+4,100
−2,600 km (34,000+2,500
−1,600 mi) from each other, although orbital variations from the Kozai effect can make their periapsis separation as small as 53,100+2,300
−1,900 km (33,000+1,400
−1,200 mi). (Note: Parker et al. (2011) give 2001 QW_{322}'s periapsis separation distance in terms of "primary radii", or multiples of the primary component's radius. The "derived" periapsis separation of 2001 QW_{322} is 855+64 −40 primary radii, while the minimum periapsis separation due to the Kozai effect is 830+36 −29 primary radii. The radius of the 2001 QW_{322} primary is 64 km (40 mi), according to Parker et al. (2011).) The mutual orbit of the 2001 QW_{322} system is retrograde with respect to the ecliptic and its heliocentric orbit; its orbital inclination with respect to these reference planes is 150.7° and 152.7°, respectively.

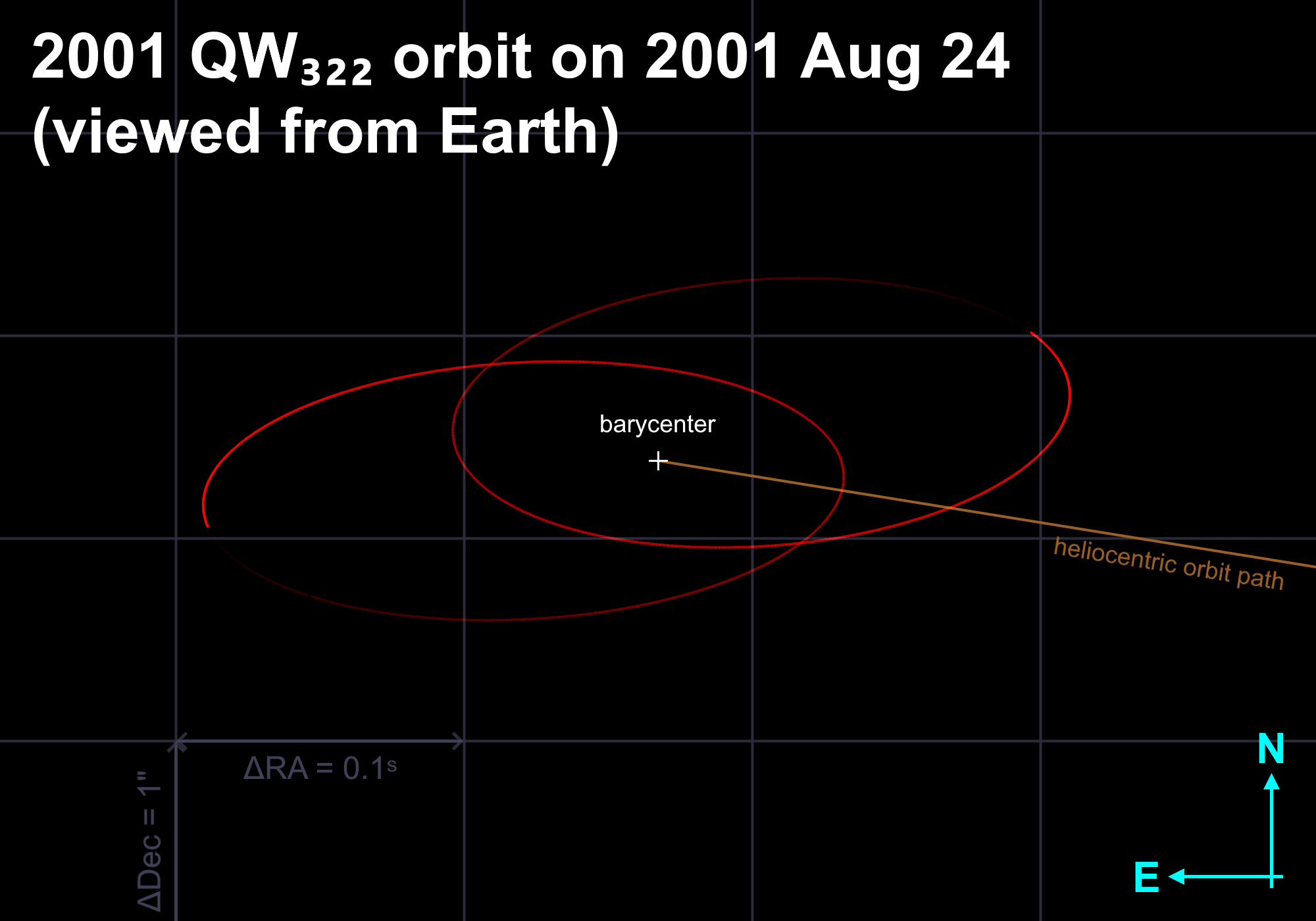
The mutual orbit of 2001 QW_{322} as viewed from Earth on the date 24 August 2001

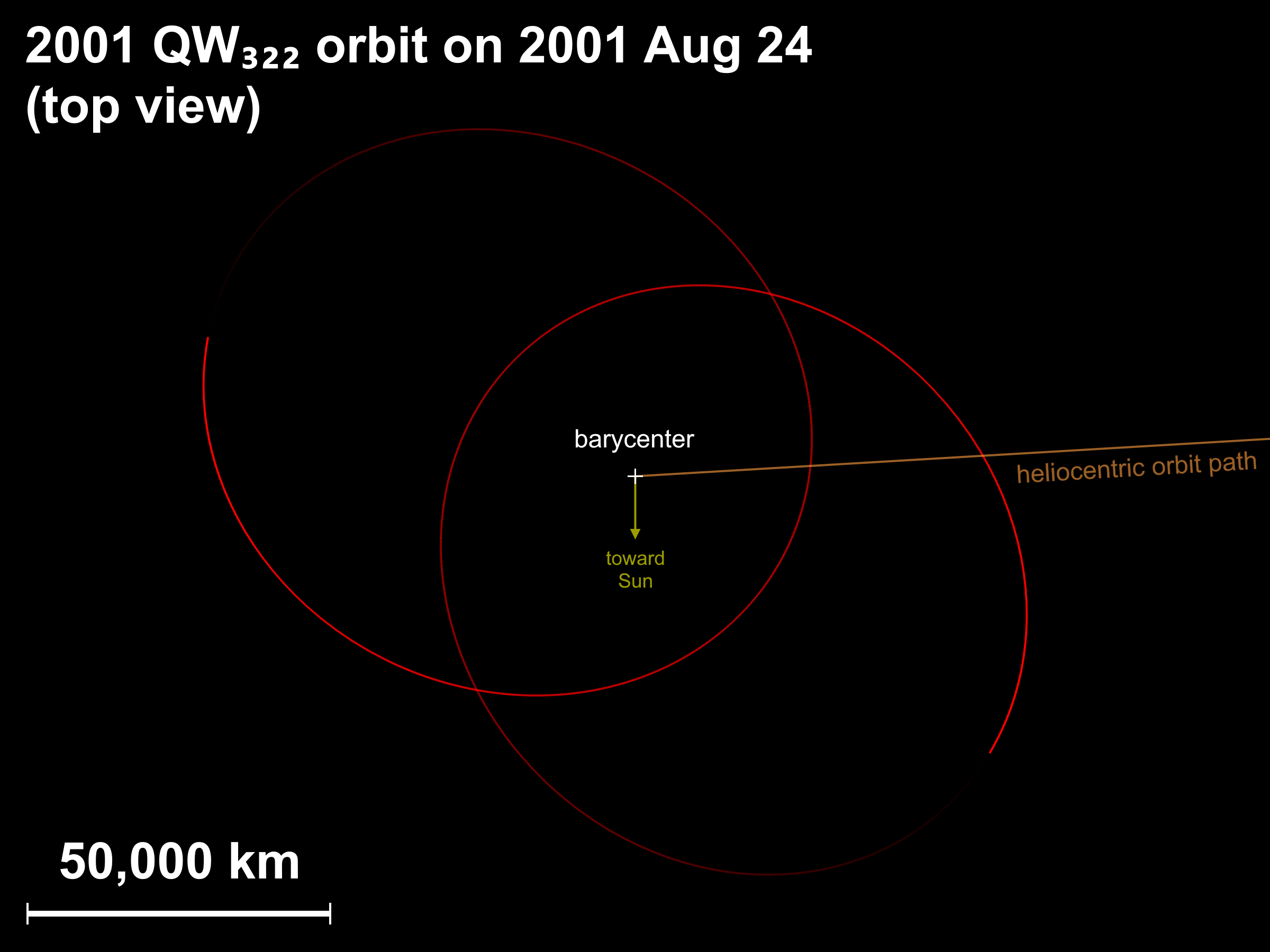
The mutual orbit of 2001 QW_{322} as viewed from above. The positions of components are shown on the date 24 August 2001.

== Origin ==
The wide binary nature and dynamically cold heliocentric orbit of 2001 QW_{322} suggest that it was not greatly disturbed throughout the Solar System's history, which implies that it formed where it orbits now (in situ). Astronomers widely believe that during the early stages of the Solar System, Neptune underwent a period of outward migration (a scenario described by the Nice model) during which it passed through a circumsolar disk of planetesimals around 30 AU from the Sun. In this scenario, planetesimals that passed close to Neptune were gravitationally scattered onto highly inclined and eccentric heliocentric orbits (becoming part of the scattered disk and hot classical Kuiper belt), whereas planetesimals farther out (beyond 42 AU) remained undisturbed from their original orbits and became part of the cold classical Kuiper belt. Any binary systems within the cold classical Kuiper belt would remain intact after Neptune's migration.

Various studies have proposed different mechanisms for the formation of ultra-wide binary KBOs like 2001 QW_{322}. Generally, binary systems within the cold classical Kuiper belt are believed to be a common outcome of streaming instability, a process by which solid particles in a turbulent protoplanetary disk become sufficiently concentrated to begin rapid gravitational collapse into large, 10–100 km (6.2–62.1 mi)-sized planetesimals. Studies led by Hunter M. Campbell during the 2020s have shown that binary KBOs with initially small separations could become ultra-wide over billions of years, due to perturbations by close-passing KBOs. Such close encounters mainly occurred during the early Solar System, when the Kuiper belt was more populated. Alternatively, a 2010 study led by David Nesvorný proposed that ultra-wide binary KBOs with equal-mass components could form directly from the gravitational collapse of a particle cloud with excess angular momentum, and then survive to the present day. Although it is theoretically possible that ultra-wide binary KBOs could form primordially and survive to the present day, their high likelihood of disruption within billion-year timescales makes this possibility unlikely. A 2025 study by Campbell and collaborators showed that only 1.7% of primordial binary KBOs with 2001 QW_{322}-like separations could survive after 4 billion years, suggesting that the initial population of 2001 QW_{322}-like ultra-wide binaries would have to be roughly 40–60 times higher than today.

The less red or "blue" color of 2001 QW_{322} suggests that it had a warmer temperature in the past. While blue KBOs have been hypothesized to have formed closer to the Sun (below 30 AU), the distant location and in situ history of 2001 QW_{322} challenge this hypothesis. A 2022 study by Nesvorný and colleagues proposed that 2001 QW_{322} formed in situ at an earlier time than red KBOs, when the Sun's protoplanetary disk was hotter due to greater irradiance by the young Sun. In this hypothesis, reddening substances like methanol and hydrocarbons did not begin accreting into KBOs until the disk's temperature had decreased sufficiently (20 K or −253.2 °C or −423.7 °F). KBOs that primarily formed from these reddening substances would appear red, whereas pre-existing KBOs like 2001 QW_{322} would only accumulate a thin layer of these substances. Nesvorný and colleagues suggested that the reddened surfaces of pre-existing KBOs would be later excavated via processes such as impacts, which would expose interior materials and potentially result in a bluer color.

== See also ==
- 1998 WW31 – the first wide binary Kuiper belt object discovered
- 341520 Mors–Somnus – a wide binary plutino
