= François Gonnessiat =

French astronomer (1856–1934)

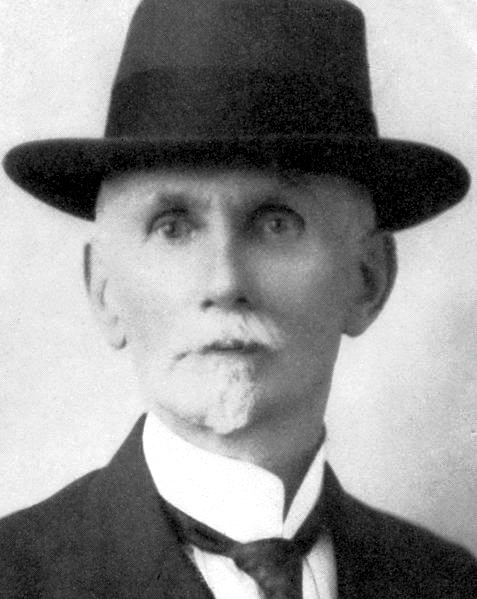
- Born: 22 May 1856; Nurieux-Volognat, France
- Died: 18 October 1934 (aged 78)
- Citizenship: France
- Scientific career
- Fields: Astronomy
- Thesis: Recherches sur l'équation personnelle dans les observations astronomiques de passages (1892)

François Gonnessiat (May 22, 1856 (Nurieux-Volognat)–October 18, 1934) was a French astronomer, observer of comets and discoverer of two minor planets.

He worked at the Observatory of Lyon. In 1889 he won the Lalande Prize for astronomy from the French Academy of Sciences; 1901 became director of the Quito (Ecuador) Observatory for the purpose of making geodetic measurements. He became a well known and respected member of the academic scene of the city, where a street is named after him. From 1908 to 1931, he was director of the Algiers Observatory where one of his colleagues was Benjamin Jekhovsky. He was also director of the Quito Astronomical Observatory.

The asteroid 1177 Gonnessia was named in his memory (H 109).

Asteroids discovered: 2
915 Cosette	December 14, 1918
931 Whittemora	March 19, 1920

== Obituary ==
- The obituary notice incorrectly states that he was director of the Algiers Observatory only until 1916, rather than 1931.
