= Regular moon =

Satellites that formed around their parent planet

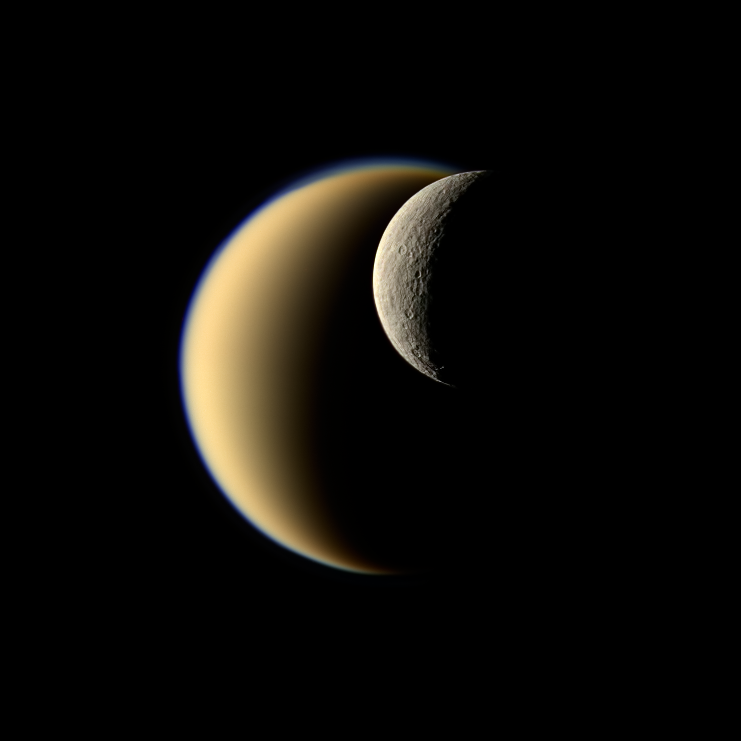
Titan (larger crescent) and Rhea (smaller crescent), two regular moons of Saturn

In astronomy, a regular moon or a regular satellite is a natural satellite following a relatively close, stable, and circular orbit which is generally aligned to its primary's equator. They form within discs of debris and gas that once surrounded their primary, usually the aftermath of a large collision or leftover material accumulated from the protoplanetary disc. Young regular moons then begin to accumulate material within the circumplanetary disc in a process similar to planetary accretion, as opposed to irregular moons, which formed independently before being captured into orbit around the primary.

Regular moons are extremely diverse in their physical characteristics. The largest regular moons are massive enough to be gravitationally rounded, with two regular moons—Ganymede and Titan—being larger than the planet Mercury. Large regular moons also support varied and complex geology. Several are known to have atmospheres, although only one regular moon—Titan—hosts a significant atmosphere capable of supporting weather and climate. As a result of their complexity, the rounded regular moons are often considered planetary objects in their own right by planetary scientists. In contrast, the smallest regular moons lack active geology. Most are heavily cratered and irregular in shape, often resembling small asteroids and other small Solar System bodies in appearance.

Six of the eight planets of the Solar System host 60 regular satellites (Note: Count derived by adding all inner moons and all rounded moons excluding Triton. For simplicity, Mars's two moons are included, while Saturn's spurious F ring moonlets are excluded.) combined, with the four giant planets—Jupiter, Saturn, Uranus, and Neptune—hosting the most extensive and complex regular satellite systems. At least four of the nine likeliest dwarf planets also host regular moon systems: Pluto, Eris, Haumea, and Orcus.

== Origin and orbital characteristics ==
=== Formation ===
Regular moons have several different formation mechanisms. The regular moons of the giant planets are generally believed to have formed from accreting material within circumplanetary discs, growing progressively from smaller moonlets in a manner similar to the formation of planets. Multiple generations of regular satellite systems may have formed around the giant planets before interactions with the circumplanetary disc and with each other resulted in inward spiralling into the parent planet. As gas inflow into the parent planet begins to end, the effects of gas-induced migration decrease, allowing for a final generation of moons to survive.

In contrast, Earth's Moon and Pluto's five satellites are thought to have originated from giant impacts between two protoplanets early in the Solar System's history. These impacts ejected a dense disc of debris into orbit whence satellites can accrete. The giant-impact model has also been applied to explain the origin of other dwarf planet satellite systems, including Eris's moon Dysnomia, Orcus's moon Vanth, and Haumea's ring and two moons. In contrast to regular moon systems of the giant planets, giant impacts can give rise satellites that are unusually massive in proportion to their parent planets; Charon's mass ratio to Pluto is roughly 0.12, while Earth's Moon is the fifth most massive moon in the solar system.

Regular moons may also originate from secondary disruption events, being fragments of other regular moons following collisions or due to tidal disruption. The regular moons of Neptune are likely examples of this, as the capture of Neptune's largest moon—Triton—will have severely disrupted the existing primordial moon system. Once Triton was tidally dampened into a lower-eccentricity orbit, the debris resulting from the disruption of the primordial moons re-accreted into the current regular moons of Neptune.

==== Martian moons ====
Despite the extensive exploration of Mars, the origin of Mars's two moons remains the subject of ongoing debate. Phobos and Deimos were originally proposed to be captured asteroids originating from the neighboring asteroid belt, and thus would not be classified as regular satellites. Their similarities to C-type asteroids with respect to spectra, density, and albedo further supported this model.

However, the capture model may be inconsistent with the small, low-eccentricity, low-inclination orbits of the two moons, which are more typical of regular satellites. The rubble pile nature of Phobos has further pointed against a captured origin, and infrared observations of Deimos by the Hope orbiter have revealed that the moon's surface is basaltic in composition, more consistent with an origin around Mars. As a result, various models for the in situ formation of Phobos and Deimos have been proposed to better explain their origins and current configuration, including a giant-impact scenario similar to the one which formed the Moon and a 'recycling' model for Phobos.

=== Orbital characteristics ===
Orbits of Jupiter's Galilean moons, demonstrating the organized, low-eccentricity orbits typical of regular satellites

Regular moons are characterized by prograde orbits, usually with little orbital inclination or eccentricity relative to their parent body. These traits are largely constrained by their origins and subsequent tidal interactions with the parent body. In the case of the giant planet satellite systems, much like protoplanetary discs, infalling material surrounding a forming planet flattens out into a disc aligned with the planet's equator by conservation of angular momentum. As a consequence, any moons formed from the circumplanetary disc will have orbits roughly coplanar with the planet's equator; even if future perturbations increase a moon's inclination, tidal effects work to eventually decrease it back to a coplanar state. Likewise, tidal circularization acts to decrease the eccentricity of the regular moons by dissipating energy towards a circular orbit, which is a minimum-energy state. Since tidal forces vary inversely with the cube of distance, such effects will act strongly on moons, whose orbits, in proportion to their masses, are relatively close to their primaries. Several regular moons do show departures from these orbital traits, such as Hyperion's unusually eccentric orbit and Miranda's unusually inclined orbit, but in these cases, orbital eccentricity and inclination are often increased and subsequently maintained by resonant interactions with neighboring moons.

Orbital resonances are a common feature in regular moon systems and are a crucial aspect in their evolution and structure. Such resonances can excite the eccentricity and inclination of participating moons, leading to appreciable tidal heating, which can sustain geological activity. A particularly apparent example of this is the 1:2:4 mean-motion resonance (MMR) chain that Io, Europa, and Ganymede participate in, contributing to Io's volcanism and Europa's liquid subsurface ocean. Orbital resonances and near-resonances can also act as a stabilizing and shepherding mechanism, allowing for moons to be closely packed whilst still remaining stable, as is thought to be the case with Pluto's small outer moons. A small handful of regular moons, such as the four trojan moons of Tethys and Dione within the Saturnian system, have been discovered to participate in various co-orbital configurations.

==== Shepherd moons ====
Regular moons which orbit near or within a ring system can gravitationally interact with nearby material, either confining material into narrow ringlets or clearing out gaps within a ring in a process known as 'shepherding'. Shepherd moons may also act as a direct source of ring material ejected from impacts. The material may then be corralled by the moon in its orbital path, as is the case with the Janus-Epimetheus ring around Saturn.

== Physical characteristics ==
=== Geology ===
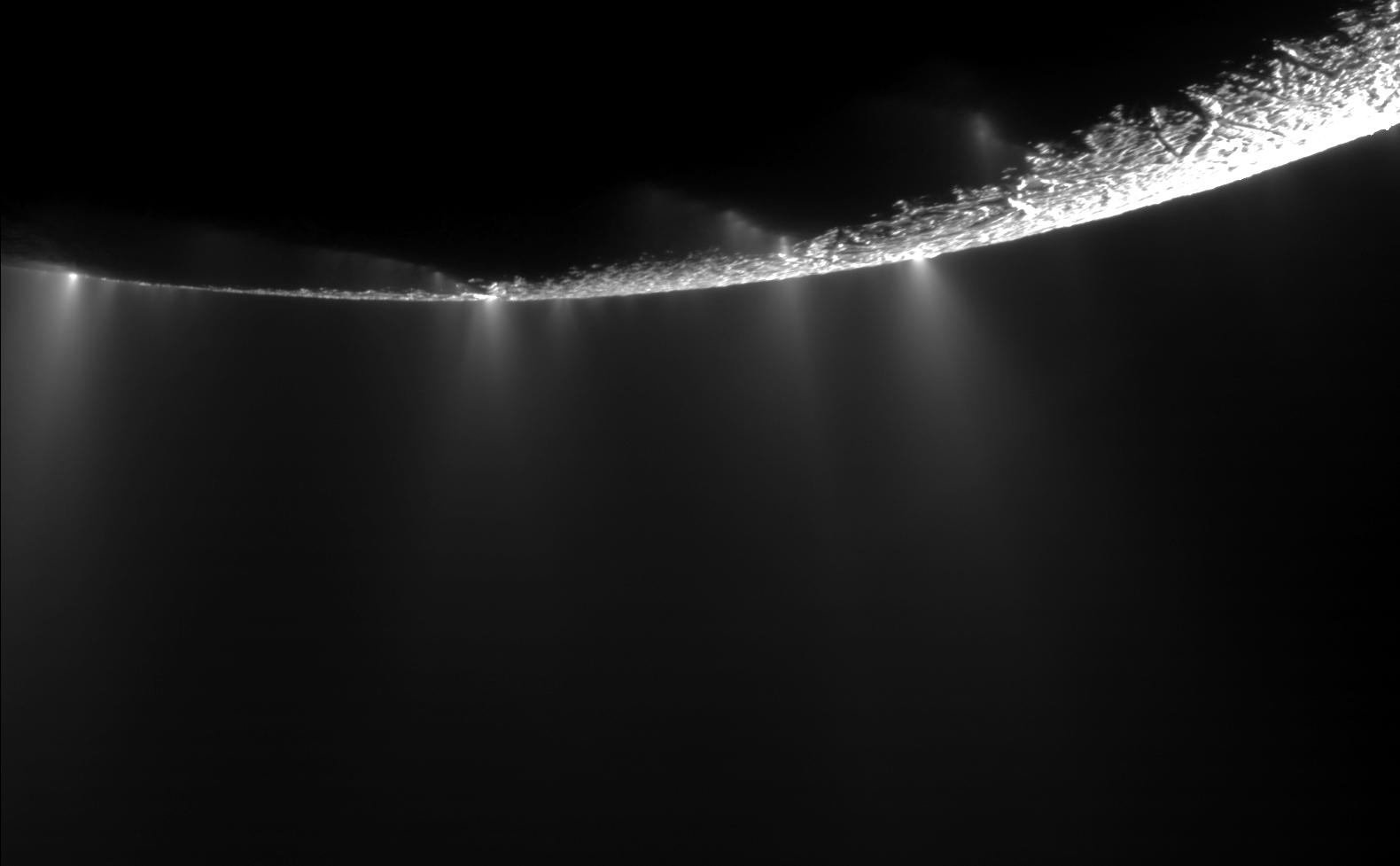
Active plumes on the south pole of Saturn's moon Enceladus, fed by a global subsurface ocean of liquid water

Of the eighteen regular moons large enough to be gravitationally rounded, several of them show geological activity, and many more exhibit signs of past activity. Several regular moons, such as Europa, Titan, and Enceladus are known to host global subsurface oceans of liquid water, maintained by tidal heating from their respective parent planets. These subsurface oceans can drive a variety of geological processes, including widespread cryovolcanism, resurfacing, and tectonics, acting as reservoirs of 'cryomagma' which can be erupted onto a moon's surface.

Io is unusual, as in contrast to most other regular moons of the giant planets, Io is rocky in composition with extremely little water. Io's high levels of volcanism instead erupt large basaltic flows which continuously resurfaces the moon, whilst also ejecting large volumes of sulfur and sulfur dioxide into its tenuous atmosphere. Analogous to the subsurface oceans of liquid water on icy moons such as Europa, Io may have a subsurface ocean of silicate magma beneath its crust, fuelling Io's volcanic activity.

=== Atmospheres ===
Significant atmospheres on regular moons are rare, likely due to the comparatively small sizes of most regular moons leading to high rates of atmospheric escape. Thinner atmospheres have been detected on several regular moons; the Galilean moons all have known atmospheres. The sparse atmospheres of Europa, Ganymede, and Callisto are composed largely of oxygen sputtered off from their icy surfaces due to space weathering. The atmosphere of Io is endogenously produced by volcanic outgassing, creating a thin atmosphere composed primarily of sulfur dioxide (SO_{2}). As Io's surface temperature is below the deposition point of sulfur dioxide, most of the outgassed material quickly freezes onto its surface, though it remains uncertain whether volcanic outgassing or sublimation is the dominant supporter of Io's atmosphere.

One regular moon, Titan, hosts a dense atmosphere dominated by nitrogen as well as stable hydrocarbon lakes on its surface. The complex interactions between Titan's thick, hazy atmosphere, its surface, and its 'hydrocarbon cycle' have led to the creation of many unusual features, including canyons and floodplains eroded by rivers, possible karst-like topography, and extensive equatorial dune fields.

=== Rotation ===
The majority of regular moons are tidally locked to their parent planet, though several exceptions are known. One such exception is Saturn's Hyperion, which exhibits chaotic rotation due to Titan's gravitational influence on its irregular shape; Hyperion's chaotic rotation may be further facilitated by its 3:4 orbital resonance with Titan. The four small circumbinary moons of Pluto, which are similarly elongated, also rotate chaotically under the influence of Charon and generally have very high axial tilts. Hiʻiaka, the larger outer moon of Haumea, was revealed to have a very rapid rotational period of approximately 9.8 hours via lightcurve data, approximately 120 times faster than its orbital period. Results for Namaka were less clear, potentially pointing towards a slower rotational period or a pole-on configuration, with a significant axial tilt relative to its orbital plane.

Charon is large enough to have also tidally locked Pluto, creating a mutual tidally locked state where Charon is only visible from one hemisphere of Pluto and vice versa. Similarly, Eris has been observed to be tidally locked to its satellite Dysnomia, which may indicate an unusually high density for the moon.

=== Parent-satellite interactions ===
Bright auroral spots within Jupiter's northern aurorae, contributed by the Galilean moons

Because of their close nature and long, shared histories, regular moons can have a significant influence on their primary. A familiar example of this are the ocean tides raised by the Moon on the Earth. Just as Earth raises tidal bulges on the Moon which results in tidal locking, the Moon raises tidal bulges on the Earth which manifest most noticeably as the rising and falling of the local sea level roughly diurnally (though local coastal topography can result in semidiurnal or complex patterns).

Io's volcanic activity results in extreme interactions with Jupiter, constructing the Io plasma torus in a roughly toroidal region surrounding Io's orbit as well as a neutral cloud of sulfur, oxygen, sodium, and potassium atoms which immediately surround the moon. Escaping ions from the plasma torus are responsible for Jupiter's unusually extensive magnetosphere, generating an internal pressure which inflates it from within. Jupiter's intense magnetic field also couples an intense flux tube with Io's atmosphere and its associated neutral cloud to Jupiter's polar upper atmosphere, generating an intense region of auroral glow. Similar, albeit much weaker flux tubes were also discovered to be associated with the other Galilean moons.

== Exploration ==
Due to their ability to support large internal volumes of liquid water, regular moons of the outer Solar System are of particular interest to scientists as targets in the search for extraterrestrial life. Subsurface oceans are believed to be capable of hosting complex organic chemistry, an expectation which was supported after the potential indirect detection of various salts in Europa's ocean and the detection of organic compounds and hydrogen cyanide in Enceladus's plumes. As a result, dedicated missions to investigate the nature and potential habitability of several regular moons' internal oceans have been proposed and launched.

=== Active missions ===
- Jupiter Icy Moons Explorer (Juice) is a mission developed and launched by the European Space Agency (ESA) which plans to study Europa, Ganymede, and Callisto and investigate their respective subsurface oceans. Juice is currently en route to Jupiter.
- Europa Clipper is a mission currently under development by NASA, intending to conduct 44 flybys of Europa to better investigate Europa's interior and plume activity. The spacecraft was launched in October 2024, and is currently en route to Jupiter.

=== Missions in development ===
- Martian Moons eXploration (MMX) is a sample-return mission being developed by JAXA. The probe intends to launch in 2026, arriving at Mars by 2027 and collecting data about Phobos before collecting a surface sample from the moon and returning to Earth by 2031. A major goal of MMX is to better constrain the origins and history of Mars's moons.
- Dragonfly is a mission under development by NASA to send a robotic rotorcraft to the surface of Titan with the goal of researching Titan's complex atmospheric and ground chemistry. Dragonfly currently plans to launch in July 2028.

== See also ==
- Inner moon – Natural satellite orbiting inside the orbit of a larger moon
- Orbital resonance – Regular and periodic mutual gravitational influence of orbiting bodies
