= Proper orbital elements =

Mathematical constants describing an orbit

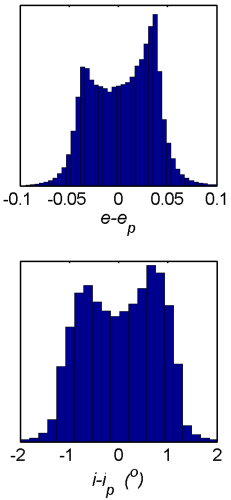
Distribution of the difference between proper and osculating orbital elements for asteroids with semi-major axes lying between 2 and 4 AU.

The proper orbital elements or proper elements of an orbit are constants of motion of an object in space that remain practically unchanged over an astronomically long timescale. The term is usually used to describe the three quantities:

- proper semimajor axis (a_{p}),
- proper eccentricity (e_{p}), and
- proper inclination (i_{p}).

The proper elements can be contrasted with the osculating Keplerian orbital elements observed at a particular time or epoch, such as the semi-major axis, eccentricity, and inclination. Those osculating elements change in a quasi-periodic and (in principle) predictable manner due to such effects as perturbations from planets or other bodies, and precession (e.g. perihelion precession). In the Solar System, such changes usually occur on timescales of thousands of years, while proper elements are meant to be practically constant over at least tens of millions of years.

For most bodies, the osculating elements are relatively close to the proper elements because precession and perturbation effects are relatively small (see diagram). For over 99% of asteroids in the asteroid belt, the differences are less than 0.02 AU (for semi-major axis a), 0.1 (for eccentricity e), and 2° (for inclination i).

Nevertheless, this difference is non-negligible for any purposes where precision is of importance. As an example, the asteroid Ceres has osculating orbital elements (at epoch November 26, 2005)

a	e	i
2.765515 AU	0.080015	10.5868°

while its proper orbital elements (independent of epoch) are

a_{p}	e_{p}	i_{p}
2.767096 AU	0.116198	9.6474°

A notable exception to this small-difference rule are asteroids lying in the Kirkwood gaps, which are in strong orbital resonance with Jupiter.

To calculate proper elements for an object, one usually conducts a detailed simulation of its motion over timespans of several millions of years. Such a simulation must take into account many details of celestial mechanics including perturbations by the planets. Subsequently, one extracts quantities from the simulation which remain unchanged over this long timespan; for example, the mean inclination, mean eccentricity, and mean semi-major axis. These are the proper orbital elements.

Historically, various approximate analytic calculations were made, starting with those of Kiyotsugu Hirayama in the early 20th century. Later analytic methods often included thousands of perturbing corrections for each particular object. Presently, the method of choice is to use a computer to numerically integrate the equations of celestial dynamics, and extract constants of motion directly from a numerical analysis of the predicted positions.

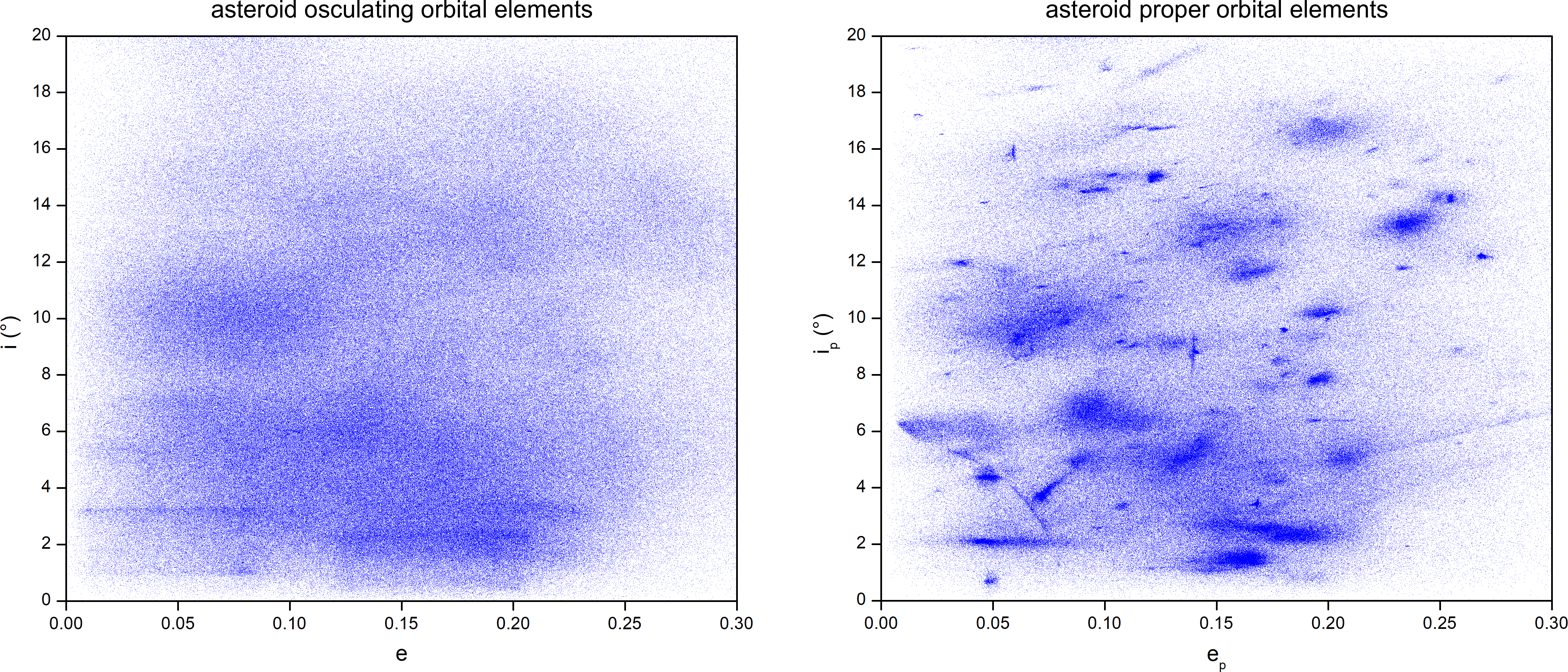
Osculating (left) and proper (right) orbital elements for asteroids in the asteroid belt. Note how asteroid family clumps are not discernible on the left.

At present the most prominent use of proper orbital elements is in the study of asteroid families, following in the footsteps of the pioneering work of Hirayama.

A Mars-crosser asteroid 132 Aethra is the lowest numbered asteroid to not have any proper orbital elements.

== See also ==
- Hirayama family
- Perturbation (astronomy)
