= (60621) 2000 FE8 =

Trans-Neptunian object

(60621) 2000 FE_{8}
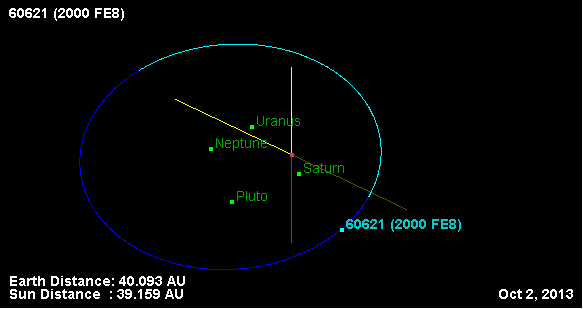
- Orbit of (60621) 2000 FE_{8}

Discovery
- Discovered by: J. Kavelaars; B. Gladman; J.-M. Petit; M. Holman
- Discovery site: Mauna Kea Obs.
- Discovery date: 27 March 2000

Designations
- Minor planet category: TNO · res 2:5

Orbital characteristics
- Epoch 4 September 2017 (JD 2458000.5)
- Uncertainty parameter 4
- Observation arc: 6.80 yr (2,485 days)
- Aphelion: 78.590 AU
- Perihelion: 33.185 AU
- Semi-major axis: 55.888 AU
- Eccentricity: 0.4062
- Orbital period (sidereal): 417.81 yr (152,607 days)
- Mean anomaly: 30.201°
- Mean motion: 0° 0^{m} 8.64^{s} / day
- Inclination: 5.8614°
- Longitude of ascending node: 3.8785°
- Argument of perihelion: 144.17°
- Known satellites: 1

Physical characteristics
- Mean diameter: 146 km (primary); 111 km (secondary)
- Mean density: 1 g/cm^{3}
- Geometric albedo: 0.09
- Spectral type: (yellow-orange) B−V=0.75; V−R=0.48
- Absolute magnitude (H): 6.9

(60621) 2000 FE_{8} is a resonant and binary trans-Neptunian object, approximately 146 kilometers (91 miles) in diameter, located in the outermost region of the Solar System. It was discovered on 27 March 2000, by astronomers JJ Kavelaars, Brett Gladman, Jean-Marc Petit and Matthew Holman at Mauna Kea Observatory on Hawaii. This distant object resides in an eccentric orbit and is locked in a 2:5 orbital resonance with Neptune. It is known to have a 111-kilometer sized companion, which was discovered in January 2007.

== Orbit ==
2000 FE_{8} has an extremely eccentric orbit which crosses the paths of many other trans-Neptunian objects, including almost all of the dwarf planets and dwarf planet candidates. As a result, its position alternates between the Kuiper belt and the scattered disc.

=== Resonance with Neptune ===
2000 FE_{8} is part of a group of trans-Neptunian objects that orbit in a 2:5 resonance with Neptune. That means that for every five orbits that Neptune completes, 2000 FE_{8} makes only two. Several other objects are in the same orbital resonance, the largest of which is (84522) 2002 TC302.

== Satellite ==
Like many objects of the Kuiper belt and scattered disc, 2000 FE_{8} has a satellite. The satellite was discovered by the Hubble Space Telescope seven years after 2000 FE_{8} itself was found. The moon orbits at 1180 kilometres away from 2000 FE_{8}, completing one orbit in approximately 7 days. It is thought to be 115 km in diameter, just 75.7% the diameter of 2000 FE_{8} itself.

== Numbering ==
This minor planet was numbered by the Minor Planet Center on 14 June 2003. As of 2025, it has not been named.
