= (44594) 1999 OX3 =

Trans-Neptunian object

(44594) 1999 OX_{3}
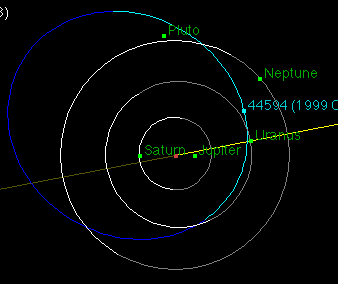
- Orbit diagram (top view, 1999 OX_{3} in blue)

Discovery
- Discovered by: JJ Kavelaars; B. Gladman; M. Holman; J.-M. Petit
- Discovery site: Mauna Kea Obs.
- Discovery date: 21 July 1999

Designations
- Minor planet category: TNO · centaur distant

Orbital characteristics
- Epoch 4 September 2017 (JD 2458000.5)
- Uncertainty parameter 2
- Observation arc: 17.35 yr (6,338 days)
- Aphelion: 46.576 AU
- Perihelion: 17.589 AU
- Semi-major axis: 32.083 AU
- Eccentricity: 0.4518
- Orbital period (sidereal): 181.72 yr (66,375 days)
- Mean anomaly: 347.21°
- Mean motion: 0° 0^{m} 19.44^{s} / day
- Inclination: 2.6248°
- Longitude of ascending node: 259.10°
- Argument of perihelion: 144.53°

Physical characteristics
- Dimensions: 151 km 159.78 km (calculated)
- Synodic rotation period: 9.26 h
- Geometric albedo: 0.10 (assumed)
- Temperature: 65.8 K (perihelion)
- Spectral type: RR; C
- Absolute magnitude (H): 6.07±0.19 (R) · 6.835±0.078 (R) · 7.1 · 7.4 · 7.718±0.092 (Note: Lellouch (2013) Summary figures for (44594) at LCDB referenced as 2013A&A...557...60L, not available at ADS) · 7.85

(44594) 1999 OX_{3} is an eccentric trans-Neptunian object with a centaur-like orbit from the outer Solar System, approximately 150 kilometers in diameter. It was discovered on 21 July 1999, by astronomers JJ Kavelaars, Brett Gladman, Matthew Holman and Jean-Marc Petit at Mauna Kea Observatories, Hawaii, United States.

== Orbit and classification ==
1999 OX_{3} orbits the Sun at a distance of 17.6–46.6 AU once every 181 years and 9 months (66,375 days). Its orbit has an eccentricity of 0.45 and an inclination of 3° with respect to the ecliptic. The body's observation arc begins with its official discovery observation at Mauna Kea in 1999.

Neptune has a semi-major axis of 30 AU and 1999 OX_{3} has a semi-major axis of 32 AU. The Minor Planet Center (MPC) does not classify this object as a centaur because the MPC defines centaurs as having a semi-major axis of less than 30.066 AU. 1999 OX_{3} crosses the orbits of both Neptune and Uranus and has an inclination of only 2.62°. The Deep Ecliptic Survey (DES) defines centaurs using a dynamical classification scheme, based on the behavior of orbital integrations over 10 million years. The DES defines centaurs as nonresonant objects whose osculating perihelia are less than the osculating semimajor axis of Neptune at any time during the integration. Using the dynamical definition of a centaur, 1999 OX_{3} is a centaur.

== Physical characteristics ==
In July 2009, a rotational lightcurve of 1999 OX_{3} was obtained from photometric observations. Lightcurve analysis gave a rotation period of 9.26 hours with a brightness amplitude of 0.11 magnitude (U=2). The period, however, is ambiguous with alternative solutions (13.4 and 15.45 hours).

== Numbering and naming ==
This minor planet was numbered by the Minor Planet Center on 22 August 2002. As of 2025, it has not been named.
