= List of minor planets: 506001–507000 =

The following is a partial list of minor planets, running from minor-planet number 506001 through 507000, inclusive. The primary data for this and other partial lists is based on JPL's "Small-Body Orbital Elements" and data available from the Minor Planet Center. Critical list information is also provided by the MPC, unless otherwise specified from Lowell Observatory. A detailed description of the table's columns and additional sources are given on the main page including a complete list of every page in this series, and a statistical break-up on the dynamical classification of minor planets.

Also see the summary list of all named bodies in numerical and alphabetical order, and the corresponding naming citations for the number range of this particular list. New namings may only be added to this list after official publication, as the preannouncement of names is condemned by the Working Group for Small Bodies Nomenclature of the International Astronomical Union.

Near-Earth obj.	MBA (inner)	MBA (outer)	Centaur
Mars-crosser	MBA (middle)	Jupiter trojan	Trans-Neptunian obj.
Unclassified

== 506001–506100 ==
Designation			Discovery			Properties		Ref
Permanent	Provisional	Named after	Date	Site	Discoverer(s)	Category	Diam.	Ref
506001	2015 GL_{50}	—	September 8, 2011	Haleakala	Pan-STARRS 1	·	3.0 km	MPC · JPL
506002	2015 HN_{2}	—	April 11, 2007	Kitt Peak	Spacewatch	·	1.5 km	MPC · JPL
506003	2015 HT_{3}	—	January 7, 2010	Kitt Peak	Spacewatch	·	2.3 km	MPC · JPL
506004	2015 HU_{4}	—	June 4, 2011	Mount Lemmon	Mount Lemmon Survey	·	1.6 km	MPC · JPL
506005	2015 HQ_{12}	—	May 19, 2006	Mount Lemmon	Mount Lemmon Survey	AST	1.6 km	MPC · JPL
506006	2015 HP_{14}	—	June 16, 2005	Kitt Peak	Spacewatch	·	2.5 km	MPC · JPL
506007	2015 HB_{22}	—	March 12, 2010	WISE	WISE	·	3.2 km	MPC · JPL
506008	2015 HC_{24}	—	October 21, 1995	Kitt Peak	Spacewatch	·	2.7 km	MPC · JPL
506009	2015 HT_{32}	—	October 30, 2007	Mount Lemmon	Mount Lemmon Survey	·	2.3 km	MPC · JPL
506010	2015 HK_{39}	—	September 8, 2011	Haleakala	Pan-STARRS 1	·	3.1 km	MPC · JPL
506011	2015 HM_{51}	—	May 13, 2010	Kitt Peak	Spacewatch	·	1.8 km	MPC · JPL
506012	2015 HG_{59}	—	March 22, 2015	Haleakala	Pan-STARRS 1	·	2.3 km	MPC · JPL
506013	2015 HH_{61}	—	January 28, 2015	Haleakala	Pan-STARRS 1	EUN	1.1 km	MPC · JPL
506014	2015 HB_{63}	—	March 20, 2010	WISE	WISE	ADE	1.9 km	MPC · JPL
506015	2015 HO_{67}	—	September 26, 2011	Haleakala	Pan-STARRS 1	·	2.0 km	MPC · JPL
506016	2015 HV_{73}	—	March 17, 2015	Haleakala	Pan-STARRS 1	·	2.4 km	MPC · JPL
506017	2015 HG_{80}	—	September 26, 2011	Haleakala	Pan-STARRS 1	·	2.9 km	MPC · JPL
506018	2015 HE_{84}	—	March 17, 2015	Haleakala	Pan-STARRS 1	·	1.9 km	MPC · JPL
506019	2015 HN_{84}	—	March 5, 2006	Anderson Mesa	LONEOS	·	1.8 km	MPC · JPL
506020	2015 HV_{89}	—	October 21, 2006	Mount Lemmon	Mount Lemmon Survey	·	2.5 km	MPC · JPL
506021	2015 HO_{98}	—	May 29, 2010	WISE	WISE	CYB	3.2 km	MPC · JPL
506022	2015 HV_{100}	—	October 1, 2005	Kitt Peak	Spacewatch	·	1.5 km	MPC · JPL
506023	2015 HG_{102}	—	December 25, 2013	Mount Lemmon	Mount Lemmon Survey	AGN	1.1 km	MPC · JPL
506024	2015 HL_{103}	—	March 9, 2010	WISE	WISE	·	3.2 km	MPC · JPL
506025	2015 HE_{152}	—	January 28, 2014	Mount Lemmon	Mount Lemmon Survey	EOS	1.7 km	MPC · JPL
506026	2015 HA_{155}	—	December 31, 2013	Haleakala	Pan-STARRS 1	·	3.7 km	MPC · JPL
506027	2015 HB_{156}	—	October 9, 2012	Mount Lemmon	Mount Lemmon Survey	·	2.2 km	MPC · JPL
506028	2015 HO_{171}	—	May 30, 2014	Mount Lemmon	Mount Lemmon Survey	T_{j} (2.7) · centaur	20 km	MPC · JPL
506029	2015 JY_{2}	—	February 10, 2014	Mount Lemmon	Mount Lemmon Survey	EOS	2.3 km	MPC · JPL
506030	2015 JC_{7}	—	April 24, 2015	Haleakala	Pan-STARRS 1	·	2.6 km	MPC · JPL
506031	2015 JL_{8}	—	February 22, 2006	Catalina	CSS	JUN	1.1 km	MPC · JPL
506032	2015 JT_{8}	—	October 21, 2012	Haleakala	Pan-STARRS 1	EOS	1.9 km	MPC · JPL
506033	2015 KO_{12}	—	December 13, 2012	Mount Lemmon	Mount Lemmon Survey	EOS	1.6 km	MPC · JPL
506034	2015 KS_{19}	—	January 12, 2010	Catalina	CSS	·	2.6 km	MPC · JPL
506035	2015 KA_{28}	—	May 9, 2010	Mount Lemmon	Mount Lemmon Survey	·	1.8 km	MPC · JPL
506036	2015 KP_{29}	—	January 31, 2014	Haleakala	Pan-STARRS 1	·	3.0 km	MPC · JPL
506037	2015 KD_{33}	—	October 4, 2006	Mount Lemmon	Mount Lemmon Survey	·	2.5 km	MPC · JPL
506038	2015 KW_{62}	—	November 5, 2007	Mount Lemmon	Mount Lemmon Survey	EOS	2.2 km	MPC · JPL
506039	2015 KV_{65}	—	April 18, 2010	WISE	WISE	ADE	1.9 km	MPC · JPL
506040	2015 KL_{72}	—	April 10, 2015	Kitt Peak	Spacewatch	·	2.0 km	MPC · JPL
506041	2015 KQ_{73}	—	January 3, 2014	Mount Lemmon	Mount Lemmon Survey	·	2.2 km	MPC · JPL
506042	2015 KA_{74}	—	May 21, 2015	Haleakala	Pan-STARRS 1	·	2.8 km	MPC · JPL
506043	2015 KG_{76}	—	September 19, 2006	Kitt Peak	Spacewatch	·	1.5 km	MPC · JPL
506044	2015 KL_{78}	—	February 24, 2014	Haleakala	Pan-STARRS 1	EOS	2.1 km	MPC · JPL
506045	2015 KW_{79}	—	November 23, 2006	Mount Lemmon	Mount Lemmon Survey	URS	3.6 km	MPC · JPL
506046	2015 KW_{80}	—	February 24, 2014	Haleakala	Pan-STARRS 1	·	2.7 km	MPC · JPL
506047	2015 KD_{86}	—	October 8, 2007	Mount Lemmon	Mount Lemmon Survey	·	1.9 km	MPC · JPL
506048	2015 KF_{92}	—	September 24, 2011	Haleakala	Pan-STARRS 1	·	2.9 km	MPC · JPL
506049	2015 KC_{105}	—	March 12, 2010	WISE	WISE	·	1.7 km	MPC · JPL
506050	2015 KF_{105}	—	February 27, 2014	Mount Lemmon	Mount Lemmon Survey	EOS	2.0 km	MPC · JPL
506051	2015 KK_{105}	—	February 9, 2005	Mount Lemmon	Mount Lemmon Survey	·	1.7 km	MPC · JPL
506052	2015 KW_{117}	—	January 16, 2008	Mount Lemmon	Mount Lemmon Survey	·	3.3 km	MPC · JPL
506053	2015 KC_{129}	—	October 20, 2011	Mount Lemmon	Mount Lemmon Survey	·	2.5 km	MPC · JPL
506054	2015 KS_{130}	—	October 2, 2009	Mount Lemmon	Mount Lemmon Survey	3:2 · (6124)	6.1 km	MPC · JPL
506055	2015 KT_{152}	—	September 16, 2012	Kitt Peak	Spacewatch	·	1.3 km	MPC · JPL
506056	2015 LG_{6}	—	January 20, 2009	Mount Lemmon	Mount Lemmon Survey	·	2.7 km	MPC · JPL
506057	2015 LC_{7}	—	September 20, 2011	Kitt Peak	Spacewatch	·	3.2 km	MPC · JPL
506058	2015 LQ_{8}	—	October 1, 2008	Mount Lemmon	Mount Lemmon Survey	EUN	1.2 km	MPC · JPL
506059	2015 LG_{19}	—	October 19, 2011	Haleakala	Pan-STARRS 1	·	3.4 km	MPC · JPL
506060	2015 LF_{39}	—	April 30, 2010	WISE	WISE	·	3.6 km	MPC · JPL
506061	2015 MT_{7}	—	March 26, 2007	Mount Lemmon	Mount Lemmon Survey	MAS	670 m	MPC · JPL
506062	2015 MR_{10}	—	April 23, 2015	Haleakala	Pan-STARRS 1	TEL	1.3 km	MPC · JPL
506063	2015 MW_{10}	—	February 26, 2014	Haleakala	Pan-STARRS 1	·	3.1 km	MPC · JPL
506064	2015 MG_{20}	—	April 19, 2015	Mount Lemmon	Mount Lemmon Survey	ELF	3.4 km	MPC · JPL
506065	2015 MU_{27}	—	November 17, 2006	Mount Lemmon	Mount Lemmon Survey	·	3.1 km	MPC · JPL
506066	2015 MO_{35}	—	July 27, 2011	Haleakala	Pan-STARRS 1	EOS	2.1 km	MPC · JPL
506067	2015 MJ_{99}	—	December 14, 2010	Mount Lemmon	Mount Lemmon Survey	3:2	5.0 km	MPC · JPL
506068	2015 PJ_{102}	—	January 10, 2008	Mount Lemmon	Mount Lemmon Survey	EOS	1.6 km	MPC · JPL
506069	2015 PE_{210}	—	December 18, 2007	Kitt Peak	Spacewatch	·	3.8 km	MPC · JPL
506070	2015 PL_{303}	—	December 8, 2005	Kitt Peak	Spacewatch	·	3.0 km	MPC · JPL
506071	2015 RD_{117}	—	February 28, 2014	Haleakala	Pan-STARRS 1	·	2.5 km	MPC · JPL
506072	2015 TT_{44}	—	September 9, 2007	Mount Lemmon	Mount Lemmon Survey	·	860 m	MPC · JPL
506073	2015 TA_{177}	—	October 3, 2010	Kitt Peak	Spacewatch	·	3.4 km	MPC · JPL
506074 Svarog	2015 UM_{67}	Svarog	October 28, 2015	MASTER-SAAO	V. Lipunov, E. Gorbovskoy	APO · PHA	660 m	MPC · JPL
506075	2015 VU_{5}	—	November 14, 2010	Catalina	CSS	·	2.0 km	MPC · JPL
506076	2015 VS_{32}	—	December 27, 2006	Mount Lemmon	Mount Lemmon Survey	·	2.3 km	MPC · JPL
506077	2015 VX_{41}	—	September 11, 2015	Haleakala	Pan-STARRS 1	·	4.0 km	MPC · JPL
506078	2015 VP_{63}	—	March 13, 2007	Mount Lemmon	Mount Lemmon Survey	·	1.7 km	MPC · JPL
506079	2015 VH_{96}	—	October 25, 2011	Haleakala	Pan-STARRS 1	·	1.5 km	MPC · JPL
506080	2015 VH_{121}	—	April 7, 2013	Mount Lemmon	Mount Lemmon Survey	·	2.0 km	MPC · JPL
506081	2015 VY_{148}	—	December 14, 2010	Mount Lemmon	Mount Lemmon Survey	VER	2.1 km	MPC · JPL
506082	2015 VX_{152}	—	December 18, 2007	Mount Lemmon	Mount Lemmon Survey	H	570 m	MPC · JPL
506083	2015 VZ_{152}	—	December 24, 2012	Mount Lemmon	Mount Lemmon Survey	H	600 m	MPC · JPL
506084	2015 XE_{111}	—	October 13, 2007	Mount Lemmon	Mount Lemmon Survey	·	1.1 km	MPC · JPL
506085	2015 XH_{378}	—	December 30, 2005	Kitt Peak	Spacewatch	H	530 m	MPC · JPL
506086	2015 XD_{385}	—	May 21, 2014	Haleakala	Pan-STARRS 1	H	480 m	MPC · JPL
506087	2015 XG_{385}	—	December 15, 2007	Mount Lemmon	Mount Lemmon Survey	H	570 m	MPC · JPL
506088	2015 XH_{385}	—	January 10, 2006	Mount Lemmon	Mount Lemmon Survey	H	300 m	MPC · JPL
506089	2015 YU_{21}	—	January 5, 2011	Mount Lemmon	Mount Lemmon Survey	H	440 m	MPC · JPL
506090	2016 AB_{4}	—	August 6, 2014	Haleakala	Pan-STARRS 1	EOS	2.0 km	MPC · JPL
506091	2016 AB_{8}	—	February 20, 2007	Siding Spring	SSS	·	2.9 km	MPC · JPL
506092	2016 AX_{10}	—	May 25, 2014	Haleakala	Pan-STARRS 1	H	410 m	MPC · JPL
506093	2016 AL_{42}	—	October 30, 2010	Kitt Peak	Spacewatch	·	1.6 km	MPC · JPL
506094	2016 AF_{94}	—	September 3, 2010	Mount Lemmon	Mount Lemmon Survey	·	1.0 km	MPC · JPL
506095	2016 AY_{99}	—	March 27, 2003	Kitt Peak	Spacewatch	·	1.7 km	MPC · JPL
506096	2016 AP_{104}	—	July 27, 2009	Kitt Peak	Spacewatch	H	510 m	MPC · JPL
506097	2016 AR_{104}	—	August 27, 2014	Haleakala	Pan-STARRS 1	·	1.1 km	MPC · JPL
506098	2016 AS_{109}	—	September 24, 1995	Kitt Peak	Spacewatch	PHO	1.2 km	MPC · JPL
506099	2016 AF_{128}	—	August 15, 2014	Haleakala	Pan-STARRS 1	H	510 m	MPC · JPL
506100	2016 AQ_{143}	—	March 7, 2008	Kitt Peak	Spacewatch	·	1.4 km	MPC · JPL

== 506101–506200 ==
back to top

Designation			Discovery			Properties		Ref
Permanent	Provisional	Named after	Date	Site	Discoverer(s)	Category	Diam.	Ref
506101	2016 AT_{147}	—	March 26, 2011	Mount Lemmon	Mount Lemmon Survey	H	510 m	MPC · JPL
506102	2016 AT_{171}	—	May 8, 2013	Haleakala	Pan-STARRS 1	·	1.3 km	MPC · JPL
506103	2016 AO_{172}	—	February 10, 2000	Kitt Peak	Spacewatch	EOS	2.2 km	MPC · JPL
506104	2016 AF_{181}	—	October 22, 2003	Kitt Peak	Spacewatch	·	3.3 km	MPC · JPL
506105	2016 AM_{194}	—	October 6, 2012	Haleakala	Pan-STARRS 1	H	410 m	MPC · JPL
506106	2016 AN_{194}	—	January 3, 2016	Mount Lemmon	Mount Lemmon Survey	H	560 m	MPC · JPL
506107	2016 AR_{194}	—	March 1, 2011	Catalina	CSS	H	520 m	MPC · JPL
506108	2016 AZ_{194}	—	September 17, 2003	Socorro	LINEAR	H	690 m	MPC · JPL
506109	2016 AD_{195}	—	March 7, 2008	Catalina	CSS	H	480 m	MPC · JPL
506110	2016 AL_{195}	—	January 11, 2008	Catalina	CSS	H	490 m	MPC · JPL
506111	2016 AM_{195}	—	February 13, 2008	Catalina	CSS	H	470 m	MPC · JPL
506112	2016 AQ_{195}	—	February 12, 2011	Catalina	CSS	H	540 m	MPC · JPL
506113	2016 AG_{196}	—	September 30, 2006	Mount Lemmon	Mount Lemmon Survey	H	470 m	MPC · JPL
506114	2016 AH_{196}	—	February 29, 2008	XuYi	PMO NEO Survey Program	H	350 m	MPC · JPL
506115	2016 AB_{200}	—	February 27, 2008	Mount Lemmon	Mount Lemmon Survey	H	450 m	MPC · JPL
506116	2016 BY_{1}	—	November 20, 2003	Socorro	LINEAR	·	3.0 km	MPC · JPL
506117	2016 BW_{13}	—	January 15, 2016	Haleakala	Pan-STARRS 1	H	510 m	MPC · JPL
506118	2016 BV_{31}	—	September 10, 2010	Kitt Peak	Spacewatch	·	1.3 km	MPC · JPL
506119	2016 BQ_{61}	—	January 26, 1993	Kitt Peak	Spacewatch	·	490 m	MPC · JPL
506120	2016 BM_{67}	—	March 31, 2010	WISE	WISE	LUT	4.0 km	MPC · JPL
506121	2016 BP_{81}	—	January 27, 2016	Kepler	KEPLER	cubewano (cold) · moon	209 km	MPC · JPL
506122	2016 BT_{81}	—	August 18, 2006	Kitt Peak	Spacewatch	H	520 m	MPC · JPL
506123	2016 BV_{81}	—	March 2, 2008	Catalina	CSS	H	540 m	MPC · JPL
506124	2016 BX_{81}	—	July 27, 2014	Haleakala	Pan-STARRS 1	H	430 m	MPC · JPL
506125	2016 BF_{82}	—	November 12, 2007	Socorro	LINEAR	H	590 m	MPC · JPL
506126	2016 CV	—	October 1, 2014	Haleakala	Pan-STARRS 1	·	670 m	MPC · JPL
506127	2016 CN_{23}	—	April 21, 2012	Haleakala	Pan-STARRS 1	EOS	1.9 km	MPC · JPL
506128	2016 CK_{28}	—	January 8, 2010	Catalina	CSS	EUP	3.9 km	MPC · JPL
506129	2016 CK_{193}	—	August 21, 2004	Siding Spring	SSS	H	440 m	MPC · JPL
506130	2016 CN_{193}	—	September 14, 2006	Catalina	CSS	H	560 m	MPC · JPL
506131	2016 CL_{247}	—	January 20, 2005	Anderson Mesa	LONEOS	H	560 m	MPC · JPL
506132	2016 CJ_{255}	—	February 2, 2008	Kitt Peak	Spacewatch	H	460 m	MPC · JPL
506133	2016 CJ_{265}	—	September 24, 2009	Catalina	CSS	H	440 m	MPC · JPL
506134	2016 CL_{265}	—	February 12, 2008	Mount Lemmon	Mount Lemmon Survey	H	420 m	MPC · JPL
506135	2016 CQ_{265}	—	March 16, 2005	Mount Lemmon	Mount Lemmon Survey	H	350 m	MPC · JPL
506136	2016 CA_{266}	—	September 17, 2009	Mount Lemmon	Mount Lemmon Survey	H	400 m	MPC · JPL
506137	2016 CK_{266}	—	January 16, 2008	Kitt Peak	Spacewatch	H	300 m	MPC · JPL
506138	2016 DX_{1}	—	October 26, 2012	Haleakala	Pan-STARRS 1	H	450 m	MPC · JPL
506139	2016 DB_{2}	—	October 18, 2012	Haleakala	Pan-STARRS 1	H	420 m	MPC · JPL
506140	2016 DG_{31}	—	October 23, 2012	Mount Lemmon	Mount Lemmon Survey	H	590 m	MPC · JPL
506141	2016 DL_{31}	—	March 14, 2011	Kitt Peak	Spacewatch	H	310 m	MPC · JPL
506142	2016 EM_{1}	—	April 2, 2006	Catalina	CSS	H	560 m	MPC · JPL
506143	2016 EU_{4}	—	March 4, 2005	Catalina	CSS	·	3.4 km	MPC · JPL
506144	2016 EF_{23}	—	February 20, 2016	Haleakala	Pan-STARRS 1	H	490 m	MPC · JPL
506145	2016 EL_{26}	—	January 17, 2015	Haleakala	Pan-STARRS 1	·	2.9 km	MPC · JPL
506146	2016 ET_{27}	—	December 22, 2012	Haleakala	Pan-STARRS 1	H	390 m	MPC · JPL
506147	2016 EK_{52}	—	November 13, 2010	Mount Lemmon	Mount Lemmon Survey	·	1.2 km	MPC · JPL
506148	2016 EX_{54}	—	October 26, 2012	Mount Lemmon	Mount Lemmon Survey	H	430 m	MPC · JPL
506149	2016 EW_{65}	—	September 30, 2003	Kitt Peak	Spacewatch	·	990 m	MPC · JPL
506150	2016 EL_{79}	—	October 11, 2010	Mount Lemmon	Mount Lemmon Survey	PHO	1.0 km	MPC · JPL
506151	2016 EE_{84}	—	January 14, 2008	Kitt Peak	Spacewatch	H	430 m	MPC · JPL
506152	2016 ES_{88}	—	March 15, 2013	Kitt Peak	Spacewatch	·	570 m	MPC · JPL
506153	2016 EV_{110}	—	April 18, 2009	Mount Lemmon	Mount Lemmon Survey	·	740 m	MPC · JPL
506154	2016 ED_{131}	—	October 17, 2014	Mount Lemmon	Mount Lemmon Survey	·	680 m	MPC · JPL
506155	2016 EA_{139}	—	February 20, 2009	Kitt Peak	Spacewatch	·	960 m	MPC · JPL
506156	2016 EA_{144}	—	March 10, 2005	Mount Lemmon	Mount Lemmon Survey	·	1.0 km	MPC · JPL
506157	2016 EH_{147}	—	January 30, 2008	Mount Lemmon	Mount Lemmon Survey	·	1.3 km	MPC · JPL
506158	2016 EN_{190}	—	February 10, 2016	Haleakala	Pan-STARRS 1	·	1.8 km	MPC · JPL
506159	2016 EO_{203}	—	March 2, 2011	Mount Lemmon	Mount Lemmon Survey	H	380 m	MPC · JPL
506160	2016 ES_{203}	—	April 4, 2008	Kitt Peak	Spacewatch	H	430 m	MPC · JPL
506161	2016 ET_{203}	—	August 31, 2014	Haleakala	Pan-STARRS 1	H	530 m	MPC · JPL
506162	2016 EX_{203}	—	April 2, 2006	Kitt Peak	Spacewatch	H	300 m	MPC · JPL
506163	2016 EZ_{204}	—	March 29, 2008	Kitt Peak	Spacewatch	H	410 m	MPC · JPL
506164	2016 EA_{205}	—	October 6, 2012	Mount Lemmon	Mount Lemmon Survey	H	320 m	MPC · JPL
506165	2016 EF_{206}	—	March 1, 2008	Kitt Peak	Spacewatch	H	450 m	MPC · JPL
506166	2016 FL	—	November 24, 2012	Haleakala	Pan-STARRS 1	H	480 m	MPC · JPL
506167	2016 FS_{11}	—	April 30, 2010	WISE	WISE	·	630 m	MPC · JPL
506168	2016 FC_{30}	—	November 11, 2006	Mount Lemmon	Mount Lemmon Survey	NYS	1.3 km	MPC · JPL
506169	2016 FR_{37}	—	February 11, 2016	Haleakala	Pan-STARRS 1	·	1.1 km	MPC · JPL
506170	2016 FF_{42}	—	August 27, 2009	Kitt Peak	Spacewatch	H	430 m	MPC · JPL
506171	2016 FD_{56}	—	March 9, 2005	Kitt Peak	Spacewatch	H	540 m	MPC · JPL
506172	2016 FX_{60}	—	April 30, 2011	Mount Lemmon	Mount Lemmon Survey	H	360 m	MPC · JPL
506173	2016 FE_{61}	—	March 5, 2008	Mount Lemmon	Mount Lemmon Survey	H	390 m	MPC · JPL
506174	2016 FH_{61}	—	October 25, 2009	Kitt Peak	Spacewatch	H	450 m	MPC · JPL
506175	2016 GX_{1}	—	November 7, 2012	Socorro	LINEAR	H	530 m	MPC · JPL
506176	2016 GM_{6}	—	October 30, 2009	Mount Lemmon	Mount Lemmon Survey	(5)	1.2 km	MPC · JPL
506177	2016 GK_{7}	—	October 1, 2005	Mount Lemmon	Mount Lemmon Survey	·	1.7 km	MPC · JPL
506178	2016 GB_{12}	—	July 28, 2009	Kitt Peak	Spacewatch	·	1.2 km	MPC · JPL
506179	2016 GN_{20}	—	October 14, 2004	Kitt Peak	Spacewatch	·	2.7 km	MPC · JPL
506180	2016 GU_{24}	—	February 8, 2007	Kitt Peak	Spacewatch	·	1.9 km	MPC · JPL
506181	2016 GV_{37}	—	November 2, 2007	Kitt Peak	Spacewatch	·	2.4 km	MPC · JPL
506182	2016 GT_{57}	—	August 8, 2013	Haleakala	Pan-STARRS 1	·	890 m	MPC · JPL
506183	2016 GE_{61}	—	August 29, 2006	Kitt Peak	Spacewatch	·	760 m	MPC · JPL
506184	2016 GV_{63}	—	September 18, 2006	Kitt Peak	Spacewatch	·	800 m	MPC · JPL
506185	2016 GR_{82}	—	March 4, 2016	Haleakala	Pan-STARRS 1	·	1.6 km	MPC · JPL
506186	2016 GJ_{95}	—	April 1, 2016	Haleakala	Pan-STARRS 1	·	930 m	MPC · JPL
506187	2016 GC_{99}	—	April 28, 2012	Mount Lemmon	Mount Lemmon Survey	·	1.3 km	MPC · JPL
506188	2016 GZ_{102}	—	October 12, 2009	Mount Lemmon	Mount Lemmon Survey	·	1.8 km	MPC · JPL
506189	2016 GC_{106}	—	October 29, 2003	Kitt Peak	Spacewatch	·	810 m	MPC · JPL
506190	2016 GB_{107}	—	September 19, 2009	Kitt Peak	Spacewatch	H	400 m	MPC · JPL
506191	2016 GN_{108}	—	August 29, 1995	Kitt Peak	Spacewatch	·	1.8 km	MPC · JPL
506192	2016 GX_{120}	—	April 27, 2012	Haleakala	Pan-STARRS 1	·	820 m	MPC · JPL
506193	2016 GF_{126}	—	February 10, 2008	Kitt Peak	Spacewatch	·	1.4 km	MPC · JPL
506194	2016 GG_{127}	—	June 1, 2006	Mount Lemmon	Mount Lemmon Survey	·	2.8 km	MPC · JPL
506195	2016 GK_{156}	—	June 15, 2009	Kitt Peak	Spacewatch	·	1.5 km	MPC · JPL
506196	2016 GE_{165}	—	September 20, 2009	Mount Lemmon	Mount Lemmon Survey	MAR	990 m	MPC · JPL
506197	2016 GG_{190}	—	April 24, 2003	Kitt Peak	Spacewatch	·	1.4 km	MPC · JPL
506198	2016 GP_{190}	—	April 11, 2012	Mount Lemmon	Mount Lemmon Survey	·	1.2 km	MPC · JPL
506199	2016 GD_{193}	—	February 5, 2011	Haleakala	Pan-STARRS 1	·	1.3 km	MPC · JPL
506200	2016 GT_{206}	—	April 12, 2012	Haleakala	Pan-STARRS 1	·	1.5 km	MPC · JPL

== 506201–506300 ==
back to top

Designation			Discovery			Properties		Ref
Permanent	Provisional	Named after	Date	Site	Discoverer(s)	Category	Diam.	Ref
506201	2016 GA_{208}	—	March 25, 2012	Mount Lemmon	Mount Lemmon Survey	·	1.2 km	MPC · JPL
506202	2016 GH_{210}	—	June 17, 2005	Mount Lemmon	Mount Lemmon Survey	·	1.0 km	MPC · JPL
506203	2016 GR_{211}	—	October 3, 2013	Haleakala	Pan-STARRS 1	EUN	940 m	MPC · JPL
506204	2016 GR_{222}	—	April 4, 2008	Kitt Peak	Spacewatch	H	470 m	MPC · JPL
506205	2016 GW_{231}	—	April 4, 2005	Catalina	CSS	EOS	2.6 km	MPC · JPL
506206	2016 GO_{246}	—	October 2, 2003	Kitt Peak	Spacewatch	·	2.2 km	MPC · JPL
506207	2016 GN_{252}	—	March 1, 2008	Kitt Peak	Spacewatch	H	400 m	MPC · JPL
506208	2016 GT_{252}	—	November 22, 2006	Mount Lemmon	Mount Lemmon Survey	H	470 m	MPC · JPL
506209	2016 GM_{253}	—	May 13, 2008	Mount Lemmon	Mount Lemmon Survey	H	510 m	MPC · JPL
506210	2016 HT	—	March 25, 2007	Mount Lemmon	Mount Lemmon Survey	·	2.3 km	MPC · JPL
506211	2016 HJ_{3}	—	May 5, 2011	Mount Lemmon	Mount Lemmon Survey	H	550 m	MPC · JPL
506212	2016 HE_{6}	—	June 12, 2012	Mount Lemmon	Mount Lemmon Survey	·	1.5 km	MPC · JPL
506213	2016 JS_{11}	—	July 7, 2010	Kitt Peak	Spacewatch	T_{j} (2.94)	2.7 km	MPC · JPL
506214	2016 JE_{13}	—	October 18, 2012	Haleakala	Pan-STARRS 1	EUP	2.7 km	MPC · JPL
506215	2016 JC_{15}	—	July 30, 2008	Catalina	CSS	·	1.5 km	MPC · JPL
506216	2016 JY_{16}	—	April 17, 2012	Catalina	CSS	BAR	910 m	MPC · JPL
506217	2016 JY_{24}	—	January 25, 2015	Haleakala	Pan-STARRS 1	·	3.2 km	MPC · JPL
506218	2016 JN_{28}	—	April 1, 2016	Haleakala	Pan-STARRS 1	·	2.0 km	MPC · JPL
506219	2016 JE_{30}	—	May 10, 2008	Mount Lemmon	Mount Lemmon Survey	·	2.2 km	MPC · JPL
506220	2016 JO_{30}	—	April 21, 2012	Haleakala	Pan-STARRS 1	·	1.4 km	MPC · JPL
506221	2016 JK_{31}	—	April 2, 2011	Scranton	G. Hug	·	1.9 km	MPC · JPL
506222	2016 JW_{31}	—	March 15, 2016	Haleakala	Pan-STARRS 1	·	1.6 km	MPC · JPL
506223	2016 JN_{33}	—	February 22, 2007	Kitt Peak	Spacewatch	·	1.2 km	MPC · JPL
506224	2016 JS_{35}	—	July 28, 2008	Mount Lemmon	Mount Lemmon Survey	·	1.8 km	MPC · JPL
506225	2016 JC_{36}	—	September 7, 2004	Kitt Peak	Spacewatch	·	1.1 km	MPC · JPL
506226	2016 JH_{36}	—	February 12, 2011	Mount Lemmon	Mount Lemmon Survey	·	2.0 km	MPC · JPL
506227	2016 LR_{17}	—	April 29, 2003	Kitt Peak	Spacewatch	ADE	1.4 km	MPC · JPL
506228	2016 LZ_{18}	—	January 14, 2001	Kitt Peak	Spacewatch	·	2.3 km	MPC · JPL
506229	2016 LK_{21}	—	September 6, 2008	Mount Lemmon	Mount Lemmon Survey	·	1.5 km	MPC · JPL
506230	2016 LR_{32}	—	May 24, 2006	Mount Lemmon	Mount Lemmon Survey	·	840 m	MPC · JPL
506231	2016 LO_{49}	—	May 24, 2009	Siding Spring	SSS	PHO · slow	1.3 km	MPC · JPL
506232	2016 LO_{52}	—	May 29, 2008	Mount Lemmon	Mount Lemmon Survey	T_{j} (2.97) · 3:2	5.6 km	MPC · JPL
506233	2016 MX_{2}	—	August 9, 2010	WISE	WISE	·	3.0 km	MPC · JPL
506234	2016 NS_{1}	—	May 10, 2005	Kitt Peak	Spacewatch	·	1.0 km	MPC · JPL
506235	2016 NL_{2}	—	October 1, 2009	Mount Lemmon	Mount Lemmon Survey	·	1.5 km	MPC · JPL
506236	2016 NV_{9}	—	April 8, 2010	WISE	WISE	·	3.1 km	MPC · JPL
506237	2016 ND_{17}	—	November 4, 2007	Mount Lemmon	Mount Lemmon Survey	·	4.9 km	MPC · JPL
506238	2016 NE_{18}	—	November 1, 2008	Mount Lemmon	Mount Lemmon Survey	NEM	2.6 km	MPC · JPL
506239	2016 NJ_{24}	—	September 4, 2011	Haleakala	Pan-STARRS 1	·	2.7 km	MPC · JPL
506240	2016 NX_{25}	—	October 10, 2008	Mount Lemmon	Mount Lemmon Survey	·	2.0 km	MPC · JPL
506241	2016 NJ_{28}	—	March 15, 2007	Mount Lemmon	Mount Lemmon Survey	·	1.5 km	MPC · JPL
506242	2016 NU_{31}	—	December 8, 1996	Kitt Peak	Spacewatch	EOS	2.0 km	MPC · JPL
506243	2016 NQ_{40}	—	March 14, 2007	Kitt Peak	Spacewatch	·	1.5 km	MPC · JPL
506244	2016 NE_{45}	—	May 11, 2010	Mount Lemmon	Mount Lemmon Survey	EOS	2.0 km	MPC · JPL
506245	2016 NK_{46}	—	October 13, 2007	Mount Lemmon	Mount Lemmon Survey	AGN	1.1 km	MPC · JPL
506246	2016 NX_{47}	—	February 14, 2005	Kitt Peak	Spacewatch	AGN	1.3 km	MPC · JPL
506247	2016 NK_{48}	—	January 25, 2014	Haleakala	Pan-STARRS 1	·	1.7 km	MPC · JPL
506248	2016 OJ_{2}	—	October 21, 2011	Mount Lemmon	Mount Lemmon Survey	·	2.7 km	MPC · JPL
506249	2016 OE_{5}	—	August 1, 2011	Haleakala	Pan-STARRS 1	·	2.6 km	MPC · JPL
506250	2016 PR_{5}	—	December 12, 2012	Mount Lemmon	Mount Lemmon Survey	·	2.5 km	MPC · JPL
506251	2016 PB_{13}	—	September 24, 2011	Haleakala	Pan-STARRS 1	·	2.7 km	MPC · JPL
506252	2016 PE_{24}	—	April 3, 2010	WISE	WISE	THB	3.2 km	MPC · JPL
506253	2016 PB_{25}	—	February 7, 2008	Kitt Peak	Spacewatch	·	2.6 km	MPC · JPL
506254	2016 PA_{35}	—	November 16, 2006	Kitt Peak	Spacewatch	·	2.9 km	MPC · JPL
506255	2016 PQ_{36}	—	September 23, 2011	Haleakala	Pan-STARRS 1	·	2.7 km	MPC · JPL
506256	2016 PZ_{58}	—	October 27, 2005	Kitt Peak	Spacewatch	·	3.3 km	MPC · JPL
506257	2016 PP_{62}	—	November 25, 2005	Mount Lemmon	Mount Lemmon Survey	·	1.4 km	MPC · JPL
506258	2016 PW_{65}	—	March 8, 2008	Mount Lemmon	Mount Lemmon Survey	·	3.1 km	MPC · JPL
506259	2016 PY_{70}	—	September 25, 2011	Haleakala	Pan-STARRS 1	·	2.6 km	MPC · JPL
506260	2016 QH_{5}	—	September 27, 2011	Mount Lemmon	Mount Lemmon Survey	·	3.0 km	MPC · JPL
506261	2016 QP_{23}	—	January 8, 2002	Socorro	LINEAR	·	3.8 km	MPC · JPL
506262	2016 QR_{24}	—	February 15, 2010	Mount Lemmon	Mount Lemmon Survey	·	1.4 km	MPC · JPL
506263	2016 QU_{47}	—	September 13, 2005	Kitt Peak	Spacewatch	·	4.0 km	MPC · JPL
506264	2016 QB_{54}	—	March 31, 2009	Kitt Peak	Spacewatch	·	3.3 km	MPC · JPL
506265	2016 QQ_{55}	—	November 15, 2006	Kitt Peak	Spacewatch	·	3.3 km	MPC · JPL
506266	2016 QE_{57}	—	December 18, 2001	Socorro	LINEAR	·	2.7 km	MPC · JPL
506267	2016 QR_{59}	—	October 19, 2011	Kitt Peak	Spacewatch	·	2.7 km	MPC · JPL
506268	2016 QH_{65}	—	March 28, 2010	WISE	WISE	·	3.0 km	MPC · JPL
506269	2016 QS_{75}	—	October 10, 2005	Catalina	CSS	·	3.9 km	MPC · JPL
506270	2016 RF_{5}	—	March 31, 2009	Kitt Peak	Spacewatch	·	3.9 km	MPC · JPL
506271	2016 RK_{5}	—	October 2, 2006	Mount Lemmon	Mount Lemmon Survey	·	3.6 km	MPC · JPL
506272	2016 RV_{7}	—	March 12, 2003	Kitt Peak	Spacewatch	·	3.0 km	MPC · JPL
506273	2016 RV_{10}	—	December 17, 2001	Socorro	LINEAR	·	2.2 km	MPC · JPL
506274	2016 RQ_{13}	—	January 9, 2006	Kitt Peak	Spacewatch	·	1.9 km	MPC · JPL
506275	2016 RY_{14}	—	November 2, 2011	Mount Lemmon	Mount Lemmon Survey	·	3.1 km	MPC · JPL
506276	2016 RY_{26}	—	January 20, 1996	Kitt Peak	Spacewatch	·	3.9 km	MPC · JPL
506277	2016 RO_{27}	—	November 1, 2006	Mount Lemmon	Mount Lemmon Survey	·	2.9 km	MPC · JPL
506278	2016 RC_{32}	—	September 6, 2008	Mount Lemmon	Mount Lemmon Survey	3:2	5.0 km	MPC · JPL
506279	2016 SC_{6}	—	December 16, 2000	Kitt Peak	Spacewatch	·	4.4 km	MPC · JPL
506280	2016 TN_{49}	—	October 20, 1993	Kitt Peak	Spacewatch	·	3.9 km	MPC · JPL
506281	2016 TH_{81}	—	September 30, 2006	Catalina	CSS	·	2.6 km	MPC · JPL
506282	2016 TP_{81}	—	October 7, 2005	Catalina	CSS	EOS	1.8 km	MPC · JPL
506283	2016 UR_{91}	—	February 4, 2006	Mount Lemmon	Mount Lemmon Survey	(5)	1.3 km	MPC · JPL
506284	2016 UC_{145}	—	March 9, 2005	Mount Lemmon	Mount Lemmon Survey	·	2.1 km	MPC · JPL
506285	2016 VM_{5}	—	October 5, 2012	Haleakala	Pan-STARRS 1	·	2.2 km	MPC · JPL
506286	2017 AP_{16}	—	April 12, 2004	Kitt Peak	Spacewatch	·	1.5 km	MPC · JPL
506287	2017 BQ_{18}	—	January 23, 2006	Kitt Peak	Spacewatch	·	2.7 km	MPC · JPL
506288	2017 BP_{35}	—	February 2, 2000	Socorro	LINEAR	·	3.6 km	MPC · JPL
506289	2017 BS_{43}	—	January 12, 2010	WISE	WISE	·	2.9 km	MPC · JPL
506290	2017 DG_{3}	—	January 15, 2013	Catalina	CSS	·	1.5 km	MPC · JPL
506291	2017 DQ_{13}	—	January 12, 2010	WISE	WISE	·	3.8 km	MPC · JPL
506292	2017 DU_{79}	—	December 30, 2005	Mount Lemmon	Mount Lemmon Survey	EOS	2.2 km	MPC · JPL
506293	2017 DX_{102}	—	September 27, 2009	Mount Lemmon	Mount Lemmon Survey	·	2.7 km	MPC · JPL
506294	2017 FT_{98}	—	February 12, 2004	Kitt Peak	Spacewatch	·	1.4 km	MPC · JPL
506295	2017 HY_{36}	—	September 15, 2004	Anderson Mesa	LONEOS	DOR	2.7 km	MPC · JPL
506296	2017 KG_{11}	—	January 17, 2007	Kitt Peak	Spacewatch	·	1.9 km	MPC · JPL
506297	2017 MS_{6}	—	October 1, 2000	Socorro	LINEAR	·	1.2 km	MPC · JPL
506298	2017 ME_{8}	—	October 3, 2010	Catalina	CSS	·	870 m	MPC · JPL
506299	2017 NR_{1}	—	March 8, 2008	Mount Lemmon	Mount Lemmon Survey	·	1.2 km	MPC · JPL
506300	2017 NN_{2}	—	October 10, 2004	Socorro	LINEAR	·	3.2 km	MPC · JPL

== 506301–506400 ==
back to top

Designation			Discovery			Properties		Ref
Permanent	Provisional	Named after	Date	Site	Discoverer(s)	Category	Diam.	Ref
506301	2017 NR_{2}	—	August 8, 2004	Socorro	LINEAR	·	1.7 km	MPC · JPL
506302	2017 NG_{4}	—	July 5, 2010	Kitt Peak	Spacewatch	·	600 m	MPC · JPL
506303	2017 NM_{4}	—	November 19, 2003	Kitt Peak	Spacewatch	·	1.5 km	MPC · JPL
506304	2017 OF	—	November 17, 2014	Haleakala	Pan-STARRS 1	·	2.7 km	MPC · JPL
506305	2017 OK	—	November 11, 2013	Mount Lemmon	Mount Lemmon Survey	·	2.7 km	MPC · JPL
506306	2017 OO	—	October 8, 2012	Catalina	CSS	·	2.7 km	MPC · JPL
506307	2017 OR	—	September 24, 2008	Catalina	CSS	(18466)	2.3 km	MPC · JPL
506308	2017 OT	—	September 25, 2007	Mount Lemmon	Mount Lemmon Survey	·	2.4 km	MPC · JPL
506309	2017 OU	—	November 9, 2009	Kitt Peak	Spacewatch	·	1.7 km	MPC · JPL
506310	2017 OV	—	November 8, 2009	Mount Lemmon	Mount Lemmon Survey	·	1.9 km	MPC · JPL
506311	2017 OT_{1}	—	March 13, 2013	Catalina	CSS	PHO	840 m	MPC · JPL
506312	2017 OW_{1}	—	November 17, 1999	Kitt Peak	Spacewatch	·	2.4 km	MPC · JPL
506313	2017 OD_{2}	—	March 2, 2011	Mount Lemmon	Mount Lemmon Survey	·	1.7 km	MPC · JPL
506314	2017 OS_{2}	—	January 10, 2006	Kitt Peak	Spacewatch	·	2.3 km	MPC · JPL
506315	2017 OP_{3}	—	August 11, 2012	Siding Spring	SSS	·	2.0 km	MPC · JPL
506316	2017 OS_{3}	—	November 4, 2004	Catalina	CSS	·	700 m	MPC · JPL
506317	2017 OW_{7}	—	September 23, 2001	Kitt Peak	Spacewatch	THM	2.1 km	MPC · JPL
506318	2017 OE_{8}	—	February 10, 2007	Mount Lemmon	Mount Lemmon Survey	·	1.4 km	MPC · JPL
506319	2017 OL_{8}	—	March 6, 2008	Mount Lemmon	Mount Lemmon Survey	·	1.8 km	MPC · JPL
506320	2017 OX_{8}	—	November 1, 2007	Kitt Peak	Spacewatch	·	710 m	MPC · JPL
506321	2017 OA_{9}	—	July 25, 2008	Siding Spring	SSS	·	1.8 km	MPC · JPL
506322	2017 OH_{9}	—	August 1, 2000	Socorro	LINEAR	·	900 m	MPC · JPL
506323	2017 OO_{9}	—	June 23, 2007	Kitt Peak	Spacewatch	·	2.0 km	MPC · JPL
506324	2017 OU_{9}	—	October 25, 2011	Haleakala	Pan-STARRS 1	·	690 m	MPC · JPL
506325	2017 OZ_{9}	—	June 14, 2010	WISE	WISE	·	3.6 km	MPC · JPL
506326	2017 OX_{10}	—	January 8, 2010	Kitt Peak	Spacewatch	TIR	3.9 km	MPC · JPL
506327	2017 OC_{12}	—	February 2, 2005	Kitt Peak	Spacewatch	V	630 m	MPC · JPL
506328	2017 OP_{12}	—	March 28, 2012	Kitt Peak	Spacewatch	ADE	1.8 km	MPC · JPL
506329	2017 OS_{13}	—	March 24, 2006	Kitt Peak	Spacewatch	·	780 m	MPC · JPL
506330	2017 OR_{15}	—	August 25, 2014	Haleakala	Pan-STARRS 1	·	660 m	MPC · JPL
506331	2017 OG_{20}	—	March 16, 2012	Mount Lemmon	Mount Lemmon Survey	·	1.6 km	MPC · JPL
506332	2017 OM_{20}	—	December 18, 2007	Kitt Peak	Spacewatch	·	750 m	MPC · JPL
506333	2017 OR_{21}	—	September 16, 2009	Catalina	CSS	MAR	1.2 km	MPC · JPL
506334	2017 OV_{25}	—	April 19, 2012	Siding Spring	SSS	·	2.1 km	MPC · JPL
506335	2017 OC_{29}	—	July 3, 2008	Mount Lemmon	Mount Lemmon Survey	EUN	1.5 km	MPC · JPL
506336	2017 OX_{29}	—	July 30, 1995	Kitt Peak	Spacewatch	·	2.7 km	MPC · JPL
506337	2017 OJ_{33}	—	October 4, 2006	Mount Lemmon	Mount Lemmon Survey	·	1.6 km	MPC · JPL
506338	2017 OV_{36}	—	October 9, 2007	Mount Lemmon	Mount Lemmon Survey	·	750 m	MPC · JPL
506339	2017 OX_{38}	—	February 28, 2012	Haleakala	Pan-STARRS 1	(5)	1.2 km	MPC · JPL
506340	2017 OW_{39}	—	November 23, 2014	Mount Lemmon	Mount Lemmon Survey	·	1.4 km	MPC · JPL
506341	2017 OQ_{48}	—	October 12, 1999	Socorro	LINEAR	·	1.5 km	MPC · JPL
506342	2017 OS_{48}	—	June 9, 2008	Kitt Peak	Spacewatch	·	1.7 km	MPC · JPL
506343	2017 OT_{48}	—	September 6, 2008	Mount Lemmon	Mount Lemmon Survey	·	1.7 km	MPC · JPL
506344	2017 OV_{48}	—	June 3, 2006	Mount Lemmon	Mount Lemmon Survey	EOS	2.3 km	MPC · JPL
506345	2017 OW_{48}	—	September 10, 2007	Mount Lemmon	Mount Lemmon Survey	·	2.0 km	MPC · JPL
506346	2017 OY_{48}	—	April 26, 2011	Kitt Peak	Spacewatch	·	2.5 km	MPC · JPL
506347	2017 OD_{49}	—	February 13, 2011	Mount Lemmon	Mount Lemmon Survey	AEO	1.3 km	MPC · JPL
506348	2017 OK_{52}	—	February 19, 2009	Mount Lemmon	Mount Lemmon Survey	·	1.1 km	MPC · JPL
506349	2017 OF_{56}	—	January 26, 2006	Kitt Peak	Spacewatch	NEM	2.3 km	MPC · JPL
506350	2017 OS_{56}	—	September 4, 2008	Kitt Peak	Spacewatch	·	1.8 km	MPC · JPL
506351	2017 OD_{64}	—	September 24, 2008	Mount Lemmon	Mount Lemmon Survey	·	2.1 km	MPC · JPL
506352	2017 OG_{65}	—	September 6, 2013	Catalina	CSS	·	1.4 km	MPC · JPL
506353	2017 OT_{67}	—	January 23, 2006	Socorro	LINEAR	H	490 m	MPC · JPL
506354	2017 PT_{5}	—	June 10, 2013	Mount Lemmon	Mount Lemmon Survey	·	1.3 km	MPC · JPL
506355	2017 PB_{25}	—	January 4, 2010	Kitt Peak	Spacewatch	·	1.3 km	MPC · JPL
506356	2017 QX	—	February 9, 2008	Kitt Peak	Spacewatch	·	1.9 km	MPC · JPL
506357	2017 QF_{4}	—	January 10, 2007	Mount Lemmon	Mount Lemmon Survey	·	890 m	MPC · JPL
506358	2017 QK_{4}	—	March 12, 2016	Haleakala	Pan-STARRS 1	·	1.5 km	MPC · JPL
506359	2017 QF_{6}	—	November 9, 2009	Kitt Peak	Spacewatch	·	1.8 km	MPC · JPL
506360	2017 QB_{10}	—	August 28, 2006	Catalina	CSS	MAS	640 m	MPC · JPL
506361	2017 QJ_{10}	—	July 30, 2009	Catalina	CSS	T_{j} (2.94)	4.7 km	MPC · JPL
506362	2017 QT_{13}	—	December 11, 2004	Kitt Peak	Spacewatch	·	2.9 km	MPC · JPL
506363	2017 QG_{16}	—	July 28, 2009	Catalina	CSS	3:2	5.8 km	MPC · JPL
506364	2017 QC_{19}	—	October 15, 2007	Mount Lemmon	Mount Lemmon Survey	·	670 m	MPC · JPL
506365	2017 QX_{19}	—	September 24, 2012	Kitt Peak	Spacewatch	·	2.0 km	MPC · JPL
506366	2017 QX_{20}	—	October 11, 2010	Mount Lemmon	Mount Lemmon Survey	·	1.0 km	MPC · JPL
506367	2017 QQ_{22}	—	May 13, 2005	Mount Lemmon	Mount Lemmon Survey	·	2.8 km	MPC · JPL
506368	2017 QS_{24}	—	July 28, 2011	Haleakala	Pan-STARRS 1	·	3.2 km	MPC · JPL
506369	2017 QT_{24}	—	September 14, 2013	Mount Lemmon	Mount Lemmon Survey	·	1.7 km	MPC · JPL
506370	2017 QZ_{24}	—	March 7, 2003	Kitt Peak	Spacewatch	EUN	1.3 km	MPC · JPL
506371	2017 QA_{25}	—	February 2, 2006	Mount Lemmon	Mount Lemmon Survey	·	3.0 km	MPC · JPL
506372	2017 QB_{25}	—	November 2, 2007	Kitt Peak	Spacewatch	·	2.4 km	MPC · JPL
506373	2017 QT_{25}	—	May 8, 2013	Haleakala	Pan-STARRS 1	·	650 m	MPC · JPL
506374	2017 QH_{26}	—	October 29, 2008	Kitt Peak	Spacewatch	·	2.2 km	MPC · JPL
506375	2017 QD_{27}	—	October 8, 2012	Haleakala	Pan-STARRS 1	·	2.4 km	MPC · JPL
506376	2017 QY_{30}	—	April 12, 2010	WISE	WISE	·	2.5 km	MPC · JPL
506377	2017 QF_{31}	—	August 21, 2000	Anderson Mesa	LONEOS	·	1.4 km	MPC · JPL
506378	2017 QE_{33}	—	July 30, 2009	Catalina	CSS	·	1.5 km	MPC · JPL
506379	2017 QE_{34}	—	November 4, 2013	Kitt Peak	Spacewatch	·	2.3 km	MPC · JPL
506380	2017 QK_{34}	—	March 13, 2007	Mount Lemmon	Mount Lemmon Survey	·	1.7 km	MPC · JPL
506381	2017 RH	—	June 11, 2005	Kitt Peak	Spacewatch	·	1.2 km	MPC · JPL
506382	2017 RH_{3}	—	August 12, 2013	Haleakala	Pan-STARRS 1	·	1.1 km	MPC · JPL
506383	2017 RV_{3}	—	March 9, 2005	Mount Lemmon	Mount Lemmon Survey	·	1.8 km	MPC · JPL
506384	2017 RA_{7}	—	July 21, 2006	Mount Lemmon	Mount Lemmon Survey	·	2.6 km	MPC · JPL
506385	2017 RB_{7}	—	March 4, 2010	Kitt Peak	Spacewatch	·	2.5 km	MPC · JPL
506386	2017 RW_{7}	—	September 9, 2007	Kitt Peak	Spacewatch	TEL	1.5 km	MPC · JPL
506387	2017 RN_{10}	—	April 14, 2005	Kitt Peak	Spacewatch	V	650 m	MPC · JPL
506388	2017 RL_{12}	—	September 30, 2010	La Sagra	OAM	PHO	640 m	MPC · JPL
506389	2017 RP_{12}	—	October 9, 2007	Mount Lemmon	Mount Lemmon Survey	·	720 m	MPC · JPL
506390	2017 RQ_{12}	—	November 29, 1994	Kitt Peak	Spacewatch	V	820 m	MPC · JPL
506391	2017 RS_{12}	—	January 23, 2006	Kitt Peak	Spacewatch	·	1.8 km	MPC · JPL
506392	2017 RU_{12}	—	February 8, 2011	Mount Lemmon	Mount Lemmon Survey	·	1.4 km	MPC · JPL
506393	2017 RU_{13}	—	August 24, 2011	XuYi	PMO NEO Survey Program	·	3.4 km	MPC · JPL
506394	2017 SK	—	December 1, 2004	Palomar	NEAT	·	800 m	MPC · JPL
506395	2017 SQ	—	January 25, 2014	Haleakala	Pan-STARRS 1	·	2.9 km	MPC · JPL
506396	2017 SV	—	August 17, 2012	Haleakala	Pan-STARRS 1	HOF	2.6 km	MPC · JPL
506397	2017 SH_{1}	—	February 25, 2011	Kitt Peak	Spacewatch	·	1.5 km	MPC · JPL
506398	2017 SV_{1}	—	March 16, 2012	Mount Lemmon	Mount Lemmon Survey	·	960 m	MPC · JPL
506399	2017 SB_{2}	—	August 8, 2007	Siding Spring	SSS	H	550 m	MPC · JPL
506400	2017 SS_{3}	—	March 30, 2004	Kitt Peak	Spacewatch	·	3.6 km	MPC · JPL

== 506401–506500 ==
back to top

Designation			Discovery			Properties		Ref
Permanent	Provisional	Named after	Date	Site	Discoverer(s)	Category	Diam.	Ref
506401	2017 SP_{4}	—	November 10, 2004	Kitt Peak	Spacewatch	·	1.7 km	MPC · JPL
506402	2017 SV_{4}	—	April 6, 2011	Mount Lemmon	Mount Lemmon Survey	·	1.9 km	MPC · JPL
506403	2017 SA_{5}	—	April 4, 2011	Catalina	CSS	·	2.1 km	MPC · JPL
506404	2017 SM_{5}	—	June 19, 2010	Mount Lemmon	Mount Lemmon Survey	·	680 m	MPC · JPL
506405	2017 SK_{6}	—	November 17, 2007	Mount Lemmon	Mount Lemmon Survey	EOS	2.2 km	MPC · JPL
506406	2017 SN_{6}	—	March 26, 2011	Mount Lemmon	Mount Lemmon Survey	·	2.0 km	MPC · JPL
506407	2017 SQ_{8}	—	February 1, 1997	Kitt Peak	Spacewatch	·	4.0 km	MPC · JPL
506408	2017 SX_{9}	—	April 25, 2007	Mount Lemmon	Mount Lemmon Survey	·	2.1 km	MPC · JPL
506409	2017 SF_{13}	—	March 19, 2013	Haleakala	Pan-STARRS 1	·	590 m	MPC · JPL
506410	1131 T-3	—	October 17, 1977	Palomar	C. J. van Houten, I. van Houten-Groeneveld, T. Gehrels	·	1.5 km	MPC · JPL
506411	1995 TP_{5}	—	October 15, 1995	Kitt Peak	Spacewatch	·	1.9 km	MPC · JPL
506412	1995 WY_{39}	—	November 23, 1995	Kitt Peak	Spacewatch	·	1.1 km	MPC · JPL
506413	1996 VZ_{10}	—	November 4, 1996	Kitt Peak	Spacewatch	·	1.8 km	MPC · JPL
506414	1996 VG_{26}	—	November 10, 1996	Kitt Peak	Spacewatch	·	2.2 km	MPC · JPL
506415	1997 EH_{1}	—	March 3, 1997	Kitt Peak	Spacewatch	·	1.4 km	MPC · JPL
506416	1998 QD_{60}	—	August 26, 1998	Kitt Peak	Spacewatch	·	860 m	MPC · JPL
506417	1999 TO_{76}	—	October 10, 1999	Kitt Peak	Spacewatch	ERI	910 m	MPC · JPL
506418	1999 TZ_{226}	—	October 3, 1999	Kitt Peak	Spacewatch	H	470 m	MPC · JPL
506419	1999 TC_{269}	—	October 3, 1999	Socorro	LINEAR	·	2.1 km	MPC · JPL
506420	1999 VW_{29}	—	November 3, 1999	Socorro	LINEAR	·	830 m	MPC · JPL
506421	1999 VY_{106}	—	November 9, 1999	Socorro	LINEAR	·	1.4 km	MPC · JPL
506422	1999 VE_{122}	—	November 4, 1999	Kitt Peak	Spacewatch	MRX	900 m	MPC · JPL
506423	1999 WK_{5}	—	November 16, 1999	Kitt Peak	Spacewatch	·	670 m	MPC · JPL
506424	1999 XV_{141}	—	December 10, 1999	Socorro	LINEAR	PHO	1.1 km	MPC · JPL
506425	2000 DQ_{110}	—	February 29, 2000	Socorro	LINEAR	T_{j} (2.2) · AMO · CYB · +1km	1.7 km	MPC · JPL
506426	2000 QH_{34}	—	August 26, 2000	Socorro	LINEAR	·	1.4 km	MPC · JPL
506427	2000 RE_{34}	—	September 1, 2000	Socorro	LINEAR	·	1.2 km	MPC · JPL
506428	2000 SJ_{100}	—	September 23, 2000	Socorro	LINEAR	·	800 m	MPC · JPL
506429	2000 SS_{284}	—	September 23, 2000	Socorro	LINEAR	·	1.3 km	MPC · JPL
506430	2000 SW_{291}	—	September 27, 2000	Socorro	LINEAR	·	1.2 km	MPC · JPL
506431	2000 TV_{44}	—	October 1, 2000	Socorro	LINEAR	·	1.3 km	MPC · JPL
506432	2000 UN_{3}	—	October 24, 2000	Socorro	LINEAR	·	1.2 km	MPC · JPL
506433	2000 UT_{33}	—	October 31, 2000	Socorro	LINEAR	·	1.4 km	MPC · JPL
506434	2000 UR_{59}	—	October 25, 2000	Socorro	LINEAR	THB	3.1 km	MPC · JPL
506435	2000 UR_{67}	—	September 27, 2000	Socorro	LINEAR	·	3.5 km	MPC · JPL
506436	2000 UE_{73}	—	October 25, 2000	Socorro	LINEAR	·	1.1 km	MPC · JPL
506437	2000 WL_{10}	—	November 20, 2000	Anderson Mesa	LONEOS	T_{j} (2.72) · APO +1km	790 m	MPC · JPL
506438	2000 XJ_{14}	—	December 5, 2000	Socorro	LINEAR	·	1.5 km	MPC · JPL
506439	2000 YB_{2}	—	December 16, 2000	Kitt Peak	M. J. Holman, B. Gladman, T. Grav	cubewano (cold)	128 km	MPC · JPL
506440	2000 YZ_{119}	—	November 27, 2000	Socorro	LINEAR	PHO	1.1 km	MPC · JPL
506441	2001 AV_{19}	—	January 3, 2001	Socorro	LINEAR	·	2.6 km	MPC · JPL
506442	2001 AW_{19}	—	December 22, 2000	Kitt Peak	Spacewatch	·	880 m	MPC · JPL
506443	2001 CM_{35}	—	February 3, 2001	Socorro	LINEAR	·	1.3 km	MPC · JPL
506444	2001 EE_{3}	—	March 3, 2001	Kitt Peak	Spacewatch	NYS	750 m	MPC · JPL
506445	2001 QE_{105}	—	July 27, 2001	Anderson Mesa	LONEOS	·	2.3 km	MPC · JPL
506446	2001 RD_{142}	—	September 11, 2001	Socorro	LINEAR	·	1.9 km	MPC · JPL
506447	2001 SW_{209}	—	September 19, 2001	Socorro	LINEAR	·	1.3 km	MPC · JPL
506448	2001 SN_{355}	—	September 27, 2001	Palomar	NEAT	·	590 m	MPC · JPL
506449	2001 TV_{55}	—	October 15, 2001	Socorro	LINEAR	·	1.7 km	MPC · JPL
506450	2001 TU_{158}	—	September 11, 2001	Kitt Peak	Spacewatch	·	590 m	MPC · JPL
506451	2001 UG_{133}	—	October 21, 2001	Socorro	LINEAR	·	1.7 km	MPC · JPL
506452	2001 UH_{155}	—	October 23, 2001	Socorro	LINEAR	·	2.1 km	MPC · JPL
506453	2001 VW_{77}	—	November 11, 2001	Kitt Peak	Spacewatch	3:2 · SHU	4.0 km	MPC · JPL
506454	2001 WB_{15}	—	November 24, 2001	Socorro	LINEAR	H	600 m	MPC · JPL
506455	2001 XZ_{53}	—	December 11, 2001	Socorro	LINEAR	·	900 m	MPC · JPL
506456	2001 XA_{224}	—	December 15, 2001	Socorro	LINEAR	·	3.2 km	MPC · JPL
506457	2001 YG_{4}	—	December 23, 2001	Kitt Peak	Spacewatch	·	1.1 km	MPC · JPL
506458	2001 YW_{155}	—	December 20, 2001	Palomar	NEAT	(194)	1.7 km	MPC · JPL
506459	2002 AL_{14}	—	January 11, 2002	Socorro	LINEAR	APO +1km	900 m	MPC · JPL
506460	2002 CR_{161}	—	February 8, 2002	Socorro	LINEAR	·	1.8 km	MPC · JPL
506461	2002 FS	—	March 18, 2002	Desert Eagle	W. K. Y. Yeung	·	1.3 km	MPC · JPL
506462	2002 GY_{59}	—	April 8, 2002	Palomar	NEAT	·	1.6 km	MPC · JPL
506463	2002 HZ_{8}	—	April 14, 2002	Anderson Mesa	LONEOS	·	1.7 km	MPC · JPL
506464	2002 JM_{91}	—	April 15, 2002	Kitt Peak	Spacewatch	·	640 m	MPC · JPL
506465	2002 LC_{35}	—	June 10, 2002	Palomar	NEAT	·	980 m	MPC · JPL
506466	2002 LG_{47}	—	June 14, 2002	Kingsnake	J. V. McClusky	·	2.1 km	MPC · JPL
506467	2002 NJ_{68}	—	July 6, 2002	Kitt Peak	Spacewatch	NYS	890 m	MPC · JPL
506468	2002 PA_{147}	—	August 9, 2002	Cerro Tololo	M. W. Buie	MAS	520 m	MPC · JPL
506469	2002 QZ_{117}	—	August 18, 2002	Palomar	NEAT	·	1.5 km	MPC · JPL
506470	2002 QP_{131}	—	August 30, 2002	Palomar	NEAT	MAS	520 m	MPC · JPL
506471	2002 RE_{259}	—	September 14, 2002	Palomar	NEAT	MAS	480 m	MPC · JPL
506472	2002 RJ_{272}	—	September 4, 2002	Palomar	NEAT	KOR	1.2 km	MPC · JPL
506473	2003 AE_{18}	—	January 5, 2003	Anderson Mesa	LONEOS	·	2.1 km	MPC · JPL
506474	2003 BX_{93}	—	January 27, 2003	Kitt Peak	Spacewatch	·	2.6 km	MPC · JPL
506475	2003 ER_{31}	—	March 7, 2003	Needville	J. Dellinger, W. G. Dillon	·	1.9 km	MPC · JPL
506476	2003 FZ_{123}	—	March 12, 2003	Kitt Peak	Spacewatch	·	2.1 km	MPC · JPL
506477	2003 FK_{132}	—	February 6, 2003	Kitt Peak	Spacewatch	·	2.9 km	MPC · JPL
506478	2003 HX_{34}	—	April 9, 2003	Kitt Peak	Spacewatch	MAR	1.2 km	MPC · JPL
506479	2003 HB_{57}	—	April 26, 2003	Mauna Kea	Mauna Kea	SDO	119 km	MPC · JPL
506480	2003 QV_{52}	—	August 23, 2003	Socorro	LINEAR	·	580 m	MPC · JPL
506481	2003 SJ_{69}	—	September 17, 2003	Kitt Peak	Spacewatch	AGN	1.2 km	MPC · JPL
506482	2003 SQ_{130}	—	September 20, 2003	Socorro	LINEAR	·	1.7 km	MPC · JPL
506483	2003 SX_{217}	—	September 28, 2003	Haleakala	NEAT	PHO	960 m	MPC · JPL
506484	2003 SL_{276}	—	September 29, 2003	Kitt Peak	Spacewatch	(13314)	1.1 km	MPC · JPL
506485	2003 SX_{338}	—	September 26, 2003	Apache Point	SDSS	MRX	870 m	MPC · JPL
506486	2003 SV_{359}	—	September 21, 2003	Kitt Peak	Spacewatch	·	430 m	MPC · JPL
506487	2003 SZ_{411}	—	September 18, 2003	Kitt Peak	Spacewatch	EUN	920 m	MPC · JPL
506488	2003 SU_{429}	—	September 28, 2003	Kitt Peak	Spacewatch	PAD	1.4 km	MPC · JPL
506489	2003 SN_{432}	—	September 18, 2003	Kitt Peak	Spacewatch	·	1.4 km	MPC · JPL
506490	2003 UO_{27}	—	October 25, 2003	Anderson Mesa	LONEOS	·	2.0 km	MPC · JPL
506491	2003 UW_{29}	—	October 25, 2003	Socorro	LINEAR	APO · PHA	260 m	MPC · JPL
506492	2003 US_{82}	—	October 19, 2003	Palomar	NEAT	·	2.1 km	MPC · JPL
506493	2003 UZ_{103}	—	October 17, 2003	Anderson Mesa	LONEOS	·	1.6 km	MPC · JPL
506494	2003 UK_{336}	—	October 18, 2003	Apache Point	SDSS	·	1.2 km	MPC · JPL
506495	2003 UJ_{371}	—	October 22, 2003	Apache Point	SDSS	·	1.5 km	MPC · JPL
506496	2003 UZ_{377}	—	September 18, 2003	Kitt Peak	Spacewatch	·	500 m	MPC · JPL
506497	2003 VP_{12}	—	October 19, 2003	Kitt Peak	Spacewatch	·	550 m	MPC · JPL
506498	2003 WA_{36}	—	November 19, 2003	Catalina	CSS	(18466)	2.1 km	MPC · JPL
506499	2003 WS_{181}	—	October 23, 2003	Kitt Peak	Spacewatch	·	1.6 km	MPC · JPL
506500	2003 WZ_{181}	—	September 30, 2003	Kitt Peak	Spacewatch	MRX	850 m	MPC · JPL

== 506501–506600 ==
back to top

Designation			Discovery			Properties		Ref
Permanent	Provisional	Named after	Date	Site	Discoverer(s)	Category	Diam.	Ref
506501	2003 YC_{27}	—	November 21, 2003	Socorro	LINEAR	H	630 m	MPC · JPL
506502	2003 YZ_{41}	—	December 19, 2003	Kitt Peak	Spacewatch	·	900 m	MPC · JPL
506503	2003 YP_{124}	—	December 19, 2003	Socorro	LINEAR	PHO	1.2 km	MPC · JPL
506504	2004 BT_{68}	—	January 27, 2004	Anderson Mesa	LONEOS	·	720 m	MPC · JPL
506505	2004 BE_{120}	—	January 30, 2004	Catalina	CSS	·	830 m	MPC · JPL
506506	2004 BZ_{163}	—	January 28, 2010	WISE	WISE	3:2	6.7 km	MPC · JPL
506507	2004 CB_{105}	—	February 13, 2004	Kitt Peak	Spacewatch	·	1.6 km	MPC · JPL
506508	2004 EZ_{76}	—	March 15, 2004	Catalina	CSS	·	1.1 km	MPC · JPL
506509	2004 EN_{104}	—	March 15, 2004	Kitt Peak	Spacewatch	·	1.5 km	MPC · JPL
506510	2004 FJ_{90}	—	March 20, 2004	Socorro	LINEAR	·	960 m	MPC · JPL
506511	2004 PX_{68}	—	August 7, 2004	Campo Imperatore	CINEOS	·	1.0 km	MPC · JPL
506512	2004 PV_{77}	—	July 17, 2004	Socorro	LINEAR	EUN	1.2 km	MPC · JPL
506513	2004 RV_{133}	—	September 7, 2004	Kitt Peak	Spacewatch	·	1 km	MPC · JPL
506514	2004 RQ_{158}	—	September 10, 2004	Socorro	LINEAR	·	1.7 km	MPC · JPL
506515	2004 RG_{174}	—	September 10, 2004	Socorro	LINEAR	·	440 m	MPC · JPL
506516	2004 RL_{208}	—	August 20, 2004	Catalina	CSS	·	1.6 km	MPC · JPL
506517	2004 RC_{215}	—	September 11, 2004	Socorro	LINEAR	·	1.7 km	MPC · JPL
506518	2004 RB_{336}	—	September 15, 2004	Kitt Peak	Spacewatch	ADE	1.6 km	MPC · JPL
506519	2004 SA_{5}	—	September 19, 2004	Siding Spring	SSS	·	1.9 km	MPC · JPL
506520	2004 TW_{6}	—	September 21, 2004	Socorro	LINEAR	·	1.5 km	MPC · JPL
506521	2004 TW_{8}	—	October 5, 2004	Anderson Mesa	LONEOS	H	560 m	MPC · JPL
506522	2004 TX_{31}	—	October 4, 2004	Kitt Peak	Spacewatch	·	1.2 km	MPC · JPL
506523	2004 TM_{57}	—	October 5, 2004	Kitt Peak	Spacewatch	·	1.1 km	MPC · JPL
506524	2004 TK_{69}	—	August 23, 2004	Siding Spring	SSS	·	1.7 km	MPC · JPL
506525	2004 TR_{69}	—	August 23, 2004	Siding Spring	SSS	·	1.3 km	MPC · JPL
506526	2004 TX_{88}	—	October 5, 2004	Kitt Peak	Spacewatch	·	1.0 km	MPC · JPL
506527	2004 TQ_{96}	—	October 5, 2004	Kitt Peak	Spacewatch	·	1.2 km	MPC · JPL
506528	2004 TR_{97}	—	October 5, 2004	Kitt Peak	Spacewatch	·	1.3 km	MPC · JPL
506529	2004 TG_{147}	—	October 6, 2004	Kitt Peak	Spacewatch	·	450 m	MPC · JPL
506530	2004 TU_{149}	—	September 23, 2004	Kitt Peak	Spacewatch	·	1.1 km	MPC · JPL
506531	2004 TY_{161}	—	October 6, 2004	Kitt Peak	Spacewatch	·	1.3 km	MPC · JPL
506532	2004 TB_{194}	—	October 7, 2004	Kitt Peak	Spacewatch	·	2.3 km	MPC · JPL
506533	2004 TR_{208}	—	October 8, 2004	Kitt Peak	Spacewatch	·	1.1 km	MPC · JPL
506534	2004 TH_{233}	—	October 4, 2004	Kitt Peak	Spacewatch	·	550 m	MPC · JPL
506535	2004 TJ_{241}	—	October 10, 2004	Socorro	LINEAR	·	1.5 km	MPC · JPL
506536	2004 TW_{242}	—	September 21, 2004	Socorro	LINEAR	EUN	1.5 km	MPC · JPL
506537	2004 TX_{274}	—	October 9, 2004	Kitt Peak	Spacewatch	·	1.3 km	MPC · JPL
506538	2004 VS_{82}	—	October 10, 2004	Kitt Peak	Spacewatch	·	510 m	MPC · JPL
506539	2004 XY_{13}	—	December 9, 2004	Catalina	CSS	·	1.6 km	MPC · JPL
506540	2004 XT_{29}	—	December 10, 2004	Socorro	LINEAR	·	1.6 km	MPC · JPL
506541	2004 XB_{181}	—	December 15, 2004	Campo Imperatore	CINEOS	·	1.8 km	MPC · JPL
506542	2005 AH_{2}	—	January 6, 2005	Socorro	LINEAR	BAR	1.4 km	MPC · JPL
506543	2005 AE_{68}	—	January 6, 2005	Socorro	LINEAR	H	510 m	MPC · JPL
506544	2005 EN_{47}	—	March 3, 2005	Kitt Peak	Spacewatch	·	730 m	MPC · JPL
506545	2005 EX_{47}	—	March 3, 2005	Catalina	CSS	JUN	1.0 km	MPC · JPL
506546	2005 GZ_{67}	—	April 2, 2005	Mount Lemmon	Mount Lemmon Survey	·	510 m	MPC · JPL
506547	2005 GT_{110}	—	April 10, 2005	Kitt Peak	Spacewatch	H	500 m	MPC · JPL
506548	2005 NP_{18}	—	July 4, 2005	Mount Lemmon	Mount Lemmon Survey	·	970 m	MPC · JPL
506549	2005 NE_{37}	—	July 6, 2005	Kitt Peak	Spacewatch	TIR	2.4 km	MPC · JPL
506550	2005 NM_{82}	—	July 1, 2005	Kitt Peak	Spacewatch	H	610 m	MPC · JPL
506551	2005 NZ_{122}	—	July 4, 2005	Siding Spring	SSS	·	3.5 km	MPC · JPL
506552	2005 QK_{127}	—	August 28, 2005	Kitt Peak	Spacewatch	·	2.7 km	MPC · JPL
506553	2005 QV_{138}	—	August 28, 2005	Kitt Peak	Spacewatch	EOS	1.9 km	MPC · JPL
506554	2005 QZ_{189}	—	August 30, 2005	Kitt Peak	Spacewatch	·	2.7 km	MPC · JPL
506555	2005 SP_{72}	—	September 23, 2005	Catalina	CSS	·	1.2 km	MPC · JPL
506556	2005 SE_{101}	—	September 25, 2005	Kitt Peak	Spacewatch	·	2.5 km	MPC · JPL
506557	2005 SY_{109}	—	September 26, 2005	Kitt Peak	Spacewatch	·	2.6 km	MPC · JPL
506558	2005 SP_{154}	—	September 26, 2005	Kitt Peak	Spacewatch	·	2.4 km	MPC · JPL
506559	2005 TC_{79}	—	October 7, 2005	Kitt Peak	Spacewatch	·	890 m	MPC · JPL
506560	2005 TW_{93}	—	September 25, 2005	Kitt Peak	Spacewatch	·	2.5 km	MPC · JPL
506561	2005 TS_{115}	—	October 7, 2005	Kitt Peak	Spacewatch	·	2.1 km	MPC · JPL
506562	2005 TA_{136}	—	October 6, 2005	Kitt Peak	Spacewatch	·	1.0 km	MPC · JPL
506563	2005 TY_{146}	—	September 29, 2005	Kitt Peak	Spacewatch	T_{j} (2.95)	3.2 km	MPC · JPL
506564	2005 TV_{191}	—	October 2, 2005	Mount Lemmon	Mount Lemmon Survey	·	3.2 km	MPC · JPL
506565	2005 UU_{34}	—	October 24, 2005	Kitt Peak	Spacewatch	·	890 m	MPC · JPL
506566	2005 UD_{47}	—	October 22, 2005	Kitt Peak	Spacewatch	·	650 m	MPC · JPL
506567	2005 UC_{51}	—	October 23, 2005	Catalina	CSS	·	870 m	MPC · JPL
506568	2005 UQ_{91}	—	October 22, 2005	Kitt Peak	Spacewatch	·	1.1 km	MPC · JPL
506569	2005 UW_{125}	—	October 24, 2005	Kitt Peak	Spacewatch	·	1.1 km	MPC · JPL
506570	2005 UV_{151}	—	October 26, 2005	Kitt Peak	Spacewatch	·	600 m	MPC · JPL
506571	2005 UH_{169}	—	October 24, 2005	Kitt Peak	Spacewatch	·	3.4 km	MPC · JPL
506572	2005 UB_{174}	—	October 24, 2005	Kitt Peak	Spacewatch	·	880 m	MPC · JPL
506573	2005 UC_{181}	—	October 24, 2005	Kitt Peak	Spacewatch	AGN	1.1 km	MPC · JPL
506574	2005 UT_{231}	—	October 25, 2005	Mount Lemmon	Mount Lemmon Survey	·	500 m	MPC · JPL
506575	2005 UV_{259}	—	October 25, 2005	Kitt Peak	Spacewatch	HNS	840 m	MPC · JPL
506576	2005 UK_{264}	—	October 27, 2005	Kitt Peak	Spacewatch	·	2.7 km	MPC · JPL
506577	2005 UH_{345}	—	October 29, 2005	Mount Lemmon	Mount Lemmon Survey	·	720 m	MPC · JPL
506578	2005 UX_{411}	—	October 31, 2005	Mount Lemmon	Mount Lemmon Survey	·	2.9 km	MPC · JPL
506579	2005 UQ_{461}	—	October 29, 2005	Mount Lemmon	Mount Lemmon Survey	·	2.4 km	MPC · JPL
506580	2005 VR_{8}	—	November 1, 2005	Kitt Peak	Spacewatch	·	780 m	MPC · JPL
506581	2005 VQ_{58}	—	October 25, 2005	Kitt Peak	Spacewatch	·	870 m	MPC · JPL
506582	2005 VA_{127}	—	November 1, 2005	Apache Point	A. C. Becker	·	760 m	MPC · JPL
506583	2005 WX_{10}	—	November 22, 2005	Kitt Peak	Spacewatch	·	910 m	MPC · JPL
506584	2005 WO_{17}	—	November 22, 2005	Kitt Peak	Spacewatch	·	920 m	MPC · JPL
506585	2005 WJ_{20}	—	November 21, 2005	Kitt Peak	Spacewatch	·	800 m	MPC · JPL
506586	2005 WT_{76}	—	November 1, 2005	Mount Lemmon	Mount Lemmon Survey	MAR	680 m	MPC · JPL
506587	2005 WE_{88}	—	November 28, 2005	Mount Lemmon	Mount Lemmon Survey	·	1.0 km	MPC · JPL
506588	2005 WU_{89}	—	November 26, 2005	Catalina	CSS	·	1.1 km	MPC · JPL
506589	2005 WP_{158}	—	November 28, 2005	Socorro	LINEAR	·	3.2 km	MPC · JPL
506590	2005 XB_{1}	—	December 4, 2005	Mount Lemmon	Mount Lemmon Survey	APO	100 m	MPC · JPL
506591	2005 XE_{15}	—	December 1, 2005	Kitt Peak	Spacewatch	(5)	890 m	MPC · JPL
506592	2005 XK_{26}	—	December 4, 2005	Mount Lemmon	Mount Lemmon Survey	·	500 m	MPC · JPL
506593	2005 XM_{53}	—	December 4, 2005	Kitt Peak	Spacewatch	·	830 m	MPC · JPL
506594	2005 YV_{32}	—	December 22, 2005	Kitt Peak	Spacewatch	·	1.1 km	MPC · JPL
506595	2005 YF_{83}	—	December 24, 2005	Kitt Peak	Spacewatch	·	570 m	MPC · JPL
506596	2005 YQ_{154}	—	December 29, 2005	Kitt Peak	Spacewatch	·	940 m	MPC · JPL
506597	2005 YY_{159}	—	December 27, 2005	Kitt Peak	Spacewatch	·	1.0 km	MPC · JPL
506598	2005 YQ_{264}	—	December 25, 2005	Kitt Peak	Spacewatch	SYL · CYB	3.4 km	MPC · JPL
506599	2006 AL_{35}	—	January 4, 2006	Kitt Peak	Spacewatch	·	1.4 km	MPC · JPL
506600	2006 AJ_{41}	—	January 2, 2006	Catalina	CSS	·	1.6 km	MPC · JPL

== 506601–506700 ==
back to top

Designation			Discovery			Properties		Ref
Permanent	Provisional	Named after	Date	Site	Discoverer(s)	Category	Diam.	Ref
506601	2006 AD_{104}	—	January 7, 2006	Mount Lemmon	Mount Lemmon Survey	·	830 m	MPC · JPL
506602	2006 BE_{18}	—	January 22, 2006	Mount Lemmon	Mount Lemmon Survey	EUN	1.2 km	MPC · JPL
506603	2006 BS_{19}	—	January 8, 2006	Kitt Peak	Spacewatch	·	980 m	MPC · JPL
506604	2006 BP_{20}	—	January 9, 2006	Kitt Peak	Spacewatch	·	1.2 km	MPC · JPL
506605	2006 BW_{34}	—	January 22, 2006	Mount Lemmon	Mount Lemmon Survey	·	810 m	MPC · JPL
506606	2006 BJ_{138}	—	January 28, 2006	Mount Lemmon	Mount Lemmon Survey	(5)	890 m	MPC · JPL
506607	2006 BX_{143}	—	January 22, 2006	Anderson Mesa	LONEOS	·	1.7 km	MPC · JPL
506608	2006 BA_{185}	—	January 10, 2006	Mount Lemmon	Mount Lemmon Survey	·	1.0 km	MPC · JPL
506609	2006 BS_{196}	—	January 30, 2006	Kitt Peak	Spacewatch	·	730 m	MPC · JPL
506610	2006 CV_{22}	—	February 1, 2006	Mount Lemmon	Mount Lemmon Survey	·	1.4 km	MPC · JPL
506611	2006 CP_{26}	—	February 2, 2006	Kitt Peak	Spacewatch	·	1.2 km	MPC · JPL
506612	2006 DU_{6}	—	February 20, 2006	Mount Lemmon	Mount Lemmon Survey	·	1.2 km	MPC · JPL
506613	2006 DW_{48}	—	February 21, 2006	Mount Lemmon	Mount Lemmon Survey	·	1.6 km	MPC · JPL
506614	2006 DU_{68}	—	February 26, 2006	Anderson Mesa	LONEOS	BAR	1.1 km	MPC · JPL
506615	2006 DX_{74}	—	February 1, 2006	Kitt Peak	Spacewatch	·	1.7 km	MPC · JPL
506616	2006 DH_{90}	—	February 24, 2006	Kitt Peak	Spacewatch	·	970 m	MPC · JPL
506617	2006 DH_{118}	—	February 27, 2006	Kitt Peak	Spacewatch	·	1.5 km	MPC · JPL
506618	2006 DC_{140}	—	February 2, 2006	Mount Lemmon	Mount Lemmon Survey	·	1.3 km	MPC · JPL
506619	2006 EB_{11}	—	March 2, 2006	Kitt Peak	Spacewatch	·	1.1 km	MPC · JPL
506620	2006 ES_{51}	—	March 4, 2006	Kitt Peak	Spacewatch	·	1.6 km	MPC · JPL
506621	2006 FF_{1}	—	March 21, 2006	Mount Lemmon	Mount Lemmon Survey	H	520 m	MPC · JPL
506622	2006 FV_{55}	—	March 25, 2006	Kitt Peak	Spacewatch	3:2	4.8 km	MPC · JPL
506623	2006 GA_{13}	—	March 23, 2006	Kitt Peak	Spacewatch	·	570 m	MPC · JPL
506624	2006 GX_{45}	—	March 25, 2006	Kitt Peak	Spacewatch	H	270 m	MPC · JPL
506625	2006 GX_{52}	—	April 8, 2006	Siding Spring	SSS	·	1.8 km	MPC · JPL
506626	2006 HG_{74}	—	April 25, 2006	Kitt Peak	Spacewatch	·	1.5 km	MPC · JPL
506627	2006 JR_{11}	—	April 19, 2006	Kitt Peak	Spacewatch	·	670 m	MPC · JPL
506628	2006 JS_{16}	—	April 24, 2006	Kitt Peak	Spacewatch	·	660 m	MPC · JPL
506629	2006 JV_{20}	—	February 27, 2006	Kitt Peak	Spacewatch	HNS	1.5 km	MPC · JPL
506630	2006 KO_{14}	—	May 20, 2006	Anderson Mesa	LONEOS	EUN	1.3 km	MPC · JPL
506631	2006 KZ_{54}	—	May 21, 2006	Kitt Peak	Spacewatch	·	2.3 km	MPC · JPL
506632	2006 KT_{101}	—	May 9, 2006	Mount Lemmon	Mount Lemmon Survey	·	610 m	MPC · JPL
506633	2006 PZ_{4}	—	August 12, 2006	Palomar	NEAT	PHO	1.0 km	MPC · JPL
506634	2006 QT_{2}	—	August 17, 2006	Palomar	NEAT	·	1.5 km	MPC · JPL
506635	2006 QB_{27}	—	August 19, 2006	Kitt Peak	Spacewatch	MAS	750 m	MPC · JPL
506636	2006 QF_{180}	—	August 21, 2006	Kitt Peak	Spacewatch	NYS	860 m	MPC · JPL
506637	2006 RD_{6}	—	August 19, 2006	Anderson Mesa	LONEOS	·	3.0 km	MPC · JPL
506638	2006 RV_{25}	—	August 29, 2006	Kitt Peak	Spacewatch	·	2.3 km	MPC · JPL
506639	2006 RO_{42}	—	September 14, 2006	Kitt Peak	Spacewatch	·	2.5 km	MPC · JPL
506640	2006 RW_{42}	—	September 14, 2006	Kitt Peak	Spacewatch	EOS	1.4 km	MPC · JPL
506641	2006 RH_{50}	—	September 14, 2006	Kitt Peak	Spacewatch	THM	1.9 km	MPC · JPL
506642	2006 RE_{54}	—	September 14, 2006	Kitt Peak	Spacewatch	·	1.8 km	MPC · JPL
506643	2006 RG_{58}	—	September 15, 2006	Kitt Peak	Spacewatch	H	440 m	MPC · JPL
506644	2006 RN_{67}	—	August 29, 2006	Catalina	CSS	·	2.0 km	MPC · JPL
506645	2006 RE_{75}	—	September 15, 2006	Kitt Peak	Spacewatch	·	720 m	MPC · JPL
506646	2006 RK_{78}	—	September 15, 2006	Kitt Peak	Spacewatch	MAS	530 m	MPC · JPL
506647	2006 RT_{95}	—	September 15, 2006	Kitt Peak	Spacewatch	MAS	570 m	MPC · JPL
506648	2006 RP_{122}	—	August 27, 2006	Kitt Peak	Spacewatch	·	760 m	MPC · JPL
506649	2006 SE_{37}	—	September 17, 2006	Kitt Peak	Spacewatch	·	1.8 km	MPC · JPL
506650	2006 SZ_{49}	—	September 18, 2006	Kitt Peak	Spacewatch	·	960 m	MPC · JPL
506651	2006 SR_{50}	—	September 16, 2006	Catalina	CSS	·	900 m	MPC · JPL
506652	2006 SO_{103}	—	September 19, 2006	Kitt Peak	Spacewatch	·	1.8 km	MPC · JPL
506653	2006 SL_{116}	—	September 24, 2006	Kitt Peak	Spacewatch	THM	1.8 km	MPC · JPL
506654	2006 SE_{133}	—	September 17, 2006	Catalina	CSS	H	620 m	MPC · JPL
506655	2006 SZ_{142}	—	September 19, 2006	Kitt Peak	Spacewatch	EOS	1.5 km	MPC · JPL
506656	2006 SJ_{148}	—	September 19, 2006	Catalina	CSS	·	710 m	MPC · JPL
506657	2006 SX_{154}	—	September 22, 2006	Kitt Peak	Spacewatch	·	2.5 km	MPC · JPL
506658	2006 SL_{161}	—	September 23, 2006	Kitt Peak	Spacewatch	·	670 m	MPC · JPL
506659	2006 SS_{200}	—	September 24, 2006	Kitt Peak	Spacewatch	·	2.1 km	MPC · JPL
506660	2006 SF_{204}	—	September 25, 2006	Kitt Peak	Spacewatch	·	850 m	MPC · JPL
506661	2006 SV_{211}	—	September 18, 2006	Kitt Peak	Spacewatch	·	700 m	MPC · JPL
506662	2006 SX_{225}	—	September 26, 2006	Kitt Peak	Spacewatch	·	1.1 km	MPC · JPL
506663	2006 SL_{241}	—	September 18, 2006	Kitt Peak	Spacewatch	·	2.1 km	MPC · JPL
506664	2006 SH_{255}	—	September 26, 2006	Mount Lemmon	Mount Lemmon Survey	NYS	540 m	MPC · JPL
506665	2006 SO_{265}	—	September 26, 2006	Kitt Peak	Spacewatch	·	790 m	MPC · JPL
506666	2006 SU_{268}	—	September 26, 2006	Kitt Peak	Spacewatch	·	820 m	MPC · JPL
506667	2006 SL_{279}	—	September 28, 2006	Mount Lemmon	Mount Lemmon Survey	·	2.7 km	MPC · JPL
506668	2006 SD_{285}	—	September 28, 2006	Kitt Peak	Spacewatch	·	620 m	MPC · JPL
506669	2006 SG_{286}	—	September 19, 2006	Catalina	CSS	·	960 m	MPC · JPL
506670	2006 SS_{298}	—	September 25, 2006	Kitt Peak	Spacewatch	NYS	670 m	MPC · JPL
506671	2006 SN_{324}	—	September 17, 2006	Kitt Peak	Spacewatch	·	2.6 km	MPC · JPL
506672	2006 SL_{333}	—	September 28, 2006	Kitt Peak	Spacewatch	·	1.6 km	MPC · JPL
506673	2006 SR_{348}	—	September 19, 2006	Kitt Peak	Spacewatch	·	2.2 km	MPC · JPL
506674	2006 SO_{350}	—	September 30, 2006	Catalina	CSS	·	1.8 km	MPC · JPL
506675	2006 SA_{361}	—	September 30, 2006	Mount Lemmon	Mount Lemmon Survey	·	2.5 km	MPC · JPL
506676	2006 SH_{397}	—	September 25, 2006	Mount Lemmon	Mount Lemmon Survey	·	1.6 km	MPC · JPL
506677	2006 SH_{399}	—	September 17, 2006	Kitt Peak	Spacewatch	THM	1.6 km	MPC · JPL
506678	2006 SH_{402}	—	September 25, 2006	Kitt Peak	Spacewatch	·	1.6 km	MPC · JPL
506679	2006 SS_{403}	—	September 28, 2006	Mount Lemmon	Mount Lemmon Survey	·	2.1 km	MPC · JPL
506680	2006 SE_{407}	—	September 19, 2006	Kitt Peak	Spacewatch	·	1.9 km	MPC · JPL
506681	2006 SE_{408}	—	September 27, 2006	Mount Lemmon	Mount Lemmon Survey	·	2.1 km	MPC · JPL
506682	2006 SF_{411}	—	September 26, 2006	Mount Lemmon	Mount Lemmon Survey	THM	1.9 km	MPC · JPL
506683	2006 TN_{17}	—	October 11, 2006	Kitt Peak	Spacewatch	·	950 m	MPC · JPL
506684	2006 TZ_{19}	—	October 11, 2006	Kitt Peak	Spacewatch	·	770 m	MPC · JPL
506685	2006 TG_{28}	—	October 12, 2006	Kitt Peak	Spacewatch	·	720 m	MPC · JPL
506686	2006 TJ_{28}	—	September 30, 2006	Mount Lemmon	Mount Lemmon Survey	·	800 m	MPC · JPL
506687	2006 TV_{29}	—	October 4, 2006	Mount Lemmon	Mount Lemmon Survey	MAS	610 m	MPC · JPL
506688	2006 TW_{33}	—	September 26, 2006	Mount Lemmon	Mount Lemmon Survey	·	3.2 km	MPC · JPL
506689	2006 TW_{49}	—	October 2, 2006	Mount Lemmon	Mount Lemmon Survey	LIX	3.7 km	MPC · JPL
506690	2006 TZ_{50}	—	October 12, 2006	Kitt Peak	Spacewatch	·	3.1 km	MPC · JPL
506691	2006 TN_{82}	—	October 13, 2006	Kitt Peak	Spacewatch	·	1.8 km	MPC · JPL
506692	2006 TO_{88}	—	October 2, 2006	Mount Lemmon	Mount Lemmon Survey	·	1.7 km	MPC · JPL
506693	2006 TU_{90}	—	October 13, 2006	Kitt Peak	Spacewatch	·	1.6 km	MPC · JPL
506694	2006 TA_{92}	—	September 27, 2006	Mount Lemmon	Mount Lemmon Survey	MAS	510 m	MPC · JPL
506695	2006 TB_{93}	—	October 15, 2006	Kitt Peak	Spacewatch	·	820 m	MPC · JPL
506696	2006 TV_{100}	—	October 2, 2006	Mount Lemmon	Mount Lemmon Survey	NYS	680 m	MPC · JPL
506697	2006 UZ	—	October 16, 2006	Kitt Peak	Spacewatch	·	2.3 km	MPC · JPL
506698	2006 US_{51}	—	October 17, 2006	Kitt Peak	Spacewatch	·	2.5 km	MPC · JPL
506699	2006 UD_{58}	—	September 30, 2006	Mount Lemmon	Mount Lemmon Survey	NYS	820 m	MPC · JPL
506700	2006 UM_{59}	—	September 28, 2006	Catalina	CSS	·	3.0 km	MPC · JPL

== 506701–506800 ==
back to top

Designation			Discovery			Properties		Ref
Permanent	Provisional	Named after	Date	Site	Discoverer(s)	Category	Diam.	Ref
506701	2006 UF_{76}	—	October 17, 2006	Mount Lemmon	Mount Lemmon Survey	EUP	3.5 km	MPC · JPL
506702	2006 UP_{76}	—	September 26, 2006	Kitt Peak	Spacewatch	·	2.0 km	MPC · JPL
506703	2006 UD_{77}	—	September 26, 2006	Kitt Peak	Spacewatch	·	2.0 km	MPC · JPL
506704	2006 UR_{81}	—	October 17, 2006	Mount Lemmon	Mount Lemmon Survey	·	1.2 km	MPC · JPL
506705	2006 UD_{86}	—	September 17, 2006	Kitt Peak	Spacewatch	·	820 m	MPC · JPL
506706	2006 UA_{89}	—	October 17, 2006	Kitt Peak	Spacewatch	·	2.5 km	MPC · JPL
506707	2006 UE_{93}	—	October 18, 2006	Kitt Peak	Spacewatch	·	2.0 km	MPC · JPL
506708	2006 UB_{97}	—	October 3, 2006	Mount Lemmon	Mount Lemmon Survey	·	1.9 km	MPC · JPL
506709	2006 UU_{112}	—	October 19, 2006	Kitt Peak	Spacewatch	·	1.8 km	MPC · JPL
506710	2006 UE_{117}	—	September 25, 2006	Mount Lemmon	Mount Lemmon Survey	·	2.2 km	MPC · JPL
506711	2006 UN_{154}	—	October 2, 2006	Mount Lemmon	Mount Lemmon Survey	·	780 m	MPC · JPL
506712	2006 UC_{157}	—	September 27, 2006	Kitt Peak	Spacewatch	·	1.7 km	MPC · JPL
506713	2006 UY_{166}	—	October 21, 2006	Mount Lemmon	Mount Lemmon Survey	·	2.4 km	MPC · JPL
506714	2006 UB_{190}	—	October 19, 2006	Catalina	CSS	·	3.0 km	MPC · JPL
506715	2006 UE_{196}	—	October 20, 2006	Kitt Peak	Spacewatch	·	780 m	MPC · JPL
506716	2006 UY_{200}	—	October 21, 2006	Kitt Peak	Spacewatch	·	1.1 km	MPC · JPL
506717	2006 UZ_{213}	—	October 23, 2006	Kitt Peak	Spacewatch	·	2.7 km	MPC · JPL
506718	2006 UT_{220}	—	October 17, 2006	Kitt Peak	Spacewatch	·	2.9 km	MPC · JPL
506719	2006 UY_{220}	—	October 4, 2006	Mount Lemmon	Mount Lemmon Survey	·	770 m	MPC · JPL
506720	2006 UF_{227}	—	September 26, 2006	Kitt Peak	Spacewatch	·	2.3 km	MPC · JPL
506721	2006 UE_{237}	—	September 30, 2006	Mount Lemmon	Mount Lemmon Survey	·	1.8 km	MPC · JPL
506722	2006 UM_{247}	—	September 28, 2006	Mount Lemmon	Mount Lemmon Survey	·	1.9 km	MPC · JPL
506723	2006 UQ_{250}	—	October 27, 2006	Mount Lemmon	Mount Lemmon Survey	THM	1.9 km	MPC · JPL
506724	2006 UK_{254}	—	October 27, 2006	Mount Lemmon	Mount Lemmon Survey	H	450 m	MPC · JPL
506725	2006 UF_{260}	—	September 27, 2006	Mount Lemmon	Mount Lemmon Survey	·	1.1 km	MPC · JPL
506726	2006 UQ_{263}	—	October 27, 2006	Kitt Peak	Spacewatch	·	1.9 km	MPC · JPL
506727	2006 UH_{268}	—	September 27, 2006	Mount Lemmon	Mount Lemmon Survey	·	990 m	MPC · JPL
506728	2006 UR_{272}	—	October 27, 2006	Kitt Peak	Spacewatch	·	2.9 km	MPC · JPL
506729	2006 UN_{274}	—	September 25, 2006	Mount Lemmon	Mount Lemmon Survey	EOS	1.2 km	MPC · JPL
506730	2006 UM_{287}	—	October 16, 2006	Kitt Peak	Spacewatch	·	2.6 km	MPC · JPL
506731	2006 UX_{288}	—	September 17, 2006	Kitt Peak	Spacewatch	·	1.6 km	MPC · JPL
506732	2006 VW_{2}	—	November 11, 2006	Mount Lemmon	Mount Lemmon Survey	APO · PHA	190 m	MPC · JPL
506733	2006 VW_{10}	—	September 30, 2006	Mount Lemmon	Mount Lemmon Survey	·	3.1 km	MPC · JPL
506734	2006 VY_{18}	—	September 30, 2006	Mount Lemmon	Mount Lemmon Survey	·	720 m	MPC · JPL
506735	2006 VA_{30}	—	November 10, 2006	Kitt Peak	Spacewatch	EUP	3.1 km	MPC · JPL
506736	2006 VU_{32}	—	October 18, 2006	Kitt Peak	Spacewatch	·	930 m	MPC · JPL
506737	2006 VW_{38}	—	October 27, 2006	Mount Lemmon	Mount Lemmon Survey	THM	1.7 km	MPC · JPL
506738	2006 VY_{38}	—	October 13, 2006	Kitt Peak	Spacewatch	·	2.0 km	MPC · JPL
506739	2006 VT_{40}	—	September 28, 2006	Mount Lemmon	Mount Lemmon Survey	THM	1.6 km	MPC · JPL
506740	2006 VU_{53}	—	November 11, 2006	Kitt Peak	Spacewatch	VER	2.4 km	MPC · JPL
506741	2006 VG_{59}	—	October 23, 2006	Mount Lemmon	Mount Lemmon Survey	·	2.3 km	MPC · JPL
506742	2006 VG_{60}	—	September 30, 2006	Mount Lemmon	Mount Lemmon Survey	NYS	770 m	MPC · JPL
506743	2006 VJ_{60}	—	November 11, 2006	Kitt Peak	Spacewatch	·	2.9 km	MPC · JPL
506744	2006 VL_{61}	—	September 27, 2006	Mount Lemmon	Mount Lemmon Survey	THM	2.2 km	MPC · JPL
506745	2006 VG_{62}	—	November 11, 2006	Kitt Peak	Spacewatch	THM	1.8 km	MPC · JPL
506746	2006 VC_{77}	—	November 12, 2006	Mount Lemmon	Mount Lemmon Survey	·	1.9 km	MPC · JPL
506747	2006 VC_{79}	—	October 17, 2006	Mount Lemmon	Mount Lemmon Survey	·	2.1 km	MPC · JPL
506748	2006 VN_{79}	—	October 23, 2006	Mount Lemmon	Mount Lemmon Survey	·	950 m	MPC · JPL
506749	2006 VV_{79}	—	October 3, 2006	Mount Lemmon	Mount Lemmon Survey	NYS	670 m	MPC · JPL
506750	2006 VM_{80}	—	November 12, 2006	Mount Lemmon	Mount Lemmon Survey	·	4.2 km	MPC · JPL
506751	2006 VK_{85}	—	November 13, 2006	Kitt Peak	Spacewatch	PHO	890 m	MPC · JPL
506752	2006 VU_{86}	—	October 13, 2006	Kitt Peak	Spacewatch	·	2.2 km	MPC · JPL
506753	2006 VJ_{104}	—	October 23, 1995	Kitt Peak	Spacewatch	NYS	660 m	MPC · JPL
506754	2006 VP_{137}	—	October 23, 2006	Mount Lemmon	Mount Lemmon Survey	THB	2.1 km	MPC · JPL
506755	2006 VP_{138}	—	November 15, 2006	Kitt Peak	Spacewatch	·	2.2 km	MPC · JPL
506756	2006 VS_{140}	—	November 15, 2006	Kitt Peak	Spacewatch	·	920 m	MPC · JPL
506757	2006 WB_{18}	—	October 17, 2006	Kitt Peak	Spacewatch	·	650 m	MPC · JPL
506758	2006 WP_{41}	—	November 15, 2006	Catalina	CSS	·	1.4 km	MPC · JPL
506759	2006 WC_{49}	—	November 16, 2006	Mount Lemmon	Mount Lemmon Survey	NYS	710 m	MPC · JPL
506760	2006 WN_{65}	—	October 20, 2006	Mount Lemmon	Mount Lemmon Survey	·	3.1 km	MPC · JPL
506761	2006 WH_{68}	—	November 17, 2006	Mount Lemmon	Mount Lemmon Survey	·	1.2 km	MPC · JPL
506762	2006 WH_{94}	—	October 22, 2006	Mount Lemmon	Mount Lemmon Survey	NYS	670 m	MPC · JPL
506763	2006 WH_{102}	—	October 28, 2006	Mount Lemmon	Mount Lemmon Survey	·	2.1 km	MPC · JPL
506764	2006 WZ_{105}	—	November 19, 2006	Kitt Peak	Spacewatch	THM	2.6 km	MPC · JPL
506765	2006 WK_{106}	—	November 11, 2006	Kitt Peak	Spacewatch	·	2.6 km	MPC · JPL
506766	2006 WR_{111}	—	November 19, 2006	Kitt Peak	Spacewatch	MAS	630 m	MPC · JPL
506767	2006 WU_{150}	—	November 20, 2006	Mount Lemmon	Mount Lemmon Survey	·	1.1 km	MPC · JPL
506768	2006 WG_{151}	—	October 23, 2006	Catalina	CSS	·	2.7 km	MPC · JPL
506769	2006 WX_{155}	—	September 28, 2006	Mount Lemmon	Mount Lemmon Survey	·	2.3 km	MPC · JPL
506770	2006 WH_{171}	—	November 23, 2006	Kitt Peak	Spacewatch	NYS	630 m	MPC · JPL
506771	2006 WZ_{178}	—	October 21, 2006	Kitt Peak	Spacewatch	MAS	490 m	MPC · JPL
506772	2006 WV_{200}	—	November 24, 2006	Mount Lemmon	Mount Lemmon Survey	THM	2.0 km	MPC · JPL
506773	2006 WV_{204}	—	November 16, 2006	Mount Lemmon	Mount Lemmon Survey	·	2.2 km	MPC · JPL
506774	2006 WW_{204}	—	November 17, 2006	Kitt Peak	Spacewatch	·	2.5 km	MPC · JPL
506775	2006 XP_{22}	—	December 12, 2006	Kitt Peak	Spacewatch	·	870 m	MPC · JPL
506776	2006 XO_{45}	—	December 13, 2006	Kitt Peak	Spacewatch	·	2.1 km	MPC · JPL
506777	2006 XH_{55}	—	November 17, 2006	Mount Lemmon	Mount Lemmon Survey	H	430 m	MPC · JPL
506778	2006 XE_{61}	—	November 11, 2006	Kitt Peak	Spacewatch	·	1.7 km	MPC · JPL
506779	2006 YY_{2}	—	December 22, 2006	Socorro	LINEAR	AMO +1km	1.0 km	MPC · JPL
506780	2006 YE_{28}	—	December 1, 2006	Mount Lemmon	Mount Lemmon Survey	·	870 m	MPC · JPL
506781	2007 AF_{1}	—	December 21, 2006	Kitt Peak	Spacewatch	·	3.0 km	MPC · JPL
506782	2007 AN_{10}	—	November 18, 2006	Mount Lemmon	Mount Lemmon Survey	·	1.2 km	MPC · JPL
506783	2007 AL_{15}	—	January 10, 2007	Mount Lemmon	Mount Lemmon Survey	T_{j} (2.97)	3.5 km	MPC · JPL
506784	2007 AC_{16}	—	January 10, 2007	Kitt Peak	Spacewatch	T_{j} (2.99)	4.0 km	MPC · JPL
506785	2007 AR_{27}	—	January 10, 2007	Kitt Peak	Spacewatch	·	1.5 km	MPC · JPL
506786	2007 BG_{1}	—	January 16, 2007	Catalina	CSS	·	3.2 km	MPC · JPL
506787	2007 BM_{2}	—	December 24, 2006	Kitt Peak	Spacewatch	CYB	4.2 km	MPC · JPL
506788	2007 BL_{16}	—	January 17, 2007	Catalina	CSS	TIR	3.2 km	MPC · JPL
506789	2007 BY_{42}	—	January 24, 2007	Mount Lemmon	Mount Lemmon Survey	MAS	600 m	MPC · JPL
506790	2007 BK_{47}	—	January 26, 2007	Kitt Peak	Spacewatch	NYS	900 m	MPC · JPL
506791	2007 CP_{19}	—	January 10, 2007	Mount Lemmon	Mount Lemmon Survey	·	1.1 km	MPC · JPL
506792	2007 CU_{27}	—	February 6, 2007	Kitt Peak	Spacewatch	·	1.0 km	MPC · JPL
506793	2007 CB_{33}	—	January 27, 2007	Mount Lemmon	Mount Lemmon Survey	·	850 m	MPC · JPL
506794	2007 CU_{43}	—	February 8, 2007	Kitt Peak	Spacewatch	·	1.5 km	MPC · JPL
506795	2007 DG_{15}	—	February 8, 2007	Kitt Peak	Spacewatch	·	2.6 km	MPC · JPL
506796	2007 DX_{22}	—	February 17, 2007	Kitt Peak	Spacewatch	·	1.1 km	MPC · JPL
506797	2007 DD_{34}	—	February 17, 2007	Kitt Peak	Spacewatch	·	920 m	MPC · JPL
506798	2007 DS_{34}	—	February 17, 2007	Kitt Peak	Spacewatch	·	1.1 km	MPC · JPL
506799	2007 DN_{61}	—	December 27, 2006	Catalina	CSS	·	1.5 km	MPC · JPL
506800	2007 EQ_{28}	—	January 27, 2007	Kitt Peak	Spacewatch	·	800 m	MPC · JPL

== 506801–506900 ==
back to top

Designation			Discovery			Properties		Ref
Permanent	Provisional	Named after	Date	Site	Discoverer(s)	Category	Diam.	Ref
506801	2007 GT_{16}	—	April 11, 2007	Kitt Peak	Spacewatch	·	1.2 km	MPC · JPL
506802	2007 GG_{35}	—	March 13, 2007	Mount Lemmon	Mount Lemmon Survey	·	1.3 km	MPC · JPL
506803	2007 HE_{34}	—	April 11, 2007	Mount Lemmon	Mount Lemmon Survey	·	1.2 km	MPC · JPL
506804	2007 HH_{87}	—	April 24, 2007	Kitt Peak	Spacewatch	·	1.2 km	MPC · JPL
506805	2007 JL_{46}	—	February 26, 2014	Haleakala	Pan-STARRS 1	3:2	4.9 km	MPC · JPL
506806	2007 LE_{22}	—	March 25, 2007	Mount Lemmon	Mount Lemmon Survey	·	1.9 km	MPC · JPL
506807	2007 MZ_{2}	—	June 16, 2007	Kitt Peak	Spacewatch	·	1.4 km	MPC · JPL
506808	2007 MG_{6}	—	June 22, 2007	Catalina	CSS	·	1.8 km	MPC · JPL
506809	2007 PG_{37}	—	August 13, 2007	Socorro	LINEAR	·	620 m	MPC · JPL
506810	2007 RH_{32}	—	September 5, 2007	Catalina	CSS	·	670 m	MPC · JPL
506811	2007 RP_{40}	—	September 9, 2007	Kitt Peak	Spacewatch	·	560 m	MPC · JPL
506812	2007 RJ_{47}	—	September 9, 2007	Mount Lemmon	Mount Lemmon Survey	·	630 m	MPC · JPL
506813	2007 RQ_{56}	—	September 9, 2007	Kitt Peak	Spacewatch	·	550 m	MPC · JPL
506814	2007 RT_{59}	—	September 4, 2007	Catalina	CSS	·	2.2 km	MPC · JPL
506815	2007 RA_{136}	—	September 13, 2007	Kitt Peak	Spacewatch	·	620 m	MPC · JPL
506816	2007 RX_{225}	—	September 10, 2007	Kitt Peak	Spacewatch	·	1.6 km	MPC · JPL
506817	2007 RD_{288}	—	September 11, 2007	Kitt Peak	Spacewatch	KOR	1.1 km	MPC · JPL
506818	2007 RS_{292}	—	September 12, 2007	Mount Lemmon	Mount Lemmon Survey	KOR	1.1 km	MPC · JPL
506819	2007 RZ_{294}	—	September 14, 2007	Mount Lemmon	Mount Lemmon Survey	EOS	1.3 km	MPC · JPL
506820	2007 SD_{9}	—	September 10, 2007	Kitt Peak	Spacewatch	·	510 m	MPC · JPL
506821	2007 SH_{24}	—	September 24, 2007	Kitt Peak	Spacewatch	·	2.7 km	MPC · JPL
506822	2007 SQ_{24}	—	December 14, 2010	Mount Lemmon	Mount Lemmon Survey	3:2	4.4 km	MPC · JPL
506823	2007 SR_{24}	—	September 24, 2007	Kitt Peak	Spacewatch	·	3.7 km	MPC · JPL
506824	2007 TX_{37}	—	September 9, 2007	Mount Lemmon	Mount Lemmon Survey	·	660 m	MPC · JPL
506825	2007 TZ_{38}	—	October 6, 2007	Kitt Peak	Spacewatch	·	590 m	MPC · JPL
506826	2007 TQ_{51}	—	October 4, 2007	Kitt Peak	Spacewatch	KOR	1.2 km	MPC · JPL
506827	2007 TK_{56}	—	September 8, 2007	Mount Lemmon	Mount Lemmon Survey	·	400 m	MPC · JPL
506828	2007 TE_{82}	—	October 8, 2007	Kitt Peak	Spacewatch	·	520 m	MPC · JPL
506829	2007 TT_{132}	—	October 7, 2007	Mount Lemmon	Mount Lemmon Survey	·	630 m	MPC · JPL
506830	2007 TP_{137}	—	October 8, 2007	Catalina	CSS	·	2.0 km	MPC · JPL
506831	2007 TT_{141}	—	October 9, 2007	Mount Lemmon	Mount Lemmon Survey	·	1.5 km	MPC · JPL
506832	2007 TN_{151}	—	September 8, 2007	Anderson Mesa	LONEOS	·	610 m	MPC · JPL
506833	2007 TL_{189}	—	August 24, 2007	Kitt Peak	Spacewatch	·	1.2 km	MPC · JPL
506834	2007 TN_{238}	—	October 10, 2007	Kitt Peak	Spacewatch	KOR	1.0 km	MPC · JPL
506835	2007 TW_{254}	—	October 9, 2007	Mount Lemmon	Mount Lemmon Survey	H	450 m	MPC · JPL
506836	2007 TH_{267}	—	September 12, 2007	Mount Lemmon	Mount Lemmon Survey	·	480 m	MPC · JPL
506837	2007 TO_{268}	—	October 9, 2007	Kitt Peak	Spacewatch	·	420 m	MPC · JPL
506838	2007 TA_{272}	—	October 9, 2007	Kitt Peak	Spacewatch	·	680 m	MPC · JPL
506839	2007 TM_{315}	—	October 12, 2007	Kitt Peak	Spacewatch	·	440 m	MPC · JPL
506840	2007 TH_{316}	—	October 12, 2007	Kitt Peak	Spacewatch	·	730 m	MPC · JPL
506841	2007 TS_{330}	—	October 7, 2007	Kitt Peak	Spacewatch	·	700 m	MPC · JPL
506842	2007 TD_{339}	—	September 18, 2007	Mount Lemmon	Mount Lemmon Survey	·	1.8 km	MPC · JPL
506843	2007 TD_{385}	—	October 14, 2007	Mount Lemmon	Mount Lemmon Survey	EOS	1.7 km	MPC · JPL
506844	2007 TF_{408}	—	October 15, 2007	Mount Lemmon	Mount Lemmon Survey	·	2.0 km	MPC · JPL
506845	2007 TJ_{430}	—	September 15, 2007	Mount Lemmon	Mount Lemmon Survey	·	2.9 km	MPC · JPL
506846	2007 TC_{446}	—	October 8, 2007	Catalina	CSS	·	730 m	MPC · JPL
506847	2007 US_{9}	—	October 8, 2007	Anderson Mesa	LONEOS	·	480 m	MPC · JPL
506848	2007 UB_{80}	—	October 12, 2007	Kitt Peak	Spacewatch	KOR	1.1 km	MPC · JPL
506849	2007 UU_{90}	—	October 18, 2007	Kitt Peak	Spacewatch	·	1.5 km	MPC · JPL
506850	2007 UF_{99}	—	October 30, 2007	Kitt Peak	Spacewatch	·	2.0 km	MPC · JPL
506851	2007 UX_{100}	—	October 30, 2007	Kitt Peak	Spacewatch	·	2.4 km	MPC · JPL
506852	2007 UD_{119}	—	September 19, 2007	Kitt Peak	Spacewatch	·	2.1 km	MPC · JPL
506853	2007 UT_{128}	—	October 21, 2007	Mount Lemmon	Mount Lemmon Survey	·	620 m	MPC · JPL
506854	2007 VG_{30}	—	September 11, 2007	Mount Lemmon	Mount Lemmon Survey	·	570 m	MPC · JPL
506855	2007 VH_{49}	—	November 1, 2007	Kitt Peak	Spacewatch	·	1.7 km	MPC · JPL
506856	2007 VR_{63}	—	November 1, 2007	Kitt Peak	Spacewatch	·	1.3 km	MPC · JPL
506857	2007 VY_{111}	—	November 3, 2007	Kitt Peak	Spacewatch	KOR	1.2 km	MPC · JPL
506858	2007 VP_{136}	—	October 20, 2007	Kitt Peak	Spacewatch	·	410 m	MPC · JPL
506859	2007 VW_{137}	—	November 8, 2007	Socorro	LINEAR	APO +1km · PHA	800 m	MPC · JPL
506860	2007 VP_{139}	—	October 10, 2007	Kitt Peak	Spacewatch	·	1.8 km	MPC · JPL
506861	2007 VT_{139}	—	October 21, 2007	Mount Lemmon	Mount Lemmon Survey	H	280 m	MPC · JPL
506862	2007 VU_{175}	—	October 8, 2007	Mount Lemmon	Mount Lemmon Survey	KOR	1.2 km	MPC · JPL
506863	2007 VT_{201}	—	October 31, 2007	Mount Lemmon	Mount Lemmon Survey	·	580 m	MPC · JPL
506864	2007 VV_{235}	—	November 11, 2007	Mount Lemmon	Mount Lemmon Survey	·	450 m	MPC · JPL
506865	2007 VV_{280}	—	October 10, 2007	Mount Lemmon	Mount Lemmon Survey	·	690 m	MPC · JPL
506866	2007 VX_{331}	—	November 7, 2007	Mount Lemmon	Mount Lemmon Survey	·	2.1 km	MPC · JPL
506867	2007 WF_{63}	—	November 19, 2007	Mount Lemmon	Mount Lemmon Survey	·	610 m	MPC · JPL
506868	2007 XP_{12}	—	October 14, 2007	Mount Lemmon	Mount Lemmon Survey	·	790 m	MPC · JPL
506869	2007 XX_{51}	—	December 5, 2007	Kitt Peak	Spacewatch	·	1.9 km	MPC · JPL
506870	2007 YK_{16}	—	November 18, 2007	Kitt Peak	Spacewatch	·	2.5 km	MPC · JPL
506871	2007 YR_{26}	—	December 5, 2007	Kitt Peak	Spacewatch	·	2.1 km	MPC · JPL
506872	2007 YH_{35}	—	December 3, 2007	Kitt Peak	Spacewatch	·	2.7 km	MPC · JPL
506873	2007 YG_{47}	—	December 15, 2007	Mount Lemmon	Mount Lemmon Survey	·	2.3 km	MPC · JPL
506874	2007 YU_{69}	—	December 30, 2007	Mount Lemmon	Mount Lemmon Survey	·	2.0 km	MPC · JPL
506875	2008 AN_{9}	—	January 10, 2008	Mount Lemmon	Mount Lemmon Survey	·	700 m	MPC · JPL
506876	2008 AB_{34}	—	December 30, 2007	Kitt Peak	Spacewatch	·	2.0 km	MPC · JPL
506877	2008 AS_{36}	—	December 30, 2007	Kitt Peak	Spacewatch	·	890 m	MPC · JPL
506878	2008 AO_{37}	—	December 30, 2007	Kitt Peak	Spacewatch	·	2.0 km	MPC · JPL
506879	2008 AM_{44}	—	November 7, 2007	Mount Lemmon	Mount Lemmon Survey	·	3.3 km	MPC · JPL
506880	2008 AM_{46}	—	December 5, 2007	Kitt Peak	Spacewatch	EOS	1.6 km	MPC · JPL
506881	2008 AU_{69}	—	December 31, 2007	Mount Lemmon	Mount Lemmon Survey	·	480 m	MPC · JPL
506882	2008 AV_{70}	—	December 31, 2007	Mount Lemmon	Mount Lemmon Survey	·	2.7 km	MPC · JPL
506883	2008 AG_{75}	—	January 11, 2008	Kitt Peak	Spacewatch	·	2.0 km	MPC · JPL
506884	2008 AT_{75}	—	January 11, 2008	Kitt Peak	Spacewatch	·	2.2 km	MPC · JPL
506885	2008 AM_{76}	—	January 12, 2008	Kitt Peak	Spacewatch	·	2.0 km	MPC · JPL
506886	2008 AT_{79}	—	December 14, 2007	Mount Lemmon	Mount Lemmon Survey	·	1.9 km	MPC · JPL
506887	2008 AA_{116}	—	January 13, 2008	Kitt Peak	Spacewatch	·	2.0 km	MPC · JPL
506888	2008 AH_{128}	—	November 11, 2007	Mount Lemmon	Mount Lemmon Survey	·	2.1 km	MPC · JPL
506889	2008 AJ_{128}	—	January 12, 2008	Kitt Peak	Spacewatch	·	2.5 km	MPC · JPL
506890	2008 AK_{128}	—	November 12, 2007	Mount Lemmon	Mount Lemmon Survey	·	2.3 km	MPC · JPL
506891	2008 AR_{136}	—	January 13, 2008	Mount Lemmon	Mount Lemmon Survey	·	2.4 km	MPC · JPL
506892	2008 BQ_{5}	—	December 30, 2007	Mount Lemmon	Mount Lemmon Survey	V	530 m	MPC · JPL
506893	2008 BD_{36}	—	January 30, 2008	Kitt Peak	Spacewatch	·	840 m	MPC · JPL
506894	2008 BA_{53}	—	January 18, 2008	Kitt Peak	Spacewatch	·	3.2 km	MPC · JPL
506895	2008 BQ_{54}	—	January 20, 2008	Kitt Peak	Spacewatch	·	2.4 km	MPC · JPL
506896	2008 CM_{22}	—	January 10, 2008	Catalina	CSS	(22805)	3.5 km	MPC · JPL
506897	2008 CY_{46}	—	February 2, 2008	Kitt Peak	Spacewatch	·	2.5 km	MPC · JPL
506898	2008 CS_{67}	—	February 8, 2008	Mount Lemmon	Mount Lemmon Survey	·	2.6 km	MPC · JPL
506899	2008 CM_{102}	—	February 9, 2008	Mount Lemmon	Mount Lemmon Survey	·	2.6 km	MPC · JPL
506900	2008 CX_{108}	—	February 9, 2008	Mount Lemmon	Mount Lemmon Survey	·	770 m	MPC · JPL

== 506901–507000 ==
back to top

Designation			Discovery			Properties		Ref
Permanent	Provisional	Named after	Date	Site	Discoverer(s)	Category	Diam.	Ref
506901	2008 CU_{127}	—	February 8, 2008	Kitt Peak	Spacewatch	·	590 m	MPC · JPL
506902	2008 CT_{142}	—	February 8, 2008	Kitt Peak	Spacewatch	·	880 m	MPC · JPL
506903	2008 CS_{145}	—	February 9, 2008	Kitt Peak	Spacewatch	·	2.1 km	MPC · JPL
506904	2008 CV_{162}	—	January 31, 2008	Mount Lemmon	Mount Lemmon Survey	·	1.8 km	MPC · JPL
506905	2008 CQ_{169}	—	May 15, 2005	Mount Lemmon	Mount Lemmon Survey	·	1.2 km	MPC · JPL
506906	2008 CK_{194}	—	February 11, 2008	Mount Lemmon	Mount Lemmon Survey	H	480 m	MPC · JPL
506907	2008 CL_{214}	—	February 11, 2008	Mount Lemmon	Mount Lemmon Survey	·	810 m	MPC · JPL
506908	2008 DM_{2}	—	January 30, 2008	Mount Lemmon	Mount Lemmon Survey	·	600 m	MPC · JPL
506909	2008 DW_{3}	—	February 2, 2008	Kitt Peak	Spacewatch	·	880 m	MPC · JPL
506910	2008 DE_{12}	—	February 9, 2008	Kitt Peak	Spacewatch	THM	1.8 km	MPC · JPL
506911	2008 DZ_{14}	—	February 11, 2008	Mount Lemmon	Mount Lemmon Survey	·	2.6 km	MPC · JPL
506912	2008 DE_{49}	—	February 13, 2008	Catalina	CSS	·	900 m	MPC · JPL
506913	2008 DG_{74}	—	February 8, 2008	Kitt Peak	Spacewatch	·	750 m	MPC · JPL
506914	2008 DN_{81}	—	February 27, 2008	Mount Lemmon	Mount Lemmon Survey	·	2.5 km	MPC · JPL
506915	2008 DW_{84}	—	February 26, 2008	Mount Lemmon	Mount Lemmon Survey	MAS	590 m	MPC · JPL
506916	2008 DS_{86}	—	February 28, 2008	Mount Lemmon	Mount Lemmon Survey	THM	1.7 km	MPC · JPL
506917	2008 EK_{11}	—	March 1, 2008	Kitt Peak	Spacewatch	·	2.8 km	MPC · JPL
506918	2008 EE_{39}	—	February 10, 2008	Kitt Peak	Spacewatch	·	1.1 km	MPC · JPL
506919	2008 EB_{73}	—	March 7, 2008	Kitt Peak	Spacewatch	MAS	650 m	MPC · JPL
506920	2008 EQ_{86}	—	February 28, 2008	Kitt Peak	Spacewatch	·	2.9 km	MPC · JPL
506921	2008 ED_{89}	—	March 8, 2008	Socorro	LINEAR	PHO	1.2 km	MPC · JPL
506922	2008 EZ_{118}	—	March 9, 2008	Mount Lemmon	Mount Lemmon Survey	·	2.1 km	MPC · JPL
506923	2008 EF_{123}	—	March 9, 2008	Kitt Peak	Spacewatch	NYS	1.0 km	MPC · JPL
506924	2008 EK_{131}	—	February 27, 2008	Kitt Peak	Spacewatch	·	960 m	MPC · JPL
506925	2008 EF_{160}	—	September 25, 2006	Kitt Peak	Spacewatch	·	700 m	MPC · JPL
506926	2008 FF_{10}	—	February 28, 2008	Mount Lemmon	Mount Lemmon Survey	MAS	550 m	MPC · JPL
506927	2008 FE_{18}	—	February 13, 2008	Kitt Peak	Spacewatch	·	740 m	MPC · JPL
506928	2008 FZ_{20}	—	March 27, 2008	Kitt Peak	Spacewatch	·	1.0 km	MPC · JPL
506929	2008 FF_{22}	—	March 27, 2008	Kitt Peak	Spacewatch	·	850 m	MPC · JPL
506930	2008 FY_{58}	—	March 29, 2008	Kitt Peak	Spacewatch	·	2.5 km	MPC · JPL
506931	2008 FC_{64}	—	February 1, 2008	Kitt Peak	Spacewatch	·	2.4 km	MPC · JPL
506932	2008 FA_{89}	—	March 28, 2008	Mount Lemmon	Mount Lemmon Survey	MAS	550 m	MPC · JPL
506933	2008 FZ_{105}	—	March 5, 2008	Mount Lemmon	Mount Lemmon Survey	·	2.7 km	MPC · JPL
506934	2008 FD_{116}	—	March 15, 2008	Kitt Peak	Spacewatch	·	2.1 km	MPC · JPL
506935	2008 GU_{8}	—	April 1, 2008	Mount Lemmon	Mount Lemmon Survey	·	2.8 km	MPC · JPL
506936	2008 GL_{33}	—	March 27, 2008	Mount Lemmon	Mount Lemmon Survey	THM	1.9 km	MPC · JPL
506937	2008 GG_{89}	—	March 12, 2008	Mount Lemmon	Mount Lemmon Survey	ERI	1.2 km	MPC · JPL
506938	2008 GQ_{89}	—	March 10, 2008	Kitt Peak	Spacewatch	·	2.7 km	MPC · JPL
506939	2008 GC_{92}	—	February 28, 2008	Mount Lemmon	Mount Lemmon Survey	·	1.1 km	MPC · JPL
506940	2008 GH_{100}	—	April 9, 2008	Kitt Peak	Spacewatch	·	1.0 km	MPC · JPL
506941	2008 GH_{114}	—	March 31, 2008	Mount Lemmon	Mount Lemmon Survey	H	540 m	MPC · JPL
506942	2008 GF_{130}	—	April 5, 2008	Mount Lemmon	Mount Lemmon Survey	·	960 m	MPC · JPL
506943	2008 HL_{6}	—	April 9, 2008	Kitt Peak	Spacewatch	MAS	670 m	MPC · JPL
506944	2008 HG_{26}	—	April 27, 2008	Kitt Peak	Spacewatch	·	1.1 km	MPC · JPL
506945	2008 HC_{43}	—	April 27, 2008	Kitt Peak	Spacewatch	H	440 m	MPC · JPL
506946	2008 HS_{63}	—	April 29, 2008	Kitt Peak	Spacewatch	·	950 m	MPC · JPL
506947	2008 KW_{9}	—	May 14, 2008	Kitt Peak	Spacewatch	H	470 m	MPC · JPL
506948	2008 KE_{10}	—	May 13, 2008	Mount Lemmon	Mount Lemmon Survey	H	500 m	MPC · JPL
506949	2008 KK_{11}	—	May 29, 2008	Kitt Peak	Spacewatch	H	510 m	MPC · JPL
506950	2008 KL_{18}	—	May 28, 2008	Kitt Peak	Spacewatch	H	530 m	MPC · JPL
506951	2008 KV_{28}	—	May 31, 2008	Kitt Peak	Spacewatch	AMO	250 m	MPC · JPL
506952	2008 KV_{32}	—	April 29, 2008	Kitt Peak	Spacewatch	·	2.7 km	MPC · JPL
506953	2008 KC_{34}	—	May 30, 2008	Mount Lemmon	Mount Lemmon Survey	·	1.1 km	MPC · JPL
506954	2008 LY_{10}	—	May 28, 2008	Mount Lemmon	Mount Lemmon Survey	PHO	950 m	MPC · JPL
506955	2008 MO_{1}	—	May 26, 2008	Kitt Peak	Spacewatch	·	3.5 km	MPC · JPL
506956	2008 NX_{1}	—	May 31, 2008	Mount Lemmon	Mount Lemmon Survey	·	1.4 km	MPC · JPL
506957	2008 PR_{19}	—	August 7, 2008	Kitt Peak	Spacewatch	·	1.3 km	MPC · JPL
506958	2008 QR_{20}	—	July 26, 2008	Siding Spring	SSS	·	1.6 km	MPC · JPL
506959	2008 QL_{41}	—	August 21, 2008	Kitt Peak	Spacewatch	·	1.1 km	MPC · JPL
506960	2008 QE_{46}	—	August 20, 2008	Kitt Peak	Spacewatch	·	1.4 km	MPC · JPL
506961	2008 RM_{82}	—	September 4, 2008	Kitt Peak	Spacewatch	·	1.1 km	MPC · JPL
506962	2008 RQ_{87}	—	September 5, 2008	Kitt Peak	Spacewatch	·	1.6 km	MPC · JPL
506963	2008 RB_{88}	—	September 5, 2008	Kitt Peak	Spacewatch	·	1.7 km	MPC · JPL
506964	2008 RB_{92}	—	November 10, 2004	Kitt Peak	Spacewatch	·	1.3 km	MPC · JPL
506965	2008 RM_{92}	—	September 6, 2008	Kitt Peak	Spacewatch	·	1.1 km	MPC · JPL
506966	2008 RC_{107}	—	September 7, 2008	Mount Lemmon	Mount Lemmon Survey	T_{j} (2.95) · 3:2	3.9 km	MPC · JPL
506967	2008 RT_{119}	—	September 4, 2008	Kitt Peak	Spacewatch	·	1.5 km	MPC · JPL
506968	2008 RQ_{129}	—	September 8, 2008	Kitt Peak	Spacewatch	·	1.6 km	MPC · JPL
506969	2008 RC_{130}	—	September 9, 2008	Catalina	CSS	EUN	1.4 km	MPC · JPL
506970	2008 RB_{141}	—	July 29, 2008	Kitt Peak	Spacewatch	·	1.5 km	MPC · JPL
506971	2008 SD_{31}	—	September 20, 2008	Kitt Peak	Spacewatch	·	1.6 km	MPC · JPL
506972	2008 SP_{39}	—	September 20, 2008	Kitt Peak	Spacewatch	·	1.4 km	MPC · JPL
506973	2008 SE_{86}	—	September 5, 2008	Kitt Peak	Spacewatch	EUN	820 m	MPC · JPL
506974	2008 SU_{94}	—	September 21, 2008	Kitt Peak	Spacewatch	·	1.6 km	MPC · JPL
506975	2008 SP_{103}	—	September 21, 2008	Catalina	CSS	·	1.7 km	MPC · JPL
506976	2008 SU_{123}	—	September 22, 2008	Mount Lemmon	Mount Lemmon Survey	·	1.5 km	MPC · JPL
506977	2008 SR_{127}	—	September 22, 2008	Kitt Peak	Spacewatch	·	1.4 km	MPC · JPL
506978	2008 SG_{136}	—	September 23, 2008	Kitt Peak	Spacewatch	·	1.5 km	MPC · JPL
506979	2008 SQ_{154}	—	September 22, 2008	Socorro	LINEAR	·	1.4 km	MPC · JPL
506980	2008 SE_{162}	—	September 28, 2008	Socorro	LINEAR	·	1.3 km	MPC · JPL
506981	2008 SR_{171}	—	August 24, 2008	Kitt Peak	Spacewatch	·	1.4 km	MPC · JPL
506982	2008 SA_{184}	—	September 24, 2008	Kitt Peak	Spacewatch	·	1.7 km	MPC · JPL
506983	2008 SK_{184}	—	September 9, 2008	Mount Lemmon	Mount Lemmon Survey	JUN	1.0 km	MPC · JPL
506984	2008 SU_{197}	—	September 25, 2008	Kitt Peak	Spacewatch	·	1.5 km	MPC · JPL
506985	2008 SG_{200}	—	September 26, 2008	Kitt Peak	Spacewatch	·	1.4 km	MPC · JPL
506986	2008 SE_{205}	—	September 26, 2008	Kitt Peak	Spacewatch	·	1.9 km	MPC · JPL
506987	2008 SC_{206}	—	September 26, 2008	Kitt Peak	Spacewatch	·	1.7 km	MPC · JPL
506988	2008 SK_{218}	—	July 30, 2008	Mount Lemmon	Mount Lemmon Survey	·	1.6 km	MPC · JPL
506989	2008 SM_{218}	—	September 29, 2008	La Sagra	OAM	MAR	1.2 km	MPC · JPL
506990	2008 SF_{226}	—	September 26, 2008	Kitt Peak	Spacewatch	·	1.7 km	MPC · JPL
506991	2008 SY_{234}	—	September 4, 2008	Kitt Peak	Spacewatch	·	1.5 km	MPC · JPL
506992	2008 SZ_{239}	—	September 29, 2008	Kitt Peak	Spacewatch	·	1.5 km	MPC · JPL
506993	2008 SY_{264}	—	September 26, 2008	Kitt Peak	Spacewatch	·	1.4 km	MPC · JPL
506994	2008 SQ_{268}	—	September 28, 2008	Mount Lemmon	Mount Lemmon Survey	·	2.7 km	MPC · JPL
506995	2008 SA_{289}	—	September 25, 2008	Kitt Peak	Spacewatch	·	1.2 km	MPC · JPL
506996	2008 SJ_{289}	—	September 25, 2008	Mount Lemmon	Mount Lemmon Survey	·	1.8 km	MPC · JPL
506997	2008 SD_{297}	—	September 23, 2008	Catalina	CSS	JUN	910 m	MPC · JPL
506998	2008 SQ_{308}	—	September 30, 2008	Mount Lemmon	Mount Lemmon Survey	·	1.7 km	MPC · JPL
506999	2008 TJ_{23}	—	September 7, 2008	Mount Lemmon	Mount Lemmon Survey	·	1.3 km	MPC · JPL
507000	2008 TM_{29}	—	October 1, 2008	Mount Lemmon	Mount Lemmon Survey	·	1.2 km	MPC · JPL

back to top

== Meaning of names ==
As minor planet discoveries are confirmed, they are given a permanent number by the IAU's Minor Planet Center (MPC), and the discoverers can then submit names for them, following the IAU's naming conventions. The list below concerns those minor planets in the specified number-range that have received names, and explains the meanings of those names.

Official naming citations of newly named small Solar System bodies are approved and published in a bulletin by IAU's Working Group for Small Bodies Nomenclature (WGSBN). Before May 2021, citations were published in MPC's Minor Planet Circulars for many decades. Recent citations can also be found on the JPL Small-Body Database (SBDB). Until his death in 2016, German astronomer Lutz D. Schmadel compiled these citations into the Dictionary of Minor Planet Names (DMP) and regularly updated the collection.

Based on Paul Herget's The Names of the Minor Planets, Schmadel also researched the unclear origin of numerous asteroids, most of which had been named prior to World War II. This article incorporates text from this source, which is in the public domain: SBDB New namings may only be added to this list below after official publication as the preannouncement of names is condemned. The WGSBN publishes a comprehensive guideline for the naming rules of non-cometary small Solar System bodies.

Named minor planet	Provisional	This minor planet was named for...	Ref · Catalog
506074 Svarog	2015 UM_{67}	Svarog, a Slavic god	IAU · 506074
