= Matthew J. Holman =

Smithsonian astrophysicist and lecturer (born 1967)

Matthew Holman
- Born: 1967 (age 58–59); United States
- Education: Massachusetts Institute of Technology
- Known for: Planetary science
- Awards: Newcomb Cleveland Prize in 1998
- Scientific career
- Fields: Astrophysics
- Workplaces: Center for Astrophysics | Harvard & Smithsonian

Matthew J. Holman (born 1967) is a Smithsonian astrophysicist and lecturer at Harvard University. Holman studied at MIT, where he received his bachelor's degree in mathematics in 1989 and his PhD in planetary science in 1994. He was awarded the Newcomb Cleveland Prize in 1998.

From 25 January 2015 to 9 February 2021, he held the position of an interim director of IAU's Minor Planet Center (MPC), after former director Timothy B. Spahr had stepped down. Holman was followed by Matthew Payne as new director of the MPC.

He was a Salina Central High School (Kansas) classmate and fellow debate team member of Joe Miller, Alaskan Senate candidate. The main-belt asteroid 3666 Holman was named in his honour in 1999 (M.P.C. 34619).

== Discoveries ==
Minor planets discovered: 11
(44594) 1999 OX3	21 July 1999	list^{[A]}^{[B]}^{[C]}
(45802) 2000 PV_{29}	5 August 2000	list
(54520) 2000 PJ_{30}	5 August 2000	list
(60620) 2000 FD_{8}	27 March 2000	list^{[A]}^{[B]}^{[C]}
(60621) 2000 FE8	27 March 2000	list^{[A]}^{[B]}^{[C]}
(76803) 2000 PK_{30}	5 August 2000	list
(182222) 2000 YU_{1}	16 December 2000	list^{[B]}^{[D]}
(182223) 2000 YC_{2}	17 December 2000	list^{[B]}^{[D]}
(468422) 2000 FA_{8}	27 March 2000	list^{[A]}^{[B]}^{[C]}
(469333) 2000 PE_{30}	5 August 2000	list
(506439) 2000 YB_{2}	16 December 2000	list^{[B]}^{[D]}
Co-discovery made with:^{A} J. J. Kavelaars · ^{B} B. Gladman · ^{C} J.-M. Petit · ^{D} T. Grav

For the period between 1999 and 2000, Holman is credited by the MPC with the discovery and co-discovery of several trans-Neptunian objects such as (44594) 1999 OX3 and (60621) 2000 FE8 (see table) and has been an active observer of centaurs.

He was also part of a team that discovered numerous irregular moons:

- Discovered moons of Neptune (full list):
  - Halimede (Neptune IX) – in 2002 with J.J. Kavelaars, T. Grav, W. Fraser and D. Milisavljevic (IAUC 8047)
  - Sao (Neptune XI) – in 2002 with J.J. Kavelaars, T. Grav, W. Fraser, D. Milisavljevic (IAUC 8047)
  - Laomedeia (Neptune XII) – in 2002, with J.J. Kavelaars, T. Grav, W. Fraser, D. Milisavljevic (IAUC 8047)
  - Neso (Neptune XIII) – in 2002, with B. Gladman et al. (IAUC 8213)
- Discovered moons of Uranus (full list):
  - Prospero (Uranus XVIII) – in 1999, with J.J. Kavelaars, B. Gladman, J.-M. Petit, H. Scholl (IAUC 7248)
  - Setebos (Uranus XIX) – in 1999, with J.J. Kavelaars, B. Gladman, J.-M. Petit, H. Scholl (IAUC 7230)
  - Stephano (Uranus XX) – in 1999, with B. Gladman, J.J. Kavelaars, J.-M. Petit, H. Scholl (IAUC 7230)
  - Trinculo (Uranus XXI) – in 2001, with J.J. Kavelaars, D. Milisavljevic (IAUC 7980)
  - Francisco (Uranus XXII) – in 2001, with J.J. Kavelaars, D. Milisavljevic, T. Grav (IAUC 8216, IAUC 7980)
  - Ferdinand (Uranus XXIV) – in 2001, with D. Milisavljevic, J.J. Kavelaars, T. Grav (IAUC 8213)
- Discovered moons of Saturn (full list):
  - Albiorix (Saturn XXVI) – in 2000, with T.B. Spahr (IAUC 7545)

== See also ==
- List of minor planet discoverers
