= List of minor planets: 873001–874000 =

The following is a partial list of minor planets, running from minor-planet number 873001 through 874000, inclusive. The primary data for this and other partial lists is based on JPL's "Small-Body Orbital Elements" and data available from the Minor Planet Center. Critical list information is also provided by the MPC, unless otherwise specified from Lowell Observatory. A detailed description of the table's columns and additional sources are given on the main page including a complete list of every page in this series, and a statistical break-up on the dynamical classification of minor planets.

Also see the summary list of all named bodies in numerical and alphabetical order, and the corresponding naming citations for the number range of this particular list. New namings may only be added to this list after official publication, as the preannouncement of names is condemned by the Working Group for Small Bodies Nomenclature of the International Astronomical Union.

Near-Earth obj.	MBA (inner)	MBA (outer)	Centaur
Mars-crosser	MBA (middle)	Jupiter trojan	Trans-Neptunian obj.
Unclassified

== 873001–873100 ==
Designation			Discovery			Properties		Ref
Permanent	Provisional	Named after	Date	Site	Discoverer(s)	Category	Diam.	Ref
873001	2019 BV_{12}	—	January 26, 2019	Mount Lemmon	Mount Lemmon Survey	H	280 m	MPC · JPL
873002	2019 CA	—	July 12, 2016	Haleakala	Pan-STARRS 1	·	820 m	MPC · JPL
873003	2019 CN	—	February 24, 2014	Haleakala	Pan-STARRS 1	H	300 m	MPC · JPL
873004	2019 CH_{7}	—	February 14, 2010	Catalina	CSS	·	1.7 km	MPC · JPL
873005	2019 CD_{8}	—	October 3, 2014	Mount Lemmon	Mount Lemmon Survey	·	560 m	MPC · JPL
873006	2019 CE_{8}	—	April 5, 2016	Haleakala	Pan-STARRS 1	·	420 m	MPC · JPL
873007	2019 CN_{9}	—	November 25, 2005	Mount Lemmon	Mount Lemmon Survey	JUN	810 m	MPC · JPL
873008	2019 CV_{11}	—	February 4, 2019	Haleakala	Pan-STARRS 1	·	1.3 km	MPC · JPL
873009	2019 CG_{12}	—	February 4, 2019	Haleakala	Pan-STARRS 1	·	490 m	MPC · JPL
873010	2019 CY_{13}	—	April 18, 2015	Cerro Tololo	DECam	JUN	790 m	MPC · JPL
873011	2019 CA_{15}	—	February 5, 2019	Calar Alto-CASADO	Hellmich, S., Mottola, S.	·	770 m	MPC · JPL
873012	2019 CD_{15}	—	February 11, 2019	Mount Lemmon	Mount Lemmon Survey	(2076)	650 m	MPC · JPL
873013	2019 CJ_{15}	—	February 5, 2019	Haleakala	Pan-STARRS 1	·	1.1 km	MPC · JPL
873014	2019 CL_{15}	—	February 5, 2019	Haleakala	Pan-STARRS 1	·	1.3 km	MPC · JPL
873015	2019 CP_{15}	—	February 4, 2019	Haleakala	Pan-STARRS 1	H	320 m	MPC · JPL
873016	2019 CQ_{15}	—	February 8, 2019	Mount Lemmon	Mount Lemmon Survey	H	350 m	MPC · JPL
873017	2019 CS_{15}	—	February 9, 2019	Haleakala	Pan-STARRS 2	H	380 m	MPC · JPL
873018	2019 CU_{15}	—	February 8, 2019	Mount Lemmon	Mount Lemmon Survey	H	310 m	MPC · JPL
873019	2019 CH_{16}	—	February 4, 2019	Haleakala	Pan-STARRS 1	·	540 m	MPC · JPL
873020	2019 CV_{16}	—	February 4, 2019	Haleakala	Pan-STARRS 1	·	740 m	MPC · JPL
873021	2019 CN_{17}	—	April 15, 2008	Kitt Peak	Spacewatch	·	860 m	MPC · JPL
873022	2019 CR_{17}	—	February 4, 2019	Haleakala	Pan-STARRS 1	·	1.5 km	MPC · JPL
873023	2019 CS_{17}	—	February 5, 2019	Haleakala	Pan-STARRS 1	·	1.7 km	MPC · JPL
873024	2019 CH_{18}	—	February 4, 2019	Haleakala	Pan-STARRS 1	·	690 m	MPC · JPL
873025	2019 CN_{18}	—	February 4, 2019	Haleakala	Pan-STARRS 1	·	850 m	MPC · JPL
873026	2019 CY_{18}	—	February 5, 2019	Haleakala	Pan-STARRS 1	·	1.2 km	MPC · JPL
873027	2019 CF_{21}	—	January 27, 2015	Haleakala	Pan-STARRS 1	EUN	1.2 km	MPC · JPL
873028	2019 CN_{22}	—	October 27, 2017	Haleakala	Pan-STARRS 1	·	880 m	MPC · JPL
873029	2019 CY_{33}	—	February 9, 2019	Mount Lemmon	Mount Lemmon Survey	H	250 m	MPC · JPL
873030	2019 CA_{34}	—	January 8, 2019	Haleakala	Pan-STARRS 1	·	1.7 km	MPC · JPL
873031	2019 EP	—	January 11, 2014	Mount Lemmon	Mount Lemmon Survey	H	460 m	MPC · JPL
873032	2019 EN_{3}	—	August 2, 2016	Haleakala	Pan-STARRS 1	·	1.7 km	MPC · JPL
873033	2019 EP_{5}	—	March 6, 2019	Mount Lemmon	Mount Lemmon Survey	H	430 m	MPC · JPL
873034	2019 ER_{9}	—	March 15, 2019	Mauna Kea	COIAS	·	630 m	MPC · JPL
873035	2019 FA_{4}	—	April 17, 2015	Kitt Peak	Spacewatch	·	800 m	MPC · JPL
873036	2019 FM_{5}	—	March 31, 2019	Mount Lemmon	Mount Lemmon Survey	·	1.3 km	MPC · JPL
873037	2019 FC_{6}	—	March 28, 2019	Kitt Peak	Spacewatch	T_{j} (2.98)	1.9 km	MPC · JPL
873038	2019 FG_{6}	—	March 29, 2019	Mount Lemmon	Mount Lemmon Survey	H	370 m	MPC · JPL
873039	2019 FB_{7}	—	March 31, 2019	Mount Lemmon	Mount Lemmon Survey	·	1.0 km	MPC · JPL
873040	2019 FR_{7}	—	March 31, 2019	Mount Lemmon	Mount Lemmon Survey	·	1.4 km	MPC · JPL
873041	2019 FP_{8}	—	September 21, 2011	Mount Lemmon	Mount Lemmon Survey	·	1.5 km	MPC · JPL
873042	2019 FK_{10}	—	March 16, 2010	Mount Lemmon	Mount Lemmon Survey	EUN	900 m	MPC · JPL
873043	2019 FQ_{10}	—	January 26, 2014	Haleakala	Pan-STARRS 1	·	1.2 km	MPC · JPL
873044	2019 FE_{14}	—	March 29, 2019	Mount Lemmon	Mount Lemmon Survey	·	1.6 km	MPC · JPL
873045	2019 FU_{14}	—	March 13, 2012	Mount Lemmon	Mount Lemmon Survey	·	500 m	MPC · JPL
873046	2019 FQ_{15}	—	March 31, 2019	Mount Lemmon	Mount Lemmon Survey	·	1.4 km	MPC · JPL
873047	2019 FH_{16}	—	March 29, 2019	Mount Lemmon	Mount Lemmon Survey	·	460 m	MPC · JPL
873048	2019 FP_{16}	—	March 29, 2019	Mount Lemmon	Mount Lemmon Survey	·	1.4 km	MPC · JPL
873049	2019 FZ_{16}	—	March 29, 2019	Mount Lemmon	Mount Lemmon Survey	L5	6.0 km	MPC · JPL
873050	2019 FN_{17}	—	February 6, 2014	Mount Lemmon	Mount Lemmon Survey	·	1.3 km	MPC · JPL
873051	2019 FR_{18}	—	March 29, 2019	Mount Lemmon	Mount Lemmon Survey	·	1.2 km	MPC · JPL
873052	2019 FV_{18}	—	March 29, 2019	Mount Lemmon	Mount Lemmon Survey	L5	6.5 km	MPC · JPL
873053	2019 FX_{18}	—	March 31, 2019	Mount Lemmon	Mount Lemmon Survey	·	1.3 km	MPC · JPL
873054	2019 FF_{19}	—	March 31, 2019	Mount Lemmon	Mount Lemmon Survey	L5	6.4 km	MPC · JPL
873055	2019 FQ_{19}	—	March 29, 2019	Mount Lemmon	Mount Lemmon Survey	·	1.1 km	MPC · JPL
873056	2019 FA_{21}	—	March 29, 2019	Mount Lemmon	Mount Lemmon Survey	·	460 m	MPC · JPL
873057	2019 FF_{21}	—	March 31, 2019	Mount Lemmon	Mount Lemmon Survey	·	490 m	MPC · JPL
873058	2019 FT_{23}	—	March 4, 2006	Kitt Peak	Spacewatch	·	1.0 km	MPC · JPL
873059	2019 FV_{23}	—	May 20, 2015	Cerro Tololo	DECam	·	1.1 km	MPC · JPL
873060	2019 FM_{24}	—	May 23, 2014	Haleakala	Pan-STARRS 1	·	1.7 km	MPC · JPL
873061	2019 FP_{24}	—	March 31, 2019	Mount Lemmon	Mount Lemmon Survey	·	2.0 km	MPC · JPL
873062	2019 FR_{24}	—	May 22, 2015	Cerro Tololo	DECam	·	1.4 km	MPC · JPL
873063	2019 FA_{25}	—	March 29, 2019	Mount Lemmon	Mount Lemmon Survey	·	1.8 km	MPC · JPL
873064	2019 FX_{26}	—	March 31, 2019	Mount Lemmon	Mount Lemmon Survey	·	1.4 km	MPC · JPL
873065	2019 FM_{27}	—	May 23, 2014	Haleakala	Pan-STARRS 1	·	2.1 km	MPC · JPL
873066	2019 FV_{27}	—	April 18, 2015	Cerro Tololo	DECam	HNS	770 m	MPC · JPL
873067	2019 FD_{28}	—	March 29, 2019	Mount Lemmon	Mount Lemmon Survey	·	1.3 km	MPC · JPL
873068	2019 FD_{29}	—	March 31, 2019	Mount Lemmon	Mount Lemmon Survey	·	1.4 km	MPC · JPL
873069	2019 FV_{29}	—	April 19, 2015	Mount Lemmon	Mount Lemmon Survey	·	1.0 km	MPC · JPL
873070	2019 FY_{29}	—	May 22, 2015	Cerro Tololo	DECam	·	1.2 km	MPC · JPL
873071	2019 FJ_{30}	—	March 29, 2019	Kitt Peak	Spacewatch	·	1.3 km	MPC · JPL
873072	2019 FB_{33}	—	March 29, 2019	Kitt Peak	Spacewatch	·	1.3 km	MPC · JPL
873073	2019 FO_{34}	—	August 29, 2016	Mount Lemmon	Mount Lemmon Survey	AGN	920 m	MPC · JPL
873074	2019 GX	—	August 8, 2012	Haleakala	Pan-STARRS 1	H	390 m	MPC · JPL
873075	2019 GD_{10}	—	April 2, 2019	Haleakala	Pan-STARRS 1	L5	5.9 km	MPC · JPL
873076	2019 GK_{12}	—	March 13, 2005	Mount Lemmon	Mount Lemmon Survey	NYS	700 m	MPC · JPL
873077	2019 GT_{12}	—	August 29, 2016	Mount Lemmon	Mount Lemmon Survey	·	2.0 km	MPC · JPL
873078	2019 GW_{13}	—	October 24, 2013	Mount Lemmon	Mount Lemmon Survey	L5	5.7 km	MPC · JPL
873079	2019 GR_{15}	—	February 14, 2005	Kitt Peak	Spacewatch	·	460 m	MPC · JPL
873080	2019 GJ_{16}	—	April 5, 2019	Haleakala	Pan-STARRS 1	·	1.3 km	MPC · JPL
873081	2019 GD_{22}	—	March 30, 2015	Haleakala	Pan-STARRS 1	(5)	900 m	MPC · JPL
873082	2019 GX_{22}	—	September 25, 2012	Mount Lemmon	Mount Lemmon Survey	L5	5.7 km	MPC · JPL
873083	2019 GS_{23}	—	April 2, 2019	Haleakala	Pan-STARRS 1	·	1.2 km	MPC · JPL
873084	2019 GA_{28}	—	April 2, 2019	Haleakala	Pan-STARRS 1	·	920 m	MPC · JPL
873085	2019 GJ_{29}	—	April 4, 2019	Haleakala	Pan-STARRS 1	·	920 m	MPC · JPL
873086	2019 GT_{30}	—	April 2, 2019	Haleakala	Pan-STARRS 1	GAL	1.4 km	MPC · JPL
873087	2019 GZ_{32}	—	April 3, 2019	Haleakala	Pan-STARRS 1	BRA	1.1 km	MPC · JPL
873088	2019 GA_{33}	—	April 4, 2019	Haleakala	Pan-STARRS 1	H	370 m	MPC · JPL
873089	2019 GG_{34}	—	August 2, 2016	Haleakala	Pan-STARRS 1	·	1.4 km	MPC · JPL
873090	2019 GY_{34}	—	January 21, 2014	Kitt Peak	Spacewatch	·	1.1 km	MPC · JPL
873091	2019 GE_{40}	—	September 3, 2013	Haleakala	Pan-STARRS 1	·	510 m	MPC · JPL
873092	2019 GH_{40}	—	April 3, 2019	Haleakala	Pan-STARRS 1	·	1.0 km	MPC · JPL
873093	2019 GG_{44}	—	January 22, 2002	Kitt Peak	Spacewatch	·	720 m	MPC · JPL
873094	2019 GH_{44}	—	April 5, 2019	Haleakala	Pan-STARRS 1	MAR	800 m	MPC · JPL
873095	2019 GW_{50}	—	May 21, 2015	Haleakala	Pan-STARRS 1	·	1.1 km	MPC · JPL
873096	2019 GC_{51}	—	April 6, 2019	Haleakala	Pan-STARRS 1	EUN	810 m	MPC · JPL
873097	2019 GW_{52}	—	April 5, 2019	Haleakala	Pan-STARRS 1	·	1.4 km	MPC · JPL
873098	2019 GG_{53}	—	April 3, 2019	Haleakala	Pan-STARRS 1	·	1.3 km	MPC · JPL
873099	2019 GH_{53}	—	April 3, 2019	Haleakala	Pan-STARRS 1	AGN	680 m	MPC · JPL
873100	2019 GJ_{53}	—	April 2, 2019	Haleakala	Pan-STARRS 1	MRX	770 m	MPC · JPL

== 873101–873200 ==
back to top

Designation			Discovery			Properties		Ref
Permanent	Provisional	Named after	Date	Site	Discoverer(s)	Category	Diam.	Ref
873101	2019 GC_{54}	—	April 28, 2014	Cerro Tololo	DECam	·	1.5 km	MPC · JPL
873102	2019 GP_{54}	—	April 4, 2019	Haleakala	Pan-STARRS 1	·	2.2 km	MPC · JPL
873103	2019 GN_{55}	—	April 2, 2019	Haleakala	Pan-STARRS 1	·	1.3 km	MPC · JPL
873104	2019 GR_{55}	—	May 23, 2014	Haleakala	Pan-STARRS 1	EOS	1.4 km	MPC · JPL
873105	2019 GT_{55}	—	April 3, 2019	Haleakala	Pan-STARRS 1	·	1.8 km	MPC · JPL
873106	2019 GB_{56}	—	April 8, 2019	Haleakala	Pan-STARRS 1	·	1.3 km	MPC · JPL
873107	2019 GC_{57}	—	April 8, 2019	Haleakala	Pan-STARRS 1	·	810 m	MPC · JPL
873108	2019 GD_{57}	—	April 5, 2019	Haleakala	Pan-STARRS 1	L5	6.2 km	MPC · JPL
873109	2019 GE_{57}	—	April 3, 2019	Haleakala	Pan-STARRS 1	·	1.5 km	MPC · JPL
873110	2019 GF_{57}	—	April 3, 2019	Haleakala	Pan-STARRS 1	·	1.2 km	MPC · JPL
873111	2019 GG_{57}	—	April 3, 2019	Haleakala	Pan-STARRS 1	·	1.4 km	MPC · JPL
873112	2019 GW_{57}	—	April 3, 2019	Haleakala	Pan-STARRS 1	·	1.3 km	MPC · JPL
873113	2019 GZ_{57}	—	April 6, 2019	Haleakala	Pan-STARRS 1	·	1.8 km	MPC · JPL
873114	2019 GF_{58}	—	April 2, 2019	Haleakala	Pan-STARRS 1	L5	7.1 km	MPC · JPL
873115	2019 GT_{58}	—	April 5, 2019	Haleakala	Pan-STARRS 1	L5	6.7 km	MPC · JPL
873116	2019 GA_{59}	—	April 8, 2019	Haleakala	Pan-STARRS 1	L5	7.2 km	MPC · JPL
873117	2019 GE_{59}	—	April 3, 2019	Haleakala	Pan-STARRS 1	·	1.3 km	MPC · JPL
873118	2019 GM_{59}	—	April 3, 2019	Haleakala	Pan-STARRS 1	L5	6.4 km	MPC · JPL
873119	2019 GO_{60}	—	April 2, 2019	Haleakala	Pan-STARRS 1	·	1.2 km	MPC · JPL
873120	2019 GX_{62}	—	April 5, 2019	Haleakala	Pan-STARRS 1	·	1.4 km	MPC · JPL
873121	2019 GQ_{63}	—	May 8, 2014	Haleakala	Pan-STARRS 1	·	1.4 km	MPC · JPL
873122	2019 GD_{64}	—	April 3, 2019	Haleakala	Pan-STARRS 1	·	1.5 km	MPC · JPL
873123	2019 GP_{64}	—	April 18, 2015	Cerro Tololo	DECam	·	1.1 km	MPC · JPL
873124	2019 GQ_{64}	—	April 5, 2019	Haleakala	Pan-STARRS 1	·	1.5 km	MPC · JPL
873125	2019 GR_{64}	—	April 5, 2019	Haleakala	Pan-STARRS 1	·	1.4 km	MPC · JPL
873126	2019 GO_{65}	—	April 3, 2019	Haleakala	Pan-STARRS 1	·	1.2 km	MPC · JPL
873127	2019 GD_{66}	—	April 5, 2019	Haleakala	Pan-STARRS 1	·	1.3 km	MPC · JPL
873128	2019 GB_{67}	—	April 10, 2019	Haleakala	Pan-STARRS 1	AGN	800 m	MPC · JPL
873129	2019 GM_{67}	—	April 4, 2019	Haleakala	Pan-STARRS 1	NEM	1.5 km	MPC · JPL
873130	2019 GY_{68}	—	April 2, 2019	Haleakala	Pan-STARRS 1	·	1.4 km	MPC · JPL
873131	2019 GC_{69}	—	April 3, 2019	Haleakala	Pan-STARRS 1	·	470 m	MPC · JPL
873132	2019 GA_{71}	—	April 3, 2019	Haleakala	Pan-STARRS 1	·	940 m	MPC · JPL
873133	2019 GQ_{72}	—	April 5, 2019	Haleakala	Pan-STARRS 1	·	990 m	MPC · JPL
873134	2019 GX_{72}	—	April 24, 2014	Mount Lemmon	Mount Lemmon Survey	·	980 m	MPC · JPL
873135	2019 GY_{72}	—	April 3, 2019	Haleakala	Pan-STARRS 1	·	980 m	MPC · JPL
873136	2019 GE_{73}	—	April 2, 2019	Haleakala	Pan-STARRS 1	·	1.2 km	MPC · JPL
873137	2019 GP_{73}	—	April 5, 2019	Haleakala	Pan-STARRS 1	V	420 m	MPC · JPL
873138	2019 GG_{80}	—	April 7, 2019	Haleakala	Pan-STARRS 1	L5	6.4 km	MPC · JPL
873139	2019 GW_{80}	—	April 3, 2019	Haleakala	Pan-STARRS 1	·	530 m	MPC · JPL
873140	2019 GA_{81}	—	April 13, 2019	Mount Lemmon	Mount Lemmon Survey	·	1.4 km	MPC · JPL
873141	2019 GX_{82}	—	April 5, 2019	Haleakala	Pan-STARRS 1	·	1.6 km	MPC · JPL
873142	2019 GG_{83}	—	April 8, 2019	Haleakala	Pan-STARRS 1	EUN	800 m	MPC · JPL
873143	2019 GT_{84}	—	April 11, 2019	Mount Lemmon	Mount Lemmon Survey	H	340 m	MPC · JPL
873144	2019 GD_{86}	—	April 5, 2014	Haleakala	Pan-STARRS 1	H	380 m	MPC · JPL
873145	2019 GT_{89}	—	April 2, 2019	Haleakala	Pan-STARRS 1	H	340 m	MPC · JPL
873146	2019 GY_{91}	—	April 5, 2019	Haleakala	Pan-STARRS 1	·	1.3 km	MPC · JPL
873147	2019 GP_{93}	—	April 4, 2019	Haleakala	Pan-STARRS 1	URS	2.2 km	MPC · JPL
873148	2019 GR_{93}	—	April 5, 2019	Haleakala	Pan-STARRS 1	·	2.2 km	MPC · JPL
873149	2019 GO_{97}	—	April 19, 2015	Mount Lemmon	Mount Lemmon Survey	·	660 m	MPC · JPL
873150	2019 GR_{97}	—	April 9, 2019	Haleakala	Pan-STARRS 1	GEF	840 m	MPC · JPL
873151	2019 GU_{97}	—	April 4, 2019	Haleakala	Pan-STARRS 1	·	1.3 km	MPC · JPL
873152	2019 GF_{98}	—	April 4, 2019	Haleakala	Pan-STARRS 1	V	360 m	MPC · JPL
873153	2019 GN_{98}	—	April 6, 2019	Haleakala	Pan-STARRS 1	·	1.4 km	MPC · JPL
873154	2019 GU_{100}	—	April 3, 2019	Haleakala	Pan-STARRS 1	·	1.2 km	MPC · JPL
873155	2019 GS_{103}	—	February 12, 2018	Haleakala	Pan-STARRS 1	L5	5.7 km	MPC · JPL
873156	2019 GJ_{108}	—	April 2, 2019	Haleakala	Pan-STARRS 1	L5	6.6 km	MPC · JPL
873157	2019 GU_{108}	—	September 17, 2012	Mount Lemmon	Mount Lemmon Survey	L5	6.6 km	MPC · JPL
873158	2019 GP_{109}	—	April 10, 2019	Mount Lemmon	Mount Lemmon Survey	H	400 m	MPC · JPL
873159	2019 GF_{110}	—	May 24, 2015	Haleakala	Pan-STARRS 1	·	830 m	MPC · JPL
873160	2019 GF_{111}	—	April 7, 2019	Mount Lemmon	Mount Lemmon Survey	·	1.6 km	MPC · JPL
873161	2019 GJ_{111}	—	November 2, 2016	Mount Lemmon	Mount Lemmon Survey	·	1.6 km	MPC · JPL
873162	2019 GX_{111}	—	April 5, 2019	Haleakala	Pan-STARRS 1	L5	5.7 km	MPC · JPL
873163	2019 GC_{112}	—	April 5, 2019	Haleakala	Pan-STARRS 1	·	470 m	MPC · JPL
873164	2019 GS_{112}	—	April 2, 2019	Haleakala	Pan-STARRS 1	L5	6.6 km	MPC · JPL
873165	2019 GN_{113}	—	April 5, 2019	Haleakala	Pan-STARRS 1	·	2.0 km	MPC · JPL
873166	2019 GP_{113}	—	April 3, 2019	Haleakala	Pan-STARRS 1	·	900 m	MPC · JPL
873167	2019 GJ_{114}	—	April 3, 2019	Haleakala	Pan-STARRS 1	L5	6.1 km	MPC · JPL
873168	2019 GD_{119}	—	February 16, 2013	Mount Lemmon	Mount Lemmon Survey	·	1.8 km	MPC · JPL
873169	2019 GD_{120}	—	August 8, 2016	Haleakala	Pan-STARRS 1	KOR	1 km	MPC · JPL
873170	2019 GL_{121}	—	April 6, 2019	Haleakala	Pan-STARRS 1	·	1.2 km	MPC · JPL
873171	2019 GO_{121}	—	April 2, 2019	Haleakala	Pan-STARRS 1	·	1.4 km	MPC · JPL
873172	2019 GS_{121}	—	February 21, 2006	Catalina	CSS	·	1.1 km	MPC · JPL
873173	2019 GB_{123}	—	September 4, 2010	Mount Lemmon	Mount Lemmon Survey	·	1.8 km	MPC · JPL
873174	2019 GE_{123}	—	October 15, 2017	Mount Lemmon	Mount Lemmon Survey	(5)	780 m	MPC · JPL
873175	2019 GV_{125}	—	April 3, 2019	Haleakala	Pan-STARRS 1	·	1.3 km	MPC · JPL
873176	2019 GK_{126}	—	April 5, 2019	Haleakala	Pan-STARRS 1	H	330 m	MPC · JPL
873177	2019 GE_{127}	—	September 10, 2016	Mount Lemmon	Mount Lemmon Survey	·	1.1 km	MPC · JPL
873178	2019 GO_{127}	—	April 4, 2019	Haleakala	Pan-STARRS 1	·	1.4 km	MPC · JPL
873179	2019 GB_{128}	—	April 6, 2019	Haleakala	Pan-STARRS 1	·	1.3 km	MPC · JPL
873180	2019 GC_{128}	—	May 21, 2015	Haleakala	Pan-STARRS 1	·	1.5 km	MPC · JPL
873181	2019 GP_{128}	—	May 21, 2015	Haleakala	Pan-STARRS 1	·	1.1 km	MPC · JPL
873182	2019 GA_{129}	—	January 17, 2015	Haleakala	Pan-STARRS 1	·	880 m	MPC · JPL
873183	2019 GD_{131}	—	April 2, 2019	Haleakala	Pan-STARRS 1	·	1.3 km	MPC · JPL
873184	2019 GB_{132}	—	April 3, 2019	Haleakala	Pan-STARRS 1	·	440 m	MPC · JPL
873185	2019 GZ_{134}	—	April 7, 2019	Mount Lemmon	Mount Lemmon Survey	·	1.4 km	MPC · JPL
873186	2019 GE_{136}	—	February 14, 2013	Haleakala	Pan-STARRS 1	H	390 m	MPC · JPL
873187	2019 GB_{137}	—	April 3, 2019	Haleakala	Pan-STARRS 1	·	430 m	MPC · JPL
873188	2019 GD_{151}	—	April 7, 2019	Haleakala	Pan-STARRS 1	HOF	1.7 km	MPC · JPL
873189	2019 GU_{152}	—	April 2, 2019	Haleakala	Pan-STARRS 1	·	1.6 km	MPC · JPL
873190	2019 GN_{163}	—	April 2, 2019	Haleakala	Pan-STARRS 1	·	1.3 km	MPC · JPL
873191	2019 GA_{172}	—	April 5, 2019	Haleakala	Pan-STARRS 1	L5	6.7 km	MPC · JPL
873192	2019 GS_{172}	—	April 2, 2019	Haleakala	Pan-STARRS 1	L5	7.1 km	MPC · JPL
873193	2019 GC_{173}	—	April 2, 2019	Haleakala	Pan-STARRS 1	·	1.5 km	MPC · JPL
873194	2019 GM_{175}	—	April 5, 2019	Haleakala	Pan-STARRS 1	·	1.3 km	MPC · JPL
873195	2019 GY_{177}	—	April 5, 2019	Haleakala	Pan-STARRS 1	L5	6.2 km	MPC · JPL
873196	2019 GC_{180}	—	April 8, 2019	Haleakala	Pan-STARRS 1	H	330 m	MPC · JPL
873197	2019 GN_{181}	—	March 13, 2013	Mount Lemmon	Mount Lemmon Survey	THM	1.6 km	MPC · JPL
873198	2019 GE_{184}	—	April 2, 2019	Haleakala	Pan-STARRS 1	·	1.3 km	MPC · JPL
873199	2019 GR_{195}	—	November 4, 2013	Mount Lemmon	Mount Lemmon Survey	L5	7.1 km	MPC · JPL
873200	2019 HW_{1}	—	March 5, 2008	Mount Lemmon	Mount Lemmon Survey	·	650 m	MPC · JPL

== 873201–873300 ==
back to top

Designation			Discovery			Properties		Ref
Permanent	Provisional	Named after	Date	Site	Discoverer(s)	Category	Diam.	Ref
873201	2019 HH_{2}	—	July 15, 2013	Haleakala	Pan-STARRS 1	·	480 m	MPC · JPL
873202	2019 HE_{3}	—	April 27, 2019	Mount Lemmon	Mount Lemmon Survey	H	390 m	MPC · JPL
873203	2019 HD_{4}	—	November 28, 2010	Mount Lemmon	Mount Lemmon Survey	H	320 m	MPC · JPL
873204	2019 HH_{4}	—	April 25, 2019	Haleakala	Pan-STARRS 1	APO · PHA	380 m	MPC · JPL
873205	2019 HJ_{5}	—	April 26, 2019	Mount Lemmon	Mount Lemmon Survey	·	1.4 km	MPC · JPL
873206	2019 HJ_{8}	—	April 26, 2019	Mount Lemmon	Mount Lemmon Survey	·	520 m	MPC · JPL
873207	2019 HK_{8}	—	April 27, 2019	Kitt Peak	Spacewatch	AGN	850 m	MPC · JPL
873208	2019 HY_{8}	—	April 26, 2019	Mount Lemmon	Mount Lemmon Survey	·	1.4 km	MPC · JPL
873209	2019 HB_{9}	—	April 24, 2019	Haleakala	Pan-STARRS 1	·	1.3 km	MPC · JPL
873210	2019 HC_{11}	—	April 24, 2019	Haleakala	Pan-STARRS 1	L5	5.9 km	MPC · JPL
873211	2019 HU_{11}	—	October 28, 2017	Haleakala	Pan-STARRS 1	·	400 m	MPC · JPL
873212	2019 HD_{12}	—	May 20, 2015	Cerro Tololo	DECam	·	1.2 km	MPC · JPL
873213	2019 HY_{12}	—	April 24, 2019	Haleakala	Pan-STARRS 1	HOF	1.6 km	MPC · JPL
873214	2019 HM_{13}	—	April 24, 2019	Haleakala	Pan-STARRS 1	L5	6.4 km	MPC · JPL
873215	2019 JJ_{2}	—	September 22, 2017	Haleakala	Pan-STARRS 1	H	370 m	MPC · JPL
873216	2019 JD_{3}	—	October 10, 2012	Mount Lemmon	Mount Lemmon Survey	H	280 m	MPC · JPL
873217	2019 JK_{4}	—	September 22, 2017	Haleakala	Pan-STARRS 1	H	350 m	MPC · JPL
873218	2019 JE_{8}	—	February 10, 2016	Haleakala	Pan-STARRS 1	H	400 m	MPC · JPL
873219	2019 JG_{8}	—	June 22, 2006	Palomar	NEAT	·	1.6 km	MPC · JPL
873220	2019 JK_{8}	—	January 28, 2015	Haleakala	Pan-STARRS 1	·	1.0 km	MPC · JPL
873221	2019 JC_{12}	—	October 10, 2004	Kitt Peak	Deep Ecliptic Survey	(5)	890 m	MPC · JPL
873222	2019 JH_{13}	—	September 24, 2017	Haleakala	Pan-STARRS 1	H	340 m	MPC · JPL
873223	2019 JD_{15}	—	October 5, 2013	Haleakala	Pan-STARRS 1	·	460 m	MPC · JPL
873224	2019 JB_{16}	—	December 23, 2017	Haleakala	Pan-STARRS 1	AGN	920 m	MPC · JPL
873225	2019 JN_{18}	—	May 28, 2008	Mount Lemmon	Mount Lemmon Survey	·	2.1 km	MPC · JPL
873226	2019 JH_{24}	—	March 12, 2007	Mount Lemmon	Mount Lemmon Survey	·	1.8 km	MPC · JPL
873227	2019 JT_{24}	—	October 15, 2007	Mount Lemmon	Mount Lemmon Survey	·	1.4 km	MPC · JPL
873228	2019 JO_{25}	—	February 3, 2009	Kitt Peak	Spacewatch	AGN	810 m	MPC · JPL
873229	2019 JS_{25}	—	July 19, 2015	Haleakala	Pan-STARRS 1	·	1.4 km	MPC · JPL
873230	2019 JY_{25}	—	February 26, 2014	Mount Lemmon	Mount Lemmon Survey	·	1.2 km	MPC · JPL
873231	2019 JE_{26}	—	April 3, 2019	Haleakala	Pan-STARRS 1	·	1.1 km	MPC · JPL
873232	2019 JK_{27}	—	October 7, 2016	Haleakala	Pan-STARRS 1	·	1.8 km	MPC · JPL
873233	2019 JP_{36}	—	May 5, 2014	Mount Lemmon	Mount Lemmon Survey	·	1.4 km	MPC · JPL
873234	2019 JC_{44}	—	June 30, 2014	Mount Lemmon	Mount Lemmon Survey	·	1.2 km	MPC · JPL
873235	2019 JL_{44}	—	August 24, 2001	Kitt Peak	Spacewatch	·	1.2 km	MPC · JPL
873236	2019 JS_{46}	—	March 19, 2013	Haleakala	Pan-STARRS 1	THM	1.3 km	MPC · JPL
873237	2019 JN_{47}	—	May 12, 2019	Haleakala	Pan-STARRS 1	·	2.0 km	MPC · JPL
873238	2019 JS_{48}	—	May 2, 2019	Haleakala	Pan-STARRS 1	JUN	780 m	MPC · JPL
873239	2019 JF_{49}	—	May 1, 2019	Haleakala	Pan-STARRS 1	MAS	560 m	MPC · JPL
873240	2019 JZ_{49}	—	May 1, 2019	Mount Lemmon	Mount Lemmon Survey	PHO	630 m	MPC · JPL
873241	2019 JT_{51}	—	May 2, 2019	Mount Lemmon	Mount Lemmon Survey	·	1.3 km	MPC · JPL
873242	2019 JP_{54}	—	October 7, 2007	Mount Lemmon	Mount Lemmon Survey	·	1.2 km	MPC · JPL
873243	2019 JW_{55}	—	May 1, 2019	Haleakala	Pan-STARRS 1	MAR	660 m	MPC · JPL
873244	2019 JM_{57}	—	May 2, 2019	Mount Lemmon	Mount Lemmon Survey	·	1.2 km	MPC · JPL
873245	2019 JV_{58}	—	May 1, 2019	Haleakala	Pan-STARRS 1	·	1.3 km	MPC · JPL
873246	2019 JX_{60}	—	May 1, 2019	Haleakala	Pan-STARRS 1	·	920 m	MPC · JPL
873247	2019 JJ_{63}	—	May 1, 2019	Haleakala	Pan-STARRS 1	·	1.5 km	MPC · JPL
873248	2019 JR_{63}	—	May 1, 2019	Haleakala	Pan-STARRS 1	·	1.4 km	MPC · JPL
873249	2019 JC_{64}	—	April 21, 2015	Cerro Tololo	DECam	·	960 m	MPC · JPL
873250	2019 JY_{64}	—	May 9, 2019	Haleakala	Pan-STARRS 1	·	1.2 km	MPC · JPL
873251	2019 JB_{65}	—	May 1, 2019	Haleakala	Pan-STARRS 1	·	1.6 km	MPC · JPL
873252	2019 JW_{65}	—	May 9, 2019	Mount Lemmon	Mount Lemmon Survey	H	370 m	MPC · JPL
873253	2019 JC_{66}	—	May 1, 2019	Haleakala	Pan-STARRS 1	AGN	870 m	MPC · JPL
873254	2019 JE_{66}	—	May 1, 2019	Haleakala	Pan-STARRS 1	·	450 m	MPC · JPL
873255	2019 JN_{66}	—	May 1, 2019	Haleakala	Pan-STARRS 1	·	1.5 km	MPC · JPL
873256	2019 JL_{67}	—	May 1, 2019	Haleakala	Pan-STARRS 1	·	480 m	MPC · JPL
873257	2019 JJ_{70}	—	May 23, 2014	Haleakala	Pan-STARRS 1	·	1.4 km	MPC · JPL
873258	2019 JV_{70}	—	May 1, 2019	Haleakala	Pan-STARRS 1	·	1.5 km	MPC · JPL
873259	2019 JX_{70}	—	April 23, 2014	Cerro Tololo	DECam	KOR	890 m	MPC · JPL
873260	2019 JA_{71}	—	May 7, 2019	Haleakala	Pan-STARRS 1	EOS	1.2 km	MPC · JPL
873261	2019 JL_{73}	—	May 2, 2019	Haleakala	Pan-STARRS 1	·	2.2 km	MPC · JPL
873262	2019 JQ_{73}	—	May 8, 2019	Haleakala	Pan-STARRS 1	·	630 m	MPC · JPL
873263	2019 JD_{74}	—	May 1, 2019	Haleakala	Pan-STARRS 1	·	1.6 km	MPC · JPL
873264	2019 JY_{74}	—	May 2, 2019	Haleakala	Pan-STARRS 1	TIR	1.8 km	MPC · JPL
873265	2019 JA_{76}	—	May 11, 2019	Haleakala	Pan-STARRS 1	·	2.1 km	MPC · JPL
873266	2019 JD_{76}	—	April 23, 2014	Cerro Tololo	DECam	KOR	860 m	MPC · JPL
873267	2019 JO_{76}	—	May 8, 2019	Haleakala	Pan-STARRS 1	·	2.3 km	MPC · JPL
873268	2019 JZ_{78}	—	May 1, 2019	Haleakala	Pan-STARRS 1	·	1.1 km	MPC · JPL
873269	2019 JC_{80}	—	May 8, 2019	Haleakala	Pan-STARRS 1	·	1.8 km	MPC · JPL
873270	2019 JA_{81}	—	May 2, 2019	Haleakala	Pan-STARRS 1	·	890 m	MPC · JPL
873271	2019 JP_{81}	—	May 1, 2019	Haleakala	Pan-STARRS 1	·	1.3 km	MPC · JPL
873272	2019 JE_{82}	—	May 8, 2019	Haleakala	Pan-STARRS 1	·	1.6 km	MPC · JPL
873273	2019 JV_{82}	—	May 21, 2015	Cerro Tololo	DECam	·	760 m	MPC · JPL
873274	2019 JX_{82}	—	May 8, 2019	Haleakala	Pan-STARRS 1	·	1.3 km	MPC · JPL
873275	2019 JD_{83}	—	May 1, 2019	Haleakala	Pan-STARRS 1	KOR	960 m	MPC · JPL
873276	2019 JD_{84}	—	May 5, 2019	Cerro Tololo-DECam	DECam	·	860 m	MPC · JPL
873277	2019 JA_{85}	—	May 1, 2019	Haleakala	Pan-STARRS 1	EOS	1.2 km	MPC · JPL
873278	2019 JT_{85}	—	May 12, 2019	Haleakala	Pan-STARRS 1	·	2.6 km	MPC · JPL
873279	2019 JL_{87}	—	May 1, 2019	Haleakala	Pan-STARRS 1	·	860 m	MPC · JPL
873280	2019 JM_{94}	—	January 23, 2015	Haleakala	Pan-STARRS 1	·	460 m	MPC · JPL
873281	2019 JL_{97}	—	March 19, 2013	Haleakala	Pan-STARRS 1	·	1.7 km	MPC · JPL
873282	2019 JX_{101}	—	May 1, 2019	Haleakala	Pan-STARRS 1	·	1.3 km	MPC · JPL
873283	2019 JJ_{103}	—	May 11, 2019	Haleakala	Pan-STARRS 1	·	1.3 km	MPC · JPL
873284	2019 JJ_{104}	—	May 1, 2019	Haleakala	Pan-STARRS 1	·	1.5 km	MPC · JPL
873285	2019 JK_{104}	—	May 1, 2019	Haleakala	Pan-STARRS 1	·	390 m	MPC · JPL
873286	2019 JR_{108}	—	May 8, 2019	Haleakala	Pan-STARRS 1	·	1.4 km	MPC · JPL
873287	2019 JK_{117}	—	May 7, 2019	Haleakala	Pan-STARRS 1	·	1.2 km	MPC · JPL
873288	2019 JH_{147}	—	May 8, 2019	Mauna Kea	COIAS	·	560 m	MPC · JPL
873289	2019 JL_{149}	—	May 8, 2019	Haleakala	Pan-STARRS 1	·	1.4 km	MPC · JPL
873290	2019 JR_{149}	—	November 23, 2011	Mount Lemmon	Mount Lemmon Survey	·	1.3 km	MPC · JPL
873291	2019 KL_{3}	—	November 8, 2013	Kitt Peak	Spacewatch	L5	6.5 km	MPC · JPL
873292	2019 KK_{7}	—	May 29, 2019	Haleakala	Pan-STARRS 1	·	1.7 km	MPC · JPL
873293	2019 KG_{8}	—	September 16, 2009	Kitt Peak	Spacewatch	·	1.4 km	MPC · JPL
873294	2019 KS_{8}	—	May 26, 2019	Haleakala	Pan-STARRS 1	·	1.3 km	MPC · JPL
873295	2019 KP_{9}	—	June 24, 2014	Mount Lemmon	Mount Lemmon Survey	·	1.2 km	MPC · JPL
873296	2019 KV_{9}	—	May 26, 2019	Haleakala	Pan-STARRS 1	·	880 m	MPC · JPL
873297	2019 KZ_{9}	—	May 30, 2019	Haleakala	Pan-STARRS 1	·	2.1 km	MPC · JPL
873298	2019 KG_{12}	—	May 30, 2019	Haleakala	Pan-STARRS 1	·	1.4 km	MPC · JPL
873299	2019 KQ_{15}	—	August 16, 2009	Kitt Peak	Spacewatch	·	520 m	MPC · JPL
873300	2019 KW_{15}	—	May 27, 2019	Haleakala	Pan-STARRS 1	EOS	1.3 km	MPC · JPL

== 873301–873400 ==
back to top

Designation			Discovery			Properties		Ref
Permanent	Provisional	Named after	Date	Site	Discoverer(s)	Category	Diam.	Ref
873301	2019 KK_{16}	—	May 27, 2019	Haleakala	Pan-STARRS 1	MAS	550 m	MPC · JPL
873302	2019 KV_{16}	—	May 21, 2014	Haleakala	Pan-STARRS 1	·	1.3 km	MPC · JPL
873303	2019 KS_{21}	—	May 30, 2019	Haleakala	Pan-STARRS 1	·	1.1 km	MPC · JPL
873304	2019 KE_{23}	—	May 30, 2019	Haleakala	Pan-STARRS 1	EOS	1.2 km	MPC · JPL
873305	2019 KQ_{23}	—	October 28, 2005	Mount Lemmon	Mount Lemmon Survey	·	1.3 km	MPC · JPL
873306	2019 KF_{24}	—	May 26, 2019	Haleakala	Pan-STARRS 1	·	1.4 km	MPC · JPL
873307	2019 KJ_{25}	—	May 28, 2019	Mount Lemmon	Mount Lemmon Survey	·	1.5 km	MPC · JPL
873308	2019 KA_{26}	—	May 30, 2019	Haleakala	Pan-STARRS 1	VER	2.0 km	MPC · JPL
873309	2019 KB_{26}	—	May 25, 2019	Haleakala	Pan-STARRS 1	·	1.2 km	MPC · JPL
873310	2019 KJ_{27}	—	May 27, 2019	Haleakala	Pan-STARRS 1	EOS	1.2 km	MPC · JPL
873311	2019 KE_{28}	—	May 29, 2019	Haleakala	Pan-STARRS 1	·	1.2 km	MPC · JPL
873312	2019 KN_{31}	—	December 15, 2017	Mount Lemmon	Mount Lemmon Survey	·	1.1 km	MPC · JPL
873313	2019 KL_{33}	—	May 27, 2019	Haleakala	Pan-STARRS 1	·	1.7 km	MPC · JPL
873314	2019 KR_{33}	—	May 31, 2019	Haleakala	Pan-STARRS 1	·	1.2 km	MPC · JPL
873315	2019 KU_{34}	—	May 29, 2019	Haleakala	Pan-STARRS 1	·	1.9 km	MPC · JPL
873316	2019 KX_{35}	—	May 26, 2019	Haleakala	Pan-STARRS 1	H	370 m	MPC · JPL
873317	2019 KH_{36}	—	May 27, 2019	Haleakala	Pan-STARRS 1	·	920 m	MPC · JPL
873318	2019 KV_{36}	—	April 23, 2014	Cerro Tololo	DECam	AGN	880 m	MPC · JPL
873319	2019 KN_{38}	—	April 28, 2014	Cerro Tololo	DECam	·	1.3 km	MPC · JPL
873320	2019 KU_{41}	—	May 26, 2019	Haleakala	Pan-STARRS 1	·	2.1 km	MPC · JPL
873321	2019 KC_{42}	—	May 30, 2019	Haleakala	Pan-STARRS 1	·	2.1 km	MPC · JPL
873322	2019 KA_{44}	—	May 29, 2019	Haleakala	Pan-STARRS 1	·	1.3 km	MPC · JPL
873323	2019 KW_{46}	—	May 30, 2019	Haleakala	Pan-STARRS 1	·	510 m	MPC · JPL
873324	2019 KQ_{54}	—	July 27, 2014	Haleakala	Pan-STARRS 1	·	2.0 km	MPC · JPL
873325	2019 KJ_{57}	—	January 17, 2013	Haleakala	Pan-STARRS 1	AGN	820 m	MPC · JPL
873326	2019 KN_{57}	—	August 24, 2007	Kitt Peak	Spacewatch	·	880 m	MPC · JPL
873327	2019 LG_{3}	—	October 2, 2017	Mount Lemmon	Mount Lemmon Survey	·	410 m	MPC · JPL
873328	2019 LZ_{3}	—	November 9, 2007	Kitt Peak	Spacewatch	H	270 m	MPC · JPL
873329	2019 LR_{7}	—	September 6, 2014	Mount Lemmon	Mount Lemmon Survey	·	2.2 km	MPC · JPL
873330	2019 LZ_{7}	—	June 9, 2019	Haleakala	Pan-STARRS 1	·	2.2 km	MPC · JPL
873331	2019 LM_{8}	—	June 1, 2019	Haleakala	Pan-STARRS 1	T_{j} (2.99)	2.1 km	MPC · JPL
873332	2019 LH_{10}	—	June 3, 2019	Haleakala	Pan-STARRS 1	·	1.1 km	MPC · JPL
873333	2019 LZ_{10}	—	June 3, 2019	Mount Lemmon	Mount Lemmon Survey	·	1.4 km	MPC · JPL
873334	2019 LS_{15}	—	May 18, 2015	Haleakala	Pan-STARRS 1	·	750 m	MPC · JPL
873335	2019 LU_{15}	—	June 9, 2019	Haleakala	Pan-STARRS 1	·	1.9 km	MPC · JPL
873336	2019 LV_{15}	—	June 11, 2019	Haleakala	Pan-STARRS 1	·	2.5 km	MPC · JPL
873337	2019 LG_{16}	—	June 9, 2019	Haleakala	Pan-STARRS 1	·	2.1 km	MPC · JPL
873338	2019 LJ_{16}	—	June 2, 2019	Haleakala	Pan-STARRS 1	·	1.0 km	MPC · JPL
873339	2019 LV_{16}	—	June 5, 2018	Haleakala	Pan-STARRS 1	·	2.2 km	MPC · JPL
873340	2019 LZ_{16}	—	July 5, 2014	Haleakala	Pan-STARRS 1	TIR	2.3 km	MPC · JPL
873341	2019 LJ_{19}	—	June 2, 2019	Haleakala	Pan-STARRS 1	·	1.5 km	MPC · JPL
873342	2019 LV_{19}	—	June 10, 2019	Haleakala	Pan-STARRS 2	·	3.4 km	MPC · JPL
873343	2019 LB_{20}	—	June 4, 2019	Palomar Mountain	Zwicky Transient Facility	·	1.3 km	MPC · JPL
873344	2019 LD_{20}	—	June 2, 2019	Haleakala	Pan-STARRS 1	·	1.1 km	MPC · JPL
873345	2019 LF_{20}	—	June 1, 2019	Haleakala	Pan-STARRS 1	·	1.2 km	MPC · JPL
873346	2019 LN_{20}	—	June 9, 2019	Haleakala	Pan-STARRS 1	·	1.6 km	MPC · JPL
873347	2019 LQ_{20}	—	June 1, 2019	Haleakala	Pan-STARRS 1	·	1.1 km	MPC · JPL
873348	2019 LU_{20}	—	June 9, 2019	Haleakala	Pan-STARRS 1	ELF	2.8 km	MPC · JPL
873349	2019 LO_{21}	—	April 28, 2014	Cerro Tololo	DECam	MAR	690 m	MPC · JPL
873350	2019 LQ_{21}	—	June 9, 2019	Haleakala	Pan-STARRS 1	·	1.9 km	MPC · JPL
873351	2019 LU_{21}	—	June 1, 2019	Haleakala	Pan-STARRS 1	RAF	700 m	MPC · JPL
873352	2019 LV_{22}	—	June 2, 2019	Haleakala	Pan-STARRS 1	·	1.2 km	MPC · JPL
873353	2019 LY_{22}	—	June 1, 2019	Haleakala	Pan-STARRS 2	·	1.4 km	MPC · JPL
873354	2019 LZ_{22}	—	June 11, 2019	Palomar Mountain	Zwicky Transient Facility	EUP	2.0 km	MPC · JPL
873355	2019 LB_{23}	—	May 20, 2014	Haleakala	Pan-STARRS 1	·	1.3 km	MPC · JPL
873356	2019 LR_{24}	—	June 3, 2019	Haleakala	Pan-STARRS 1	·	1.2 km	MPC · JPL
873357	2019 LZ_{24}	—	June 12, 2019	Haleakala	Pan-STARRS 1	·	740 m	MPC · JPL
873358	2019 LU_{29}	—	June 6, 2019	Mount Lemmon	Mount Lemmon Survey	·	1.9 km	MPC · JPL
873359	2019 LN_{30}	—	June 11, 2019	Mount Lemmon	Mount Lemmon Survey	·	1.0 km	MPC · JPL
873360	2019 LU_{34}	—	June 9, 2019	Haleakala	Pan-STARRS 1	·	780 m	MPC · JPL
873361	2019 LH_{35}	—	June 7, 2019	Haleakala	Pan-STARRS 1	·	950 m	MPC · JPL
873362	2019 LP_{40}	—	June 2, 2019	Haleakala	Pan-STARRS 1	·	1.2 km	MPC · JPL
873363	2019 MD	—	August 29, 2005	Kitt Peak	Spacewatch	·	880 m	MPC · JPL
873364	2019 MM_{7}	—	June 28, 2019	Haleakala	Pan-STARRS 1	·	2.0 km	MPC · JPL
873365	2019 MC_{9}	—	June 30, 2019	Haleakala	Pan-STARRS 1	BRA	1.1 km	MPC · JPL
873366	2019 MU_{10}	—	August 27, 2014	Haleakala	Pan-STARRS 1	·	1.9 km	MPC · JPL
873367	2019 MD_{12}	—	June 30, 2019	Haleakala	Pan-STARRS 1	·	1.8 km	MPC · JPL
873368	2019 MF_{12}	—	June 30, 2019	Haleakala	Pan-STARRS 1	·	470 m	MPC · JPL
873369	2019 MA_{17}	—	June 22, 2019	Haleakala	Pan-STARRS 1	·	860 m	MPC · JPL
873370	2019 MT_{17}	—	June 30, 2019	Haleakala	Pan-STARRS 1	·	2.4 km	MPC · JPL
873371	2019 MZ_{17}	—	June 28, 2019	Haleakala	Pan-STARRS 1	THM	1.6 km	MPC · JPL
873372	2019 MB_{18}	—	June 30, 2019	Haleakala	Pan-STARRS 1	·	2.2 km	MPC · JPL
873373	2019 MJ_{18}	—	June 28, 2019	Haleakala	Pan-STARRS 1	BRA	1.3 km	MPC · JPL
873374	2019 MO_{19}	—	December 5, 2015	Haleakala	Pan-STARRS 1	·	2.2 km	MPC · JPL
873375	2019 MC_{20}	—	June 28, 2019	Palomar Mountain	Zwicky Transient Facility	·	2.1 km	MPC · JPL
873376	2019 MU_{20}	—	June 30, 2019	Haleakala	Pan-STARRS 1	·	1.9 km	MPC · JPL
873377	2019 MN_{21}	—	June 30, 2019	Haleakala	Pan-STARRS 1	·	1.8 km	MPC · JPL
873378	2019 MT_{21}	—	June 30, 2019	Haleakala	Pan-STARRS 1	·	2.1 km	MPC · JPL
873379	2019 MU_{21}	—	June 28, 2019	Haleakala	Pan-STARRS 1	·	1.2 km	MPC · JPL
873380	2019 MQ_{24}	—	July 25, 2015	Haleakala	Pan-STARRS 1	·	1.2 km	MPC · JPL
873381	2019 MW_{24}	—	June 28, 2019	Haleakala	Pan-STARRS 1	·	1.7 km	MPC · JPL
873382	2019 MX_{24}	—	June 29, 2019	Haleakala	Pan-STARRS 1	·	1.8 km	MPC · JPL
873383	2019 MA_{25}	—	September 10, 2016	Mount Lemmon	Mount Lemmon Survey	·	670 m	MPC · JPL
873384	2019 MH_{25}	—	June 28, 2019	Haleakala	Pan-STARRS 1	·	540 m	MPC · JPL
873385	2019 MV_{25}	—	July 25, 2014	Haleakala	Pan-STARRS 1	·	1.7 km	MPC · JPL
873386	2019 MO_{27}	—	April 10, 2015	Mount Lemmon	Mount Lemmon Survey	L4	5.8 km	MPC · JPL
873387	2019 MP_{31}	—	August 23, 2014	Haleakala	Pan-STARRS 1	·	2.1 km	MPC · JPL
873388	2019 MS_{31}	—	July 25, 2015	Haleakala	Pan-STARRS 1	(18466)	1.6 km	MPC · JPL
873389	2019 MJ_{34}	—	June 28, 2019	Haleakala	Pan-STARRS 1	·	1.9 km	MPC · JPL
873390	2019 MW_{37}	—	July 25, 2014	Haleakala	Pan-STARRS 1	EOS	1.1 km	MPC · JPL
873391	2019 NA_{1}	—	November 21, 2014	Haleakala	Pan-STARRS 1	L5	7.5 km	MPC · JPL
873392	2019 NP_{2}	—	May 30, 2019	Haleakala	Pan-STARRS 1	·	1.0 km	MPC · JPL
873393	2019 ND_{6}	—	January 24, 2012	Haleakala	Pan-STARRS 1	L4	6.6 km	MPC · JPL
873394	2019 NH_{7}	—	November 18, 2014	Haleakala	Pan-STARRS 1	·	2.9 km	MPC · JPL
873395	2019 NO_{9}	—	September 2, 2014	Haleakala	Pan-STARRS 1	(21885)	1.9 km	MPC · JPL
873396	2019 NA_{14}	—	June 19, 2015	Haleakala	Pan-STARRS 1	V	390 m	MPC · JPL
873397	2019 NF_{14}	—	May 25, 2015	Haleakala	Pan-STARRS 1	·	1.0 km	MPC · JPL
873398	2019 NL_{14}	—	July 1, 2019	Haleakala	Pan-STARRS 1	·	2.2 km	MPC · JPL
873399	2019 NH_{19}	—	August 28, 2002	Palomar Mountain	NEAT	·	1.9 km	MPC · JPL
873400	2019 NW_{19}	—	July 1, 2019	Haleakala	Pan-STARRS 1	·	940 m	MPC · JPL

== 873401–873500 ==
back to top

Designation			Discovery			Properties		Ref
Permanent	Provisional	Named after	Date	Site	Discoverer(s)	Category	Diam.	Ref
873401	2019 NR_{21}	—	November 12, 2015	Mount Lemmon	Mount Lemmon Survey	·	1.2 km	MPC · JPL
873402	2019 NS_{21}	—	September 14, 2002	Haleakala	NEAT	·	2.2 km	MPC · JPL
873403	2019 NP_{22}	—	September 13, 2013	Mount Lemmon	Mount Lemmon Survey	·	2.3 km	MPC · JPL
873404	2019 NH_{23}	—	August 16, 2002	Palomar	NEAT	·	2.2 km	MPC · JPL
873405	2019 NP_{24}	—	July 3, 2019	Mount Lemmon	Mount Lemmon Survey	·	2.3 km	MPC · JPL
873406	2019 NC_{25}	—	April 21, 2015	Kitt Peak	Spacewatch	·	710 m	MPC · JPL
873407	2019 NF_{25}	—	July 10, 2019	Haleakala	Pan-STARRS 1	PHO	820 m	MPC · JPL
873408	2019 NU_{28}	—	July 1, 2019	Haleakala	Pan-STARRS 1	·	2.0 km	MPC · JPL
873409	2019 NH_{30}	—	January 7, 2010	Mount Lemmon	Mount Lemmon Survey	·	1.9 km	MPC · JPL
873410	2019 NJ_{31}	—	June 3, 2019	Mount Lemmon	Mount Lemmon Survey	·	2.4 km	MPC · JPL
873411	2019 NO_{32}	—	July 4, 2019	Haleakala	Pan-STARRS 1	·	2.2 km	MPC · JPL
873412	2019 ND_{33}	—	November 1, 2014	Kitt Peak	Spacewatch	·	1.8 km	MPC · JPL
873413	2019 NL_{33}	—	July 7, 2019	Haleakala	Pan-STARRS 1	·	2.2 km	MPC · JPL
873414	2019 NW_{35}	—	July 7, 2019	Haleakala	Pan-STARRS 1	·	830 m	MPC · JPL
873415	2019 NL_{36}	—	August 7, 2008	Kitt Peak	Spacewatch	·	2.1 km	MPC · JPL
873416	2019 NA_{37}	—	July 3, 2019	Haleakala	Pan-STARRS 1	·	500 m	MPC · JPL
873417	2019 NT_{37}	—	July 4, 2019	Haleakala	Pan-STARRS 1	·	1.8 km	MPC · JPL
873418	2019 NS_{38}	—	July 5, 2019	Haleakala	Pan-STARRS 2	·	2.3 km	MPC · JPL
873419	2019 NV_{39}	—	July 1, 2019	Haleakala	Pan-STARRS 1	EOS	1.4 km	MPC · JPL
873420	2019 NV_{40}	—	July 7, 2019	Haleakala	Pan-STARRS 1	·	890 m	MPC · JPL
873421	2019 NN_{41}	—	July 14, 2019	Haleakala	Pan-STARRS 1	GAL	930 m	MPC · JPL
873422	2019 NG_{42}	—	July 1, 2019	Haleakala	Pan-STARRS 1	VER	1.9 km	MPC · JPL
873423	2019 NH_{44}	—	October 25, 2014	Mount Lemmon	Mount Lemmon Survey	·	1.5 km	MPC · JPL
873424	2019 ND_{46}	—	July 11, 2019	Palomar Mountain	Zwicky Transient Facility	T_{j} (2.98)	2.1 km	MPC · JPL
873425	2019 NQ_{46}	—	August 22, 2014	Haleakala	Pan-STARRS 1	·	1.8 km	MPC · JPL
873426	2019 NB_{47}	—	December 12, 2014	Haleakala	Pan-STARRS 1	·	2.3 km	MPC · JPL
873427	2019 NL_{47}	—	November 26, 2014	Mount Lemmon	Mount Lemmon Survey	·	1.5 km	MPC · JPL
873428	2019 NN_{48}	—	July 3, 2019	Mount Lemmon	Mount Lemmon Survey	·	2.1 km	MPC · JPL
873429	2019 NJ_{51}	—	July 4, 2019	Haleakala	Pan-STARRS 1	L4	6.0 km	MPC · JPL
873430	2019 NO_{51}	—	July 7, 2019	Haleakala	Pan-STARRS 1	L4	6.0 km	MPC · JPL
873431	2019 NZ_{51}	—	July 6, 2019	Haleakala	Pan-STARRS 1	·	2.1 km	MPC · JPL
873432	2019 NC_{52}	—	July 3, 2019	Haleakala	Pan-STARRS 1	EOS	1.4 km	MPC · JPL
873433	2019 NN_{52}	—	July 6, 2019	Haleakala	Pan-STARRS 1	·	2.2 km	MPC · JPL
873434	2019 NS_{52}	—	July 5, 2019	Haleakala	Pan-STARRS 2	L4	5.3 km	MPC · JPL
873435	2019 NV_{52}	—	July 2, 2019	Haleakala	Pan-STARRS 1	·	2.2 km	MPC · JPL
873436	2019 NW_{52}	—	June 29, 2019	Haleakala	Pan-STARRS 1	·	990 m	MPC · JPL
873437	2019 NA_{53}	—	July 6, 2019	Haleakala	Pan-STARRS 1	·	2.2 km	MPC · JPL
873438	2019 NB_{53}	—	July 6, 2019	Haleakala	Pan-STARRS 1	·	2.0 km	MPC · JPL
873439	2019 NH_{53}	—	July 2, 2019	Haleakala	Pan-STARRS 1	·	2.0 km	MPC · JPL
873440	2019 NP_{53}	—	July 7, 2019	Haleakala	Pan-STARRS 1	·	1.3 km	MPC · JPL
873441	2019 NQ_{53}	—	July 7, 2019	Haleakala	Pan-STARRS 1	KOR	990 m	MPC · JPL
873442	2019 NJ_{54}	—	July 1, 2019	Haleakala	Pan-STARRS 1	(5)	850 m	MPC · JPL
873443	2019 NV_{54}	—	July 4, 2019	Haleakala	Pan-STARRS 1	EOS	1.4 km	MPC · JPL
873444	2019 NZ_{54}	—	July 3, 2019	Haleakala	Pan-STARRS 1	·	1.9 km	MPC · JPL
873445	2019 NK_{55}	—	July 4, 2019	Haleakala	Pan-STARRS 1	·	2.7 km	MPC · JPL
873446	2019 NN_{58}	—	July 10, 2019	Haleakala	Pan-STARRS 1	L4	5.5 km	MPC · JPL
873447	2019 NQ_{58}	—	July 1, 2019	Haleakala	Pan-STARRS 1	L4	5.8 km	MPC · JPL
873448	2019 NG_{59}	—	July 1, 2019	Haleakala	Pan-STARRS 1	·	1.5 km	MPC · JPL
873449	2019 NC_{60}	—	July 7, 2019	Haleakala	Pan-STARRS 1	·	970 m	MPC · JPL
873450	2019 NL_{64}	—	July 1, 2019	Haleakala	Pan-STARRS 1	·	2.0 km	MPC · JPL
873451	2019 NX_{64}	—	July 4, 2019	Haleakala	Pan-STARRS 1	·	1.4 km	MPC · JPL
873452	2019 NM_{70}	—	July 2, 2019	Haleakala	Pan-STARRS 1	·	1.9 km	MPC · JPL
873453	2019 NS_{71}	—	July 1, 2019	Haleakala	Pan-STARRS 1	L4	5.3 km	MPC · JPL
873454	2019 NK_{81}	—	July 2, 2019	Haleakala	Pan-STARRS 1	H	490 m	MPC · JPL
873455	2019 NT_{81}	—	July 3, 2019	Cerro Tololo-DECam	DECam	·	1.3 km	MPC · JPL
873456	2019 NR_{83}	—	August 23, 2014	Haleakala	Pan-STARRS 1	·	1.7 km	MPC · JPL
873457	2019 NS_{85}	—	July 4, 2019	Haleakala	Pan-STARRS 2	·	850 m	MPC · JPL
873458	2019 NS_{88}	—	July 1, 2019	Haleakala	Pan-STARRS 1	L4	5.7 km	MPC · JPL
873459	2019 NL_{92}	—	August 28, 2014	Haleakala	Pan-STARRS 1	·	1.9 km	MPC · JPL
873460	2019 NC_{94}	—	March 28, 2003	Kitt Peak	Spacewatch	·	1.4 km	MPC · JPL
873461	2019 NQ_{103}	—	July 6, 2019	Haleakala	Pan-STARRS 1	·	2.2 km	MPC · JPL
873462	2019 NA_{108}	—	January 8, 2010	WISE	WISE	·	510 m	MPC · JPL
873463	2019 NL_{109}	—	July 2, 2019	Haleakala	Pan-STARRS 1	·	2.0 km	MPC · JPL
873464	2019 NW_{113}	—	July 1, 2019	Haleakala	Pan-STARRS 1	·	2.2 km	MPC · JPL
873465	2019 NC_{122}	—	July 1, 2019	Haleakala	Pan-STARRS 1	·	2.1 km	MPC · JPL
873466	2019 NX_{122}	—	August 23, 2014	Haleakala	Pan-STARRS 1	·	2.0 km	MPC · JPL
873467	2019 ND_{123}	—	August 27, 2014	Haleakala	Pan-STARRS 1	·	1.7 km	MPC · JPL
873468	2019 OS_{3}	—	April 6, 2019	Haleakala	Pan-STARRS 1	T_{j} (2.94)	2.1 km	MPC · JPL
873469	2019 OU_{7}	—	July 1, 2019	Haleakala	Pan-STARRS 1	·	1.0 km	MPC · JPL
873470	2019 OH_{10}	—	September 19, 2014	Haleakala	Pan-STARRS 1	·	1.9 km	MPC · JPL
873471	2019 OJ_{10}	—	October 24, 2009	Kitt Peak	Spacewatch	·	1.8 km	MPC · JPL
873472	2019 OH_{13}	—	August 29, 2002	Palomar	NEAT	THM	1.7 km	MPC · JPL
873473	2019 OO_{13}	—	October 8, 2012	Mount Lemmon	Mount Lemmon Survey	·	800 m	MPC · JPL
873474	2019 OO_{14}	—	July 27, 2019	Haleakala	Pan-STARRS 2	·	1.7 km	MPC · JPL
873475	2019 OZ_{14}	—	July 28, 2019	Haleakala	Pan-STARRS 2	·	2.2 km	MPC · JPL
873476	2019 OJ_{15}	—	November 10, 2016	Haleakala	Pan-STARRS 1	PHO	850 m	MPC · JPL
873477	2019 OU_{15}	—	October 20, 2008	Kitt Peak	Spacewatch	·	1.0 km	MPC · JPL
873478	2019 OM_{17}	—	November 24, 2014	Haleakala	Pan-STARRS 1	·	2.3 km	MPC · JPL
873479	2019 OJ_{20}	—	August 29, 2006	Kitt Peak	Spacewatch	EUN	950 m	MPC · JPL
873480	2019 OC_{21}	—	July 28, 2019	Haleakala	Pan-STARRS 2	·	2.2 km	MPC · JPL
873481	2019 OD_{22}	—	November 4, 2016	Haleakala	Pan-STARRS 1	·	460 m	MPC · JPL
873482	2019 OU_{22}	—	August 19, 2014	Haleakala	Pan-STARRS 1	·	1.9 km	MPC · JPL
873483	2019 OD_{23}	—	December 9, 2015	Haleakala	Pan-STARRS 1	JUN	690 m	MPC · JPL
873484	2019 OH_{23}	—	July 28, 2019	Haleakala	Pan-STARRS 1	EOS	1.4 km	MPC · JPL
873485	2019 OK_{24}	—	July 4, 2019	Mount Lemmon	Mount Lemmon Survey	·	550 m	MPC · JPL
873486	2019 OJ_{25}	—	August 28, 2014	Haleakala	Pan-STARRS 1	·	2.0 km	MPC · JPL
873487	2019 OV_{25}	—	January 24, 2015	Haleakala	Pan-STARRS 1	·	1.9 km	MPC · JPL
873488	2019 OA_{28}	—	July 28, 2019	Haleakala	Pan-STARRS 1	·	2.3 km	MPC · JPL
873489	2019 OJ_{28}	—	July 25, 2019	Haleakala	Pan-STARRS 1	·	1.3 km	MPC · JPL
873490	2019 OK_{28}	—	July 26, 2019	Haleakala	Pan-STARRS 1	·	1.2 km	MPC · JPL
873491	2019 OX_{28}	—	July 28, 2019	Haleakala	Pan-STARRS 1	·	2.0 km	MPC · JPL
873492	2019 OM_{29}	—	July 28, 2019	Haleakala	Pan-STARRS 1	·	2.1 km	MPC · JPL
873493	2019 OB_{33}	—	July 30, 2019	Haleakala	Pan-STARRS 1	·	2.1 km	MPC · JPL
873494	2019 OM_{33}	—	July 25, 2019	Haleakala	Pan-STARRS 1	·	940 m	MPC · JPL
873495	2019 OU_{33}	—	July 28, 2019	Haleakala	Pan-STARRS 1	·	2.5 km	MPC · JPL
873496	2019 OW_{36}	—	August 30, 2014	Mount Lemmon	Mount Lemmon Survey	·	2.0 km	MPC · JPL
873497	2019 OK_{37}	—	July 28, 2019	Haleakala	Pan-STARRS 1	·	780 m	MPC · JPL
873498	2019 OX_{38}	—	July 29, 2019	Haleakala	Pan-STARRS 1	·	2.0 km	MPC · JPL
873499	2019 OM_{39}	—	April 18, 2015	Cerro Tololo	DECam	L4	5.3 km	MPC · JPL
873500	2019 OE_{40}	—	July 25, 2019	Haleakala	Pan-STARRS 1	·	2.0 km	MPC · JPL

== 873501–873600 ==
back to top

Designation			Discovery			Properties		Ref
Permanent	Provisional	Named after	Date	Site	Discoverer(s)	Category	Diam.	Ref
873501	2019 OF_{40}	—	July 25, 2019	Haleakala	Pan-STARRS 1	·	2.3 km	MPC · JPL
873502	2019 OD_{41}	—	July 29, 2019	Haleakala	Pan-STARRS 1	PHO	710 m	MPC · JPL
873503	2019 OX_{42}	—	January 20, 2018	Haleakala	Pan-STARRS 1	V	430 m	MPC · JPL
873504	2019 OY_{44}	—	July 30, 2019	Haleakala	Pan-STARRS 2	·	2.1 km	MPC · JPL
873505	2019 OH_{50}	—	July 25, 2019	Haleakala	Pan-STARRS 1	AGN	820 m	MPC · JPL
873506	2019 PK_{4}	—	January 29, 2011	Mount Lemmon	Mount Lemmon Survey	EOS	1.1 km	MPC · JPL
873507	2019 PH_{5}	—	September 4, 2010	Mount Lemmon	Mount Lemmon Survey	·	1.2 km	MPC · JPL
873508	2019 PB_{7}	—	August 8, 2019	Haleakala	Pan-STARRS 2	VER	1.7 km	MPC · JPL
873509	2019 PC_{7}	—	May 26, 2014	Haleakala	Pan-STARRS 1	·	1.2 km	MPC · JPL
873510	2019 PT_{10}	—	January 26, 2017	Haleakala	Pan-STARRS 1	·	1.4 km	MPC · JPL
873511	2019 PS_{11}	—	October 6, 2005	Mount Lemmon	Mount Lemmon Survey	KOR	890 m	MPC · JPL
873512	2019 PG_{12}	—	September 3, 2008	Kitt Peak	Spacewatch	·	2.1 km	MPC · JPL
873513	2019 PM_{12}	—	September 5, 1996	Kitt Peak	Spacewatch	·	2.0 km	MPC · JPL
873514	2019 PA_{13}	—	August 26, 2013	Haleakala	Pan-STARRS 1	THB	2.5 km	MPC · JPL
873515	2019 PD_{13}	—	August 4, 2019	Haleakala	Pan-STARRS 1	·	850 m	MPC · JPL
873516	2019 PQ_{13}	—	August 8, 2019	Haleakala	Pan-STARRS 1	·	760 m	MPC · JPL
873517	2019 PU_{13}	—	June 30, 2013	Haleakala	Pan-STARRS 1	·	2.0 km	MPC · JPL
873518	2019 PW_{17}	—	September 21, 2011	Mount Lemmon	Mount Lemmon Survey	H	430 m	MPC · JPL
873519	2019 PW_{18}	—	August 11, 2019	Haleakala	Pan-STARRS 1	·	2.1 km	MPC · JPL
873520	2019 PM_{19}	—	August 29, 2002	Palomar	NEAT	·	2.2 km	MPC · JPL
873521	2019 PX_{19}	—	October 8, 2008	Mount Lemmon	Mount Lemmon Survey	·	2.2 km	MPC · JPL
873522	2019 PJ_{22}	—	July 5, 2013	Siding Spring	SSS	THB	2.2 km	MPC · JPL
873523	2019 PM_{23}	—	January 17, 2015	Haleakala	Pan-STARRS 1	·	2.6 km	MPC · JPL
873524	2019 PO_{25}	—	July 23, 2015	Haleakala	Pan-STARRS 1	·	1 km	MPC · JPL
873525	2019 PS_{26}	—	September 23, 2008	Mount Lemmon	Mount Lemmon Survey	·	2.0 km	MPC · JPL
873526	2019 PW_{26}	—	August 14, 2006	Palomar	NEAT	·	1.4 km	MPC · JPL
873527	2019 PR_{29}	—	July 30, 2005	Palomar	NEAT	·	1.4 km	MPC · JPL
873528	2019 PJ_{31}	—	August 12, 2019	Haleakala	Pan-STARRS 1	·	1.4 km	MPC · JPL
873529	2019 PW_{32}	—	August 8, 2019	Haleakala	Pan-STARRS 2	V	480 m	MPC · JPL
873530	2019 PU_{33}	—	March 12, 2016	Haleakala	Pan-STARRS 1	·	1.9 km	MPC · JPL
873531	2019 PY_{33}	—	June 11, 2015	Haleakala	Pan-STARRS 1	·	540 m	MPC · JPL
873532	2019 PQ_{34}	—	August 7, 2019	Haleakala	Pan-STARRS 2	·	1.9 km	MPC · JPL
873533	2019 PY_{34}	—	April 23, 2014	Cerro Tololo	DECam	·	650 m	MPC · JPL
873534	2019 PO_{35}	—	August 8, 2019	Haleakala	Pan-STARRS 1	·	1.6 km	MPC · JPL
873535	2019 PB_{36}	—	August 4, 2019	Haleakala	Pan-STARRS 1	·	2.5 km	MPC · JPL
873536	2019 PE_{36}	—	April 23, 2014	Cerro Tololo	DECam	·	690 m	MPC · JPL
873537	2019 PH_{36}	—	August 5, 2019	Haleakala	Pan-STARRS 1	·	1.8 km	MPC · JPL
873538	2019 PS_{36}	—	August 8, 2019	Haleakala	Pan-STARRS 2	·	1.5 km	MPC · JPL
873539	2019 PT_{36}	—	August 9, 2019	Haleakala	Pan-STARRS 1	EOS	1.4 km	MPC · JPL
873540	2019 PW_{44}	—	August 8, 2019	Haleakala	Pan-STARRS 1	·	2.2 km	MPC · JPL
873541	2019 PK_{45}	—	August 9, 2019	Haleakala	Pan-STARRS 1	·	2.0 km	MPC · JPL
873542	2019 PN_{45}	—	August 12, 2019	Haleakala	Pan-STARRS 1	PHO	900 m	MPC · JPL
873543	2019 PT_{45}	—	August 8, 2019	Haleakala	Pan-STARRS 1	·	1.8 km	MPC · JPL
873544	2019 PX_{45}	—	April 3, 2016	Haleakala	Pan-STARRS 1	T_{j} (2.99)	2.1 km	MPC · JPL
873545	2019 PR_{46}	—	August 11, 2019	Haleakala	Pan-STARRS 1	·	400 m	MPC · JPL
873546	2019 PM_{47}	—	August 8, 2019	Haleakala	Pan-STARRS 1	EOS	1.3 km	MPC · JPL
873547	2019 PC_{52}	—	August 8, 2019	Haleakala	Pan-STARRS 1	·	500 m	MPC · JPL
873548	2019 PK_{59}	—	August 5, 2019	Haleakala	Pan-STARRS 1	·	1.9 km	MPC · JPL
873549	2019 PC_{64}	—	August 8, 2019	Haleakala	Pan-STARRS 1	EOS	1.1 km	MPC · JPL
873550	2019 PZ_{64}	—	May 25, 2015	Mount Lemmon	Mount Lemmon Survey	(2076)	510 m	MPC · JPL
873551	2019 PS_{65}	—	August 5, 2019	Haleakala	Pan-STARRS 1	·	650 m	MPC · JPL
873552	2019 PA_{70}	—	January 3, 2016	Haleakala	Pan-STARRS 1	·	2.5 km	MPC · JPL
873553	2019 PQ_{75}	—	August 8, 2019	Haleakala	Pan-STARRS 1	·	2.1 km	MPC · JPL
873554	2019 PA_{79}	—	August 8, 2019	Haleakala	Pan-STARRS 1	·	2.0 km	MPC · JPL
873555	2019 PE_{87}	—	August 8, 2019	Haleakala	Pan-STARRS 2	·	840 m	MPC · JPL
873556	2019 QJ_{13}	—	September 15, 2010	Catalina	CSS	·	1.4 km	MPC · JPL
873557	2019 QL_{13}	—	August 27, 2019	Mount Lemmon	Mount Lemmon Survey	EUN	820 m	MPC · JPL
873558	2019 QE_{15}	—	August 31, 2019	Haleakala	Pan-STARRS 1	·	1.3 km	MPC · JPL
873559	2019 QG_{15}	—	September 18, 2003	Kitt Peak	Spacewatch	·	1.9 km	MPC · JPL
873560	2019 QT_{16}	—	August 24, 2019	Haleakala	Pan-STARRS 1	·	910 m	MPC · JPL
873561	2019 QS_{17}	—	April 30, 2014	Haleakala	Pan-STARRS 1	·	1.2 km	MPC · JPL
873562	2019 QV_{17}	—	August 24, 2019	Haleakala	Pan-STARRS 1	T_{j} (2.96)	2.6 km	MPC · JPL
873563	2019 QG_{18}	—	March 18, 2018	Haleakala	Pan-STARRS 1	H	360 m	MPC · JPL
873564	2019 QN_{19}	—	April 23, 2014	Cerro Tololo	DECam	·	740 m	MPC · JPL
873565	2019 QX_{19}	—	August 9, 2015	Haleakala	Pan-STARRS 1	·	810 m	MPC · JPL
873566	2019 QL_{20}	—	September 14, 2013	Haleakala	Pan-STARRS 1	·	2.4 km	MPC · JPL
873567	2019 QQ_{20}	—	October 10, 2012	Haleakala	Pan-STARRS 1	·	930 m	MPC · JPL
873568	2019 QX_{21}	—	September 9, 2015	Haleakala	Pan-STARRS 1	·	1.0 km	MPC · JPL
873569	2019 QQ_{24}	—	September 19, 2012	Mount Lemmon	Mount Lemmon Survey	·	610 m	MPC · JPL
873570	2019 QM_{26}	—	November 12, 2007	Mount Lemmon	Mount Lemmon Survey	·	1.2 km	MPC · JPL
873571	2019 QP_{26}	—	May 23, 2014	Haleakala	Pan-STARRS 1	·	1.1 km	MPC · JPL
873572	2019 QW_{26}	—	February 4, 2006	Kitt Peak	Spacewatch	·	1.4 km	MPC · JPL
873573	2019 QG_{28}	—	August 26, 2019	Mount Lemmon	Mount Lemmon Survey	H	270 m	MPC · JPL
873574	2019 QT_{28}	—	October 20, 2008	Kitt Peak	Spacewatch	·	2.4 km	MPC · JPL
873575	2019 QP_{29}	—	October 10, 2016	Mount Lemmon	Mount Lemmon Survey	·	790 m	MPC · JPL
873576	2019 QZ_{30}	—	August 21, 2019	Haleakala	Pan-STARRS 1	·	2.1 km	MPC · JPL
873577	2019 QJ_{31}	—	August 26, 2019	Haleakala	Pan-STARRS 2	·	1.5 km	MPC · JPL
873578	2019 QR_{31}	—	August 31, 2019	Haleakala	Pan-STARRS 1	·	1.6 km	MPC · JPL
873579	2019 QU_{31}	—	April 28, 2014	Cerro Tololo	DECam	·	970 m	MPC · JPL
873580	2019 QR_{32}	—	August 26, 2019	Haleakala	Pan-STARRS 2	·	1.2 km	MPC · JPL
873581	2019 QV_{32}	—	August 26, 2019	Haleakala	Pan-STARRS 2	EOS	1.1 km	MPC · JPL
873582	2019 QP_{34}	—	September 21, 2012	Mount Lemmon	Mount Lemmon Survey	·	850 m	MPC · JPL
873583	2019 QH_{35}	—	August 25, 2019	Haleakala	Pan-STARRS 2	·	1.5 km	MPC · JPL
873584	2019 QR_{46}	—	July 13, 2013	Haleakala	Pan-STARRS 1	·	1.9 km	MPC · JPL
873585	2019 QA_{48}	—	September 23, 2008	Mount Lemmon	Mount Lemmon Survey	·	2.0 km	MPC · JPL
873586	2019 QQ_{53}	—	August 21, 2019	Haleakala	Pan-STARRS 1	KOR	1 km	MPC · JPL
873587	2019 QQ_{54}	—	August 31, 2019	Haleakala	Pan-STARRS 1	·	1.3 km	MPC · JPL
873588	2019 QP_{65}	—	August 31, 2019	Haleakala	Pan-STARRS 1	·	2.2 km	MPC · JPL
873589	2019 QB_{66}	—	August 31, 2019	Haleakala	Pan-STARRS 1	·	1.9 km	MPC · JPL
873590	2019 QM_{74}	—	August 23, 2019	Haleakala	Pan-STARRS 1	·	510 m	MPC · JPL
873591	2019 QR_{79}	—	March 28, 2016	Cerro Tololo	DECam	·	2.7 km	MPC · JPL
873592	2019 QB_{120}	—	November 26, 2014	Mount Lemmon	Mount Lemmon Survey	·	2.3 km	MPC · JPL
873593	2019 RT_{1}	—	October 5, 2014	Haleakala	Pan-STARRS 1	H	360 m	MPC · JPL
873594	2019 RW_{4}	—	July 28, 2015	Haleakala	Pan-STARRS 1	·	810 m	MPC · JPL
873595	2019 RC_{6}	—	October 20, 2008	Kitt Peak	Spacewatch	THM	1.6 km	MPC · JPL
873596	2019 RJ_{7}	—	September 19, 2012	Mount Lemmon	Mount Lemmon Survey	·	820 m	MPC · JPL
873597	2019 RT_{7}	—	September 14, 2013	Haleakala	Pan-STARRS 1	·	2.2 km	MPC · JPL
873598	2019 RC_{8}	—	July 8, 2015	Kitt Peak	Spacewatch	MAS	510 m	MPC · JPL
873599	2019 RU_{8}	—	September 4, 2019	Mount Lemmon	Mount Lemmon Survey	LIX	3.1 km	MPC · JPL
873600	2019 RD_{9}	—	September 4, 2019	Haleakala	Pan-STARRS 1	LUT	2.8 km	MPC · JPL

== 873601–873700 ==
back to top

Designation			Discovery			Properties		Ref
Permanent	Provisional	Named after	Date	Site	Discoverer(s)	Category	Diam.	Ref
873601	2019 RS_{9}	—	September 1, 2019	Mount Lemmon	Mount Lemmon Survey	·	1.2 km	MPC · JPL
873602	2019 RY_{10}	—	September 6, 2008	Mount Lemmon	Mount Lemmon Survey	·	2.1 km	MPC · JPL
873603	2019 RU_{11}	—	August 12, 2013	Haleakala	Pan-STARRS 1	·	2.4 km	MPC · JPL
873604	2019 RQ_{18}	—	September 5, 2019	Mount Lemmon	Mount Lemmon Survey	·	2.6 km	MPC · JPL
873605	2019 RJ_{28}	—	September 5, 2019	Mount Lemmon	Mount Lemmon Survey	·	2.4 km	MPC · JPL
873606	2019 RL_{29}	—	September 7, 2019	Mount Lemmon	Mount Lemmon Survey	·	710 m	MPC · JPL
873607	2019 RS_{29}	—	September 3, 2019	Mount Lemmon	Mount Lemmon Survey	·	870 m	MPC · JPL
873608	2019 RZ_{29}	—	September 4, 2019	Mount Lemmon	Mount Lemmon Survey	·	2.1 km	MPC · JPL
873609	2019 RH_{30}	—	September 5, 2019	Mount Lemmon	Mount Lemmon Survey	PHO	610 m	MPC · JPL
873610	2019 RQ_{30}	—	April 18, 2015	Cerro Tololo	DECam	·	450 m	MPC · JPL
873611	2019 RB_{31}	—	September 10, 2019	Haleakala	Pan-STARRS 1	·	2.2 km	MPC · JPL
873612	2019 RM_{31}	—	September 5, 2019	Mount Lemmon	Mount Lemmon Survey	·	840 m	MPC · JPL
873613	2019 RB_{32}	—	September 4, 2019	Mount Lemmon	Mount Lemmon Survey	·	2.3 km	MPC · JPL
873614	2019 RC_{32}	—	September 5, 2019	Mount Lemmon	Mount Lemmon Survey	·	2.0 km	MPC · JPL
873615	2019 RP_{32}	—	September 7, 2019	Mount Lemmon	Mount Lemmon Survey	H	360 m	MPC · JPL
873616	2019 RP_{33}	—	September 6, 2019	Haleakala	Pan-STARRS 1	·	720 m	MPC · JPL
873617	2019 RH_{35}	—	September 5, 2019	Mount Lemmon	Mount Lemmon Survey	·	2.3 km	MPC · JPL
873618	2019 RK_{35}	—	August 15, 2013	Haleakala	Pan-STARRS 1	·	2.1 km	MPC · JPL
873619	2019 RV_{35}	—	March 25, 2012	Mount Lemmon	Mount Lemmon Survey	·	1.7 km	MPC · JPL
873620	2019 RQ_{37}	—	September 4, 2019	Mount Lemmon	Mount Lemmon Survey	·	710 m	MPC · JPL
873621	2019 RX_{65}	—	September 5, 2019	Mount Lemmon	Mount Lemmon Survey	EOS	1.3 km	MPC · JPL
873622	2019 RZ_{73}	—	September 4, 2019	Mount Lemmon	Mount Lemmon Survey	·	1.5 km	MPC · JPL
873623	2019 RU_{82}	—	February 10, 2011	Mount Lemmon	Mount Lemmon Survey	·	1.7 km	MPC · JPL
873624	2019 RA_{94}	—	September 6, 2019	Haleakala	Pan-STARRS 1	VER	2.0 km	MPC · JPL
873625	2019 RW_{97}	—	November 17, 2014	Mount Lemmon	Mount Lemmon Survey	(1118)	2.6 km	MPC · JPL
873626	2019 SG_{7}	—	September 20, 2011	Haleakala	Pan-STARRS 1	H	440 m	MPC · JPL
873627	2019 SW_{11}	—	September 6, 2014	Mount Lemmon	Mount Lemmon Survey	·	1.3 km	MPC · JPL
873628	2019 SF_{13}	—	October 27, 2008	Kitt Peak	Spacewatch	·	2.1 km	MPC · JPL
873629	2019 SR_{13}	—	September 16, 2003	Kitt Peak	Spacewatch	·	1.1 km	MPC · JPL
873630	2019 SH_{14}	—	September 30, 2019	Haleakala	Pan-STARRS 1	(194)	1.1 km	MPC · JPL
873631	2019 ST_{14}	—	September 2, 2008	Kitt Peak	Spacewatch	·	790 m	MPC · JPL
873632	2019 SQ_{16}	—	October 2, 2013	Haleakala	Pan-STARRS 1	·	2.5 km	MPC · JPL
873633	2019 SR_{18}	—	September 2, 2008	Kitt Peak	Spacewatch	·	1.8 km	MPC · JPL
873634	2019 SF_{19}	—	October 5, 2002	Palomar	NEAT	·	1.1 km	MPC · JPL
873635	2019 SA_{26}	—	December 30, 2007	Kitt Peak	Spacewatch	(5)	910 m	MPC · JPL
873636	2019 SG_{27}	—	September 26, 2019	Haleakala	Pan-STARRS 1	·	1.8 km	MPC · JPL
873637	2019 SV_{33}	—	September 24, 2019	Haleakala	Pan-STARRS 1	EUP	2.2 km	MPC · JPL
873638	2019 SF_{34}	—	September 25, 2019	Haleakala	Pan-STARRS 1	·	2.0 km	MPC · JPL
873639	2019 SE_{35}	—	October 3, 2013	Mount Lemmon	Mount Lemmon Survey	·	2.7 km	MPC · JPL
873640	2019 SN_{42}	—	October 8, 2012	Haleakala	Pan-STARRS 1	·	650 m	MPC · JPL
873641	2019 SY_{45}	—	August 28, 2006	Kitt Peak	Spacewatch	·	790 m	MPC · JPL
873642	2019 SH_{47}	—	August 31, 2013	Haleakala	Pan-STARRS 1	·	3.1 km	MPC · JPL
873643	2019 SZ_{58}	—	September 29, 2019	Haleakala	Pan-STARRS 1	·	1.4 km	MPC · JPL
873644	2019 SZ_{59}	—	August 1, 2013	Haleakala	Pan-STARRS 1	T_{j} (2.98)	2.8 km	MPC · JPL
873645	2019 SL_{62}	—	September 29, 2019	Haleakala	Pan-STARRS 1	·	2.2 km	MPC · JPL
873646	2019 SL_{63}	—	March 31, 2016	Cerro Tololo	DECam	·	1.9 km	MPC · JPL
873647	2019 SX_{69}	—	October 23, 2008	Kitt Peak	Spacewatch	·	2.1 km	MPC · JPL
873648	2019 SY_{72}	—	October 9, 2008	Mount Lemmon	Mount Lemmon Survey	EOS	1.6 km	MPC · JPL
873649	2019 SB_{73}	—	September 3, 2013	Mount Lemmon	Mount Lemmon Survey	·	2.5 km	MPC · JPL
873650	2019 SX_{74}	—	October 4, 2014	Mount Lemmon	Mount Lemmon Survey	·	2.1 km	MPC · JPL
873651	2019 SV_{77}	—	September 23, 2008	Kitt Peak	Spacewatch	·	2.0 km	MPC · JPL
873652	2019 SB_{78}	—	October 20, 2008	Mount Lemmon	Mount Lemmon Survey	THM	1.4 km	MPC · JPL
873653	2019 SO_{84}	—	August 14, 2012	Haleakala	Pan-STARRS 1	·	540 m	MPC · JPL
873654	2019 SY_{86}	—	September 22, 2019	Mount Lemmon	Mount Lemmon Survey	·	1.0 km	MPC · JPL
873655	2019 SE_{87}	—	September 24, 2019	Haleakala	Pan-STARRS 1	·	1.9 km	MPC · JPL
873656	2019 SJ_{87}	—	September 25, 2019	Haleakala	Pan-STARRS 1	HOF	1.7 km	MPC · JPL
873657	2019 SQ_{88}	—	September 25, 2019	Haleakala	Pan-STARRS 1	·	2.2 km	MPC · JPL
873658	2019 SU_{90}	—	September 28, 2019	Mount Lemmon	Mount Lemmon Survey	·	1.8 km	MPC · JPL
873659	2019 SJ_{94}	—	September 29, 2019	Haleakala	Pan-STARRS 1	EUN	820 m	MPC · JPL
873660	2019 SP_{99}	—	September 30, 2019	Mount Lemmon	Mount Lemmon Survey	·	450 m	MPC · JPL
873661	2019 SG_{104}	—	January 16, 2013	Mount Lemmon	Mount Lemmon Survey	·	780 m	MPC · JPL
873662	2019 SR_{104}	—	January 31, 2016	Haleakala	Pan-STARRS 1	·	2.1 km	MPC · JPL
873663	2019 SY_{116}	—	May 5, 2014	Cerro Tololo-DECam	DECam	·	910 m	MPC · JPL
873664	2019 SJ_{120}	—	September 25, 2019	Haleakala	Pan-STARRS 1	·	530 m	MPC · JPL
873665	2019 SK_{120}	—	April 10, 2016	Haleakala	Pan-STARRS 1	·	2.5 km	MPC · JPL
873666	2019 SZ_{128}	—	September 26, 2019	Haleakala	Pan-STARRS 1	·	2.1 km	MPC · JPL
873667	2019 SN_{149}	—	September 27, 2019	Haleakala	Pan-STARRS 1	EUN	710 m	MPC · JPL
873668	2019 SE_{152}	—	May 20, 2015	Cerro Tololo	DECam	·	660 m	MPC · JPL
873669	2019 SA_{156}	—	March 28, 2016	Cerro Tololo	DECam	·	1.9 km	MPC · JPL
873670	2019 SF_{156}	—	September 28, 2019	Mount Lemmon	Mount Lemmon Survey	·	2.7 km	MPC · JPL
873671	2019 SO_{156}	—	September 26, 2019	Haleakala	Pan-STARRS 1	·	2.5 km	MPC · JPL
873672	2019 SJ_{157}	—	September 28, 2019	Mount Lemmon	Mount Lemmon Survey	·	2.8 km	MPC · JPL
873673	2019 SM_{157}	—	September 30, 2019	Mount Lemmon	Mount Lemmon Survey	H	360 m	MPC · JPL
873674	2019 SA_{166}	—	June 28, 2014	Haleakala	Pan-STARRS 1	·	680 m	MPC · JPL
873675	2019 SD_{166}	—	February 6, 2016	Haleakala	Pan-STARRS 1	·	2.4 km	MPC · JPL
873676	2019 SZ_{178}	—	September 26, 2019	Haleakala	Pan-STARRS 1	·	480 m	MPC · JPL
873677	2019 SJ_{183}	—	September 29, 2019	Haleakala	Pan-STARRS 1	·	460 m	MPC · JPL
873678	2019 SW_{185}	—	September 25, 2019	Haleakala	Pan-STARRS 1	·	1.9 km	MPC · JPL
873679	2019 SF_{188}	—	March 6, 2011	Kitt Peak	Spacewatch	(6355)	2.5 km	MPC · JPL
873680	2019 SM_{188}	—	May 21, 2014	Haleakala	Pan-STARRS 1	·	750 m	MPC · JPL
873681	2019 SK_{189}	—	September 29, 2019	Mount Lemmon	Mount Lemmon Survey	·	2.6 km	MPC · JPL
873682	2019 SM_{189}	—	June 21, 2010	Mount Lemmon	Mount Lemmon Survey	JUN	870 m	MPC · JPL
873683	2019 SD_{190}	—	September 29, 2019	Haleakala	Pan-STARRS 1	·	1.0 km	MPC · JPL
873684	2019 SF_{190}	—	November 17, 2014	Mount Lemmon	Mount Lemmon Survey	·	2.4 km	MPC · JPL
873685	2019 SO_{191}	—	April 13, 2018	Haleakala	Pan-STARRS 1	·	1.0 km	MPC · JPL
873686	2019 SX_{193}	—	December 12, 2014	Haleakala	Pan-STARRS 1	·	1.9 km	MPC · JPL
873687	2019 SD_{194}	—	July 8, 2014	Haleakala	Pan-STARRS 1	·	1.1 km	MPC · JPL
873688	2019 SJ_{194}	—	September 27, 2019	Haleakala	Pan-STARRS 1	EUN	970 m	MPC · JPL
873689	2019 SQ_{199}	—	September 26, 2019	Haleakala	Pan-STARRS 1	·	410 m	MPC · JPL
873690	2019 SU_{199}	—	August 16, 2013	Haleakala	Pan-STARRS 1	EOS	1.5 km	MPC · JPL
873691	2019 SQ_{206}	—	April 21, 2012	Kitt Peak	Spacewatch	·	2.1 km	MPC · JPL
873692	2019 SL_{208}	—	September 24, 2019	Haleakala	Pan-STARRS 1	·	1.6 km	MPC · JPL
873693	2019 SC_{234}	—	September 28, 2019	Haleakala	Pan-STARRS 1	·	620 m	MPC · JPL
873694	2019 SM_{245}	—	September 29, 2019	Mauna Kea	COIAS	·	1.1 km	MPC · JPL
873695	2019 SA_{249}	—	January 28, 2016	Mount Lemmon	Mount Lemmon Survey	·	2.1 km	MPC · JPL
873696	2019 TP_{2}	—	March 24, 2015	Haleakala	Pan-STARRS 1	·	570 m	MPC · JPL
873697	2019 TP_{7}	—	October 3, 2006	Catalina	CSS	T_{j} (2.92)	2.4 km	MPC · JPL
873698	2019 TW_{7}	—	September 18, 2019	Mount Lemmon	Mount Lemmon Survey	H	330 m	MPC · JPL
873699	2019 TF_{9}	—	October 6, 2019	Haleakala	Pan-STARRS 1	·	1.2 km	MPC · JPL
873700	2019 TB_{15}	—	October 9, 2019	Haleakala	Pan-STARRS 1	·	1.1 km	MPC · JPL

== 873701–873800 ==
back to top

Designation			Discovery			Properties		Ref
Permanent	Provisional	Named after	Date	Site	Discoverer(s)	Category	Diam.	Ref
873701	2019 TU_{18}	—	August 9, 2015	Haleakala	Pan-STARRS 1	·	1.0 km	MPC · JPL
873702	2019 TW_{22}	—	August 3, 2013	Haleakala	Pan-STARRS 1	·	1.8 km	MPC · JPL
873703	2019 TA_{23}	—	September 27, 2008	Mount Lemmon	Mount Lemmon Survey	·	2.1 km	MPC · JPL
873704	2019 TV_{29}	—	September 30, 2014	Mount Lemmon	Mount Lemmon Survey	·	1.8 km	MPC · JPL
873705	2019 TC_{35}	—	October 8, 2019	Haleakala	Pan-STARRS 1	EOS	1.2 km	MPC · JPL
873706	2019 TD_{35}	—	October 5, 2019	Haleakala	Pan-STARRS 1	·	2.1 km	MPC · JPL
873707	2019 TY_{35}	—	October 2, 2019	Mount Lemmon	Mount Lemmon Survey	·	2.2 km	MPC · JPL
873708	2019 TA_{37}	—	March 29, 2016	Cerro Tololo-DECam	DECam	·	1.9 km	MPC · JPL
873709	2019 TL_{37}	—	October 8, 2019	Haleakala	Pan-STARRS 1	·	1.2 km	MPC · JPL
873710	2019 TQ_{38}	—	October 6, 2008	Mount Lemmon	Mount Lemmon Survey	·	940 m	MPC · JPL
873711	2019 TX_{42}	—	October 1, 2019	Mount Lemmon	Mount Lemmon Survey	·	530 m	MPC · JPL
873712	2019 TZ_{43}	—	November 1, 2006	Kitt Peak	Spacewatch	·	930 m	MPC · JPL
873713	2019 TP_{44}	—	February 10, 2005	La Silla	A. Boattini, H. Scholl	·	1.0 km	MPC · JPL
873714	2019 TZ_{44}	—	October 5, 2019	Mount Lemmon	Mount Lemmon Survey	·	2.9 km	MPC · JPL
873715	2019 TR_{47}	—	October 1, 2019	Haleakala	Pan-STARRS 1	·	2.1 km	MPC · JPL
873716	2019 TD_{49}	—	October 10, 2008	Mount Lemmon	Mount Lemmon Survey	EOS	1.1 km	MPC · JPL
873717	2019 TU_{51}	—	November 21, 2014	Haleakala	Pan-STARRS 1	·	1.9 km	MPC · JPL
873718	2019 TS_{52}	—	February 12, 2016	Mount Lemmon	Mount Lemmon Survey	·	2.7 km	MPC · JPL
873719	2019 TF_{53}	—	October 7, 2019	Haleakala	Pan-STARRS 1	·	1.4 km	MPC · JPL
873720	2019 TQ_{66}	—	October 5, 2019	Haleakala	Pan-STARRS 1	LIX	2.4 km	MPC · JPL
873721	2019 TV_{78}	—	May 7, 2005	Mount Lemmon	Mount Lemmon Survey	·	2.3 km	MPC · JPL
873722	2019 TW_{78}	—	November 26, 2014	Mount Lemmon	Mount Lemmon Survey	·	1.4 km	MPC · JPL
873723	2019 TT_{79}	—	October 21, 2014	Mount Lemmon	Mount Lemmon Survey	VER	1.9 km	MPC · JPL
873724	2019 TX_{79}	—	October 7, 2019	Haleakala	Pan-STARRS 1	·	2.0 km	MPC · JPL
873725	2019 TX_{81}	—	October 8, 2019	Mount Lemmon	Mount Lemmon Survey	·	600 m	MPC · JPL
873726	2019 TP_{86}	—	October 6, 2019	Haleakala	Pan-STARRS 1	·	2.6 km	MPC · JPL
873727	2019 TR_{86}	—	October 9, 2019	Haleakala	Pan-STARRS 1	·	1.3 km	MPC · JPL
873728	2019 TC_{97}	—	October 9, 2019	Haleakala	Pan-STARRS 1	·	1.8 km	MPC · JPL
873729	2019 UG_{4}	—	September 17, 2014	Haleakala	Pan-STARRS 1	H	390 m	MPC · JPL
873730	2019 US_{15}	—	November 24, 2011	Haleakala	Pan-STARRS 1	·	900 m	MPC · JPL
873731	2019 UF_{25}	—	October 24, 2011	Haleakala	Pan-STARRS 1	T_{j} (2.98) · 3:2	3.1 km	MPC · JPL
873732	2019 UK_{25}	—	August 12, 2015	Haleakala	Pan-STARRS 1	·	710 m	MPC · JPL
873733	2019 UU_{26}	—	October 24, 2008	Kitt Peak	Spacewatch	·	1.9 km	MPC · JPL
873734	2019 UX_{27}	—	November 8, 2010	Mount Lemmon	Mount Lemmon Survey	AGN	780 m	MPC · JPL
873735	2019 UF_{33}	—	November 17, 2008	Kitt Peak	Spacewatch	·	1.5 km	MPC · JPL
873736	2019 UD_{35}	—	October 28, 2019	Haleakala	Pan-STARRS 1	·	460 m	MPC · JPL
873737	2019 UH_{35}	—	October 25, 2019	Haleakala	Pan-STARRS 2	EOS	1.2 km	MPC · JPL
873738	2019 UO_{35}	—	October 23, 2019	Mount Lemmon	Mount Lemmon Survey	·	600 m	MPC · JPL
873739	2019 UU_{35}	—	October 24, 2019	Mount Lemmon	Mount Lemmon Survey	·	730 m	MPC · JPL
873740	2019 UA_{36}	—	October 21, 2019	Mount Lemmon	Mount Lemmon Survey	·	1.3 km	MPC · JPL
873741	2019 UG_{38}	—	October 23, 2019	Haleakala	Pan-STARRS 1	MAR	670 m	MPC · JPL
873742	2019 UK_{48}	—	October 22, 2019	Mount Lemmon	Mount Lemmon Survey	L4	5.9 km	MPC · JPL
873743	2019 UC_{50}	—	October 22, 2019	Mount Lemmon	Mount Lemmon Survey	H	370 m	MPC · JPL
873744	2019 UB_{53}	—	October 24, 2019	Haleakala	Pan-STARRS 1	·	480 m	MPC · JPL
873745	2019 UQ_{75}	—	September 30, 2019	Mount Lemmon	Mount Lemmon Survey	·	940 m	MPC · JPL
873746	2019 UR_{76}	—	January 16, 2016	Haleakala	Pan-STARRS 1	·	1.2 km	MPC · JPL
873747	2019 UB_{87}	—	October 23, 2019	Mount Lemmon	Mount Lemmon Survey	·	1.9 km	MPC · JPL
873748	2019 UE_{92}	—	October 23, 2019	Mount Lemmon	Mount Lemmon Survey	·	490 m	MPC · JPL
873749	2019 UV_{101}	—	September 2, 2014	Haleakala	Pan-STARRS 1	·	1.6 km	MPC · JPL
873750	2019 UQ_{107}	—	January 12, 2016	Haleakala	Pan-STARRS 1	EOS	1.3 km	MPC · JPL
873751	2019 UT_{115}	—	October 25, 2019	Haleakala	Pan-STARRS 1	·	490 m	MPC · JPL
873752	2019 UX_{118}	—	January 3, 2016	Mount Lemmon	Mount Lemmon Survey	·	1.1 km	MPC · JPL
873753	2019 UH_{119}	—	January 28, 2017	Haleakala	Pan-STARRS 1	MAS	480 m	MPC · JPL
873754	2019 UM_{119}	—	October 25, 2019	Haleakala	Pan-STARRS 1	·	500 m	MPC · JPL
873755	2019 UQ_{124}	—	October 24, 2019	Haleakala	Pan-STARRS 1	·	560 m	MPC · JPL
873756	2019 UR_{124}	—	October 24, 2019	Haleakala	Pan-STARRS 1	·	1.7 km	MPC · JPL
873757	2019 UN_{127}	—	October 24, 2019	Haleakala	Pan-STARRS 1	HYG	1.8 km	MPC · JPL
873758	2019 UZ_{128}	—	March 30, 2017	Cerro Paranal	Gaia Ground Based Optical Tracking	AGN	860 m	MPC · JPL
873759	2019 UL_{129}	—	April 23, 2011	Kitt Peak	Spacewatch	·	2.8 km	MPC · JPL
873760	2019 UQ_{138}	—	October 24, 2019	Mount Lemmon	Mount Lemmon Survey	·	440 m	MPC · JPL
873761	2019 US_{138}	—	October 31, 2019	Haleakala	Pan-STARRS 2	·	610 m	MPC · JPL
873762	2019 UD_{139}	—	October 25, 2019	Haleakala	Pan-STARRS 1	·	470 m	MPC · JPL
873763	2019 UK_{141}	—	October 23, 2019	Mount Lemmon	Mount Lemmon Survey	·	3.0 km	MPC · JPL
873764	2019 UV_{151}	—	October 24, 2019	Mount Lemmon	Mount Lemmon Survey	·	1.6 km	MPC · JPL
873765	2019 VB	—	December 28, 2017	Mount Lemmon	Mount Lemmon Survey	H	340 m	MPC · JPL
873766	2019 VK_{1}	—	June 12, 2011	Mount Lemmon	Mount Lemmon Survey	·	1.1 km	MPC · JPL
873767	2019 VU_{8}	—	November 5, 2019	Haleakala	Pan-STARRS 2	H	360 m	MPC · JPL
873768	2019 VP_{10}	—	November 2, 2019	Haleakala	Pan-STARRS 1	·	450 m	MPC · JPL
873769	2019 VT_{15}	—	November 2, 2019	Haleakala	Pan-STARRS 1	·	460 m	MPC · JPL
873770	2019 VF_{30}	—	November 2, 2019	Haleakala	Pan-STARRS 1	(5)	850 m	MPC · JPL
873771	2019 VJ_{30}	—	December 27, 2014	Mount Lemmon	Mount Lemmon Survey	·	1.4 km	MPC · JPL
873772	2019 VZ_{32}	—	November 5, 2019	Mount Lemmon	Mount Lemmon Survey	·	470 m	MPC · JPL
873773	2019 VP_{36}	—	November 4, 2019	Mount Lemmon	Mount Lemmon Survey	·	490 m	MPC · JPL
873774	2019 VS_{38}	—	November 5, 2019	Haleakala	Pan-STARRS 1	TIR	2.0 km	MPC · JPL
873775	2019 VY_{49}	—	November 2, 2019	Mauna Kea	COIAS	·	700 m	MPC · JPL
873776	2019 VQ_{54}	—	November 2, 2019	Mauna Kea	COIAS	L4	3.6 km	MPC · JPL
873777	2019 VR_{56}	—	November 2, 2019	Mauna Kea	COIAS	L4	4.5 km	MPC · JPL
873778	2019 WB_{4}	—	October 23, 2019	Haleakala	Pan-STARRS 2	H	290 m	MPC · JPL
873779	2019 WZ_{7}	—	November 8, 2008	Kitt Peak	Spacewatch	·	2.0 km	MPC · JPL
873780	2019 WL_{12}	—	October 24, 2008	Mount Lemmon	Mount Lemmon Survey	·	1.8 km	MPC · JPL
873781	2019 WV_{17}	—	April 24, 2014	Cerro Tololo	DECam	·	660 m	MPC · JPL
873782	2019 WL_{18}	—	November 24, 2019	Mount Lemmon	Mount Lemmon Survey	·	3.1 km	MPC · JPL
873783	2019 WR_{18}	—	November 26, 2019	Haleakala	Pan-STARRS 1	·	530 m	MPC · JPL
873784	2019 WY_{18}	—	November 19, 2019	Mount Lemmon	Mount Lemmon Survey	·	550 m	MPC · JPL
873785	2019 WB_{19}	—	June 27, 2014	Haleakala	Pan-STARRS 1	PHO	720 m	MPC · JPL
873786	2019 WG_{19}	—	November 19, 2019	Mount Lemmon	Mount Lemmon Survey	·	460 m	MPC · JPL
873787	2019 WP_{35}	—	November 28, 2019	Mauna Kea	COIAS	·	1.1 km	MPC · JPL
873788	2019 WA_{39}	—	November 28, 2019	Mauna Kea	COIAS	·	1.8 km	MPC · JPL
873789	2019 WG_{43}	—	November 29, 2019	Mauna Kea	COIAS	·	1.1 km	MPC · JPL
873790	2019 XS_{4}	—	December 2, 2019	Mount Lemmon	Mount Lemmon Survey	MAR	680 m	MPC · JPL
873791	2019 XU_{4}	—	December 2, 2019	Mount Lemmon	Mount Lemmon Survey	V	480 m	MPC · JPL
873792	2019 XY_{4}	—	December 6, 2019	Mount Lemmon	Mount Lemmon Survey	·	1.3 km	MPC · JPL
873793	2019 XJ_{8}	—	September 17, 2018	Kitt Peak	Spacewatch	·	2.3 km	MPC · JPL
873794	2019 XY_{8}	—	December 6, 2019	Mount Lemmon	Mount Lemmon Survey	PHO	870 m	MPC · JPL
873795	2019 XO_{9}	—	August 13, 2018	Haleakala	Pan-STARRS 1	·	2.3 km	MPC · JPL
873796	2019 XM_{13}	—	December 6, 2012	Mount Lemmon	Mount Lemmon Survey	V	350 m	MPC · JPL
873797	2019 XT_{15}	—	December 7, 2019	Mount Lemmon	Mount Lemmon Survey	·	610 m	MPC · JPL
873798	2019 XZ_{15}	—	December 2, 2019	Mount Lemmon	Mount Lemmon Survey	·	920 m	MPC · JPL
873799	2019 XL_{24}	—	December 6, 2019	Mount Lemmon	Mount Lemmon Survey	·	1.0 km	MPC · JPL
873800	2019 YX_{7}	—	December 30, 2019	Kitt Peak-Bok	Bok NEO Survey	·	520 m	MPC · JPL

== 873801–873900 ==
back to top

Designation			Discovery			Properties		Ref
Permanent	Provisional	Named after	Date	Site	Discoverer(s)	Category	Diam.	Ref
873801	2019 YS_{8}	—	December 21, 2019	Mount Lemmon	Mount Lemmon Survey	·	1.2 km	MPC · JPL
873802	2019 YN_{9}	—	December 24, 2019	Haleakala	Pan-STARRS 1	·	750 m	MPC · JPL
873803	2019 YQ_{9}	—	December 28, 2019	Haleakala	Pan-STARRS 1	·	980 m	MPC · JPL
873804	2019 YW_{9}	—	December 30, 2019	Kitt Peak-Bok	Bok NEO Survey	·	360 m	MPC · JPL
873805	2019 YK_{10}	—	December 20, 2019	Mount Lemmon	Mount Lemmon Survey	·	2.5 km	MPC · JPL
873806	2019 YG_{13}	—	March 29, 2017	Haleakala	Pan-STARRS 1	·	540 m	MPC · JPL
873807	2019 YA_{18}	—	May 8, 2013	Haleakala	Pan-STARRS 1	ERI	1.1 km	MPC · JPL
873808	2019 YB_{20}	—	January 20, 2013	Mount Lemmon	Mount Lemmon Survey	·	680 m	MPC · JPL
873809	2019 YS_{21}	—	October 10, 2018	Haleakala	Pan-STARRS 2	·	1.9 km	MPC · JPL
873810	2019 YD_{32}	—	December 30, 2019	Haleakala	Pan-STARRS 1	·	1.9 km	MPC · JPL
873811	2019 YG_{38}	—	December 30, 2019	Kitt Peak-Bok	Bok NEO Survey	H	330 m	MPC · JPL
873812	2019 YW_{38}	—	December 28, 2019	Haleakala	Pan-STARRS 1	·	1.4 km	MPC · JPL
873813	2019 YQ_{39}	—	December 24, 2019	Haleakala	Pan-STARRS 1	PHO	630 m	MPC · JPL
873814	2019 YF_{41}	—	December 24, 2019	Haleakala	Pan-STARRS 1	·	440 m	MPC · JPL
873815	2019 YQ_{44}	—	December 28, 2019	Haleakala	Pan-STARRS 2	·	730 m	MPC · JPL
873816	2019 YY_{44}	—	September 6, 2008	Mount Lemmon	Mount Lemmon Survey	·	490 m	MPC · JPL
873817	2019 YP_{53}	—	November 29, 2014	Haleakala	Pan-STARRS 1	·	2.7 km	MPC · JPL
873818	2020 AV_{5}	—	January 1, 2020	Haleakala	Pan-STARRS 1	·	2.0 km	MPC · JPL
873819	2020 AB_{6}	—	February 5, 2011	Haleakala	Pan-STARRS 1	EUN	880 m	MPC · JPL
873820	2020 AN_{6}	—	January 2, 2020	Haleakala	Pan-STARRS 1	·	590 m	MPC · JPL
873821	2020 AM_{8}	—	August 16, 2017	Haleakala	Pan-STARRS 1	VER	2.0 km	MPC · JPL
873822	2020 AQ_{10}	—	February 14, 2013	Kitt Peak	Spacewatch	·	620 m	MPC · JPL
873823	2020 AV_{11}	—	February 3, 2009	Kitt Peak	Spacewatch	·	2.4 km	MPC · JPL
873824	2020 AS_{12}	—	January 1, 2020	Haleakala	Pan-STARRS 1	·	1.6 km	MPC · JPL
873825	2020 AY_{15}	—	October 26, 2011	Haleakala	Pan-STARRS 1	·	910 m	MPC · JPL
873826	2020 AH_{17}	—	January 1, 2020	Haleakala	Pan-STARRS 1	·	2.0 km	MPC · JPL
873827	2020 AK_{20}	—	January 2, 2020	Haleakala	Pan-STARRS 1	EOS	1.4 km	MPC · JPL
873828	2020 AU_{21}	—	October 12, 2018	XuYi	PMO NEO Survey Program	T_{j} (2.97)	2.5 km	MPC · JPL
873829	2020 AW_{22}	—	January 4, 2020	Mount Lemmon	Mount Lemmon Survey	·	2.1 km	MPC · JPL
873830	2020 AZ_{22}	—	September 22, 2016	Haleakala	Pan-STARRS 1	H	400 m	MPC · JPL
873831	2020 AT_{23}	—	May 25, 2015	Haleakala	Pan-STARRS 1	H	340 m	MPC · JPL
873832	2020 BT_{9}	—	January 26, 2020	Haleakala	Pan-STARRS 1	H	250 m	MPC · JPL
873833	2020 BX_{17}	—	April 12, 2016	Haleakala	Pan-STARRS 1	·	1.3 km	MPC · JPL
873834	2020 BP_{18}	—	January 21, 2020	Haleakala	Pan-STARRS 1	·	1.2 km	MPC · JPL
873835	2020 BK_{19}	—	March 30, 2016	Cerro Tololo	DECam	·	850 m	MPC · JPL
873836	2020 BU_{19}	—	January 30, 2020	Mount Lemmon	Mount Lemmon Survey	·	1.1 km	MPC · JPL
873837	2020 BB_{22}	—	April 18, 2015	Cerro Tololo	DECam	VER	1.6 km	MPC · JPL
873838	2020 BC_{22}	—	April 18, 2015	Cerro Tololo	DECam	·	2.3 km	MPC · JPL
873839	2020 BF_{24}	—	March 6, 2013	Haleakala	Pan-STARRS 1	·	750 m	MPC · JPL
873840	2020 BL_{26}	—	December 12, 2015	Haleakala	Pan-STARRS 1	·	1.1 km	MPC · JPL
873841	2020 BW_{31}	—	January 22, 2020	Haleakala	Pan-STARRS 2	H	390 m	MPC · JPL
873842	2020 BY_{31}	—	January 22, 2020	Haleakala	Pan-STARRS 2	MAS	620 m	MPC · JPL
873843	2020 BU_{32}	—	February 15, 2013	Haleakala	Pan-STARRS 1	·	590 m	MPC · JPL
873844	2020 BR_{33}	—	January 25, 2009	Kitt Peak	Spacewatch	PHO	660 m	MPC · JPL
873845	2020 BS_{33}	—	January 2, 2016	Mount Lemmon	Mount Lemmon Survey	·	810 m	MPC · JPL
873846	2020 BF_{35}	—	February 19, 2009	Kitt Peak	Spacewatch	·	790 m	MPC · JPL
873847	2020 BQ_{36}	—	April 11, 2016	Haleakala	Pan-STARRS 1	EUN	830 m	MPC · JPL
873848	2020 BC_{46}	—	October 14, 2007	Mount Lemmon	Mount Lemmon Survey	·	2.4 km	MPC · JPL
873849	2020 BY_{46}	—	January 25, 2020	Mount Lemmon	Mount Lemmon Survey	GAL	1.2 km	MPC · JPL
873850	2020 BW_{57}	—	January 21, 2020	Haleakala	Pan-STARRS 2	NYS	810 m	MPC · JPL
873851	2020 BG_{58}	—	July 26, 2017	Haleakala	Pan-STARRS 1	EOS	1.3 km	MPC · JPL
873852	2020 BG_{61}	—	January 23, 2020	Mount Lemmon	Mount Lemmon Survey	·	930 m	MPC · JPL
873853	2020 BV_{62}	—	November 8, 2018	Haleakala	Pan-STARRS 2	·	1.2 km	MPC · JPL
873854	2020 BW_{63}	—	March 6, 2016	Haleakala	Pan-STARRS 1	·	850 m	MPC · JPL
873855	2020 BK_{67}	—	March 4, 2005	Mount Lemmon	Mount Lemmon Survey	·	940 m	MPC · JPL
873856	2020 BK_{72}	—	November 5, 2007	Kitt Peak	Spacewatch	VER	1.8 km	MPC · JPL
873857	2020 BU_{72}	—	September 26, 2006	Mount Lemmon	Mount Lemmon Survey	·	740 m	MPC · JPL
873858	2020 BG_{73}	—	January 29, 2012	Mount Lemmon	Mount Lemmon Survey	H	370 m	MPC · JPL
873859	2020 BV_{73}	—	July 12, 2015	Haleakala	Pan-STARRS 1	3:2	3.9 km	MPC · JPL
873860	2020 BR_{74}	—	January 21, 2020	Haleakala	Pan-STARRS 2	H	340 m	MPC · JPL
873861	2020 BR_{78}	—	January 17, 2015	Mount Lemmon	Mount Lemmon Survey	·	1.4 km	MPC · JPL
873862	2020 BU_{80}	—	January 28, 2015	Haleakala	Pan-STARRS 1	·	1.8 km	MPC · JPL
873863	2020 BC_{82}	—	August 9, 2013	Haleakala	Pan-STARRS 1	·	1.1 km	MPC · JPL
873864	2020 BQ_{83}	—	April 23, 2014	Cerro Tololo	DECam	V	360 m	MPC · JPL
873865	2020 BC_{86}	—	January 7, 2009	Kitt Peak	Spacewatch	·	800 m	MPC · JPL
873866	2020 BD_{87}	—	January 21, 2020	Haleakala	Pan-STARRS 2	·	450 m	MPC · JPL
873867	2020 BV_{89}	—	January 24, 2020	Mount Lemmon	Mount Lemmon Survey	·	850 m	MPC · JPL
873868	2020 BX_{89}	—	September 5, 2010	Mount Lemmon	Mount Lemmon Survey	·	930 m	MPC · JPL
873869	2020 BC_{90}	—	January 23, 2020	Haleakala	Pan-STARRS 1	·	520 m	MPC · JPL
873870	2020 BD_{91}	—	January 24, 2020	Mount Lemmon	Mount Lemmon Survey	·	760 m	MPC · JPL
873871	2020 BT_{91}	—	January 23, 2020	Haleakala	Pan-STARRS 1	·	1.1 km	MPC · JPL
873872	2020 BE_{95}	—	January 25, 2020	Mount Lemmon	Mount Lemmon Survey	·	750 m	MPC · JPL
873873	2020 BJ_{95}	—	May 23, 2014	Haleakala	Pan-STARRS 1	·	570 m	MPC · JPL
873874	2020 BQ_{96}	—	July 25, 2017	Haleakala	Pan-STARRS 1	·	2.5 km	MPC · JPL
873875	2020 BT_{96}	—	January 22, 2020	Haleakala	Pan-STARRS 1	·	2.1 km	MPC · JPL
873876	2020 BE_{97}	—	January 21, 2020	Haleakala	Pan-STARRS 1	·	920 m	MPC · JPL
873877	2020 BK_{98}	—	January 21, 2015	Haleakala	Pan-STARRS 1	·	2.2 km	MPC · JPL
873878	2020 BP_{98}	—	November 1, 2015	Haleakala	Pan-STARRS 1	·	490 m	MPC · JPL
873879	2020 BA_{100}	—	July 9, 2018	Haleakala	Pan-STARRS 1	PHO	660 m	MPC · JPL
873880	2020 BB_{101}	—	January 23, 2020	Haleakala	Pan-STARRS 1	·	780 m	MPC · JPL
873881	2020 BF_{117}	—	January 25, 2020	Mount Lemmon	Mount Lemmon Survey	·	1.0 km	MPC · JPL
873882	2020 BB_{118}	—	January 26, 2020	Mount Lemmon	Mount Lemmon Survey	·	1.5 km	MPC · JPL
873883	2020 BE_{142}	—	January 27, 2020	Mount Lemmon	Mount Lemmon Survey	·	2.1 km	MPC · JPL
873884	2020 BC_{147}	—	November 2, 2007	Kitt Peak	Spacewatch	·	960 m	MPC · JPL
873885	2020 BV_{153}	—	January 25, 2020	Mount Lemmon	Mount Lemmon Survey	·	920 m	MPC · JPL
873886	2020 BQ_{155}	—	January 25, 2020	Mount Lemmon	Mount Lemmon Survey	·	520 m	MPC · JPL
873887	2020 CF_{3}	—	January 23, 2020	Haleakala	Pan-STARRS 2	V	410 m	MPC · JPL
873888	2020 CY_{3}	—	February 2, 2020	Mount Lemmon	Mount Lemmon Survey	·	750 m	MPC · JPL
873889	2020 CD_{4}	—	February 1, 2020	Mount Lemmon	Mount Lemmon Survey	PHO	570 m	MPC · JPL
873890	2020 CT_{4}	—	February 5, 2020	Haleakala	Pan-STARRS 1	·	1.2 km	MPC · JPL
873891	2020 CK_{7}	—	February 1, 2020	Mount Lemmon	Mount Lemmon Survey	PHO	610 m	MPC · JPL
873892	2020 CU_{7}	—	February 3, 2020	Haleakala	Pan-STARRS 1	HNS	820 m	MPC · JPL
873893	2020 DB_{5}	—	February 29, 2020	Kitt Peak-Bok	Bok NEO Survey	AMO · PHA	510 m	MPC · JPL
873894	2020 DJ_{7}	—	February 20, 2020	Mount Lemmon	Mount Lemmon Survey	PHO	620 m	MPC · JPL
873895	2020 DV_{7}	—	February 1, 2016	Haleakala	Pan-STARRS 1	V	420 m	MPC · JPL
873896	2020 DY_{9}	—	February 17, 2020	Mount Lemmon	Mount Lemmon Survey	·	1.3 km	MPC · JPL
873897	2020 DN_{10}	—	February 16, 2020	Mount Lemmon	Mount Lemmon Survey	·	690 m	MPC · JPL
873898	2020 DE_{12}	—	March 8, 2010	WISE	WISE	EUP	2.2 km	MPC · JPL
873899	2020 DE_{13}	—	June 25, 2017	Haleakala	Pan-STARRS 1	·	860 m	MPC · JPL
873900	2020 DN_{13}	—	February 20, 2020	Mount Lemmon	Mount Lemmon Survey	H	400 m	MPC · JPL

== 873901–874000 ==
back to top

Designation			Discovery			Properties		Ref
Permanent	Provisional	Named after	Date	Site	Discoverer(s)	Category	Diam.	Ref
873901	2020 DG_{14}	—	March 19, 2016	Kitt Peak	Spacewatch	·	860 m	MPC · JPL
873902	2020 DQ_{14}	—	February 19, 2020	Palomar Mountain	Zwicky Transient Facility	H	340 m	MPC · JPL
873903	2020 EA_{3}	—	March 5, 2020	Mount Lemmon	Mount Lemmon Survey	·	930 m	MPC · JPL
873904	2020 ET_{4}	—	March 5, 2020	Cerro Tololo-DECam	DECam	L5	6.1 km	MPC · JPL
873905	2020 FL_{10}	—	February 26, 2011	Mount Lemmon	Mount Lemmon Survey	·	930 m	MPC · JPL
873906	2020 FQ_{10}	—	March 21, 2020	Haleakala	Pan-STARRS 1	L5	6.3 km	MPC · JPL
873907	2020 FV_{10}	—	March 29, 2020	Haleakala	Pan-STARRS 2	·	950 m	MPC · JPL
873908	2020 FE_{11}	—	March 21, 2020	Haleakala	Pan-STARRS 1	·	870 m	MPC · JPL
873909	2020 FM_{11}	—	March 21, 2020	Haleakala	Pan-STARRS 1	·	780 m	MPC · JPL
873910	2020 FV_{12}	—	March 21, 2020	Haleakala	Pan-STARRS 1	·	1.1 km	MPC · JPL
873911	2020 FX_{12}	—	March 21, 2020	Haleakala	Pan-STARRS 1	·	920 m	MPC · JPL
873912	2020 FY_{12}	—	April 6, 2011	Mount Lemmon	Mount Lemmon Survey	·	1.1 km	MPC · JPL
873913	2020 FF_{13}	—	March 22, 2020	Haleakala	Pan-STARRS 1	·	1.0 km	MPC · JPL
873914	2020 FX_{13}	—	January 29, 2011	Mount Lemmon	Mount Lemmon Survey	·	820 m	MPC · JPL
873915	2020 FE_{14}	—	May 28, 2012	Mount Lemmon	Mount Lemmon Survey	·	1.2 km	MPC · JPL
873916	2020 FP_{14}	—	March 21, 2020	Haleakala	Pan-STARRS 2	·	540 m	MPC · JPL
873917	2020 FE_{16}	—	April 25, 2003	Kitt Peak	Spacewatch	·	800 m	MPC · JPL
873918	2020 FF_{16}	—	March 21, 2020	Haleakala	Pan-STARRS 1	·	860 m	MPC · JPL
873919	2020 FP_{16}	—	March 21, 2020	Haleakala	Pan-STARRS 1	HNS	830 m	MPC · JPL
873920	2020 FA_{17}	—	April 14, 2016	Haleakala	Pan-STARRS 1	MAR	630 m	MPC · JPL
873921	2020 FG_{19}	—	March 21, 2020	Haleakala	Pan-STARRS 1	·	880 m	MPC · JPL
873922	2020 FW_{21}	—	March 21, 2020	Haleakala	Pan-STARRS 2	V	510 m	MPC · JPL
873923	2020 FZ_{22}	—	April 12, 2016	Haleakala	Pan-STARRS 1	·	890 m	MPC · JPL
873924	2020 FT_{24}	—	May 11, 2007	Kitt Peak	Spacewatch	·	920 m	MPC · JPL
873925	2020 FE_{26}	—	January 14, 2016	Haleakala	Pan-STARRS 1	·	880 m	MPC · JPL
873926	2020 FU_{31}	—	March 16, 2020	Mount Lemmon	Mount Lemmon Survey	H	350 m	MPC · JPL
873927	2020 GC_{4}	—	April 2, 2020	Mount Lemmon	Mount Lemmon Survey	·	530 m	MPC · JPL
873928	2020 GD_{4}	—	April 3, 2020	Mount Lemmon	Mount Lemmon Survey	THM	1.6 km	MPC · JPL
873929	2020 GE_{4}	—	April 3, 2020	Mount Lemmon	Mount Lemmon Survey	·	940 m	MPC · JPL
873930	2020 GZ_{7}	—	March 24, 2009	Mount Lemmon	Mount Lemmon Survey	·	700 m	MPC · JPL
873931	2020 GB_{8}	—	April 3, 2020	Mount Lemmon	Mount Lemmon Survey	·	940 m	MPC · JPL
873932	2020 GR_{9}	—	June 9, 2016	Haleakala	Pan-STARRS 1	JUN	620 m	MPC · JPL
873933	2020 GF_{10}	—	April 2, 2020	Mount Lemmon	Mount Lemmon Survey	·	1.3 km	MPC · JPL
873934	2020 GV_{10}	—	April 2, 2020	Haleakala	Pan-STARRS 1	·	960 m	MPC · JPL
873935	2020 GY_{10}	—	April 2, 2020	Haleakala	Pan-STARRS 1	·	1.0 km	MPC · JPL
873936	2020 GQ_{12}	—	April 3, 2020	Mount Lemmon	Mount Lemmon Survey	·	1.1 km	MPC · JPL
873937	2020 GA_{15}	—	March 25, 2007	Mount Lemmon	Mount Lemmon Survey	·	1.1 km	MPC · JPL
873938	2020 GB_{15}	—	April 15, 2020	Mount Lemmon	Mount Lemmon Survey	EUN	770 m	MPC · JPL
873939	2020 GD_{16}	—	April 27, 2012	Mount Lemmon	Mount Lemmon Survey	H	350 m	MPC · JPL
873940	2020 GO_{19}	—	September 15, 2017	Haleakala	Pan-STARRS 1	BRG	880 m	MPC · JPL
873941	2020 GP_{26}	—	April 15, 2020	Mount Lemmon	Mount Lemmon Survey	·	980 m	MPC · JPL
873942	2020 GG_{30}	—	April 15, 2020	Mount Lemmon	Mount Lemmon Survey	L5	5.7 km	MPC · JPL
873943	2020 GL_{31}	—	January 14, 2016	Haleakala	Pan-STARRS 1	·	710 m	MPC · JPL
873944	2020 GL_{33}	—	December 16, 2014	Haleakala	Pan-STARRS 1	EUN	690 m	MPC · JPL
873945	2020 HX_{10}	—	April 22, 2020	Haleakala	Pan-STARRS 1	·	820 m	MPC · JPL
873946	2020 HA_{15}	—	April 16, 2020	Haleakala	Pan-STARRS 2	·	1.1 km	MPC · JPL
873947	2020 HW_{15}	—	September 2, 2008	Siding Spring	SSS	·	1.3 km	MPC · JPL
873948	2020 HE_{16}	—	April 14, 2016	Haleakala	Pan-STARRS 1	·	1.0 km	MPC · JPL
873949	2020 HC_{17}	—	June 24, 2017	Haleakala	Pan-STARRS 1	·	440 m	MPC · JPL
873950	2020 HT_{21}	—	March 25, 2015	Haleakala	Pan-STARRS 1	·	1.5 km	MPC · JPL
873951	2020 HL_{24}	—	August 24, 2017	Haleakala	Pan-STARRS 1	·	670 m	MPC · JPL
873952	2020 HN_{24}	—	October 10, 2012	Haleakala	Pan-STARRS 1	·	1.0 km	MPC · JPL
873953	2020 HT_{25}	—	January 29, 2011	Mount Lemmon	Mount Lemmon Survey	(5)	930 m	MPC · JPL
873954	2020 HR_{26}	—	February 3, 2013	Haleakala	Pan-STARRS 1	·	470 m	MPC · JPL
873955	2020 HS_{26}	—	October 13, 2013	Kitt Peak	Spacewatch	·	870 m	MPC · JPL
873956	2020 HF_{29}	—	December 3, 2015	Haleakala	Pan-STARRS 1	PHO	730 m	MPC · JPL
873957	2020 HP_{32}	—	April 22, 2020	Haleakala	Pan-STARRS 1	(1547)	1.2 km	MPC · JPL
873958	2020 HE_{33}	—	April 21, 2020	Haleakala	Pan-STARRS 2	·	1.1 km	MPC · JPL
873959	2020 HN_{34}	—	April 21, 2020	Haleakala	Pan-STARRS 1	·	1.0 km	MPC · JPL
873960	2020 HY_{34}	—	April 16, 2020	Mount Lemmon	Mount Lemmon Survey	·	830 m	MPC · JPL
873961	2020 HR_{35}	—	March 22, 2015	Haleakala	Pan-STARRS 1	·	960 m	MPC · JPL
873962	2020 HA_{36}	—	October 30, 2017	Haleakala	Pan-STARRS 1	PHO	770 m	MPC · JPL
873963	2020 HQ_{36}	—	April 16, 2020	Mount Lemmon	Mount Lemmon Survey	·	1.0 km	MPC · JPL
873964	2020 HL_{37}	—	July 13, 2013	Haleakala	Pan-STARRS 1	V	450 m	MPC · JPL
873965	2020 HP_{37}	—	April 21, 2020	Haleakala	Pan-STARRS 2	·	740 m	MPC · JPL
873966	2020 HU_{37}	—	April 21, 2020	Haleakala	Pan-STARRS 2	ADE	1.2 km	MPC · JPL
873967	2020 HV_{37}	—	April 18, 2020	Haleakala	Pan-STARRS 1	·	480 m	MPC · JPL
873968	2020 HH_{38}	—	April 16, 2020	Mount Lemmon	Mount Lemmon Survey	·	940 m	MPC · JPL
873969	2020 HV_{38}	—	April 16, 2020	Mount Lemmon	Mount Lemmon Survey	·	990 m	MPC · JPL
873970	2020 HK_{40}	—	April 16, 2020	Mount Lemmon	Mount Lemmon Survey	KON	1.4 km	MPC · JPL
873971	2020 HN_{43}	—	December 9, 2015	Haleakala	Pan-STARRS 1	·	460 m	MPC · JPL
873972	2020 HJ_{44}	—	May 20, 2015	Cerro Tololo	DECam	·	1.1 km	MPC · JPL
873973	2020 HZ_{45}	—	June 22, 2017	Haleakala	Pan-STARRS 1	·	530 m	MPC · JPL
873974	2020 HF_{48}	—	April 18, 2020	Haleakala	Pan-STARRS 1	EUN	750 m	MPC · JPL
873975	2020 HU_{50}	—	April 19, 2020	Haleakala	Pan-STARRS 2	·	1.2 km	MPC · JPL
873976	2020 HV_{51}	—	April 20, 2020	Haleakala	Pan-STARRS 1	EUN	770 m	MPC · JPL
873977	2020 HU_{53}	—	April 21, 2020	Haleakala	Pan-STARRS 1	(5)	930 m	MPC · JPL
873978	2020 HN_{57}	—	April 21, 2020	Haleakala	Pan-STARRS 2	·	940 m	MPC · JPL
873979	2020 HC_{59}	—	September 2, 2008	Kitt Peak	Spacewatch	·	960 m	MPC · JPL
873980	2020 HV_{60}	—	December 16, 2014	Haleakala	Pan-STARRS 1	·	1.2 km	MPC · JPL
873981	2020 HU_{61}	—	April 26, 2020	Mount Lemmon	Mount Lemmon Survey	·	1.1 km	MPC · JPL
873982	2020 HE_{62}	—	April 27, 2020	Haleakala	Pan-STARRS 1	EUN	750 m	MPC · JPL
873983	2020 HW_{62}	—	April 27, 2020	Mount Lemmon	Mount Lemmon Survey	MAR	690 m	MPC · JPL
873984	2020 HC_{65}	—	April 5, 2019	Haleakala	Pan-STARRS 1	L5	6.4 km	MPC · JPL
873985	2020 HG_{65}	—	April 22, 2020	Haleakala	Pan-STARRS 1	·	1.2 km	MPC · JPL
873986	2020 HB_{68}	—	April 19, 2020	Haleakala	Pan-STARRS 1	·	870 m	MPC · JPL
873987	2020 HK_{76}	—	April 21, 2020	Haleakala	Pan-STARRS 1	L5	6.3 km	MPC · JPL
873988	2020 HQ_{78}	—	April 21, 2020	Haleakala	Pan-STARRS 1	·	890 m	MPC · JPL
873989	2020 HE_{80}	—	April 27, 2020	Haleakala	Pan-STARRS 1	·	970 m	MPC · JPL
873990	2020 HJ_{81}	—	April 20, 2020	Haleakala	Pan-STARRS 1	L5	6.6 km	MPC · JPL
873991	2020 HU_{81}	—	November 8, 2013	Mount Lemmon	Mount Lemmon Survey	L5	7.0 km	MPC · JPL
873992	2020 HC_{84}	—	November 13, 2017	Haleakala	Pan-STARRS 1	·	710 m	MPC · JPL
873993	2020 HE_{85}	—	April 16, 2020	Haleakala	Pan-STARRS 1	·	860 m	MPC · JPL
873994	2020 HL_{89}	—	April 25, 2020	Mount Lemmon	Mount Lemmon Survey	·	960 m	MPC · JPL
873995	2020 HH_{92}	—	May 20, 2015	Cerro Tololo	DECam	·	1.2 km	MPC · JPL
873996	2020 HS_{92}	—	April 20, 2020	Haleakala	Pan-STARRS 1	L5	6.0 km	MPC · JPL
873997	2020 HP_{93}	—	April 22, 2020	Haleakala	Pan-STARRS 1	VER	1.9 km	MPC · JPL
873998	2020 HJ_{94}	—	April 21, 2020	Haleakala	Pan-STARRS 1	·	1.3 km	MPC · JPL
873999	2020 HL_{95}	—	April 24, 2020	Mount Lemmon	Mount Lemmon Survey	ADE	1.2 km	MPC · JPL
874000	2020 HH_{98}	—	April 24, 2020	Mount Lemmon	Mount Lemmon Survey	·	1.1 km	MPC · JPL

back to top
