= 7638 Gladman =

Main-belt asteroid

Discovery
- Discovered by: E. Bowell
- Discovery site: Anderson Mesa Stn.
- Discovery date: 26 October 1984

Designations
- Named after: Brett J. Gladman (Canadian astronomer)
- Alternative designations: 1984 UX · 1969 AF; 1988 UN
- Minor planet category: main-belt · (middle) background

Orbital characteristics
- Epoch 27 April 2019 (JD 2458600.5)
- Uncertainty parameter 0
- Observation arc: 49.46 yr (18,066 d)
- Aphelion: 3.3331 AU
- Perihelion: 1.7459 AU
- Semi-major axis: 2.5395 AU
- Eccentricity: 0.3125
- Orbital period (sidereal): 4.05 yr (1,478 d)
- Mean anomaly: 198.89°
- Mean motion: 0° 14^{m} 36.6^{s} / day
- Inclination: 6.8157°
- Longitude of ascending node: 9.9754°
- Argument of perihelion: 22.493°

Physical characteristics
- Mean diameter: 5.839±0.405 km
- Synodic rotation period: 17.3±0.1 h
- Geometric albedo: 0.248±0.071; 0.2480±0.0715
- Spectral type: S/Sk (S3OS2)
- Absolute magnitude (H): 13.3; 13.478±0.005 (R); 13.5

7638 Gladman, provisional designation 1984 UX, is a stony background asteroid from the central region of the asteroid belt, approximately 5.8 kilometers (3.6 miles) in diameter. It was discovered on 26 October 1984, by American astronomer Edward Bowell at Lowell's Anderson Mesa Station near Flagstaff, Arizona. The S-type asteroid has a rotation period of 17.3 hours. It was named after Canadian astronomer Brett J. Gladman.

== Orbit and classification ==
Gladman is a non-family asteroid from the main belt's background population. It orbits the Sun in the central asteroid belt at a distance of 1.7–3.3 AU once every 4 years and 1 month (1,478 days; semi-major axis of 2.54 AU). Its orbit has an eccentricity of 0.31 and an inclination of 7° with respect to the ecliptic. Gladman is not far from a prominent Kirkwood gap at 2.5 AU, which corresponds to a 3:1 orbital resonance with the gas giant Jupiter, where the Alinda asteroid are located. However, Gladman's eccentricity is lower than that of most Alinda asteroids.

It was first observed as 1969 AF at Crimea–Nauchnij in January 1969. The asteroid's observation arc begins with its first used observation at Palomar in November 1984, one month after its official discovery at Anderson Mesa.

== Naming ==
This minor planet was named for Canadian astronomer Brett J. Gladman (born 1966), discoverer of minor planets and co-discoverer of 6 irregular moons of Uranus: Caliban, Sycorax, Prospero, Setebos, Stephano and Ferdinand. He participated in surveys of trans-Neptunian objects. He is also known for his research and modeling on the dynamical evolution and transport of near-Earth objects and meteorites, respectively. The approved naming citation was published by the Minor Planet Center on 28 July 1999 (M.P.C. 35486).

== Physical characteristics ==
Gladman has been characterized as a stony S-type asteroid in the Tholen-like taxonomy of the Small Solar System Objects Spectroscopic Survey (S3OS2). In their SMASS-like taxonomy, S3OS2 classified Gladman as an Sk-subtype that transitions to the K-type asteroids.

=== Rotation period ===
Three rotational lightcurves of Gladman have been obtained from photometric observations. In October 2014, observations by French amateur astronomer Laurent Bernasconi gave a fragmentary lightcurve with a rotation period of 15 hours and brightness variation of 0.21 magnitude (U=1+). Subsequent photometric observations by James W. Brinsfield at the Via Capote Observatory (G69) in October 2010, and by astronomers at the Palomar Transient Factory in March 2014, gave an improved period of 17.3 (best) and 16.1956 hours with a brightness amplitude of 0.50 and 0.25, respectively (U=2/2).

=== Diameter and albedo ===
According to the survey carried out by NASA's Wide-field Infrared Survey Explorer with its subsequent NEOWISE mission, the asteroid measures 5.839 kilometers in diameter and its surface has an albedo of 0.248, while the Collaborative Asteroid Lightcurve Link assumes a standard albedo for stony asteroids of 0.20 and calculates a diameter of 5.9 kilometers with an absolute magnitude of 13.5.
