= Themisto (moon) =

Outer moon of Jupiter

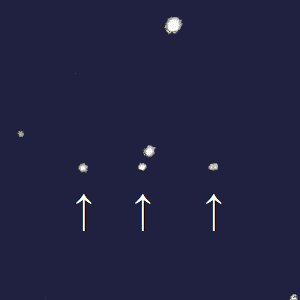
- Rediscovery images of Themisto taken by the UH88 telescope in November 2000

Discovery
- Discovered by: Charles T. Kowal (1975); Elizabeth P. Roemer (1975); Scott S. Sheppard (2000); David C. Jewitt (2000); Yanga R. Fernández (2000); Eugene A. Magnier (2000)
- Discovery site: Palomar Observatory; Mauna Kea Observatory (rediscovery)
- Discovery date: 30 September 1975; 21 November 2000 (rediscovery)

Designations
- Designation: Jupiter XVIII
- Pronunciation: /θəˈmɪstoʊ/
- Named after: Θεμιστώ Themistō
- Alternative names: S/2000 J 1 S/1975 J 1
- Adjectives: Themistoan /θɛməˈstoʊ.ən/ Themistoian /θɛməˈstoʊ.iən/

Orbital characteristics
- Epoch 23 March 2018 (JD 2458200.5)
- Observation arc: 42.54 yr (15,536 days)
- Semi-major axis: 0.0494401 AU (7,396,130 km)
- Eccentricity: 0.2522112
- Orbital period (sidereal): +129.95 d
- Mean anomaly: 2.39396°
- Mean motion: 2° 46^{m} 13.369^{s} / day
- Inclination: 45.28121° (to ecliptic)
- Longitude of ascending node: 192.64162°
- Argument of perihelion: 241.25168°
- Satellite of: Jupiter
- Group: (own group)

Physical characteristics
- Mean diameter: 9 km 16.4 km
- Albedo: 0.04 (assumed)
- Apparent magnitude: 21.0
- Absolute magnitude (H): 12.9; 13.06±0.34 (V)

Themisto (/θəˈmɪstoʊ/), also known as Jupiter XVIII, is the innermost and one of the medium-sized irregular satellites of Jupiter.

== Discovery and naming ==
Themisto observed by the Canada–France–Hawaii Telescope on 6 August 2000, several months before its rediscovery in November 2000

Themisto was first discovered by Charles T. Kowal and Elizabeth Roemer on 30 September 1975, reported on 3 October 1975, and designated S/1975 J 1. However, not enough observations were made to establish an orbit and it was subsequently lost.

Then, on 21 November 2000, a seemingly new satellite was discovered by Scott S. Sheppard, David C. Jewitt, Yanga R. Fernández and Eugene A. Magnier and was designated S/2000 J 1. It was soon confirmed from computing the past trajectory of the satellite that this was the same as the one observed in 1975. This observation was immediately correlated with an earlier observation on 6 August 2000 by the team of Brett J. Gladman, John J. Kavelaars, Jean-Marc Petit, Hans Scholl, Matthew J. Holman, Brian G. Marsden, Philip D. Nicholson and Joseph A. Burns, which was reported to the Minor Planet Center but not published as an IAU Circular (IAUC).

In October 2002, it was officially named after Themisto, daughter of the river god Inachus and lover of Zeus (Jupiter) in Greek mythology.

== Orbit ==
Diagram illustrating Themisto's orbit (top left) among those of the other irregular satellites of Jupiter. The satellites above the horizontal axis are prograde, the satellites beneath it are retrograde. The yellow segments extend from the pericentre to the apocentre, showing the orbital eccentricity.

Themisto orbits Jupiter at an average distance of 7.4 million km in 130 days, at an inclination of about 45° to the ecliptic, in a prograde direction and with an eccentricity of 0.252. Its orbit is continuously changing due to solar and planetary perturbations.

This means that Themisto has the shortest orbital period of all irregular moons, apart from Triton.

Themisto's orbit is unusual: unlike most of Jupiter's moons, which orbit in distinct groups, Themisto orbits alone. The moon is located midway between the Galilean moons and the first group of prograde irregular moons, the Himalia group.

== Physical characteristics ==
Themisto is about 9 km (5.6 mi) in diameter (assuming an albedo of 0.04). While its true albedo could not be measured by NEOWISE due to poor timing of observations, It is known that Themisto is colored red in the visible spectrum. (B−V=0.83, V−R=0.46, and V−I=0.94) similar to D-type asteroids.

== Origin ==
Themisto probably did not form near Jupiter but was captured by Jupiter later. Themisto is probably the remnant of a broken, captured heliocentric asteroid.
