= S/2023 U 1 =

Irregular moon of Uranus

- Discovery photograph of S/2023 U 1 by the Magellan Telescope on 4 November 2023

Discovery
- Discovered by: Scott S. Sheppard
- Discovery site: Las Campanas Obs.
- Discovery date: 4 November 2023

Orbital characteristics
- Epoch 1 January 2020 (JD 2458849.5)
- Observation arc: 2.26 yr (826 d)
- Earliest precovery date: 8 September 2021
- Satellite of: Uranus
- Group: Caliban group

Proper orbital elements
- Proper semi-major axis: 7,976,600 km (0.053320 AU)
- Proper eccentricity: 0.250
- Proper inclination: 143.9° (to ecliptic)
- Proper orbital period: 1.86 years (681 d)
- Precession of perihelion long.: 255.228642 arcsec / yr
- Precession of asc. node: 258.065338 arcsec / yr

Physical characteristics
- Mean diameter: 8–12 km (Note: The diameter (in km) is calculated from absolute magnitude (H) and geometric albedo (p) according to the formula $D = \frac{1329}{\sqrt{p}} \times 10^{-0.2H}$. Given H = 13.7 and assuming an albedo range of 0.04–0.10, the diameter range is 8–12 km.); 8 km
- Apparent magnitude: 26.7 (average)
- Absolute magnitude (H): 13.7

S/2023 U 1 is a small and distant irregular moon of Uranus, with a diameter of around 8–12 km (5–7 mi). It was discovered on 4 November 2023 by Scott S. Sheppard using the 6.5-meter Magellan–Baade Telescope at Las Campanas Observatory, Chile, and later announced on 23 February 2024. It orbits Uranus in the retrograde direction at an average distance of about 8 million km (5 million mi) and takes almost two Earth years to complete one orbit.

== Discovery ==
S/2023 U 1 was discovered on 4 November 2023 by Scott S. Sheppard during his search for Uranian irregular moons with the 6.5-m Magellan–Baade Telescope at Las Campanas Observatory, Chile. Sheppard was able to detect this faint moon through the shift-and-add technique, in which he took many long-exposure telescope images, aligned and shifted them to follow Uranus's motion, and then added them together to create a single deep image that would show Uranian moons as points of light against trailed background stars and galaxies. Applying the shift-and-add technique to very large aperture telescopes like Magellan enabled Sheppard to probe deeper than previous Uranian irregular moon surveys.

To plan follow-up observations of S/2023 U 1, Sheppard collaborated with Marina Brozović and Robert Jacobson to calculate predictions for the moon's orbit and positions on other dates. Sheppard observed S/2023 U 1 with the Magellan Telescope on 6 and 13 December 2023, and was able to trace the moon back to his earlier observations on 8 September and 2 December 2021. S/2023 U 1 was confirmed and announced by the Minor Planet Center on 23 February 2024, bringing Uranus's number of known moons from 27 to 28. It is the first Uranian moon discovered in over 20 years since the discovery of Margaret in 2003.

== Orbit ==
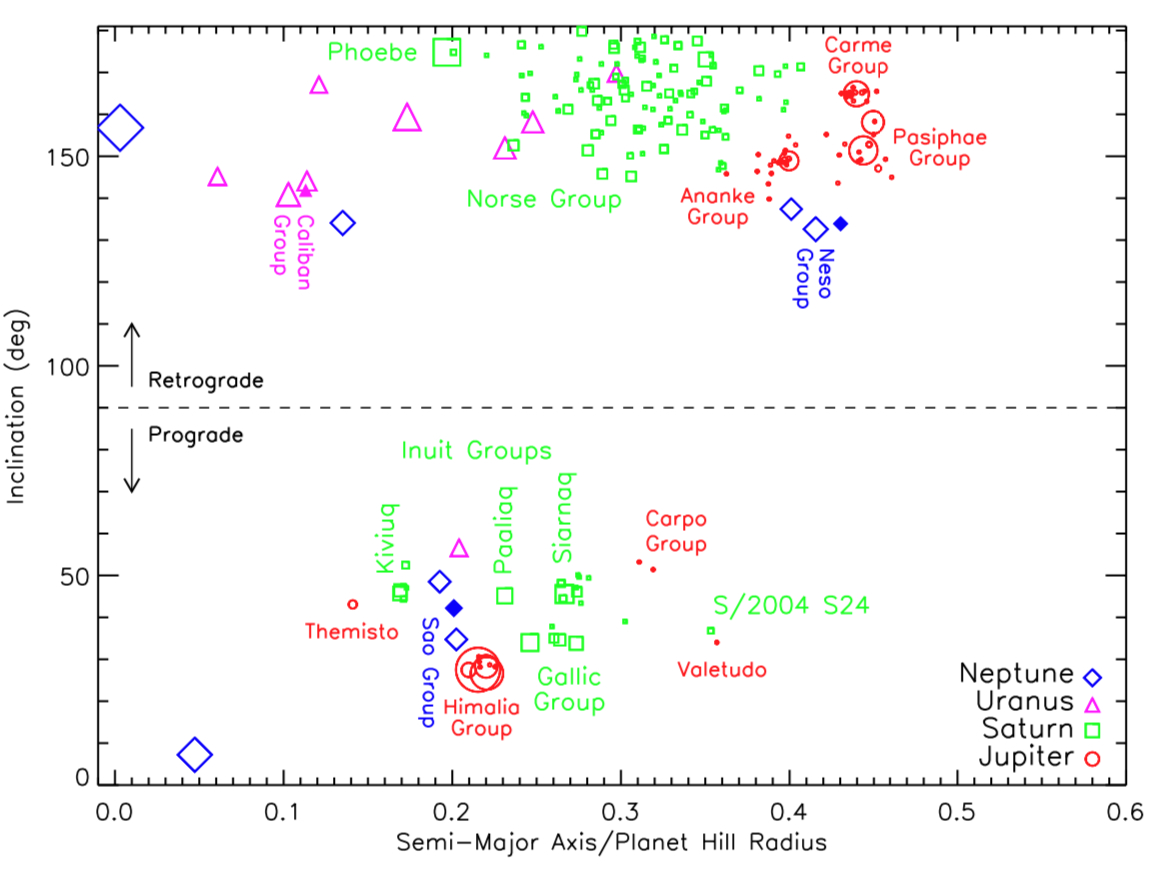
Irregular satellites of Jupiter (red circles), Saturn (green squares), Uranus (magenta triangles) and Neptune (blue diamonds; including Triton at the top left), plotted by distance from their planet (semi-major axis) in the horizontal axis and orbital inclination in the vertical axis. The semi-major axis values are expressed as a fraction of the planet's Hill sphere's radius, while the inclination is expressed in degrees from the ecliptic. The relative sizes of moons are indicated by the size of their symbols, and the Caliban group of Uranian moons is labeled. Data as of February 2024.

S/2023 U 1 is an irregular moon of Uranus, since it has a distant and highly elliptical and inclined orbit. Irregular moons are loosely bound by Uranus's gravity because of their great distance from the planet, so their orbits are frequently perturbed by the gravity of the Sun and other planets. This results in significant changes in the orbits of irregular moons over short periods of time, so a simple Keplerian elliptical orbit cannot accurately describe the long-term orbital motions of irregular moons. Instead, proper or mean orbital elements are used to describe the long-term orbits of irregular moons more accurately, since these are calculated by averaging out the perturbed orbit over a long period of time.

Over an 800-year time span from 1600 to 2400, S/2023 U 1's average semi-major axis or orbital distance from Uranus is 7.98 million km (4.96 million mi; 0.0533 AU), with an average orbital period of 1.86 years (681 d). S/2023 U 1 has an average orbital eccentricity of 0.25 and an average inclination of 144° with respect to the ecliptic, or the plane of Earth's orbit. Since S/2023 U 1's orbital inclination is greater than 90°, the moon has a retrograde orbit, meaning it orbits in the opposite direction of Uranus' orbit around the Sun. Due to perturbations, S/2023 U 1's orbital elements fluctuate over time: its semi-major axis can range from 7.97 to 7.98 million km (4.95 to 4.96 million mi), eccentricity from 0.14 to 0.29, and inclination from 141° to 144°. S/2023 U 1's orbit exhibits nodal precession with an average period of about 5,000 Earth years and apsidal precession with an average period of about 5,100 Earth years.

S/2023 U 1 is part of the Caliban group, a cluster of retrograde irregular moons of Uranus that includes Stephano and the group's namesake Caliban. The moons of the Caliban group have orbital elements that are clustered with semi-major axes between 7–8 million km (4.3–5.0 million mi), eccentricities between 0.16 and 0.23, and inclinations between 141° and 144°. Like all other irregular moon groups, the Caliban group is thought to have formed from the destruction of a larger captured moon of Uranus due to asteroid and comet impacts, which left many fragments in similar orbits around Uranus.

== Physical characteristics ==
S/2023 U 1 is extremely faint with an average apparent magnitude of 26.7, so it could only be observed with long-exposure imaging by large-aperture telescopes like the Magellan Telescope. Nothing is known about S/2023 U 1's physical properties other than its absolute magnitude of 13.7, which can be used to estimate the moon's diameter. Assuming a geometric albedo range of 0.04–0.10 that is typical for most irregular moons, S/2023 U 1 has a diameter between 8–12 km (5–7 mi), with Sheppard estimating the diameter to be 8 km (5.0 mi). S/2023 U 1 is tied with Uranus XXVIII as the smallest known moon of Uranus as of 2025.
