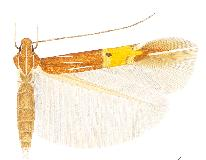

Scientific classification
- Kingdom: Animalia
- Phylum: Arthropoda
- Clade: Pancrustacea
- Class: Insecta
- Order: Lepidoptera
- Family: Cosmopterigidae
- Genus: Cosmopterix
- Species: C. themisto

Binomial name
- Cosmopterix themisto Koster, 2010

= Cosmopterix themisto =

Species of moth

Cosmopterix themisto is a moth of the family Cosmopterigidae. It is known from Mato Grosso do Sul, Brazil.

Adults have been recorded in August.

== Description ==
Male. Forewing length 3.9 mm. Head: frons shining white, vertex and neck tufts shining ochreous-brown, laterally and medially lined white, collar ochreous-brown; labial palpus first segment very short, white, second segment four-fifths of the length of third, greyish brown with white longitudinal lines laterally and ventrally, third segment white, lined brown laterally, scape dorsally dark brown with a white anterior line, ochreous-white ventrally, antenna shining dark brown with a white interrupted line from base to beyond one-half with a short section uninterrupted at base, followed towards apex by a dark brown section of approximately fifteen segments, five white, one dark brown, three white and one dark brown segment at apex. Thorax and tegulae ochreous-brown, thorax with white median line, tegulae lined white inwardly. Legs: ochreous-grey, foreleg with a white line on tibia and tarsal segments one to three and five, tibia of midleg with white oblique basal and medial lines and a white apical ring, tarsal segments ochreous, segments three and four more grey, tibia of hindleg as midleg, tarsal segments one to three with indistinct ochreous apical rings, segments four and five entirely ochreous, spurs ochreous on outside, paler on inside. Forewing ochreous-brown, four white lines in the basal area, a subcostal from one-eighth to one-quarter, bending slightly from costa distally, a slightly oblique medial above fold, from one-sixth to one-third, a subdorsal just beyond the start of the medial almost to the transverse fascia, a dorsal opposite to the subcostal, a broad yellow transverse fascia beyond the middle, slightly narrowed towards dorsum with a short apical protrusion, bordered at the inner edge by a pale golden metallic fascia, narrowed towards costa, not reaching it and with a subcostal patch of blackish brown scales on the outside, bordered at the outer edge by two pale golden metallic costal and dorsal spots, the dorsal spot twice as large as the costal and more towards base, a white costal streak beyond outer costal spot, a white apical line to apex from beyond the apical protrusion, cilia ochreous-brown, ochreous-grey towards dorsum. Hindwing shining pale ochreous-grey, cilia ochreous-grey. Underside: forewing shining pale greyish ochreous, the white costal streak and the apical line in the cilia at apex indistinctly visible, hindwing shining pale grey. Abdomen dorsally shining ochreous-grey, ventrally shining pale grey, segments broadly banded shining white posteriorly, anal tuft white.

== Etymology ==
The species is named after Themisto, a moon of Jupiter. To be treated as a noun in apposition.
