= Stephano (moon) =

Irregular moon of Uranus

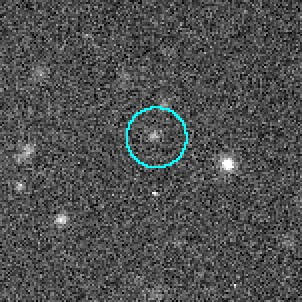
- Discovery image of Stephano (encircled)

Discovery
- Discovered by: John J. Kavelaars; Brett J. Gladman; Matthew J. Holman; Jean-Marc Petit; Hans Scholl
- Discovery date: July 18, 1999

Designations
- Designation: Uranus XX
- Pronunciation: /ˈstɛfənoʊ/ STEF-ən-oh
- Adjectives: Stephanonian /ˌstɛfəˈnoʊniən/ STEF-ə-NOH-nee-ən

Orbital characteristics
- Mean orbit radius: 7 951 400 km
- Eccentricity: 0.235
- Orbital period (sidereal): 677 d
- Inclination: 143.6° (to the ecliptic)
- Satellite of: Uranus
- Group: Caliban group

Physical characteristics
- Mean diameter: 32 km (estimate)
- Albedo: 0.04 (assumed)
- Spectral type: B–V = 0.97 ± 0.07, V–R = 0.66 ± 0.05
- Absolute magnitude (H): 11.6

Stephano, also known as Uranus XX and previously as S/1999 U 2, is an irregular moon of Uranus. It was discovered on 18 July 1999 by Brett J. Gladman et al. and it was named after the drunken butler in William Shakespeare's play The Tempest. Stephano orbits Uranus at an average distance of about 8 million km (5.0 million mi) and takes about 677 Earth days (1.8 Earth years) to complete one orbit. It is a member of the Caliban group, the first identified group of irregular Uranian moons that share similar orbital characteristics. Stephano is estimated to have a diameter of 32 km (20 mi), though most of its physical properties are unknown.

== Discovery and naming ==
Stephano was discovered on 18 July 1999, together with Prospero and Setebos, by Brett J. Gladman et al.

Animation of discovery images taken by the CFHT in July 1999

When the discovery of Stephano was announced, it was given the temporary provisional designation S/1999 U 2 by the Minor Planet Center. It was later named and given the Roman numeral designation Uranus XX by the International Astronomical Union's Working Group for Planetary System Nomenclature on 21 August 2000.

The moon was named after the drunken butler in William Shakespeare's play The Tempest.

== Orbit ==
Animation of several irregular moons' orbits around Uranus, including that of Stephano's. Uranus · Sycorax · Francisco · Caliban · Stephano · Trinculo

Stephano orbits Uranus at a mean distance of approximately 8 million km and completes one revolution in about 677 days. Its orbit is retrograde, moderately inclined with an inclination of approximately 144° and eccentricity of 0.200. Its orbital elements are subject to continuous variations caused by solar and planetary perturbations.

It is a member of the Caliban group, which orbits Uranus at orbital distances between 7–8 million km (4,3–4.9 million mi) and inclinations between 141–144°.

== Physical characteristics ==
Very little is known about its physical properties. Assuming Stephano has a low albedo of 0.04 like other Uranian irregular moons, its brightness suggests a diameter of about 32 km (20 mi).

Stephano appears reddish in visible light (colour indices B–V = 0.97 ± 0.07, V–R = 0.66 ± 0.05 and is nearly as red as many trans-Neptunian objects. It may even be redder than Caliban and Sycorax; however, additional observations are required to confirm this.

== Origin ==
Stephano probably did not form near Uranus but was captured by Uranus later. It is a member of the Caliban group, whose members—including Stephano—are thought to be fragments of an earlier parent body that was shattered in a collision, making them a collisional family.

== Exploration ==
Stephano has not been imaged up close by a space probe. All Uranian irregular moons including Stephano are planned to be distant observation targets for the proposed Uranus Orbiter and Probe (UOP), which will measure the Uranian irregular moons' rotation periods and shapes by watching their brightness change over time. The UOP may not be able to do a close flyby of Stephano because the moon does not orbit near the ecliptic plane.

== See also ==
- Moons of Uranus
- Other Uranian irregular moons discovered in 1999:
  - Prospero
  - Setebos
- Irregular satellites
