= Icarus (journal) =

ICARUS
- Discipline: Planetary science
- Language: English
- Edited by: Rosaly Lopes

Publication details
- History: 1962–present
- Publisher: Elsevier (United States)
- Frequency: Monthly
- Impact factor: 3.508 (2020)

Standard abbreviations
- ISO 4: ICARUS

Indexing
- ISSN: 0019-1035
- OCLC no.: 1752499

Links
- Journal homepage

ICARUS is a scientific journal dedicated to the field of planetary science. It is officially endorsed by the American Astronomical Society's Division for Planetary Sciences (DPS). The journal contains articles discussing the results of new research on astronomy, geology, meteorology, physics, chemistry, biology, and other scientific aspects of the Solar System or extrasolar systems.

The journal was founded in 1962, and became affiliated with the DPS in 1974. Its original owner and publisher was Academic Press, which was purchased by Elsevier in 2000.

List of ICARUS Editors
Years	Editor(s)
1962–1968	Albert G. Wilson and Zdeněk Kopal
1968–1979	Carl Sagan
1980–1997	Joseph A. Burns
1998–2017	Philip D. Nicholson
2017–2020	Rosaly Lopes
2021–present	Alessandro Morbidelli

The journal is named for the mythical Icarus, and the frontispiece of every issue contains an extended quotation from Sir Arthur Eddington equating Icarus' adventurousness with the scientific investigator who "strains his theories to the breaking-point till the weak joints gape."

== Abstracting and indexing ==
This journal is indexed by the following services:

- Science Citation Index
- Current Contents /Physical, Chemical & Earth Sciences
- Computer & control abstracts
- Electrical & electronics abstracts
- Physics abstracts. Science abstracts. Series A
- GeoRef
- Chemical Abstracts Service
- International aerospace abstracts
- Energy research abstracts
