= Caliban (moon) =

Irregular moon of Uranus

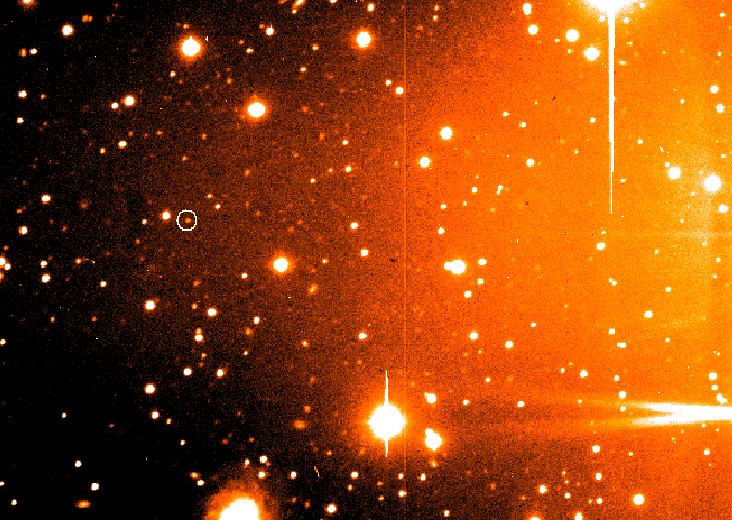
- Discovery image of Caliban taken by the Hale Telescope in September 1997

Discovery
- Discovered by: Philip D. Nicholson; Brett J. Gladman; Joseph A. Burns; John J. Kavelaars
- Discovery site: Hale Telescope at Palomar Obs.
- Discovery date: 6 September 1997

Designations
- Designation: Uranus XVI
- Pronunciation: /ˈkæləbæn/
- Named after: Caliban
- Alternative names: S/1997 U 1
- Adjectives: Calibanian /kæləˈbeɪniən/

Orbital characteristics
- Epoch 27 June 2015 (JD 2457200.5)
- Observation arc: 17.96 yr (6,559 d)
- Semi-major axis: 7,163,810 km (0.0478871 AU)
- Eccentricity: 0.0771431
- Orbital period (sidereal): 1.59 yr (579.26 d)
- Mean anomaly: 294.66253°
- Mean motion: 0° 37^{m} 17.345^{s} / day
- Inclination: 139.90814° (to the ecliptic); 140.878° (to local Laplace plane)
- Longitude of ascending node: 175.21248°
- Argument of perihelion: 342.53671°
- Satellite of: Uranus
- Group: Caliban group

Physical characteristics
- Mean diameter: 42+20 −12 km
- Mass: ~2.5×10^{17} kg (estimate)
- Mean density: ~1.3 g/cm^{3} (assumed)
- Synodic rotation period: 9.948±0.019 hr (double-peaked); 2.66±0.04 hr (single-peaked)
- Albedo: 0.22+0.20 −0.12
- Temperature: ~65 K (mean estimate)
- Apparent magnitude: 22.0 (V)
- Absolute magnitude (H): 9.160±0.016; 9.0

Caliban /ˈkælɪbæn/ is the second-largest irregular satellite of Uranus. It was discovered on 6 September 1997 by Brett J. Gladman, Philip D. Nicholson, Joseph A. Burns, and John J. Kavelaars using the 200-inch Hale Telescope together with Sycorax and given the temporary designation S/1997 U 1.

== Name and designation ==
The moon is designated Uranus XVI, it was named after the monster character in William Shakespeare's play The Tempest.

== Orbit ==
Animation of Caliban's orbit around Uranus. Uranus · Sycorax · Francisco · Caliban · Stephano · Trinculo

Caliban follows a distant orbit, more than 10 times further from Uranus than Oberon, the outermost regular moon. Its orbit is retrograde, moderately inclined and slightly eccentric. The orbital parameters suggest that it may belong to the same dynamic cluster as Stephano and Francisco, suggesting a common origin.

Retrograde irregular satellites of Uranus

The diagram illustrates the orbital parameters of the retrograde irregular satellites of Uranus (in polar co-ordinates) with the eccentricity of the orbits represented by the segments extending from the pericentre to the apocentre.

== Physical characteristics ==
Based on a single measurement point, Caliban's diameter is estimated to be around 42 km (26 mi), based on thermal measuring by the Herschel Space Observatory. Its albedo is estimated at around 0.22, which is unusually high compared to those of other Uranian irregular satellites. Neptune's largest irregular satellite, Nereid, has a similarly high albedo as Caliban. However, an alternate solution with a diameter of 50 km and albedo of 0.15 was also found to be equally possible.

Somewhat inconsistent reports put Caliban in the light-red category (B–V = 0.83 V–R = 0.52, B–V = 0.84 ± 0.03 V–R = 0.57 ± 0.03), redder than Himalia but still less red than most Kuiper belt objects. Caliban may be slightly redder than Sycorax. It also absorbs light at 0.7 μm, and one group of astronomers think this may be a result of liquid water that modified the surface.

Measurements of Caliban's light curve by the Kepler space telescope indicate that its rotation period is about 9.9 hours.

== Origin ==
Caliban is hypothesized to be a captured object: it did not form in the accretionary disk that existed around Uranus just after its formation. The exact capture mechanism is not known, but capturing a moon requires the dissipation of energy. The possible capture processes include: gas drag in the protoplanetary disk, many body interactions and the capture during the fast growth of Uranus's mass (so-called "pull-down").

== See also ==
- Moons of Uranus
