= Valetudo =

Valetudo may refer to:

- The Roman name for the Greek goddess Hygieia
- Valetudo (moon), a moon of the planet Jupiter, also known as Jupiter LXII

== See also ==
- Vale tudo, a Brazilian full-contact combat event
- Vale Tudo Japan, an annual mixed martial arts competition held in Japan
- Vale Tudo (TV series), a 1988 Brazilian telenovela
- Vale Tudo (2025 TV series), a remake of the 1988 Brazilian telenovela
