= Joseph A. Burns =

American academic (1941–2025)

Joseph Burns (March 22, 1941 – February 26, 2025) was a professor at Cornell University with a dual appointment in the Sibley School of Mechanical and Aerospace Engineering (MAE) and the Astronomy department. His primary area of research was dynamics in planetary sciences.

== Professional biography ==
Burns received his Ph.D. from Cornell in 1966. He held the position of Vice Provost of Research and Engineering from 2003 to 2008. Burns was the editor of the planetary science journal Icarus from 1980 to 1997. He has edited two books, Planetary Satellites (1977) and Satellites (1986). He was the Vice President of the American Astronomical Society, as well as having chaired its Division for Planetary Sciences (DPS) and Division on Dynamical Astronomy (DDA). He is the President of the IAU's commission on celestial mechanics and dynamical astronomy. Burns is a fellow of the AGU and the AAAS, a member of the International Academy of Astronautics, and a foreign member of the Russian Academy of Sciences. He received the DPS's Masursky Award in 1994 for meritorious service to planetary science, and received the DDA's Brouwer Award in 2013.

Burns is best known for his theoretical work on dynamical astronomy in the Solar System. In 1979 Burns definitively explained the effect of radiation forces on small particles in the Solar System. In 1998, Burns, Gladman, Nicholson, and Kavelaars co-discovered Caliban and Sycorax, two moons of Uranus. He was a member of the Galileo Imaging Team and the Cassini Imaging Team.

His former graduate students include Mark Showalter and Brett J. Gladman.

== Awards and honors ==
The Themistian asteroid 2708 Burns, discovered by Edward Bowell in 1981, was named in his honor. The official naming citation was published by the Minor Planet Center on 4 August 1982 (M.P.C. 7158).

== See also ==
- List of minor planet discoverers § J. A. Burns
