= Prospero (moon) =

Irregular moon of Uranus

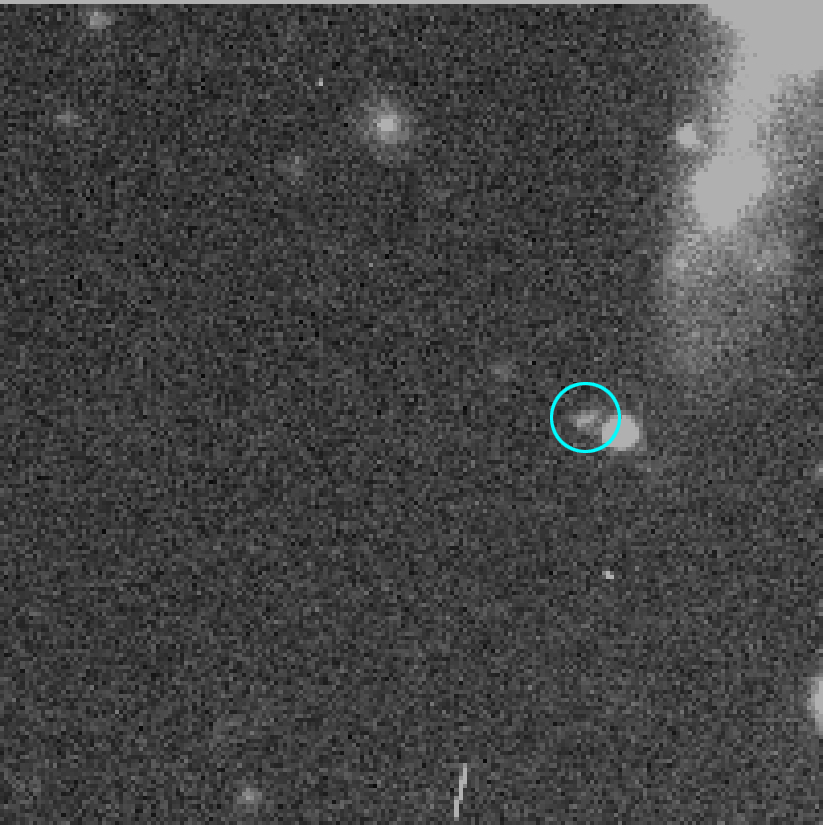
- Discovery image of Prospero, taken by the CFHT in July 1999

Discovery
- Discovered by: John J. Kavelaars; Brett J. Gladman; Matthew J. Holman; Jean-Marc Petit; Hans Scholl
- Discovery date: 18 July 1999

Designations
- Designation: Uranus XVIII
- Pronunciation: /ˈprɒspɛroʊ/
- Adjectives: Prosperonian /prɒspɛˈroʊniən/, Prosperian /prɒˈspɪəriən/

Orbital characteristics
- Mean orbit radius: 16,256,000 km
- Eccentricity: 0.4448
- Orbital period (sidereal): 1978.29 d
- Inclination: 152° (to the ecliptic)
- Satellite of: Uranus

Physical characteristics
- Mean diameter: 50 km
- Synodic rotation period: 14.29±0.183 h (double-peak); 7.145±0.092 h (single-peak)
- Albedo: 0.04 (Assumed)
- Apparent magnitude: 23.2
- Absolute magnitude (H): 10.6

Prospero, also known as Uranus XVIII and previously as S/1999 U 3, is an irregular moon of Uranus. It was discovered on 18 July 1999 by Matthew Holman and his team and it was named after the sorcerer Prospero in William Shakespeare's play The Tempest. Prospero orbits Uranus at an average distance of 16.2 million km (10.1 million mi) and takes about 1978 Earth days (5.4 Earth years) to complete one orbit. Prospero is estimated to be about 50 km (31 mi) in diameter and although many of its physical properties are still unknown, telescope observations suggest that it has an elongated shape and a rotation period of either 7 or 14 hours.

Animation of discovery images to show Prospero's motion among background stars

== Discovery and naming ==
Prospero was discovered on 18 July 1999, together with Setebos and Stephano, by Matthew Holman and his team.

When the discovery of Prospero was announced, it was given the temporary provisional designation S/1999 U 3 by the Minor Planet Center. It was later named and given the Roman numeral designation Uranus XVIII by the International Astronomical Union's Working Group for Planetary System Nomenclature on 21 August 2000. The moon was named after the sorcerer Prospero in William Shakespeare's play The Tempest.

== Orbit ==
Prospero orbits Uranus at a mean distance of approximately 16,256,000 km and completes one revolution in about 1978 days. Its orbit is highly inclined, with an inclination of approximately 152° to the ecliptic, is retrograde, and has a high orbital eccentricity of 0.445. Its orbital elements are subject to continuous variations caused by solar and planetary perturbations.

Prospero is not known to be part of a collisional family or group.

The similar orbital characteristics and colors of Prospero and Setebos suggest that they may share a common origin. However, further observations are needed to confirm this hypothesis.

== Physical characteristics ==
Very little is known about its physical properties. Assuming Prospero has a low albedo of 0.04 like other Uranian irregular moons, its brightness suggests a diameter of about 50 km (31 mi).

The satellite appears neutral (grey) in visible light (colour indices B−V=0.80, R−V=0.39) similar to Setebos.

Prospero's brightness varies periodically as it rotates, which indicates it has an elongated shape. Kepler observations in 2017 measured a brightness variation of 0.41 magnitudes, implying an equatorial semi-axis ratio (a/b) not less than 1.4. The rotation period of Prospero is ambiguous, as it depends on whether its light curve is single-peaked or double-peaked. If Propsero's light curve is single-peaked, its rotation period would be 7.145±0.092 hours. If its light curve is double-peaked, then its rotation period would be 14.29±0.183 hours, twice the single-peak period.

== Origin ==
Prospero probably did not form near Uranus but was captured by Uranus later. Its orbital parameters suggest that it may belong to the same dynamic cluster as Sycorax and Setebos, suggesting a common origin. However, Sycorax is considerably redder than the other moons, which are predominantly gray.

== Exploration ==
Prospero has not been imaged up close by a space probe. All Uranian irregular moons including Prospero are planned to be distant observation targets for the proposed Uranus Orbiter and Probe (UOP), which will measure the Uranian irregular moons' rotation periods and shapes by watching their brightness change over time. The UOP may not be able to do a close flyby of Prospero because the moon does not orbit near the ecliptic plane.

== See also ==
- Moons of Uranus
- Other Uranian irregular moons discovered in 1999:
  - Setebos
  - Stephano
- Irregular satellites
