= 2708 Burns =

Themistian asteroid

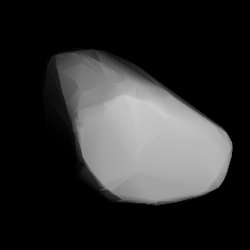
- Shape model of Burns from its lightcurve

Discovery
- Discovered by: E. Bowell
- Discovery site: Anderson Mesa Stn.
- Discovery date: 24 November 1981

Designations
- Named after: Joseph A. Burns (American astronomer)
- Alternative designations: 1981 WT · 1951 GG; 1961 DN · 1965 YB; 1978 EL_{3} · A912 AE
- Minor planet category: main-belt · (outer); Themis

Orbital characteristics
- Epoch 23 March 2018 (JD 2458200.5)
- Uncertainty parameter 0
- Observation arc: 66.42 yr (24,261 d)
- Aphelion: 3.6268 AU
- Perihelion: 2.5337 AU
- Semi-major axis: 3.0803 AU
- Eccentricity: 0.1774
- Orbital period (sidereal): 5.41 yr (1,975 d)
- Mean anomaly: 227.73°
- Mean motion: 0° 10^{m} 56.28^{s} / day
- Inclination: 2.7828°
- Longitude of ascending node: 111.65°
- Argument of perihelion: 331.24°

Physical characteristics
- Mean diameter: 13.63±3.61 km 20.085±0.110 km 20.263±0.244 km 20.4±2.0 km 22±2 km
- Synodic rotation period: 5.315±0.003 h
- Geometric albedo: 0.051±0.003; 0.06±0.01; 0.07±0.01; 0.0836±0.0151; 0.12±0.11
- Spectral type: SMASS = B
- Absolute magnitude (H): 11.8 · 12.00; 12.1

2708 Burns (prov. designation: 1981 WT) is a carbonaceous Themistian asteroid from the outer regions of the asteroid belt, approximately 19 kilometers (12 miles) in diameter. It was discovered on 24 November 1981, by American astronomer Edward Bowell at the Anderson Mesa Station near Flagstaff, Arizona, in the United States. It was named after American planetary scientist Joseph A. Burns. The likely elongated B-type asteroid has a rotation period of 5.3 hours.

== Orbit and classification ==
Burns is a Themistian asteroid that belongs to the Themis family (602), a very large family of carbonaceous asteroids, named after 24 Themis. It orbits the Sun in the outer main-belt at a distance of 2.5–3.6 AU once every 5 years and 5 months (1,975 days; semi-major axis of 3.08 AU). Its orbit has an eccentricity of 0.18 and an inclination of 3° with respect to the ecliptic.

The asteroid was first observed as A912 AE at Winchester Observatory (799) in January 1912. The body's observation arc begins with a precovery taken at Goethe Link Observatory in February 1950, more than 31 years prior to its official discovery observation at Anderson Mesa.

== Naming ==
This minor planet was named after Joseph A. Burns (born 1941), American planetary scientist and astronomer at Cornell University in New York, and a co-discoverer of the trans-Neptunian object (385191) at Palomar in 1997. The official naming citation was published by the Minor Planet Center on 4 August 1982 (M.P.C. 7158).

== Physical characteristics ==
In the SMASS classification, Burns is a carbonaceous B-type, which are somewhat brighter than the common C-type asteroids.

=== Rotation period ===
In March 2010, a rotational lightcurve of Burns was obtained from photometric observations by French amateur astronomer René Roy. Lightcurve analysis gave a well-defined rotation period of 5.315 hours with a brightness amplitude of 0.52 magnitude, indicative for a non-spherical shape (U=3).

=== Diameter and albedo ===
According to the survey carried out by the NEOWISE mission of NASA's Wide-field Infrared Survey Explorer, Burns measures between 13.63 and 22 kilometers in diameter and its surface has an albedo between 0.051 and 0.12. The Collaborative Asteroid Lightcurve Link assumes an albedo of 0.08 and calculates a diameter of 17.86 kilometers based on an absolute magnitude of 12.1.
