= Brett J. Gladman =

Canadian astronomer (born 1966)

Minor planets discovered: 18
see § List of discovered minor planets

Brett James Gladman (born April 19, 1966) is a Canadian astronomer and a full professor at the University of British Columbia's Department of Physics and Astronomy in Vancouver, British Columbia. He holds the Canada Research Chair in planetary astronomy. He does both theoretical work (large-scale numerical simulations of planetary dynamics) and observational optical astronomy (being a discoverer of many planetary moons and minor planets).

== Career ==
Gladman is best known for his work in dynamical astronomy in the Solar System. He has studied the transport of meteorites between planets, the delivery of meteoroids from the main asteroid belt, and the possibility of the transport of life via this mechanism, known as panspermia. He also studies planet formation, especially the puzzle of how the giant planets came to be.

He is discoverer or co-discoverer of many astronomical bodies in the Solar System, asteroids, Kuiper Belt comets, and many moons of the giant planets:

- Uranus: Caliban, Sycorax, Prospero, Setebos, Stephano, and Ferdinand
- Saturn: A dozen satellites in several groups, each named after a theme of Canadian Inuit gods, French deities, and Norse gods
- Neptune: The satellite Neso
- Jupiter: Discovery and co-discovery of 6 moons

Gladman is a member of the Canada–France Ecliptic Plane Survey (CFEPS), and the Outer Solar System Origins Survey (OSSOS) which has detected and tracked the world's largest sample of well-understood Kuiper belt comets, including unusual objects like 2004 XR190 ("Buffy") and 2008 KV42 ("Drac"), the first trans-Neptunian object on a retrograde orbit around the Sun.

== Honors and awards ==
Gladman was awarded the H. C. Urey Prize by the Division of Planetary Sciences of the American Astronomical Society in 2002. The main-belt asteroid 7638 Gladman is named in his honor. During 2008–2011 he served as member and chair of the Science Advisory Council of the Canada-France-Hawaii Telescope on Mauna Kea in Hawaii. He was awarded a Killam Research Fellowship in 2015.

== List of discovered minor planets ==
Partial listing only below; discoveries number in the many hundreds of asteroids and Kuiper Belt objects.

| (44594) 1999 OX3 | 21 July 1999 | list^{[A]}^{[B]}^{[C]} |
| (49673) 1999 RA_{215} | 13 September 1999 | list^{[D]}^{[E]} |
| (60620) 2000 FD_{8} | 27 March 2000 | list^{[A]}^{[C]}^{[B]} |
| (60621) 2000 FE8 | 27 March 2000 | list^{[A]}^{[C]}^{[B]} |
| (62608) 2000 SD_{332} | 23 September 2000 | list |
| (82053) 2000 SZ_{370} | 23 September 2000 | list^{[A]} |
| (118698) 2000 OY_{51} | 28 July 2000 | list |
| (182222) 2000 YU_{1} | 16 December 2000 | list^{[B]}^{[F]} |
| (182223) 2000 YC_{2} | 17 December 2000 | list^{[B]}^{[F]} |
| (182926) 2002 FU_{6} | 20 March 2002 | list^{[A]}^{[G]} |
| (200198) 1999 RE_{216} | 2 September 1999 | list |
| (385191) 1997 RT_{5} | 7 September 1997 | list^{[H]}^{[J]} |
| (385533) 2004 QD_{29} | 19 August 2004 | list |
| (418993) 2009 MS9 | 25 June 2009 | list^{[C]}^{[A]} |
| (422472) 2014 SZ_{319} | 23 March 2001 | list |

| (444025) 2004 HJ_{79} | 26 April 2004 | list |
| (468422) 2000 FA_{8} | 27 March 2000 | list^{[A]}^{[C]}^{[B]} |
| (469610) 2004 HF_{79} | 24 April 2004 | list |
| (506439) 2000 YB_{2} | 16 December 2000 | list^{[B]}^{[F]} |
Co-discovery made with:^{A} J. J. Kavelaars^{B} M. J. Holman^{C} J.-M. Petit^{D} D. Davis^{E} C. Neese^{F} T. Grav^{G} A. Doressoundiram^{H} P. Nicholson^{J} J. A. Burns

== See also ==
- List of minor planet discoverers § B. Gladman
