= Sycorax (moon) =

Irregular moon of Uranus

- One-hour timelapse of Sycorax moving in the sky, taken by the Canada–France–Hawaii Telescope on 24 August 2001

Discovery
- Discovered by: Philip D. Nicholson; Brett J. Gladman; Joseph A. Burns; JJ Kavelaars
- Discovery site: Hale Telescope at Palomar Obs.
- Discovery date: 6 September 1997

Designations
- Designation: Uranus XVII
- Pronunciation: /ˈsɪkɒræks/
- Named after: Sycorax
- Alternative names: S/1997 U 2
- Adjectives: Sycoraxian /sɪkɒˈræksiən/

Orbital characteristics
- Epoch 31 July 2016 (JD 2457600.5)
- Observation arc: 32.37 yr (11,815 d)
- Earliest precovery date: 2 June 1984
- Semi-major axis: 12,193,230 km (0.0815067 AU)
- Eccentricity: 0.4841889
- Orbital period (sidereal): 3.52 yr (1,286.28 d)
- Mean anomaly: 160.58731°
- Mean motion: 0° 16^{m} 47.56^{s} / day
- Inclination: 153.22796° (to the ecliptic); 159.403° (to local Laplace plane)
- Longitude of ascending node: 258.56478°
- Argument of perihelion: 16.29680°
- Satellite of: Uranus

Physical characteristics
- Mean diameter: 157+23 −15 km 165+36 −42 km
- Mass: ~2.5×10^{18} kg (estimate)
- Mean density: ~1.3 g/cm^{3} (assumed)
- Synodic rotation period: 6.9162±0.0013 hr (double-peaked); 3.6 hr (single-peaked)
- Albedo: 0.065+0.015 −0.011; 0.049+0.038 −0.017
- Temperature: ~65 K (mean estimate)
- Spectral type: B–V = 0.839 ± 0.014; V–R = 0.531 ± 0.005
- Apparent magnitude: 20.8 (V)
- Absolute magnitude (H): 7.5±0.04; 7.83±0.06

Sycorax (/ˈsɪkɒræks/; designated Uranus XVII or S/1997 U 2) is the largest irregular moon of Uranus, with a diameter of approximately 157 km. It was discovered on 6 September 1997 on the Hale Telescope in California. Sycorax's orbit is retrograde, irregular, and much more distant than that of Oberon, the furthest of Uranus's regular moons. It has been hypothesized that Sycorax is a captured object, as opposed to one that formed with Uranus.

== Discovery and naming ==
Sycorax was discovered by Brett J. Gladman, Philip D. Nicholson, Joseph A. Burns, and JJ Kavelaars using the 200-inch Hale Telescope, together with Caliban. At the time, it was given the temporary designation S/1997 U 2. Officially confirmed as Uranus XVII, it was named after Sycorax, Caliban's mother in William Shakespeare's play The Tempest. This follows the trend that all Uranian moons are named after Shakespearean characters or those from Alexander Pope's The Rape of the Lock. The name Sycorax was approved by the IAU no later than March 1999.

== Orbit ==
Animation of Sycorax's orbit around Uranus. Uranus · Sycorax · Francisco · Caliban · Stephano · Trinculo

Sycorax follows a distant orbit, more than 20 times further from Uranus than the furthest regular moon, Oberon. Its orbit is retrograde, moderately inclined and eccentric. The orbital parameters suggest that it may belong, together with Setebos and Prospero, to the same dynamic cluster, suggesting a common origin. However, Sycorax has a much redder color than the other moons, which tend to be gray in color.

== Physical characteristics ==
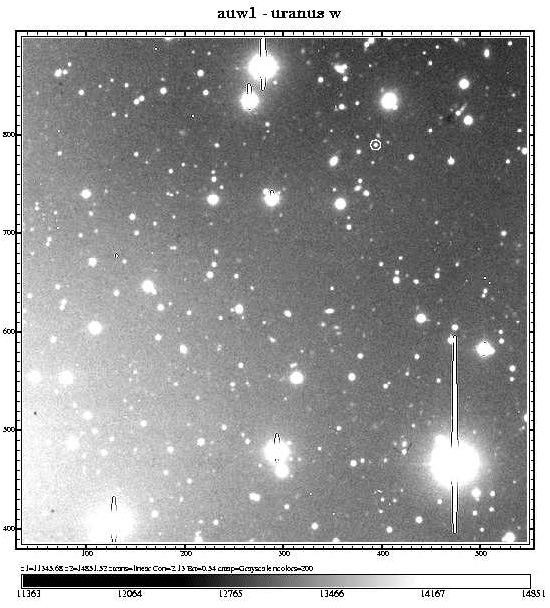
Full discovery image of Sycorax (circled), which is located at the top-right of the image

The diameter of Sycorax is estimated at 157 km, based on the thermal emission data from Herschel Space telescopes, making it the largest irregular satellite of Uranus, comparable in size with Puck and with Himalia, the biggest irregular satellite of Jupiter. At the same time, Sycorax is the seventh largest moon of Uranus.

The satellite appears light-red in the visible spectrum (colour indices B–V = 0.87 V–R = 0.44, B–V = 0.78 ± 0.02 V–R = 0.62 ± 0.01, B–V = 0.839 ± 0.014 V–R = 0.531 ± 0.005), redder than Himalia but still less red than most Kuiper belt objects. However, in the near infrared, the spectrum turns blue between 0.8 and 1.25 μm and finally becomes neutral at the longer wavelengths.

The rotation period of Sycorax is estimated at 6.9 hours. Rotation causes periodical variations of the visible magnitude with the amplitude of 0.12. The rotation axis of Sycorax is unknown, though measurements of its light curve suggest it is likely being viewed from Earth at a near equator-on configuration.

== Origin ==
It is hypothesized that Sycorax is a captured object; it did not form in the accretion disk which existed around Uranus just after its formation. No exact capture mechanism is known, but capturing a moon requires the dissipation of energy. Possible capture processes include gas drag in the protoplanetary disk and many-body interactions and capture during the fast growth of Uranus's mass (so-called pull-down).

== Exploration ==
Sycorax has not been imaged up close by a space probe. Since its discovery, observations have been limited to Earth-based telescopes.

== See also ==
- Moons of Uranus
- Irregular moons

== Bibliography ==
- Gladman, B. J.; Nicholson, P. D.; Burns, J. A.; Kavelaars, J. J.; Marsden, B. G.; Williams, G. V.; Offutt, W. B. (1998). "Discovery of two distant irregular moons of Uranus". Nature. 392 (6679): 897–899. Bibcode:1998Natur.392..897G. doi:10.1038/31890. S2CID 4315601.
- Grav, Tommy; Holman, Matthew J.; Fraser, Wesley C. (20 September 2004). "Photometry of Irregular Satellites of Uranus and Neptune". The Astrophysical Journal. 613 (1): L77–L80. arXiv:astro-ph/0405605. Bibcode:2004ApJ...613L..77G. doi:10.1086/424997. S2CID 15706906.
- Sheppard, S. S.; Jewitt, D.; Kleyna, J. (2005). "An Ultradeep Survey for Irregular Satellites of Uranus: Limits to Completeness". The Astronomical Journal. 129 (1): 518–525. arXiv:astro-ph/0410059. Bibcode:2005AJ....129..518S. doi:10.1086/426329. S2CID 18688556.
- Rettig, T. W.; Walsh, K.; Consolmagno, G. (December 2001). "Implied Evolutionary Differences of the Jovian Irregular Satellites from a BVR Color Survey". Icarus. 154 (2): 313–320. Bibcode:2001Icar..154..313R. doi:10.1006/icar.2001.6715.
