= Setebos (moon) =

Irregular moon of Uranus

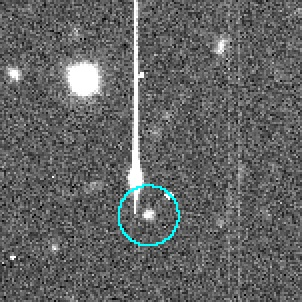
- Discovery image of Setebos (encircled)

Discovery
- Discovered by: John J. Kavelaars; Brett J. Gladman; Matthew J. Holman; Jean-Marc Petit; Hans Scholl
- Discovery date: July 18, 1999

Designations
- Designation: Uranus XIX
- Pronunciation: /ˈsɛtɛbʌs/, /-bɒs/
- Adjectives: Setebosian /ˌsɛtɛˈboʊsiən/

Orbital characteristics
- Mean orbit radius: 17,418,000 km
- Eccentricity: 0.5914
- Orbital period (sidereal): 2225.21 d
- Inclination: 158° (to the ecliptic)
- Satellite of: Uranus

Physical characteristics
- Mean diameter: 47 km
- Synodic rotation period: 4.255 ± 0.017 h
- Albedo: 0.04 (Assumed)
- Apparent magnitude: 23,3
- Absolute magnitude (H): 10,6

Setebos (/ˈsɛtɛbʌs/), also known as Uranus XIX, is one of the largest irregular satellites of Uranus.

Animation of discovery images taken in July 1999

== Discovery and naming ==
It was discovered on 18 July 1999 by John J. Kavelaars et al. and provisionally designated S/1999 U 1.

Confirmed as Uranus XIX, it is named after the god Setebos worshipped by Caliban and Sycorax in William Shakespeare's play The Tempest.

A crater on Umbriel is also named after Setebos, but with the spelling Setibos.

== Orbit ==
Setebos orbits Uranus at an average distance of 16,256,000 km, in 1978 days, at an inclination of about 152° to the ecliptic, in a retrograde direction and with a high eccentricity of 0.445. The orbital elements are continuously changing due to solar and planetary perturbations.

== Physical characteristics ==
Setebos's estimated diameter is 47 kilometers, assuming an albedo of 4%.

The satellite appears neutral (grey) in visible light (colour indices B−V=0.77, R−V=0.35), similar to Prospero.

Measurements of Setebos's light curve by the Kepler space telescope indicate that its rotation period is about 4 hours and 15.3 min. which makes it one of the fastest-rotating moons in the Solar System.

== Origin ==
Setebos probably did not form near Uranus but was captured by Uranus later. The orbital parameters suggest that it may belong to the same dynamic cluster as Sycorax and Prospero, suggesting a common origin. However, Sycorax has a much redder color than the other moons, which tend to be grey in color.

== Exploration ==
Setebos has not been imaged up close by a space probe. All Uranian irregular moons including Setebos are planned to be distant observation targets for the proposed Uranus Orbiter and Probe (UOP), which will measure the Uranian irregular moons' rotation periods and shapes by watching their brightness change over time. The UOP may not be able to do a close flyby of Setebos because the moon does not orbit near the ecliptic plane.

== See also ==
- Moons of Uranus
- Irregular satellites
