= Hans Scholl (astronomer) =

German astronomer (born 1942)

Minor planets discovered: 55
see § List of discovered minor planets

Hans Scholl (born 1942) is a German astronomer, who worked at the Astronomisches Rechen-Institut in Heidelberg, Germany, and at the Côte d'Azur Observatory in Nice, France. In 1999, he was part of a team that discovered three moons of Uranus: Prospero, Setebos and Stephano. He has also co-discovered 55 minor planets together with Italian astronomer Andrea Boattini at ESO's La Silla Observatory site in northern Chile during 2003–2005.

Scholl is known for his theoretical work on the orbits of minor planets. He has studied the orbital resonance of outer main-belt asteroids, as well as the orbits of 2062 Aten, a near-Earth object, and 2060 Chiron, a centaur and comet. His broad range of minor planet research included problems from mass determination to asteroid missions and from libration to depletion. He was honored by the outer main-belt asteroid 2959 Scholl, discovered by English–American astronomer Edward Bowell in 1983.

== List of discovered minor planets ==
List of minor planets discovered by Hans Scholl
Name	Discovery Date	Listing
117539 Celletti	17 February 2005	list^{[A]}
120040 Pagliarini	24 January 2003	list^{[A]}
(143398) 2003 BE_{34}	25 January 2003	list^{[A]}
147693 Piccioni	11 February 2005	list^{[A]}
154991 Vinciguerra	17 January 2005	list^{[A]}
(156785) 2003 BH_{3}	24 January 2003	list^{[A]}
158623 Perali	24 January 2003	list^{[A]}
167852 Maturana	17 February 2005	list^{[A]}
177659 Paolacel	9 February 2005	list^{[A]}
(180046) 2003 BB_{5}	24 January 2003	list^{[A]}
(180796) 2005 CB_{69}	14 February 2005	list^{[A]}
(183445) 2003 BE_{3}	24 January 2003	list^{[A]}
(184290) 2005 CV_{61}	9 February 2005	list^{[A]}
(202295) 2005 CL_{40}	9 February 2005	list^{[A]}
(202308) 2005 DN_{3}	18 February 2005	list^{[A]}
214180 Mabaglioni	9 February 2005	list^{[A]}
(223194) 2003 BP_{4}	24 January 2003	list^{[A]}
(242147) 2003 BH_{84}	25 January 2003	list^{[A]}
(242538) 2005 BW_{48}	17 January 2005	list^{[A]}
(245280) 2005 BK_{48}	17 January 2005	list^{[A]}
(253276) 2003 BO_{3}	23 January 2003	list^{[A]}
(253277) 2003 BL_{4}	25 January 2003	list^{[A]}
(254465) 2005 CC_{69}	9 February 2005	list^{[A]}
(254467) 2005 DJ_{2}	16 February 2005	list^{[A]}
(277038) 2005 CK_{39}	9 February 2005	list^{[A]}
(277046) 2005 DO_{3}	16 February 2005	list^{[A]}
(287483) 2003 BS_{5}	24 January 2003	list^{[A]}
(289396) 2005 CB_{41}	9 February 2005	list^{[A]}
(289417) 2005 DF	17 February 2005	list^{[A]}
(289418) 2005 DP_{3}	17 February 2005	list^{[A]}
(299072) 2005 DF_{3}	17 February 2005	list^{[A]}
(303470) 2005 CZ_{61}	13 February 2005	list^{[A]}
(306240) 2011 QV_{68}	9 February 2005	list^{[A]}
(312726) 2010 RW_{105}	23 January 2003	list^{[A]}
(313549) 2003 BD_{3}	24 January 2003	list^{[A]}
(313550) 2003 BT_{3}	23 January 2003	list^{[A]}
(323126) 2003 BU_{4}	24 January 2003	list^{[A]}
(334680) 2003 BF_{3}	24 January 2003	list^{[A]}
(338401) 2003 BZ_{4}	24 January 2003	list^{[A]}
(354607) 2005 CT_{40}	9 February 2005	list^{[A]}
(356789) 2011 UL_{313}	16 February 2005	list^{[A]}
(362475) 2010 SA_{18}	16 February 2005	list^{[A]}
(365948) 2012 AV_{22}	14 February 2005	list^{[A]}
(370849) 2005 CK_{40}	9 February 2005	list^{[A]}
(380416) 2003 BT_{4}	24 January 2003	list^{[A]}
(380657) 2005 DN_{1}	17 February 2005	list^{[A]}
(382262) 2012 TC_{114}	18 January 2005	list^{[A]}
(402221) 2005 CF_{39}	9 February 2005	list^{[A]}
(405190) 2003 BK_{4}	25 January 2003	list^{[A]}
(405191) 2003 BE_{5}	24 January 2003	list^{[A]}
(405514) 2005 CR_{40}	9 February 2005	list^{[A]}
(409383) 2005 DQ_{1}	17 February 2005	list^{[A]}
(427568) 2003 BG_{4}	23 January 2003	list^{[A]}
(455672) 2005 DE	18 February 2005	list^{[A]}
(455673) 2005 DG_{1}	17 February 2005	list^{[A]}
(497008) 2003 BG_{3}	24 January 2003	list^{[A]}
Co-discovery made with:^{A} A. Boattini

== See also ==
- List of minor planet discoverers § H. Scholl
