= Natural satellite =

Astronomical body that orbits a planet

The Moon orbiting around Earth (observed by the Deep Space Climate Observatory)

A natural satellite is, in the most common usage, an astronomical body that orbits a planet, dwarf planet, or small Solar System body (or sometimes another natural satellite). Natural satellites are colloquially referred to as moons, by analogy with the Moon, Earth's natural satellite. In English, the Moon with a capital M denotes Earth's satellite, while moon with a lowercase m is used generically for natural satellites.

In the Solar System, there are six planetary satellite systems, altogether comprising 456 natural satellites with confirmed orbits. Seven objects commonly considered dwarf planets by astronomers are also known to have natural satellites: Orcus, Pluto, Haumea, Quaoar, Makemake, Gonggong, and Eris. Including the aforementioned seven, there are 656 minor planets known or suspected to have natural satellites.

== Terminology ==
The first known natural satellite was the Moon, but it was considered a "planet" until Copernicus' introduction of De revolutionibus orbium coelestium in 1543. Until the discovery of the Galilean satellites in 1610 there was no opportunity for referring to such objects as a class. Galileo chose to refer to his discoveries as Planetæ ("planets"), but later discoverers chose other terms to distinguish them from the objects they orbited.

The first to use the term satellite to describe orbiting bodies was the German astronomer Johannes Kepler in his pamphlet Narratio de Observatis a se quatuor Iouis satellitibus erronibus ("Narration About Four Satellites of Jupiter Observed") in 1610. He derived the term from the Latin word satelles, meaning "guard", "attendant", or "companion", because the satellites accompanied their primary planet in their journey through the heavens.

The term satellite thus became the normal one for referring to an object orbiting a planet, as it avoided the ambiguity of "moon". In 1957, however, the launching of the artificial object Sputnik created a need for new terminology. The terms man-made satellite and artificial moon were very quickly abandoned in favor of the simpler satellite. As a consequence, the term has become linked with artificial objects flown in space.

Because of this shift in meaning, the term moon, which had continued to be used in a generic sense in works of popular science and fiction, has regained respectability and is now used interchangeably with natural satellite, even in scientific articles. When it is necessary to avoid both the ambiguity of confusion with Earth's natural satellite the Moon and the natural satellites of the other planets on the one hand, and artificial satellites on the other, the term natural satellite (using "natural" in a sense opposed to "artificial") is used. To further avoid ambiguity, the convention is to capitalize the word Moon when referring to Earth's natural satellite (a proper noun), but not when referring to other natural satellites (common nouns).

Many authors define "satellite" or "natural satellite" as orbiting some planet or minor planet, synonymous with "moon" – by such a definition all natural satellites are moons, but Earth and other planets are not satellites. A few recent authors define "moon" as "a satellite of a planet or minor planet", and "planet" as "a satellite of a star" – such authors consider Earth as a "natural satellite of the Sun".

=== Definition of a moon ===
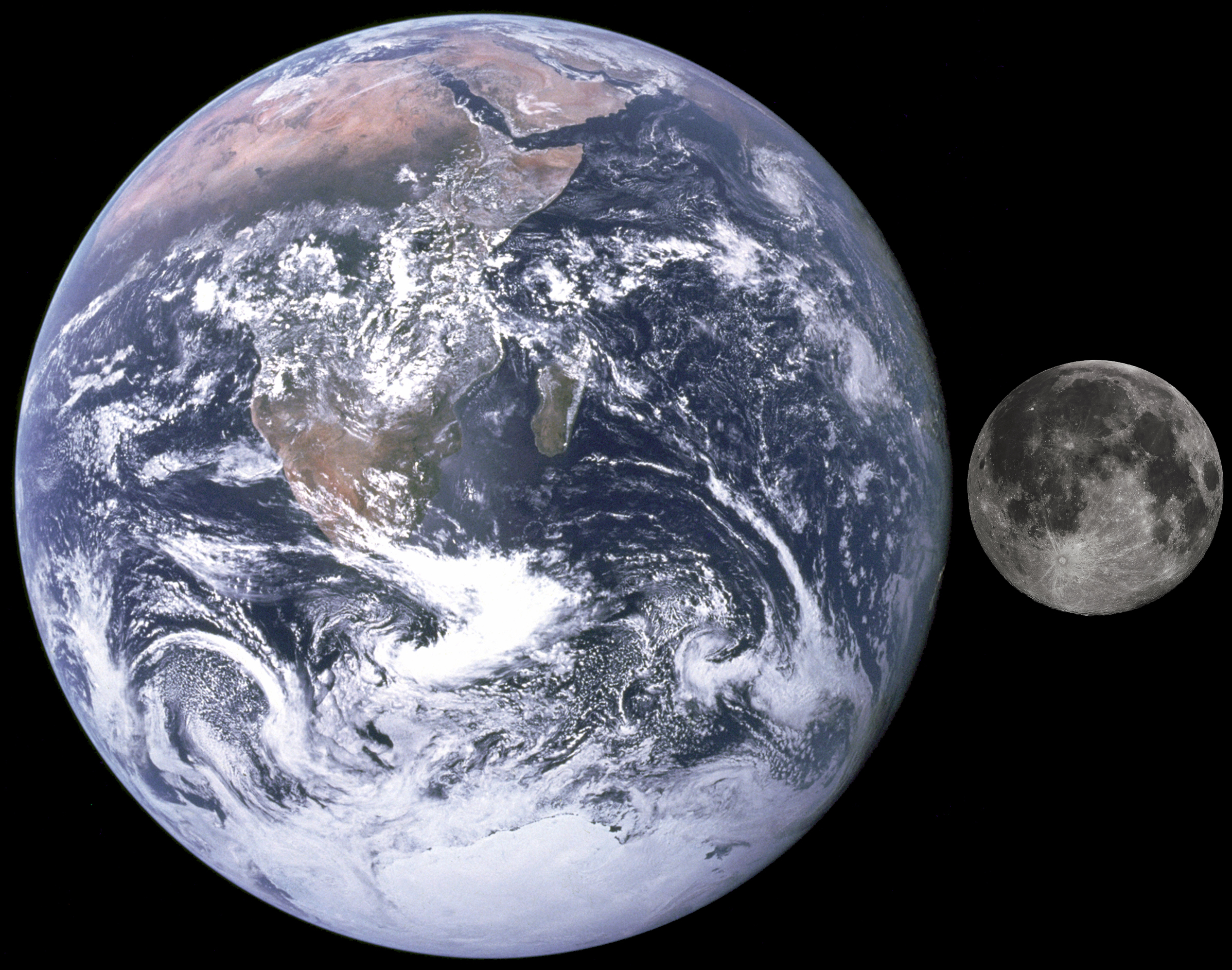
Size comparison of Earth and the Moon

There is no established lower limit on what is considered a "moon". Every natural celestial body with an identified orbit around a planet of the Solar System, some as small as a kilometer across, has been considered a moon, though objects a tenth that size within Saturn's rings, which have not been directly observed, have been called moonlets. Small asteroid moons (natural satellites of asteroids), such as Dactyl, have also been called moonlets.

The upper limit is also vague. Two orbiting bodies are sometimes described as a double planet rather than a primary and satellite; the Earth–Moon system is used as an example. Asteroids such as 90 Antiope are considered double asteroids, but they have not forced a clear definition of what constitutes a moon. Some authors consider the Pluto–Charon system to be a double (dwarf) planet, with one argument being that the barycentre lies above the surface of the larger body. In contrast, the barycenter of all planetary moons of the Solar System are located within the radius of their host planet.

== Origin and orbital characteristics ==
The natural satellites orbiting relatively close to the planet on prograde, uninclined circular orbits (regular satellites) are generally thought to have been formed out of the same collapsing region of the protoplanetary disk that created its primary. In contrast, irregular satellites (generally orbiting on distant, inclined, eccentric and/or retrograde orbits) are thought to be captured asteroids possibly further fragmented by collisions. Most of the major natural satellites of the Solar System have regular orbits, while most of the small natural satellites have irregular orbits. The Moon and the Moons of Pluto are exceptions among large bodies in that they are thought to have originated from the collision of two large protoplanetary objects early in the Solar System's history (see the giant impact hypothesis). The material that would have been placed in orbit around the central body is predicted to have reaccreted to form one or more orbiting natural satellites. As opposed to planetary-sized bodies, asteroid moons are thought to commonly form by this process. Triton is another exception; although large and in a close, circular orbit, its motion is retrograde and it is thought to be a captured dwarf planet.

=== Trojan satellites ===
Two natural satellites are known to have small companions at both their L_{4} and L_{5} Lagrangian points, sixty degrees ahead and behind the body in its orbit. These companions are called trojan moons, as their orbits are analogous to the trojan asteroids of Jupiter. The trojan moons are Telesto and Calypso, which are the leading and following companions, respectively, of the Saturnian moon Tethys; and Helene and Polydeuces, the leading and following companions of the Saturnian moon Dione.

=== Temporary satellites ===
The capture of an asteroid from a heliocentric orbit is not always permanent. According to simulations, temporary satellites should be a common phenomenon. As of 2023, the observed minor bodies that have displayed transient co-orbital motion with Earth are: 1991 VG, 2006 RH120, 2020 CD3, and 2022 NX1.

2006 RH120 was a temporary satellite of Earth for nine months in 2006 and 2007.

== Tidal locking ==
Most regular moons (natural satellites following relatively close and prograde orbits with small orbital inclination and eccentricity) in the Solar System are tidally locked to their respective primaries, meaning that the same side of the natural satellite always faces its planet. This phenomenon comes about through a loss of energy due to tidal forces raised by the planet, slowing the rotation of the satellite until it is negligible. Exceptions are known; one such exception is Saturn's natural satellite Hyperion, which rotates chaotically because of the gravitational influence of Titan. Pluto's four, circumbinary small moons also rotate chaotically under Charon's influence.

In contrast, the outer natural satellites of the giant planets (irregular satellites) are too far away to have become locked. For example, Jupiter's Himalia, Saturn's Phoebe, and Neptune's Nereid have rotation periods in the range of ten hours, whereas their orbital periods are hundreds of days.

== Satellites of satellites ==
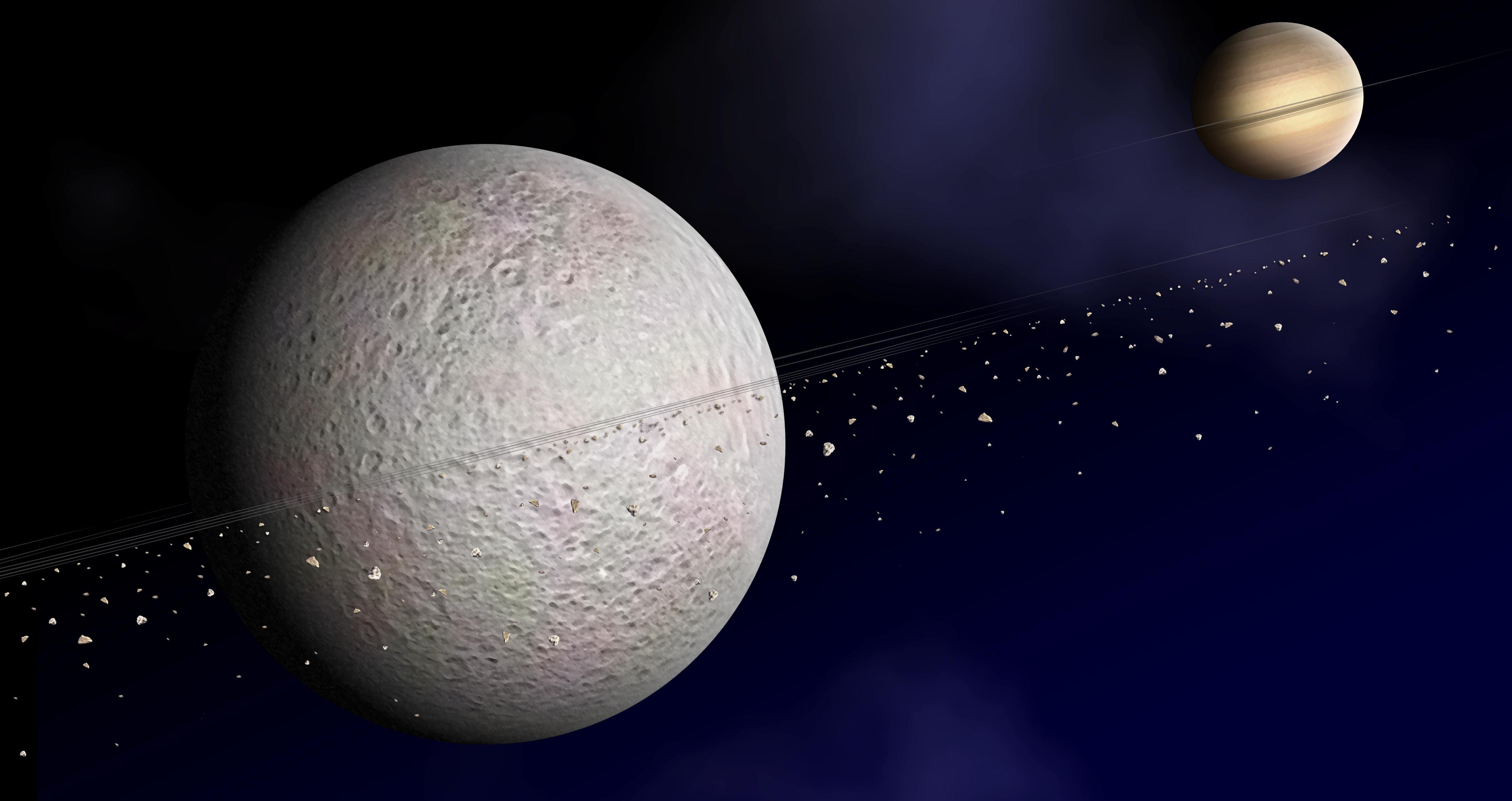
Artist impression of Rhea's proposed rings

No "moons of moons" or subsatellites (natural satellites that orbit a natural satellite of a planet) are currently known. In most cases, the tidal effects of the planet would make such a system unstable. Potential exceptions include large moons on wide orbits, including Titan, Iapetus, Callisto, and the Moon. However, other sources of dynamical instability may remove such submoons, such as mascons on the Moon.

Calculations performed after the 2008 detection of a possible ring system around Saturn's moon Rhea indicate that satellites orbiting Rhea could have stable orbits. Furthermore, the suspected rings are thought to be narrow, a phenomenon normally associated with shepherd moons. However, targeted images taken by the Cassini spacecraft failed to detect rings around Rhea.

It has also been proposed that Saturn's moon Iapetus had a satellite in the past; this is one of several hypotheses that have been put forward to account for its equatorial ridge.

Light-curve analysis suggests that Saturn's irregular satellite Kiviuq is extremely prolate, and is likely a contact binary or even a binary moon.

== Shape ==
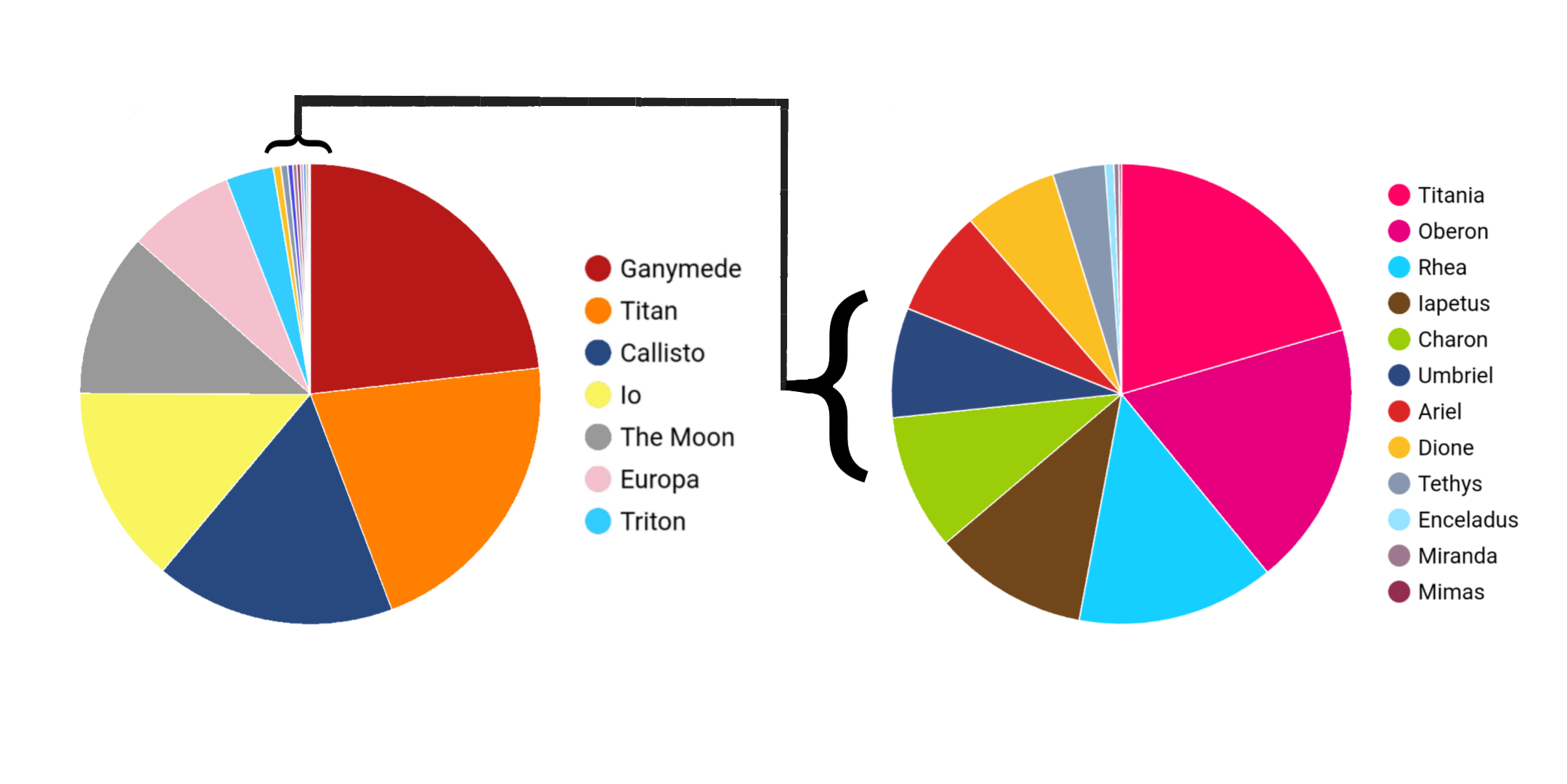
2 pie charts, one nested within the other, showing the relative masses of major Solar System moons

Neptune's moon Proteus is the largest irregularly shaped natural satellite, and is about as large as an icy moon can become before becoming relaxed into a spheroidal shape. The shapes of moons in synchronous orbit are expected to asymptotically change shape into rounded ellipsoids under hydrostatic equilibrium, although this may not happen in the age of the Solar System. For example, the larger Saturnian moons are in equilibrium, while Iapetus, Mimas, and Enceladus are apparently not. The "round" satellites are sometimes categorized as satellite planets or planetary-mass moons. The shapes of Eris' moon Dysnomia and Orcus' moon Vanth are presently unknown.

The larger natural satellites, being tidally locked, tend toward ovoid (egg-like) shapes: squat at their poles and with longer equatorial axes in the direction of their primaries (their planets) than in the direction of their motion. Saturn's moon Mimas, for example, has a major axis 9% greater than its polar axis and 5% greater than its other equatorial axis. Methone, another of Saturn's moons, is only around 3 km in diameter and visibly egg-shaped. The effect is smaller on the largest natural satellites, where their gravity is greater relative to the effects of tidal distortion, especially those that orbit less massive planets or, as in the case of the Moon, at greater distances.

Name	Satellite of	Difference in axes	
Name	Satellite of	km	% of mean diameter
Mimas	Saturn	33.4 (20.4 / 13.0)	8.4 (5.1 / 3.3)
Enceladus	Saturn	16.6	3.3
Miranda	Uranus	14.2	3.0
Tethys	Saturn	25.8	2.4
Io	Jupiter	29.4	0.8
Moon	Earth	4.3	0.1

== Geological activity ==
Of the nineteen known natural satellites in the Solar System that are large enough to be gravitationally rounded, several remain geologically active today. Io is the most volcanically active body in the Solar System, while Europa, Enceladus, and Triton display evidence of ongoing tectonic activity and cryovolcanism. In the first three cases, the geological activity is powered by the tidal heating resulting from having eccentric orbits close to their giant-planet primaries. (This mechanism would have also operated on Triton in the past before its orbit was circularized.) Many other natural satellites, such as Earth's Moon, Ganymede, Titan, Tethys, and Miranda show evidence of past geological activity, resulting from energy sources such as the decay of their primordial radioisotopes, greater past orbital eccentricities (due in some cases to past orbital resonances), or the differentiation or freezing of their interiors. Enceladus and Triton both have active features resembling geysers, although in the case of Triton solar heating appears to provide the energy. Titan and Triton have significant atmospheres; Titan also has hydrocarbon lakes. All four of the Galilean moons have atmospheres, though they are extremely thin. Four of the largest natural satellites, Europa, Ganymede, Callisto, and Titan, are thought to have subsurface oceans of liquid water, while smaller Enceladus also supports a global subsurface ocean of liquid water.

== Occurrence in the Solar System ==
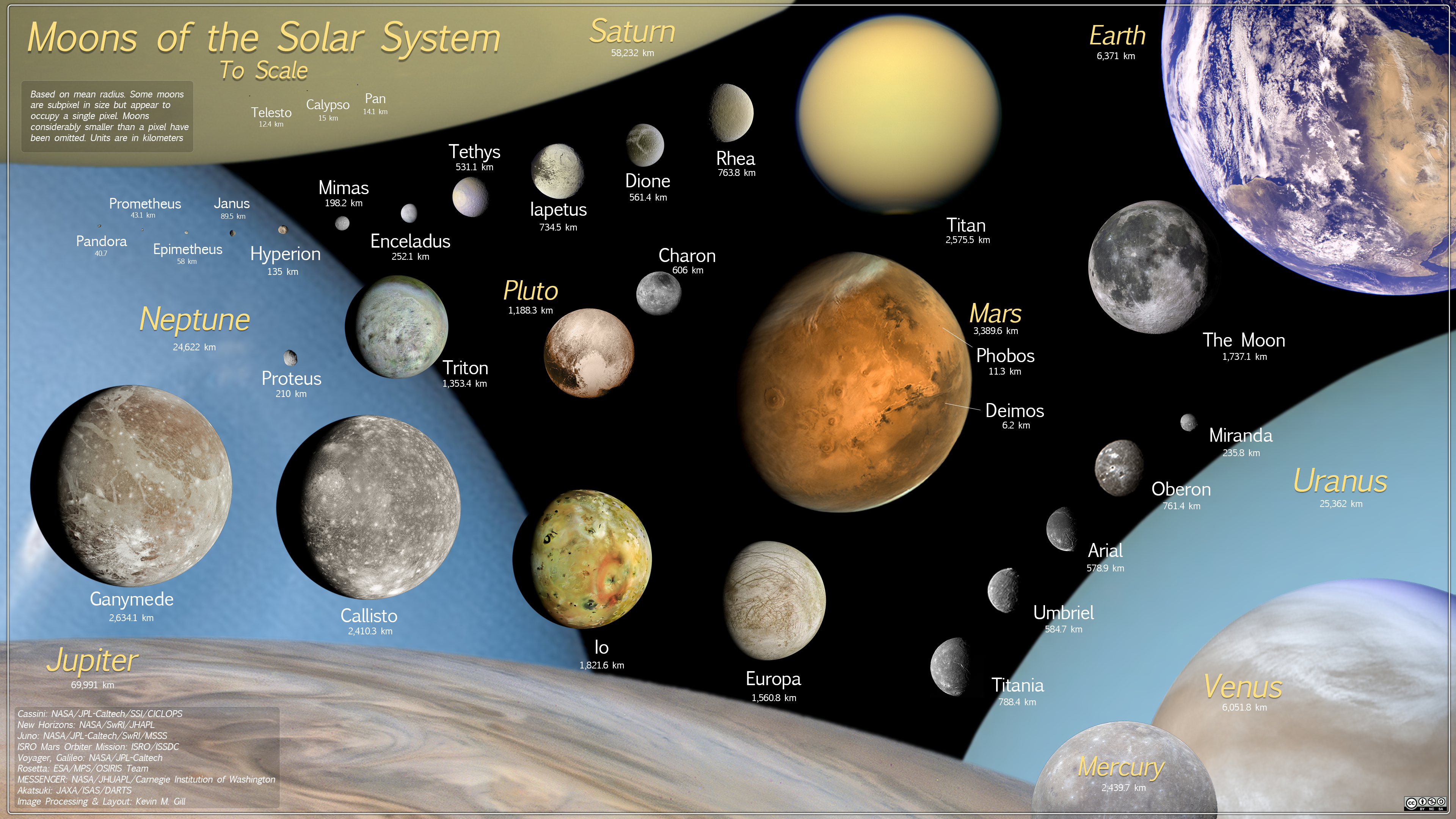
Largest moons to scale with their parent planets and dwarf planet

Of the inner planets, Mercury and Venus have no natural satellites; Earth has one large natural satellite, known as the Moon; and Mars has two tiny natural satellites, Phobos and Deimos. The giant planets have extensive systems of natural satellites, including half a dozen comparable in size to Earth's Moon: the four Galilean moons, Saturn's Titan, and Neptune's Triton. Saturn has an additional six mid-sized natural satellites massive enough to have achieved hydrostatic equilibrium, and Uranus has five. It has been suggested that some satellites may potentially harbour life.

Among the objects generally agreed by astronomers to be dwarf planets, Ceres and Sedna have no known natural satellites. Pluto has one relatively large natural satellite Charon and four smaller natural satellites; Styx, Nix, Kerberos, and Hydra. Haumea has two natural satellites; Orcus, Quaoar, Makemake, Gonggong, and Eris have one each. The Pluto–Charon system is unusual in that the center of mass lies in open space between the two, a characteristic sometimes associated with a double-planet system.

Planets around other stars are likely to have satellites as well, and although numerous candidates have been detected to date, as of 2024 none have yet been confirmed.

=== Non-planetary satellites ===
The discovery of 243 Ida's natural satellite Dactyl in the early 1990s confirmed that some asteroids have natural satellites; indeed, 87 Sylvia has two. Some, such as 90 Antiope, are double asteroids with two comparably sized components. For astronomers, a useful aspect of an asteroid satellite is that it can be used to determine the density of the primary asteroid, without the need for a spacecraft fly-by mission.

Besides planets and dwarf planets objects within the Solar System known to have natural satellites are 76 in the asteroid belt (five with two each), four Jupiter trojans, 39 near-Earth objects (two with two satellites each), and 14 Mars-crossers. There are also 84 known natural satellites of trans-Neptunian objects. Some 150 additional small bodies have been observed within the rings of Saturn, but only a few were tracked long enough to establish orbits.

=== Dimensions ===
The seven largest natural satellites in the Solar System (those bigger than 2,500 km across) are Jupiter's Galilean moons (Ganymede, Callisto, Io, and Europa), Saturn's moon Titan, Earth's Moon, and Neptune's captured natural satellite Triton. Of these, Ganymede and Titan are larger than the planet Mercury, while Callisto is about the same size. The next size group of nine mid-sized natural satellites, between 1,000 km and 1,600 km across, consists of Titania, Oberon, Rhea, Iapetus, Charon, Ariel, Umbriel, Dione, and Tethys, the smallest. As well as the natural satellites of the various planets, there are hundreds of known natural satellites of the dwarf planets, minor planets and other small Solar System bodies.

A planet usually has at least around 10,000 times the mass of any natural satellites that orbit it, with a correspondingly much larger diameter. The Earth–Moon system is a unique exception in the Solar System; at 3,474 kilometres (2,158 miles) across, the Moon is 0.273 times the diameter of Earth and about 1/80 of its mass. The next largest ratios are the Neptune–Triton system at 0.055 (with a mass ratio of about 1 to 4790), the Saturn–Titan system at 0.044 (with the second mass ratio next to the Earth–Moon system, 1 to 4225), the Jupiter–Ganymede system at 0.038 (with a mass ratio of 12810), and the Uranus–Titania system at 0.031 (with a mass ratio of 25125). For the category of dwarf planets, Charon has the largest ratio, being 0.52 the diameter and 12.2% the mass of Pluto.

The following is a comparative table classifying the natural satellites in the Solar System by diameter. The column on the right includes some notable planets, dwarf planets, asteroids, and trans-Neptunian objects for comparison. The natural satellites of the planets are named after mythological figures. These are predominantly Greek, except for the Uranian natural satellites, which are named after Shakespearean characters. The nineteen satellites massive enough to be round are in bold in the table below. Minor planets and satellites where there is disagreement in the literature on roundness are italicized in the table below.

Mean diameter (km)	Satellites of planets						Satellites of dwarf planets							Satellites of other minor planets	Non-satellites for comparison
Mean diameter (km)	Earth	Mars	Jupiter	Saturn	Uranus	Neptune	Orcus	Pluto	Haumea	Quaoar	Makemake	Gonggong	Eris	Satellites of other minor planets	Non-satellites for comparison
4,000–6,000			**Ganymede**; **Callisto**	**Titan**											**Mercury**
3,000–4,000	**Moon**		**Io**; **Europa**												
2,000–3,000						**Triton**									**Eris**; **Pluto**
1,000–2,000				**Rhea**; **Iapetus**; **Dione**; **Tethys**	**Titania**; **Oberon**; **Umbriel**; **Ariel**			**Charon**							**Makemake**; **Haumea**; **Gonggong**, **Quaoar**
500–1,000				**Enceladus**									Dysnomia		**Sedna**, **Ceres**, Salacia, Orcus, Pallas, Vesta many more TNOs
250–500				**Mimas**; Hyperion	**Miranda**	Proteus; Nereid	Vanth		Hiʻiaka					Salacia I Actaea; Varda I Ilmarë; Lempo II Hiisi	10 Hygiea; 704 Interamnia; 87 Sylvia; 47171 Lempo 107 Camilla and many others
100–250			Amalthea; Himalia; Thebe	Phoebe; Janus; Epimetheus	Sycorax; Puck; Portia	Larissa; Galatea; Despina			Namaka	Weywot	S/2015 (136472) 1			(82075) 2000 YW134 I Sila–Nunam I Ceto I Phorcys; Patroclus I Menoetius; Lempo I Paha; ~20 more moons of TNOs	3 Juno; 15760 Albion; 5 Astraea; 617 Patroclus; 42355 Typhon and many others
50–100			Elara; Pasiphae	Prometheus; Pandora	Caliban; Juliet; Belinda; Cressida; Rosalind; Desdemona; Bianca	Thalassa; Halimede; Neso; Naiad						Xiangliu (probably)		90 Antiope I Typhon I Echidna; Logos I Zoe; 5 more moons of TNOs	90 Antiope; 58534 Logos; 253 Mathilde and many others
25–50			Carme; Metis; Sinope; Lysithea; Ananke	Siarnaq; Helene; Albiorix; Atlas; Pan	Ophelia; Cordelia; Setebos; Prospero; Perdita; Stephano	Sao; S/2002 N 5 Laomedeia; Psamathe; Hippocamp		Hydra; Nix						Kalliope I Linus	1036 Ganymed; 243 Ida and many others
10–25		Phobos; Deimos	Leda; Adrastea	Telesto; Paaliaq; Calypso; Ymir; Kiviuq; Tarvos; Ijiraq; Erriapus	Mab; Cupid; Francisco; Ferdinand; Margaret; Trinculo; S/2023 U 1	S/2021 N 1 (?)		Kerberos; Styx						762 Pulcova I Sylvia I Romulus; 624 Hektor I Skamandrios; Eugenia I Petit-Prince; 121 Hermione I 283 Emma I 1313 Berna I 107 Camilla I	433 Eros; 1313 Berna and many others
< 10			99 moons	267 moons	Uranus XXVIII (?)									Sylvia II Remus; Ida I Dactyl and many others	many

== See also ==
- Circumplanetary disk – Accumulation of matter around a planet
- Co-orbital moon – Configuration of two or more astronomical objects
- Exomoon – Moon beyond the Solar System
- Inner moon – Natural satellite orbiting inside the orbit of a larger moon
- Irregular moon – Captured satellite following an irregular orbit
- Regular moon – Satellites that formed around their parent planet
- List of natural satellites
- Naming of moons
- Planetary-mass moon – Planetary-mass bodies that are also natural satellites
- Quasi-satellite – Type of satellite in sync with another orbit
- Subsatellite – Satellite that orbits a natural satellite (aka Submoon)
- Timeline of discovery of Solar System planets and their moons
- Trojan moon – Configuration of two or more astronomical objects
- Tug of war (astronomy) – Ratio of gravitational forces on a satellite from the Sun and host planet

=== Moons of planets ===
- The Moon, Earth's natural satellite
- Moons of Mars
- Moons of Jupiter
- Moons of Saturn
- Moons of Uranus
- Moons of Neptune

=== Moons of dwarf planets and small Solar System bodies ===
- Minor-planet moon
- Moons of Pluto
- Dysnomia, Eris's natural satellite
- Moons of Haumea
- S/2015 (136472) 1, Makemake's natural satellite
- Xiangliu, Gonggong's natural satellite
- Weywot, Quaoar's natural satellite
- Vanth, Orcus' natural satellite
