= Phil Nicholson =

Australian-born professor of astronomy

Philip D. Nicholson (born 1951) is an Australian-born professor of astronomy at Cornell University in the Astronomy department specialising in Planetary Sciences. He was editor-in-chief of the journal Icarus between 1998 and 2018.

== Career ==
Nicholson received his Ph.D. from Caltech in 1979. Nicholson's research centers on two main areas: orbital dynamics in planetary ring systems and infrared observational studies of planets, their satellites, and their rings. His work has included studies of the ring systems of Saturn, Uranus, and Neptune via Voyager observations and ground-based stellar occultations; Earth-based observations with the 5-meter Hale Telescope at Palomar Observatory of several small moons of Jupiter and Saturn discovered by the Voyager spacecraft; dynamical investigations of the planetary system around the pulsar PSR 1257 + 12, and of the rotational evolution of natural satellites; and studies of the zodiacal dust bands discovered by the Infrared Astronomical Satellite in 1983.

Together with colleagues in Canada and at Harvard, he has been involved in the discovery of numerous outer satellites of Uranus, Saturn and Neptune.

Nicholson was a member of the Visual Infrared Mapping Spectrometer science team on the NASA/ESA Cassini–Huygens mission to Saturn, and was the leader of a team of Cornell and Caltech astronomers studying the impact of Comet Shoemaker-Levy 9 into Jupiter in July 1994 using the Hale Telescope. He has served on the Committees on Planetary and Lunar Exploration and on Astronomy and Astrophysics of the National Research Council, time assignment committees for the Kuiper Airborne Observatory and Hubble Space Telescope, and scientific advisory committees for Arecibo and IPAC. He has coauthored review articles on planetary ring dynamics and on the Uranian and Neptunian ring systems.

== Honors ==
The inner main-belt asteroid 7220 Philnicholson, discovered by Edward Bowell at Anderson Mesa in 1981, was named in his honor. The official naming citation was published on 5 October 1998 (M.P.C. 32790).

Nicholson won the Harold Masursky Award in 2019, "for meritorious service to planetary science" in his role as editor-in-chief of Icarus.

He was elected a Legacy Fellow of the American Astronomical Society in 2020.
