= John J. Kavelaars =

Canadian astronomer (born 1966)

Minor planets discovered: 7
see § List of discovered minor planets

J-John Kavelaars, better known as JJ Kavelaars (born 1966), is a Canadian astronomer who was part of a team that discovered several moons of Jupiter, Saturn, Uranus, and Neptune. He is also a discoverer of minor planets and an investigator on the extended New Horizons mission, having aided in the discovery of 486958 Arrokoth.

== Biography ==
Kavelaars is a graduate of the Glencoe District High School in Glencoe, Ontario, the University of Guelph, and Queen's University, Kingston, Ontario. He is currently an astronomer at the Dominion Astrophysical Observatory in Victoria, B.C.

In the course of his work, he has been responsible for the discovery of eleven satellites (moons) of Saturn, eight of Uranus, and four of Neptune, and a hundred or so minor planets. Kavelaars is the Coordinator of the Canada–France Ecliptic Plane Survey which is part of the Canada-France-Hawaii Telescope Legacy Survey "CFHTLS": a project dedicated to the discovery and tracking of objects in the outer Solar System.

=== Family ===
JJ Kavelaars has two daughters, the eldest being Ruth Ann Margaret Kevelaars and the youngest being Catherine Frances Kevelaars. He is the brother of Canadian actress Ingrid Kavelaars and Canadian fencing athlete Monique Kavelaars.

=== Honors ===
The asteroid 154660 Kavelaars was named in his honor on 1 June 2007 by his colleague David D. Balam.

In 2022 Kavelaars was awarded the Canadian Astronomical Society Dunlap Award for Innovation in Astronomical Instrumentation and Software. This award recognized Kavelaars' contributions to the development and leadership of the Canadian Astronomy Data Centre, in particular the development of cloud-based astronomical data analysis using the CANFAR Science Platform.

In 2022 Kavelaars was awarded the National Research Council Dan Wayner award for outstanding achievement in Science and Technology. This award was presented in recognition of Kavelaars' co-discovery of 486958 Arrokoth and contributions to the NASA's New Horizons encounter with that object.

== List of discovered minor planets ==
(44594) 1999 OX3	21 July 1999	list^{[A]}^{[B]}^{[C]}
(60620) 2000 FD_{8}	27 March 2000	list^{[A]}^{[C]}^{[B]}
(60621) 2000 FE8	27 March 2000	list^{[A]}^{[C]}^{[B]}
(82053) 2000 SZ_{370}	23 September 2000	list^{[A]}
(182926) 2002 FU_{6}	20 March 2002	list^{[A]}^{[D]}
(418993) 2009 MS9	25 June 2009	list^{[C]}^{[A]}
(468422) 2000 FA_{8}	27 March 2000	list^{[A]}^{[C]}^{[B]}
Co-discovery made with:^{A} B. Gladman^{B} M. J. Holman^{C} J.-M. Petit^{D} A. Doressoundiram
