= Atmosphere of Jupiter =

Gas layer surrounding Jupiter

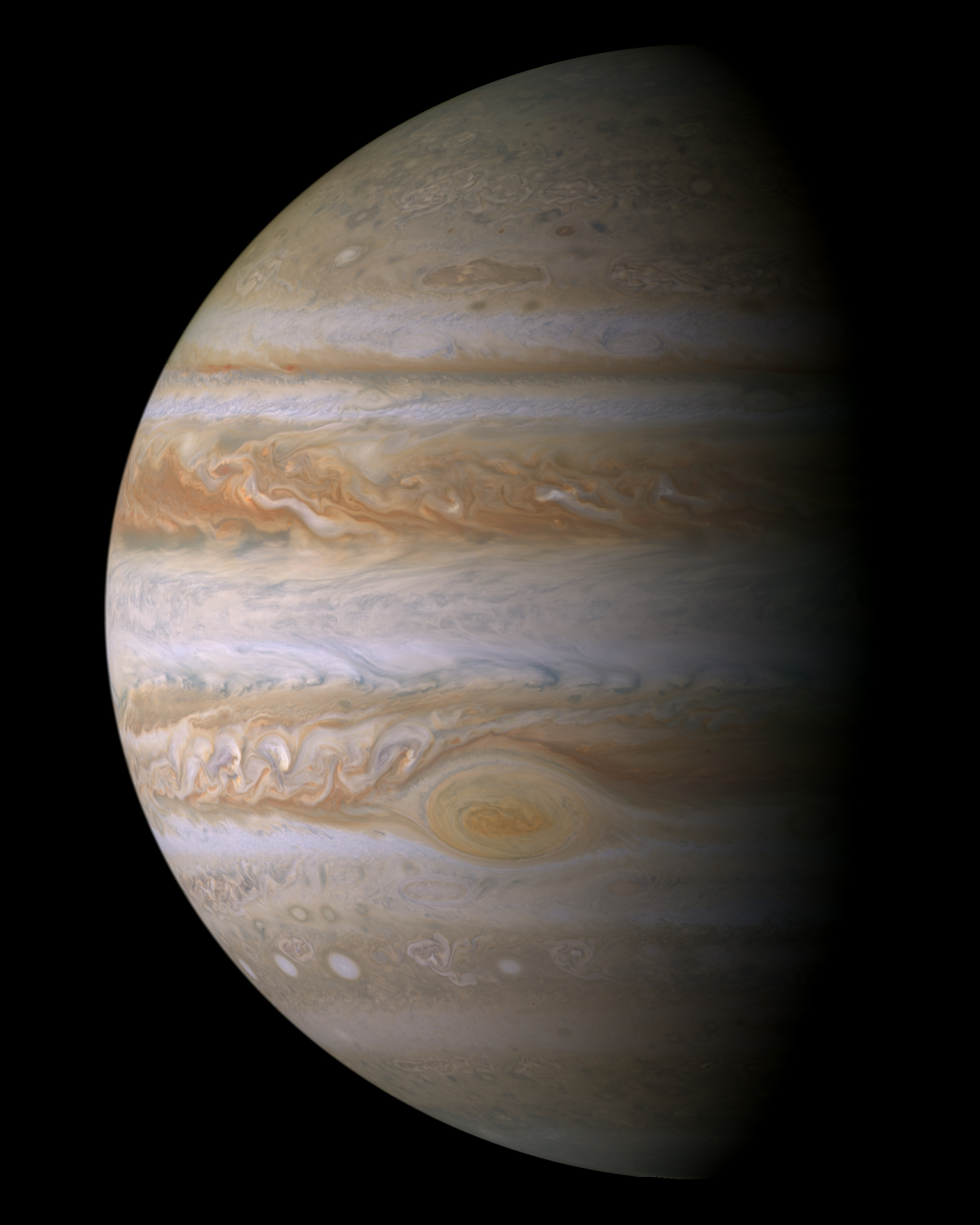
Jupiter's swirling clouds, in a true-color image taken during fly-by of the Cassini-Huygens probe on 29th of December, 2000

The atmosphere of Jupiter is the largest planetary atmosphere in the Solar System. It is mostly made of molecular hydrogen and helium in roughly solar proportions; other chemical compounds are present only in small amounts and include methane, ammonia, hydrogen sulfide, and water. Although water is thought to reside deep in the atmosphere, its directly-measured concentration is very low. The nitrogen, sulfur, and noble gas abundances in Jupiter's atmosphere exceed solar values by a factor of about three.

The atmosphere of Jupiter lacks a clear lower boundary, and gradually transitions into the liquid interior of the planet. From lowest to highest, the atmospheric layers are the troposphere, stratosphere, thermosphere and exosphere. Each layer has characteristic temperature gradients. The lowest layer, the troposphere, has a complicated system of clouds and hazes composed of layers of ammonia, ammonium hydrosulfide, and water. The upper ammonia clouds visible at Jupiter's surface are organized in a dozen zonal bands parallel to the equator and are bounded by powerful zonal atmospheric flows (winds) known as jets, exhibiting a phenomenon known as atmospheric super-rotation. The bands alternate in color: the dark bands are called belts, while light ones are called zones. Zones, which are colder than belts, correspond to upwellings, while belts mark descending gas. The zones' lighter color is believed to result from ammonia ice; what gives the belts their darker colors is uncertain. The origins of the banded structure and jets are not well understood, though a "shallow model" and a "deep model" exist.

False colored morphing animation of Jupiter's clouds in motion

The Jovian atmosphere shows a wide range of active phenomena, including band instabilities, vortices (cyclones and anticyclones), storms and lightning. The vortices reveal themselves as large red, white or brown spots (ovals). The largest two spots are the Great Red Spot (GRS) and Oval BA, which is also red. These two and most of the other large spots are anticyclonic. Smaller anticyclones tend to be white. Vortices are thought to be relatively shallow structures with depths not exceeding several hundred kilometers. Located in the southern hemisphere, the GRS is the largest known vortex in the Solar System. It could engulf two or three Earths and has existed for at least three hundred years. Oval BA, south of GRS, is a red spot a third the size of GRS that formed in 2000 from the merging of three white ovals.

Jupiter has powerful storms, often accompanied by lightning strikes. The storms are a result of moist convection in the atmosphere connected to the evaporation and condensation of water. They are sites of strong upward motion of the air, which leads to the formation of bright and dense clouds. The storms form mainly in belt regions. The lightning strikes on Jupiter are hundreds of times more powerful than those seen on Earth, and are assumed to be associated with the water clouds. Recent Juno observations suggest Jovian lightning strikes occur above the altitude of water clouds (3–7 bars). A charge separation between falling liquid ammonia-water droplets and water ice particles may generate higher-altitude lightning. Upper-atmospheric lightning has also been observed 260 km above the 1 bar level.

== Vertical structure ==
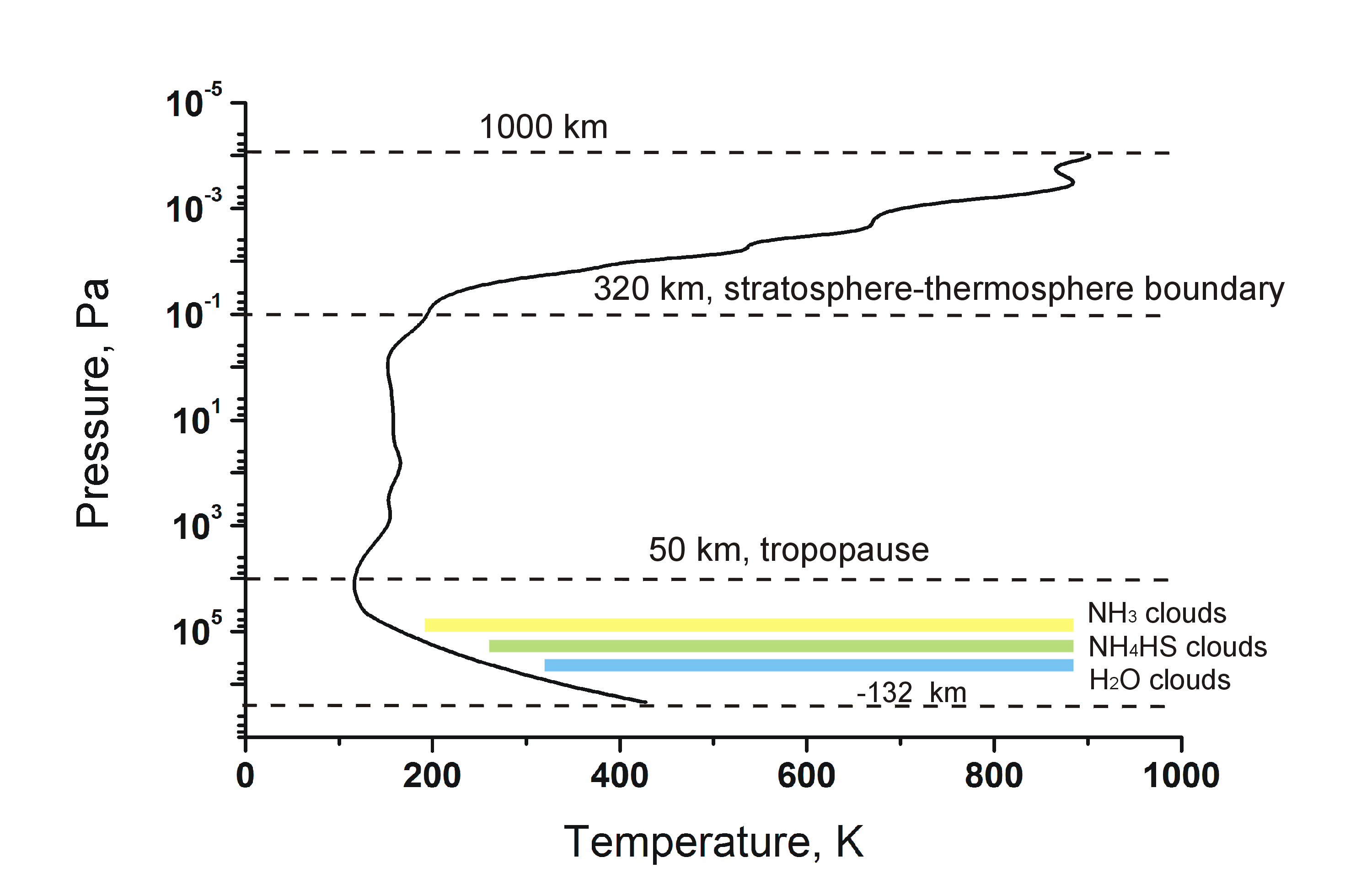
Vertical structure of the atmosphere of Jupiter. Note that the temperature drops together with altitude above the tropopause. The Galileo atmospheric probe stopped transmitting at a depth of 132 km below the 1 bar "surface" of Jupiter.

The atmosphere of Jupiter is classified into four layers, by increasing altitude: the troposphere, stratosphere, thermosphere and exosphere. Unlike the Earth's atmosphere, Jupiter's lacks a mesosphere. Jupiter does not have a solid surface, and the lowest atmospheric layer, the troposphere, smoothly transitions into the planet's fluid interior. This is a result of having temperatures and the pressures well above those of the critical points for hydrogen and helium, meaning that there is no sharp boundary between gas and liquid phases. Hydrogen is considered a supercritical fluid when the temperature is above 33 K and the pressure is above 13 bar.

Since the lower boundary of the atmosphere is ill-defined, the pressure level of 10 bar, at an altitude of about 90 km below 1 bar with a temperature of around 340 K, is commonly treated as the base of the troposphere. In scientific literature, the 1 bar pressure level is usually chosen as a zero point for altitudes—a "surface" of Jupiter with an atmospheric density of 0.16 kg/m3. As is generally the case, the top atmospheric layer, the exosphere, does not have a specific upper boundary. The density gradually decreases until it smoothly transitions into the interplanetary medium approximately 5,000 km above the "surface".

The vertical temperature gradients in the Jovian atmosphere are similar to those of the atmosphere of Earth. The temperature of the troposphere decreases with height until it reaches a minimum at the tropopause, which is the boundary between the troposphere and stratosphere. On Jupiter, the tropopause is approximately 50 km above the visible clouds (or 1 bar level). The pressure and temperature at the tropopause are about 0.1 bar and 110 K. (This gives a drop of 340 − 110 = 230 °C, over 90 + 50 = 140 km. The adiabatic lapse rate on Earth is around 9.8 °C/km. The adiabatic lapse rate is proportional to the average molecular weight and the gravitational force. The latter is about 2.5 times stronger than on Earth, but the average molecular weight is about 15 times less.) In the stratosphere, the temperatures rise to about 200 K at the transition into the thermosphere, at an altitude and pressure of around 320 km and 1 μbar. In the thermosphere, temperatures continue to rise, eventually reaching 1000 K at about 1000 km, where pressure is about 1 nbar.

Jupiter's troposphere contains a complicated cloud structure. The upper clouds, located in the pressure range 0.6–0.9 bar, are made of ammonia ice. Below these ammonia ice clouds, denser clouds made of ammonium hydrosulfide, (NH_{4})SH, or ammonium sulfide, (NH_{4})_{2}S (between 1–2 bar), and water (3–7 bar) are thought to exist. There are no methane clouds as the temperatures are too high for it to condense. The water clouds form the densest layer of clouds and have the strongest influence on the dynamics of the atmosphere. This is a result of the higher condensation heat of water and higher water abundance as compared to the ammonia and hydrogen sulfide (oxygen is a more abundant chemical element than either nitrogen or sulfur). Various tropospheric (at 200–500 mbar) and stratospheric (at 10–100 mbar) haze layers reside above the main cloud layers. The stratospheric haze layers are made from condensed heavy polycyclic aromatic hydrocarbons or hydrazine, which are generated in the upper stratosphere (1–100 μbar) from methane under the influence of the solar ultraviolet radiation (UV). The methane abundance relative to molecular hydrogen in the stratosphere is about 10^{−4}, while the abundance ratio of other light hydrocarbons, like ethane and acetylene, to molecular hydrogen is about 10^{−6}.

Jupiter's thermosphere is located at pressures lower than 1 μbar and demonstrates such phenomena as airglow, polar aurorae and X-ray emissions. Within it lie layers of increased electron and ion density that form the ionosphere. The high temperatures prevalent in the thermosphere (800–1000 K) could not be explained for over 50 years; models predicted a temperature no higher than about 400 K. Energy sources, including absorption of high-energy solar radiation (UV or X-ray), heating from the charged particles precipitating from the Jovian magnetosphere, friction-like Joule heating from currents in the auroral ionosphere, or dissipation of upward-propagating gravity waves, were proposed as possible solutions for this "Energy Crisis". Global infrared observations of the temperature structure and an updated model indicate the discrepancy is the result of auroral energy sourced from Joule heating and redistributed via ion drag. The thermosphere and exosphere at the poles and at low latitudes emit X-rays, which were first observed by the Einstein Observatory in 1983. The energetic particles coming from Jupiter's magnetosphere create bright auroral ovals, which encircle the poles. Unlike their terrestrial analogs, which appear only during magnetic storms, aurorae are permanent features of Jupiter's atmosphere. The thermosphere was the first place outside the Earth where the trihydrogen cation (H^{+}_{3}) was discovered. This ion emits strongly in the mid-infrared part of the spectrum, at wavelengths between 2 and 5 μm; this is a major cooling mechanism of the thermosphere.

== Chemical composition ==
Elemental abundances relative to hydrogen in Jupiter and Sun
Element	Sun	Jupiter/Sun
He/H	0.0975	0.807±0.02
Ne/H	1.23×10^{−4}	0.10±0.01
Ar/H	3.62×10^{−6}	2.5±0.5
Kr/H	1.61×10^{−9}	2.7±0.5
Xe/H	1.68×10^{−10}	2.6±0.5
C/H	3.62×10^{−4}	2.9±0.5
N/H	1.12×10^{−4}	3.6±0.5 (8 bar); 3.2±1.4 (9–12 bar)
O/H	8.51×10^{−4}	0.033±0.015 (12 bar); 0.19–0.58 (19 bar)^{[b]}
P/H	3.73×10^{−7}	0.82
S/H	1.62×10^{−5}	2.5±0.15

Isotopic ratios in Jupiter and Sun
Ratio	Sun	Jupiter
^{13}C/^{12}C	0.011	0.0108±0.0005
^{15}N/^{14}N	<2.8×10^{−3}	(2.3±0.3)×10^{−3} (0.08–2.8 bar)
^{36}Ar/^{38}Ar	5.77±0.08	5.6±0.25
^{20}Ne/^{22}Ne	13.81±0.08	13±2
^{3}He/^{4}He	(1.5±0.3)×10^{−4}	(1.66±0.05)×10^{−4}
D/H	(3.0±0.17)×10^{−5}	(2.25±0.35)×10^{−5}

The composition of Jupiter's atmosphere is similar to that of the planet as a whole. Jupiter's atmosphere is the most comprehensively understood of those of all the giant planets because it was observed directly by the Galileo atmospheric probe when it entered the Jovian atmosphere on December 7, 1995. Other sources of information about Jupiter's atmospheric composition include the Infrared Space Observatory (ISO), the Galileo and Cassini orbiters, and Earth-based observations.

The two main constituents of the Jovian atmosphere are molecular hydrogen (H_{2}) and helium. The helium abundance is 0.157±0.004 relative to molecular hydrogen by number of molecules, and its mass fraction is 0.234±0.005, which is slightly lower than the Solar System's primordial value. The reason for this low abundance is not entirely understood, but some of the helium may have condensed into the core of Jupiter. This condensation is likely to be in the form of helium rain: as hydrogen turns into the metallic state at depths of more than 10,000 km, helium separates from it forming droplets which, being denser than the metallic hydrogen, descend towards the core. This can also explain the severe depletion of neon (see Table), an element that easily dissolves in helium droplets and would be transported in them towards the core as well.

The atmosphere contains various simple compounds such as water, methane (CH_{4}), hydrogen sulfide (H_{2}S), ammonia (NH_{3}) and phosphine (PH_{3}). Their abundances in the deep (below 10 bar) troposphere imply that the atmosphere of Jupiter is enriched in the elements carbon, nitrogen, sulfur and possibly oxygen^{[b]} by a factor of 2–4 relative to the Sun.^{[c]} The noble gases argon, krypton and xenon also appear in abundance relative to solar levels (see table), while neon is much scarcer. Other chemical compounds such as arsine (AsH_{3}) and germane (GeH_{4}) are present only in trace amounts. The upper atmosphere of Jupiter contains small amounts of simple hydrocarbons such as ethane, acetylene, and diacetylene, which form from methane under the influence of the solar ultraviolet radiation and charged particles coming from Jupiter's magnetosphere. The carbon dioxide, carbon monoxide and water present in the upper atmosphere are thought to originate from impacting comets, such as Shoemaker-Levy 9. The water cannot come from the troposphere because the cold tropopause acts like a cold trap, effectively preventing water from rising to the stratosphere (see Vertical structure above).

Earth- and spacecraft-based measurements have led to improved knowledge of the isotopic ratios in Jupiter's atmosphere. As of July 2003, the accepted value for the deuterium abundance is (2.25±0.35)×10^{−5}, which probably represents the primordial value in the protosolar nebula that gave birth to the Solar System. The ratio of nitrogen isotopes in the Jovian atmosphere, ^{15}N to ^{14}N, is 2.3×10^{−3}, a third lower than that in the Earth's atmosphere (3.5×10^{−3}). The latter discovery is especially significant since the previous theories of Solar System formation considered the terrestrial value for the ratio of nitrogen isotopes to be primordial.

== Zones, belts and jets ==
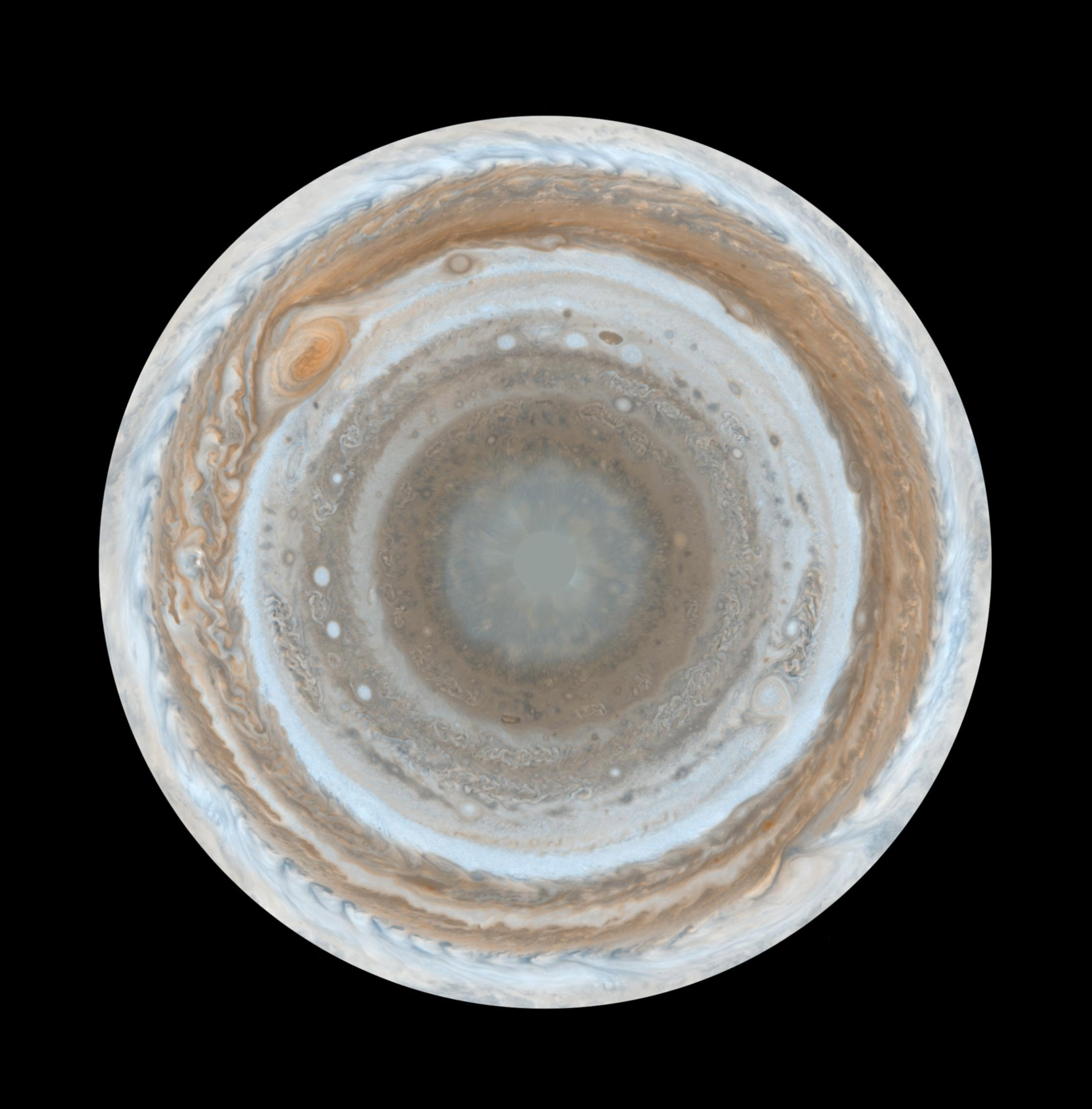
A polar stereographic projection of Jupiter's atmosphere centered about Jupiter's south pole

The visible surface of Jupiter is divided into several bands parallel to the equator. There are two types of bands: lightly colored zones and relatively dark belts. The wider Equatorial Zone (EZ) extends between latitudes of approximately 7°S to 7°N. Above and below the EZ, the North and South Equatorial belts (NEB and SEB) extend to 18°N and 18°S, respectively. Farther from the equator lie the North and South Tropical zones (NtrZ and STrZ). The alternating pattern of belts and zones continues until the polar regions at approximately 50 degrees latitude, where their visible appearance becomes somewhat muted.

The difference in the appearance between zones and belts is caused by differences in the opacity of the clouds. Ammonia concentration is higher in zones, which leads to the appearance of denser clouds of ammonia ice at higher altitudes, which in turn leads to their lighter color. On the other hand, in belts clouds are thinner and are located at lower altitudes. The upper troposphere is colder in zones and warmer in belts. The exact nature of chemicals that make Jovian zones and bands so colorful is not known, but they may include complicated compounds of sulfur, phosphorus and carbon.

The Jovian bands are bounded by zonal atmospheric flows (winds), called jets. The eastward (prograde) jets are found at the transition from zones to belts (going away from the equator), whereas westward (retrograde) jets mark the transition from belts to zones. Such flow velocity patterns mean that the jets' eastward momentum decreases in belts and increases in zones from the equator to the pole. Therefore, wind shear in belts is cyclonic, while in zones it is anticyclonic. The EZ is an exception to this rule, showing a strong eastward (prograde) jet and has a local minimum of the wind speed exactly at the equator. The jet speeds are high on Jupiter, reaching more than 100 m/s. These speeds correspond to ammonia clouds located in the pressure range 0.7–1 bar. The prograde jets are generally more powerful than the retrograde jets. The jets extend thousands of kilometers into the interior, as measured by the gravitometer instrument onboard of the Juno spacecraft. The direction at which the jets extend into the planet is parallel to Jupiter's axis of rotation rather than in a radial direction (toward the center of the planet), consistent with the Taylor-Proudman theorem. The Galileo Probe measured the vertical profile of a jet along its descent trajectory into Jupiter's atmosphere, finding the winds to decay over two to three scale heights^{[a]} above the clouds, while below the cloud level, winds increase slightly and then remain constant down to at least 22 bar—the maximum operational depth reached by the probe.

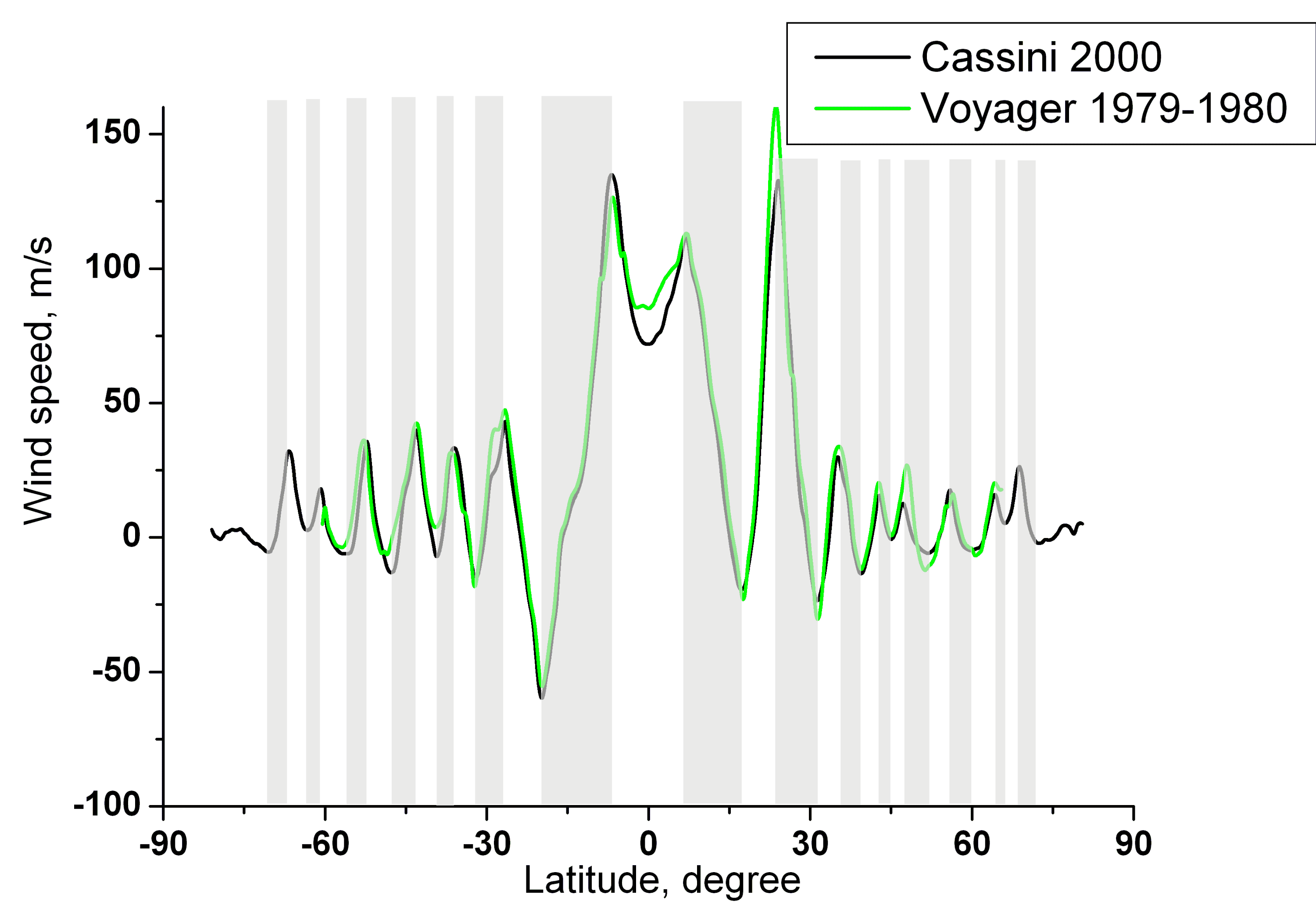
Zonal wind speeds in the atmosphere of Jupiter

The origin of Jupiter's colored banded structure is not completely clear, though it may resemble the cloud structure of Earth's Hadley cells. The simplest interpretation is that zones are sites of atmospheric upwelling, whereas belts are manifestations of downwelling. When air enriched in ammonia rises in zones, it expands and cools, forming high and dense white clouds. In belts, however, the air descends, warming adiabatically as in a convergence zone on Earth, and white ammonia clouds evaporate, revealing lower, darker clouds. The location and width of bands, speed and location of jets on Jupiter are remarkably stable, having changed only slightly between 1980 and 2000. One example of change is a decrease of the speed of the strongest eastward jet located at the boundary between the North Tropical zone and North Temperate belts at 23°N. However bands vary in coloration and intensity over time (see "specific band"). These variations were first observed in the early seventeenth century.

=== Meridional circulation cells ===
Meridional circulation cells are a large-scale atmospheric motion where gas rises at a certain latitude, travel in the north-south (meridional) direction, descends, and get back to the origin in a closed cell circulation. On Earth, the meridional circulation is composed of 3 cells in each hemisphere: Hadley, Ferrel and Polar cells. On Jupiter, the visible cloud bands gave indication for upward motion in the zones and downward motion in the belts, indicative only for the upper few bars. However, higher frequency of lightning flashes in the belts, indicative of upward atmospheric motion, gave indication for a reversed motion in the deeper atmosphere. Juno's microwave measurements probe the atmosphere down to ~240 bar. These measurements confirmed the existence of these motions as a part of mid-latitudes large circulation cells with upward motion in the belts and downward motions in the zones, extending from ~1 bar down to at least ~240 bar. So far, 8 cells have been identified at each of Jupiter's hemispheres along latitudes 20°-60° N/S. The mid-latitude cells are driven by breaking of atmospheric waves, similar to the Ferrel cells on Earth. While on Earth, the return flow in the cells' lower branch is balanced by friction in the Ekman layer, the balance in Jupiter in yet unknown, but one possibility is that the friction is maintained by magnetic drag.

=== Specific bands ===
Idealized illustration of Jupiter's cloud bands, labeled with their official abbreviations. Lighter zones are indicated to the right, darker belts to the left. The Great Red Spot and Oval BA are shown in the South Tropical Zone and South Temperate Belt, respectively.

The belts and zones that divide Jupiter's atmosphere each have their own names and unique characteristics. They begin below the North and South Polar Regions, which extend from the poles to roughly 40–48° N/S. These bluish-gray regions are usually featureless.

The North North Temperate Region rarely shows more detail than the polar regions, due to limb darkening, foreshortening, and the general diffuseness of features. However, the North-North Temperate Belt (NNTB) is the northernmost distinct belt, though it occasionally disappears. Disturbances tend to be minor and short-lived. The North-North Temperate Zone (NNTZ) is perhaps more prominent, but also generally quiet. Other minor belts and zones in the region are occasionally observed.

The North Temperate Region is part of a latitudinal region easily observable from Earth, and thus has a superb record of observation. It also features the strongest prograde jet stream on the planet—a westerly current that forms the southern boundary of the North Temperate Belt (NTB). The NTB fades roughly once a decade (this was the case during the Voyager encounters), making the North Temperate Zone (NTZ) apparently merge into the North Tropical Zone (NTropZ). Other times, the NTZ is divided by a narrow belt into northern and southern components.

The North Tropical Region is composed of the NTropZ and the North Equatorial Belt (NEB). The NTropZ is generally stable in coloration, changing in tint only in tandem with activity on the NTB's southern jet stream. Like the NTZ, it too is sometimes divided by a narrow band, the NTropB. On rare occasions, the southern NTropZ plays host to "Little Red Spots". As the name suggests, these are northern equivalents of the Great Red Spot. Unlike the GRS, they tend to occur in pairs and are always short-lived, lasting a year on average; one was present during the Pioneer 10 encounter.

The NEB is one of the most active belts on the planet. It is characterized by anticyclonic white ovals and cyclonic "barges" (also known as "brown ovals"), with the former usually forming farther north than the latter; as in the NTropZ, most of these features are relatively short-lived. Like the South Equatorial Belt (SEB), the NEB has sometimes dramatically faded and "revived". The timescale of these changes is about 25 years.

Zones, belts and vortices on Jupiter, November 2000. This 14-frame animation spans 24 Jovian days ≈10 Earth days. The wide equatorial zone [EZ] is visible in the center surrounded by two dark equatorial belts [SEB and NEB]. The grayish-blue irregular "hot spots" at the northern edge of the EZ change shape as they move east. The Great Red Spot is at the southern margin of the SEB. Strings of small storms rotate around northern-hemisphere ovals. The smallest features visible at the equator are about 600 km across. Small, bright features appearing for a single frame may be lightning storms. Black spots appearing for a frame in the SEB are moons of Jupiter occluding the field of view.

The Equatorial Region (EZ) is one of the most stable regions of the planet, in latitude and in activity. The northern edge of the EZ hosts spectacular plumes that trail southwest from the NEB, which are bounded by dark, warm (in infrared) features known as festoons (hot spots). Though the southern boundary of the EZ is usually quiescent, observations from the late 19th into the early 20th century show that this pattern was then reversed relative to today. The EZ varies considerably in coloration, from pale to an ochre, or even coppery hue; it is occasionally divided by an Equatorial Band (EB). Features in the EZ move roughly 390 km/h relative to the other latitudes.

The South Tropical Region includes the South Equatorial Belt (SEB) and the South Tropical Zone. It is by far the most active region on the planet, as it is home to its strongest retrograde jet stream. The SEB is usually the broadest, darkest belt on Jupiter; it is sometimes split by a zone (the SEBZ), and can fade entirely every 3 to 15 years before reappearing in what is known as an SEB Revival cycle. A period of weeks or months following the belt's disappearance, a white spot forms and erupts dark brownish material which is stretched into a new belt by Jupiter's winds. The belt most recently disappeared in May 2010. Another characteristic of the SEB is a long train of cyclonic disturbances following the Great Red Spot. Like the NTropZ, the STropZ is one of the most prominent zones on the planet; not only does it contain the GRS, but it is occasionally rent by a South Tropical Disturbance (STropD), a division of the zone that can be very long-lived; the most famous one lasted from 1901 to 1939.

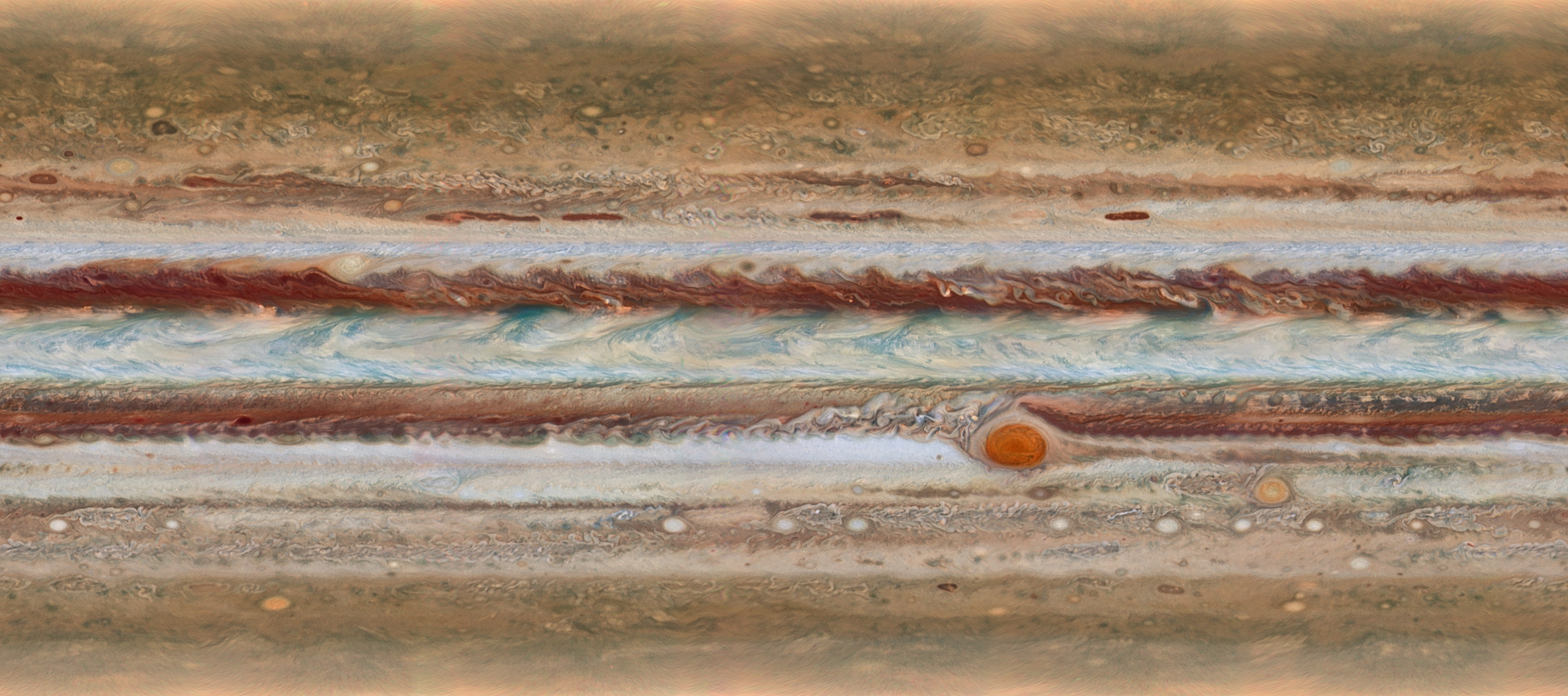
This false color image from the HST reveals a rare wave structure just north of the planet's equator.

The South Temperate Region, or South Temperate Belt (STB), is yet another dark, prominent belt, more so than the NTB; until March 2000, its most famous features were long-lived white ovals BC, DE, and FA, which have since merged to form Oval BA ("Red Jr."). The ovals were part of South Temperate Zone, but they extended into STB partially blocking it. The STB has occasionally faded, apparently due to complex interactions between the white ovals and the GRS. The appearance of the South Temperate Zone (STZ)—the zone in which the white ovals originated—is highly variable.

There are other features on Jupiter that are either temporary or difficult to observe from Earth. The South South Temperate Region is harder to discern even than the NNTR; its detail is subtle and can only be studied well by large telescopes or spacecraft. Many zones and belts are more transient in nature and are not always visible. These include the Equatorial band (EB), North Equatorial belt zone (NEBZ, a white zone within the belt) and South Equatorial belt zone (SEBZ). Belts are also occasionally split by a sudden disturbance. When a disturbance divides a normally singular belt or zone, an N or an S is added to indicate whether the component is the northern or southern one; e.g., NEB(N) and NEB(S).

== Dynamics ==
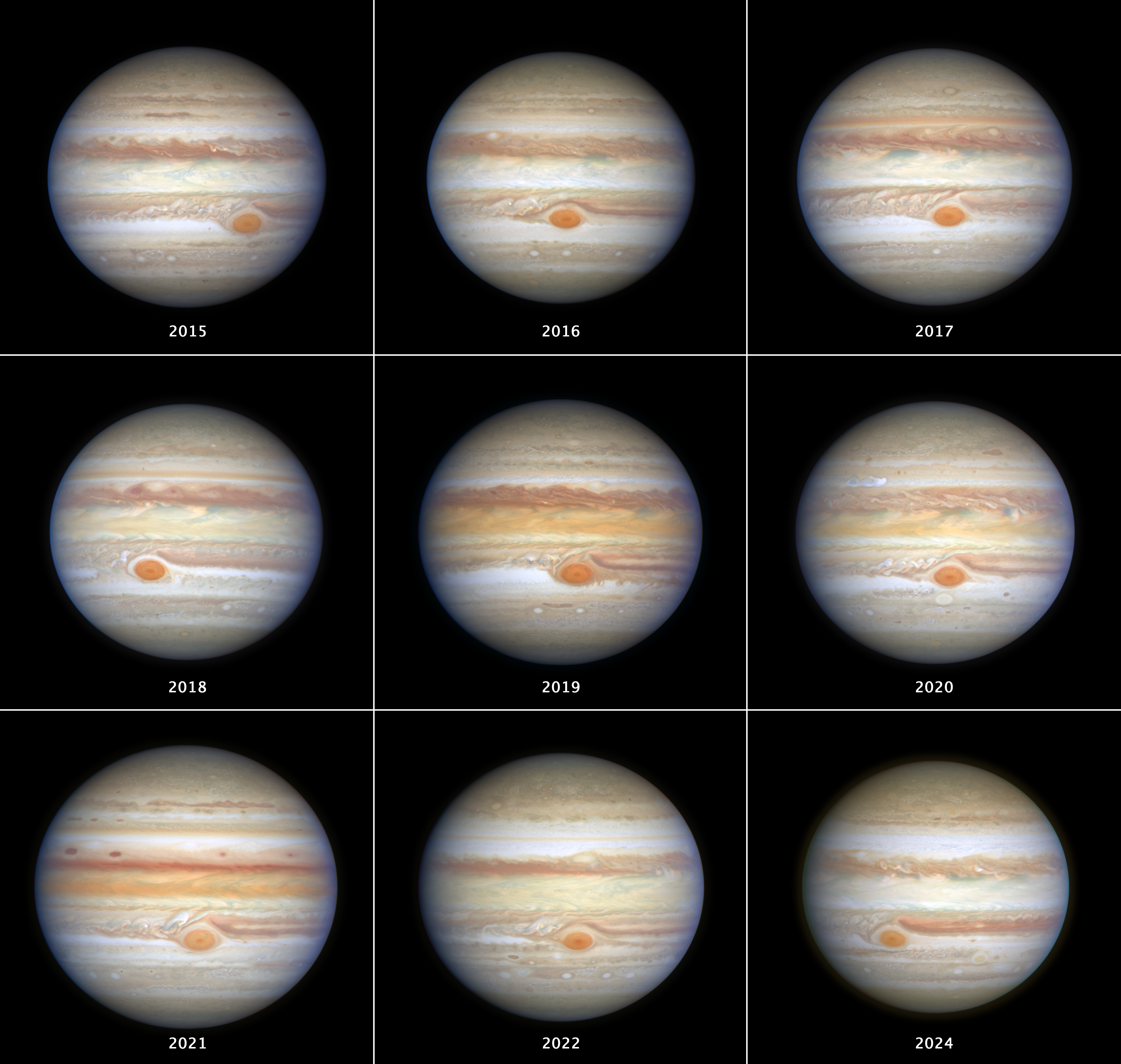
Hubble images of Jupiter taken under the OPAL (Outer Planet Atmospheres Legacy) program from 2015 to 2024, with approximately true color.

Circulation in Jupiter's atmosphere is markedly different from that in the atmosphere of Earth. The interior of Jupiter is fluid and lacks any solid surface. Therefore, convection may occur throughout the planet's outer molecular envelope. As of 2008, a comprehensive theory of the dynamics of the Jovian atmosphere has not been developed. Any such theory needs to explain the following facts: the existence of narrow stable bands and jets that are symmetric relative to Jupiter's equator, the strong prograde jet observed at the equator, the difference between zones and belts, and the origin and persistence of large vortices such as the Great Red Spot.

The theories regarding the dynamics of the Jovian atmosphere can be broadly divided into two classes: shallow and deep. The former hold that the observed circulation is largely confined to a thin outer (weather) layer of the planet, which overlays the stable interior. The latter hypothesis postulates that the observed atmospheric flows are only a surface manifestation of deeply rooted circulation in the outer molecular envelope of Jupiter. As both theories have their own successes and failures, many planetary scientists think that the true theory will include elements of both models.

=== Shallow models ===
The first attempts to explain Jovian atmospheric dynamics date back to the 1960s. They were partly based on terrestrial meteorology, which had become well developed by that time. Those shallow models assumed that the jets on Jupiter are driven by small scale turbulence, which is in turn maintained by moist convection in the outer layer of the atmosphere (above the water clouds). The moist convection is a phenomenon related to the condensation and evaporation of water and is one of the major drivers of terrestrial weather. The production of the jets in this model is related to a well-known property of two dimensional turbulence—the so-called inverse cascade, in which small turbulent structures (vortices) merge to form larger ones. The finite size of the planet means that the cascade can not produce structures larger than some characteristic scale, which for Jupiter is called the Rhines scale. Its existence is connected to production of Rossby waves. This process works as follows: when the largest turbulent structures reach a certain size, the energy begins to flow into Rossby waves instead of larger structures, and the inverse cascade stops. Since on the spherical rapidly rotating planet the dispersion relation of the Rossby waves is anisotropic, the Rhines scale in the direction parallel to the equator is larger than in the direction orthogonal to it. The ultimate result of the process described above is production of large scale elongated structures, which are parallel to the equator. The meridional extent of them appears to match the actual width of jets. Therefore, in shallow models vortices actually feed the jets and should disappear by merging into them.

While these weather–layer models can successfully explain the existence of a dozen narrow jets, they have serious problems. A glaring failure of the model is the prograde (super-rotating) equatorial jet: with some rare exceptions shallow models produce a strong retrograde (subrotating) jet, contrary to observations. In addition, the jets tend to be unstable and can disappear over time. Shallow models cannot explain how the observed atmospheric flows on Jupiter violate stability criteria. More elaborated multilayer versions of weather–layer models produce more stable circulation, but many problems persist. Meanwhile, the Galileo Probe found that the winds on Jupiter extend well below the water clouds at 5–7 bar and do not show any evidence of decay down to 22 bar pressure level, which implies that circulation in the Jovian atmosphere may in fact be deep.

=== Deep models ===
The deep model was first proposed by Busse in 1976. His model was based on another well-known feature of fluid mechanics, the Taylor–Proudman theorem. It holds that in any fast-rotating barotropic ideal liquid, the flows are organized in a series of cylinders parallel to the rotational axis. The conditions of the theorem are probably met in the fluid Jovian interior. Therefore, the planet's molecular hydrogen mantle may be divided into cylinders, each cylinder having a circulation independent of the others. Those latitudes where the cylinders' outer and inner boundaries intersect with the visible surface of the planet correspond to the jets; the cylinders themselves are observed as zones and belts.

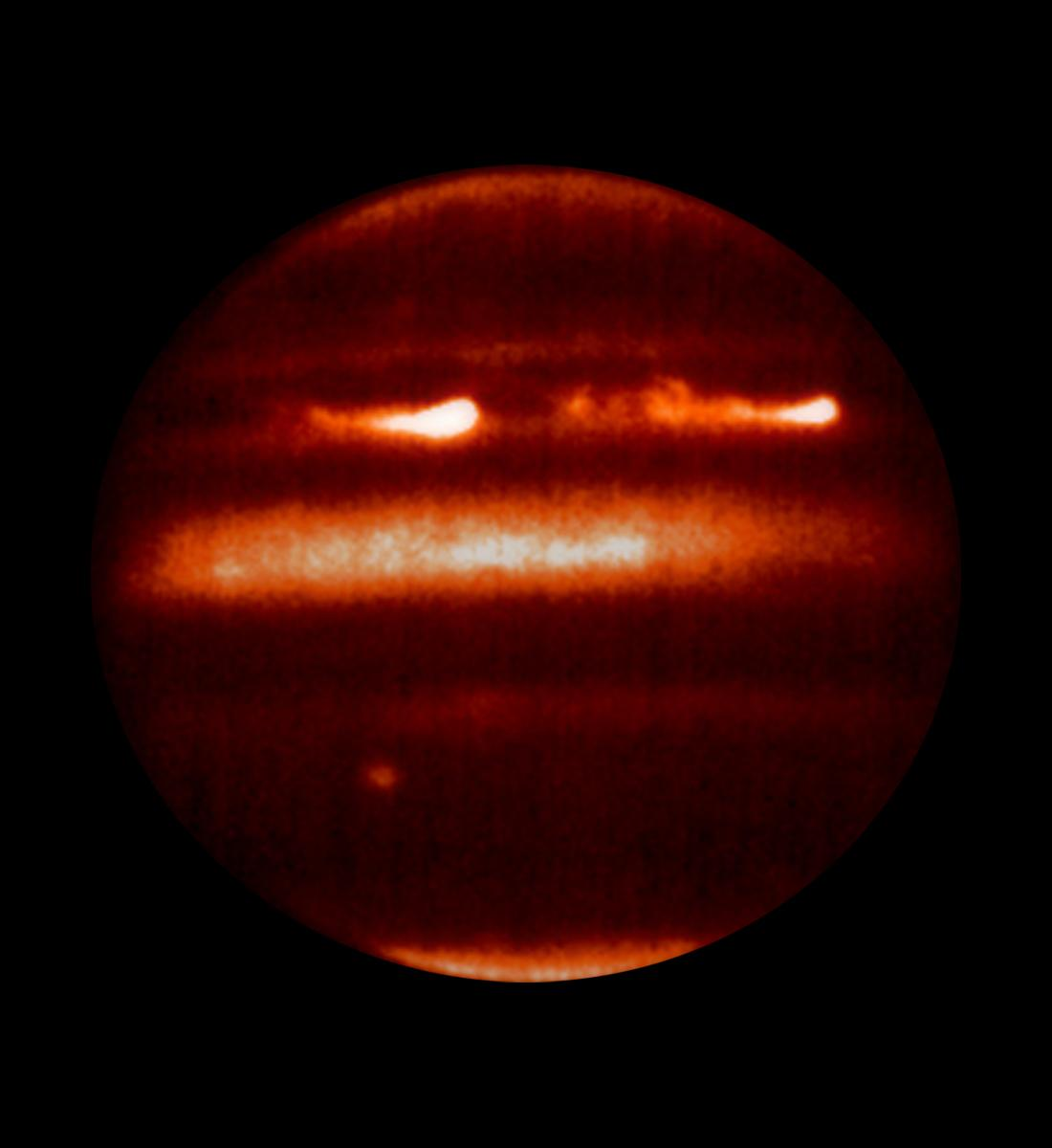
False color thermal image of Jupiter, by the NASA Infrared Telescope Facility.

The deep model easily explains the strong prograde jet observed at the equator of Jupiter; the jets it produces are stable and do not obey the 2D stability criterion. However it has major difficulties; it produces a very small number of broad jets, and realistic simulations of 3D flows are not possible as of 2008, meaning that the simplified models used to justify deep circulation may fail to catch important aspects of the fluid dynamics within Jupiter. One model published in 2004 successfully reproduced the Jovian band-jet structure. It assumed that the molecular hydrogen mantle is thinner than in all other models; occupying only the outer 10% of Jupiter's radius. In standard models of the Jovian interior, the mantle comprises the outer 20–30%. The driving of deep circulation is another problem. The deep flows can be caused both by shallow forces (moist convection, for instance) or by deep planet-wide convection that transports heat out of the Jovian interior. Which of these mechanisms is more important is not clear yet.

== Moist-convection and Y-shaped Structures on Jupiter's Equatorial Zone ==
Numerical simulations suggest that deep convection on Jupiter is primarily triggered by water condensation occurring at pressure levels ranging from approximately 5 bar to 500 mbar. At the upper altitudes of these convective plumes, where the pressure is a few hundred millibars, condensates such as NH_{3}, H_{2}S, and water are likely to form. In contrast, at pressures exceeding 3 bar, water becomes the dominant condensate. Global climate model (GCM) simulations using Jupiter-DYNAMICO indicate weaker convective activity in the equatorial regions compared to mid- to high latitudes, consistent with lightning observations. It is also possible that during strong storms on Jupiter, ammonia vapor dissolves into lofted water ice at pressures between 1.1 and 1.5 bar, forming a low-temperature liquid mixture of ammonia and water. This process facilitates the formation of ammonia-rich mushballs that transport ammonia to deeper layers of the atmosphere.

A possible mechanism for the formation of Y-shaped structures on Jupiter's equator is that Y-shaped structures are driven by equatorial modons coupled with convectively baroclinic Kelvin waves (CCBCKWs). This mechanism suggests that Y-shaped structures result from large-scale localized heating in a diabatic environment, which, upon reaching a critical threshold of negative pressure or positive buoyancy anomaly, generates a hybrid structure. This hybrid structure consists of a quasi equatorial modon, a coherent dipolar structure, coupled with a CCBCKW that propagates eastward in a self-sustaining and self-propelled manner. Initially, the hybrid moves steadily eastward; however, the larger phase speed of the CCBCKW eventually leads to its detachment from the quasi equatorial modon. The lifetime of this coupled structure varies from interseasonal to seasonal timescales. Moist convection is a necessary condition for triggering the eastward-propagating structure.

=== Internal heat ===
As has been known since 1966, Jupiter radiates much more heat than it receives from the Sun. It is estimated that the ratio of the thermal power emitted by the planet to the thermal power absorbed from the Sun is 1.67±0.09. The internal heat flux from Jupiter is 5.44±0.43 W/m^{2}, whereas the total emitted power is 335±26 PW. The latter value is approximately equal to one billionth of the total power radiated by the Sun. This excess heat is mainly the primordial heat from the early phases of Jupiter's formation, but may result in part from the precipitation of helium into the core.

The internal heat may be important for the dynamics of the Jovian atmosphere. While Jupiter has a small obliquity of about 3°, and its poles receive much less solar radiation than its equator, the tropospheric temperatures do not change appreciably from the equator to poles. One explanation is that Jupiter's convective interior acts like a thermostat, releasing more heat near the poles than in the equatorial region. This leads to a uniform temperature in the troposphere. While heat is transported from the equator to the poles mainly via the atmosphere on Earth, on Jupiter deep convection equilibrates heat. The convection in the Jovian interior is thought to be driven mainly by the internal heat.

== Discrete features ==
=== Vortices ===
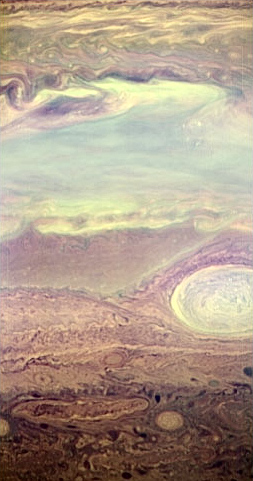
New Horizons IR view of Jupiter's atmosphere, false color

The atmosphere of Jupiter is home to hundreds of vortices—circular rotating structures that, as in the Earth's atmosphere, can be divided into two classes: cyclones and anticyclones. Cyclones rotate in the direction similar to the rotation of the planet (counterclockwise in the northern hemisphere and clockwise in the southern); anticyclones rotate in the reverse direction. However, unlike in the terrestrial atmosphere, anticyclones predominate over cyclones on Jupiter—more than 90% of vortices larger than 2000 km in diameter are anticyclones. The lifetime of Jovian vortices varies from several days to hundreds of years, depending on their size. For instance, the average lifetime of an anticyclone between 1000 and 6000 km in diameter is 1–3 years. Vortices have never been observed in the equatorial region of Jupiter (within 10° of latitude), where they are unstable. As on any rapidly rotating planet, Jupiter's anticyclones are high pressure centers, while cyclones are low pressure.

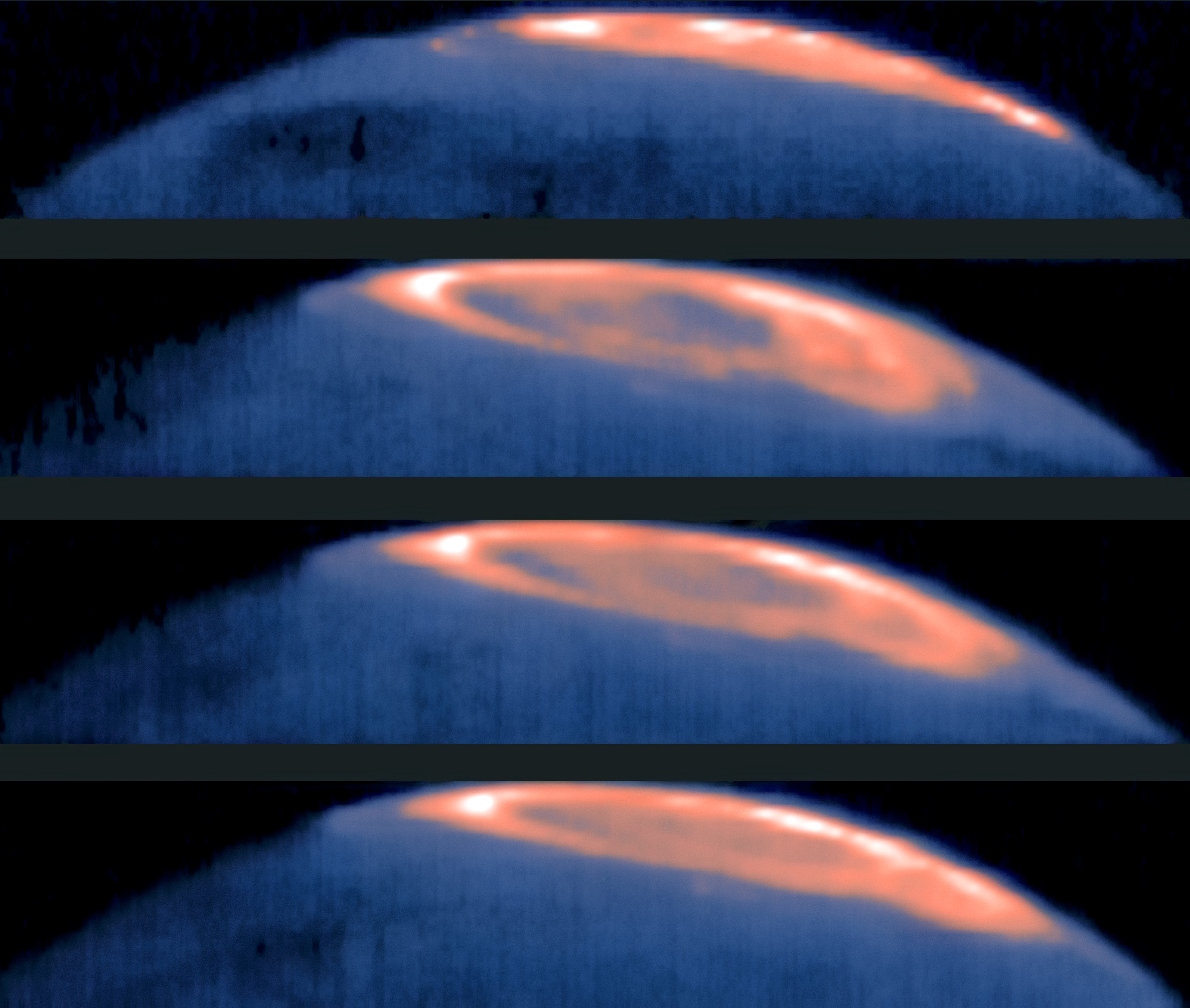
Great Cold Spot on Jupiter, false color

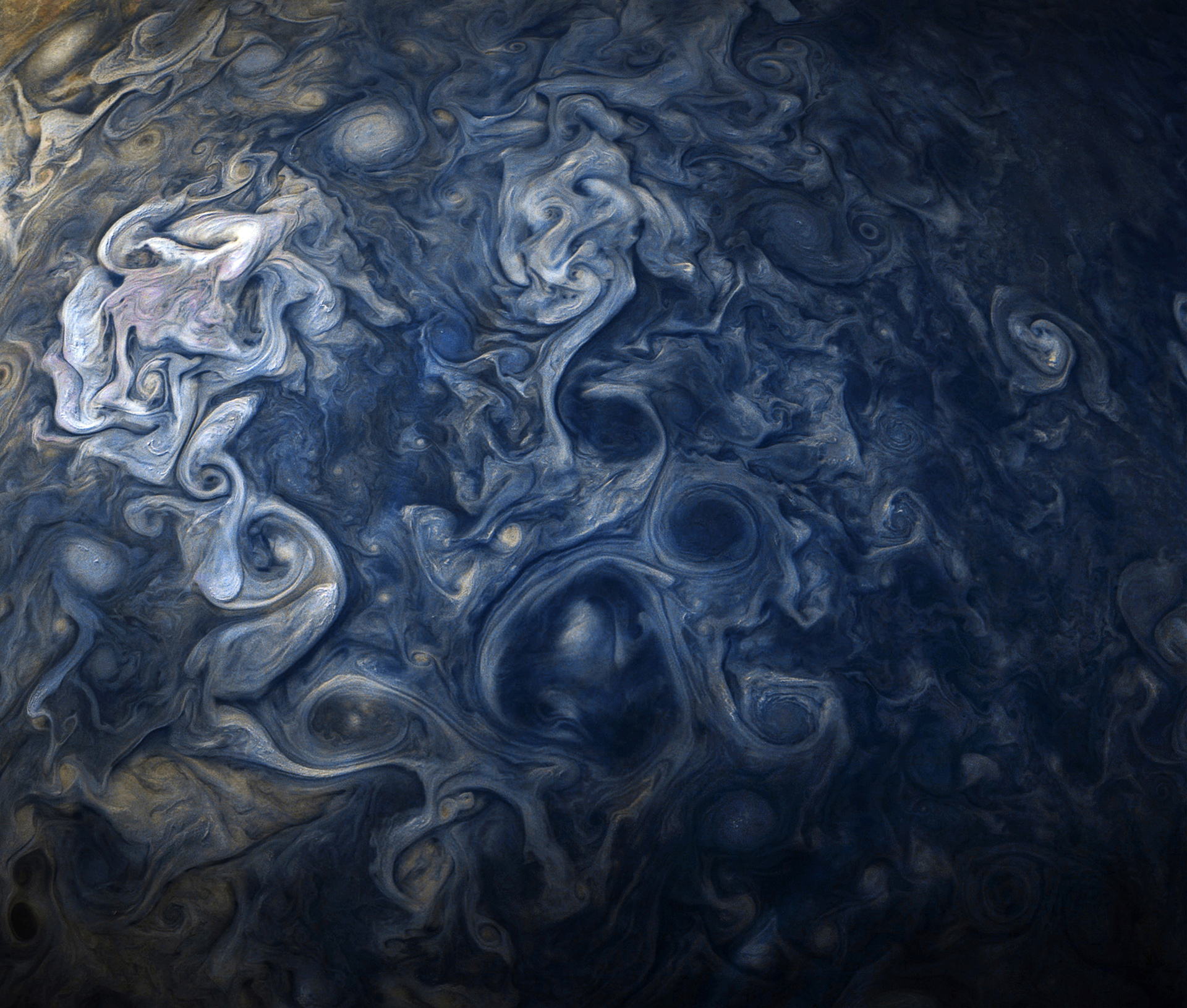
Jupiter clouds in false color (Juno; October 2017)

The anticyclones in Jupiter's atmosphere are always confined within zones, where the wind speed increases in direction from the equator to the poles. They are usually bright and appear as white ovals. They can move in longitude, but stay at approximately the same latitude as they are unable to escape from the confining zone. The wind speeds at their periphery are about 100 m/s. Different anticyclones located in one zone tend to merge when they approach each other. However Jupiter has two anticyclones that are somewhat different from all others. They are the Great Red Spot (GRS) and the Oval BA; the latter formed only in 2000. In contrast to white ovals, these structures are red, arguably due to dredging up of red material from the planet's depths. On Jupiter the anticyclones usually form through merges of smaller structures including convective storms (see below), although large ovals can result from the instability of jets. The latter was observed in 1938–1940, when a few white ovals appeared as a result of instability of the southern temperate zone; they later merged to form Oval BA.

In contrast to anticyclones, the Jovian cyclones tend to be small, dark and irregular structures. Some of the darker and more regular features are known as brown ovals (or badges). However the existence of a few long–lived large cyclones has been suggested. In addition to compact cyclones, Jupiter has several large irregular filamentary patches, which demonstrate cyclonic rotation. One of them is located to the west of the GRS (in its wake region) in the southern equatorial belt. These patches are called cyclonic regions (CR). The cyclones are always located in the belts and tend to merge when they encounter each other, much like anticyclones.

The deep structure of vortices is not completely clear. They are thought to be relatively thin, as any thickness greater than about 500 km will lead to instability. The large anticyclones are known to extend only a few tens of kilometers above the visible clouds. As of 2008, the early hypothesis that the vortices are deep convective plumes (or convective columns) is not shared by the majority of planetary scientists.

==== Great Red Spot ====
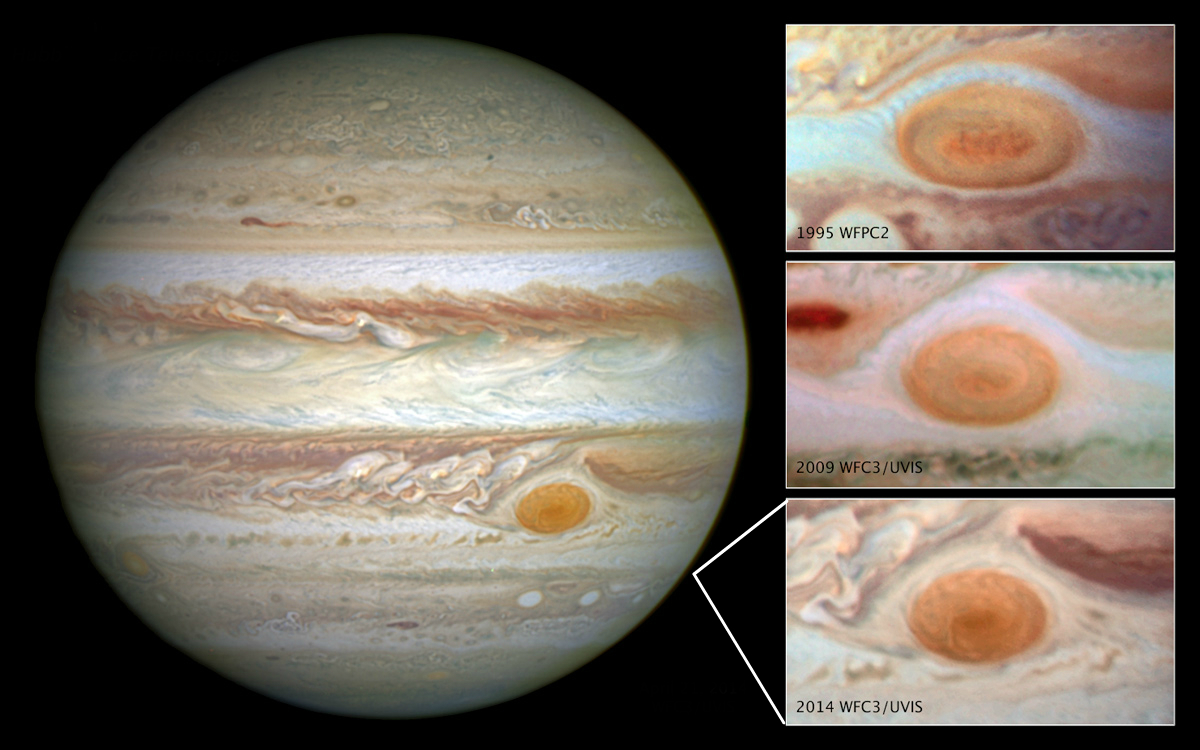
The Great Red Spot is shown here over the course of 2 decades decreasing in size (May 15, 2014).

The Great Red Spot (GRS) is a persistent anticyclonic storm, 22° south of Jupiter's equator; observations from Earth establish a minimum storm lifetime of 350 years. A storm was described as a "permanent spot" by Gian Domenico Cassini after observing the feature in July 1665 with his instrument-maker Eustachio Divini. According to a report by Giovanni Battista Riccioli in 1635, Leander Bandtius, whom Riccioli identified as the Abbot of Dunisburgh who possessed an "extraordinary telescope", observed a large spot that he described as "oval, equaling one seventh of Jupiter's diameter at its longest." According to Riccioli, "these features are seldom able to be seen, and then only by a telescope of exceptional quality and magnification". The Great Spot has been continually observed since the 1870s, however.

The GRS rotates counter-clockwise, with a period of about six Earth days or 14 Jovian days. Its dimensions are 24,000–40,000 km east-to-west and 12,000–14,000 km north-to-south. The spot is large enough to contain two or three planets the size of Earth. At the start of 2004, the Great Red Spot had approximately half the longitudinal extent it had a century ago, when it was 40,000 km in diameter. At the present rate of reduction, it could potentially become circular by 2040, although this is unlikely because of the distortion effect of the neighboring jet streams. It is not known how long the spot will last, or whether the change is a result of normal fluctuations.

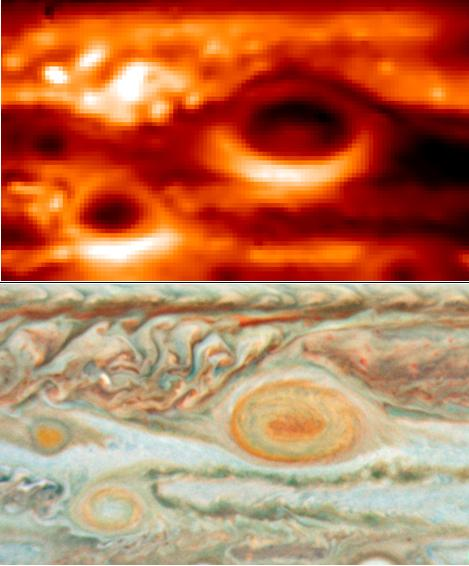
Two images of the Great Red Spot (center-right) and Oval BA (lower left) taken in May, 2008. Top: Infrared image by the Very Large Telescope, showing the cool centers of the storms. Bottom: Optical image by the Hubble Space Telescope.

According to a study by scientists at the University of California, Berkeley, between 1996 and 2006 the spot lost 15 percent of its diameter along its major axis. Xylar Asay-Davis, who was on the team that conducted the study, noted that the spot is not disappearing because "velocity is a more robust measurement because the clouds associated with the Red Spot are also strongly influenced by numerous other phenomena in the surrounding atmosphere."

Infrared data have long indicated that the Great Red Spot is colder (and thus, higher in altitude) than most of the other clouds on the planet; the cloudtops of the GRS are about 8 km above the surrounding clouds. Furthermore, careful tracking of atmospheric features revealed the spot's counterclockwise circulation as far back as 1966 – observations dramatically confirmed by the first time-lapse movies from the Voyager flybys. The spot is spatially confined by a modest eastward jet stream (prograde) to its south and a very strong westward (retrograde) one to its north. Though winds around the edge of the spot peak at about 120 m/s (430 km/h), currents inside it seem stagnant, with little inflow or outflow. The rotation period of the spot has decreased with time, perhaps as a direct result of its steady reduction in size. In 2010, astronomers imaged the GRS in the far infrared (from 8.5 to 24 μm) with a spatial resolution higher than ever before and found that its central, reddest region is warmer than its surroundings by between 3–4 K. The warm airmass is located in the upper troposphere in the pressure range of 200–500 mbar. This warm central spot slowly counter-rotates and may be caused by a weak subsidence of air in the center of GRS.

The Great Red Spot's latitude has been stable for the duration of good observational records, typically varying by about a degree. Its longitude, however, is subject to constant variation. Because Jupiter's visible features do not rotate uniformly at all latitudes, astronomers have defined three different systems for defining the longitude. System II is used for latitudes of more than 10°, and was originally based on the average rotation rate of the Great Red Spot of 9h 55m 42s. Despite this, the spot has "lapped" the planet in System II at least 10 times since the early 19th century. Its drift rate has changed dramatically over the years and has been linked to the brightness of the South Equatorial Belt, and the presence or absence of a South Tropical Disturbance.

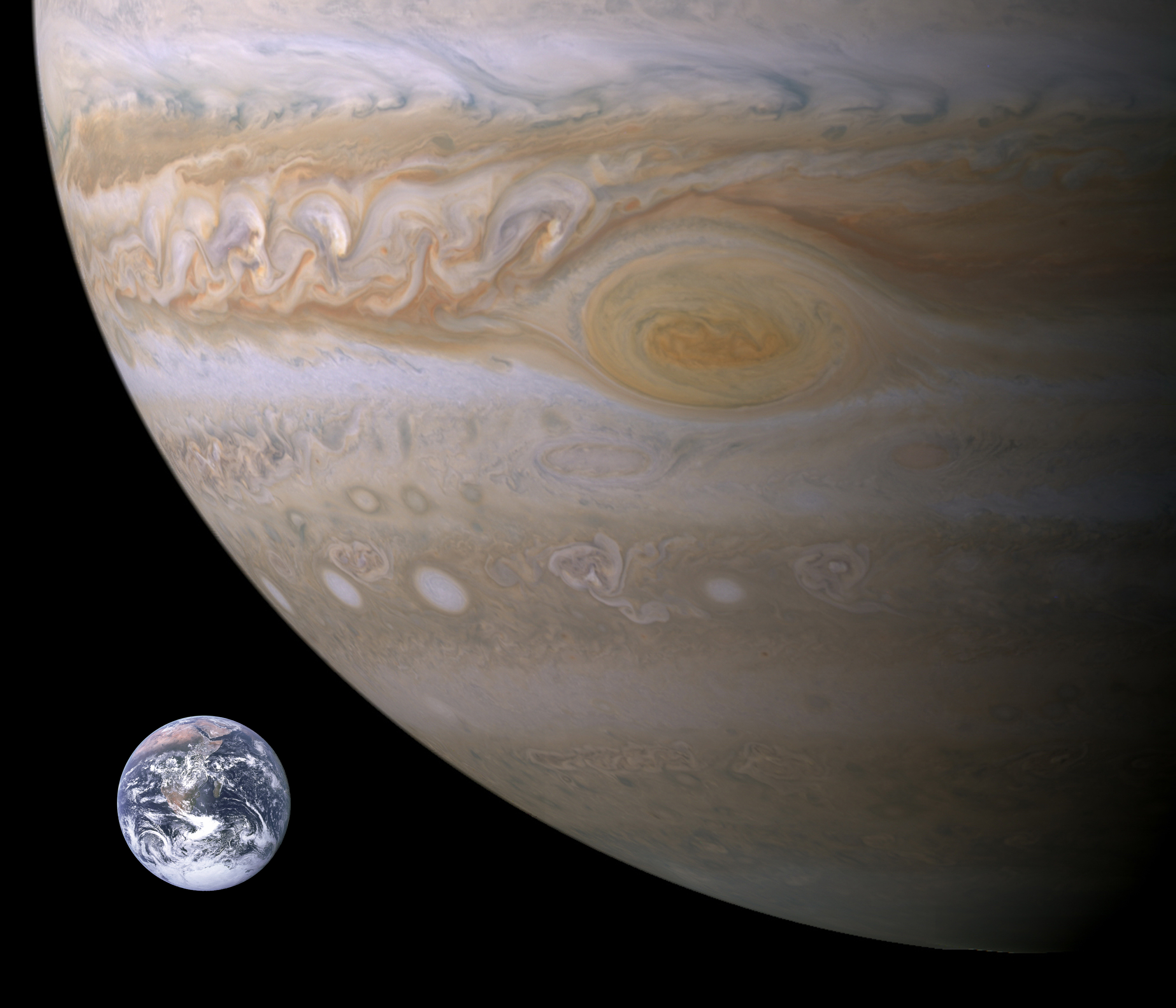
Approximate size comparison of Earth superimposed on this Dec 29, 2000 image showing the Great Red Spot

It is not known exactly what causes the Great Red Spot's reddish color. Theories supported by laboratory experiments suppose that the color may be caused by complex organic molecules, red phosphorus, or yet another sulfur compound. The GRS varies greatly in hue, from almost brick-red to pale salmon, or even white. The higher temperature of the reddest central region is the first evidence that the Spot's color is affected by environmental factors. The spot occasionally disappears from the visible spectrum, becoming evident only through the Red Spot Hollow, which is its niche in the South Equatorial Belt (SEB). The visibility of GRS is apparently coupled to the appearance of the SEB; when the belt is bright white, the spot tends to be dark, and when it is dark, the spot is usually light. The periods when the spot is dark or light occur at irregular intervals; in the 50 years from 1947 to 1997, the spot was darkest in the periods 1961–1966, 1968–1975, 1989–1990, and 1992–1993. In November 2014, an analysis of data from NASA's Cassini mission revealed that the red color is likely a product of simple chemicals being broken apart by solar ultraviolet irradiation in the planet's upper atmosphere.

The Great Red Spot should not be confused with the Great Dark Spot, a feature observed near Jupiter's north pole (bottom) in 2000 by the Cassini–Huygens spacecraft. A feature in the atmosphere of Neptune was also called the Great Dark Spot. The latter feature, imaged by Voyager 2 in 1989, may have been an atmospheric hole rather than a storm. It was no longer present in 1994, although a similar spot had appeared farther to the north.

==== Oval BA ====
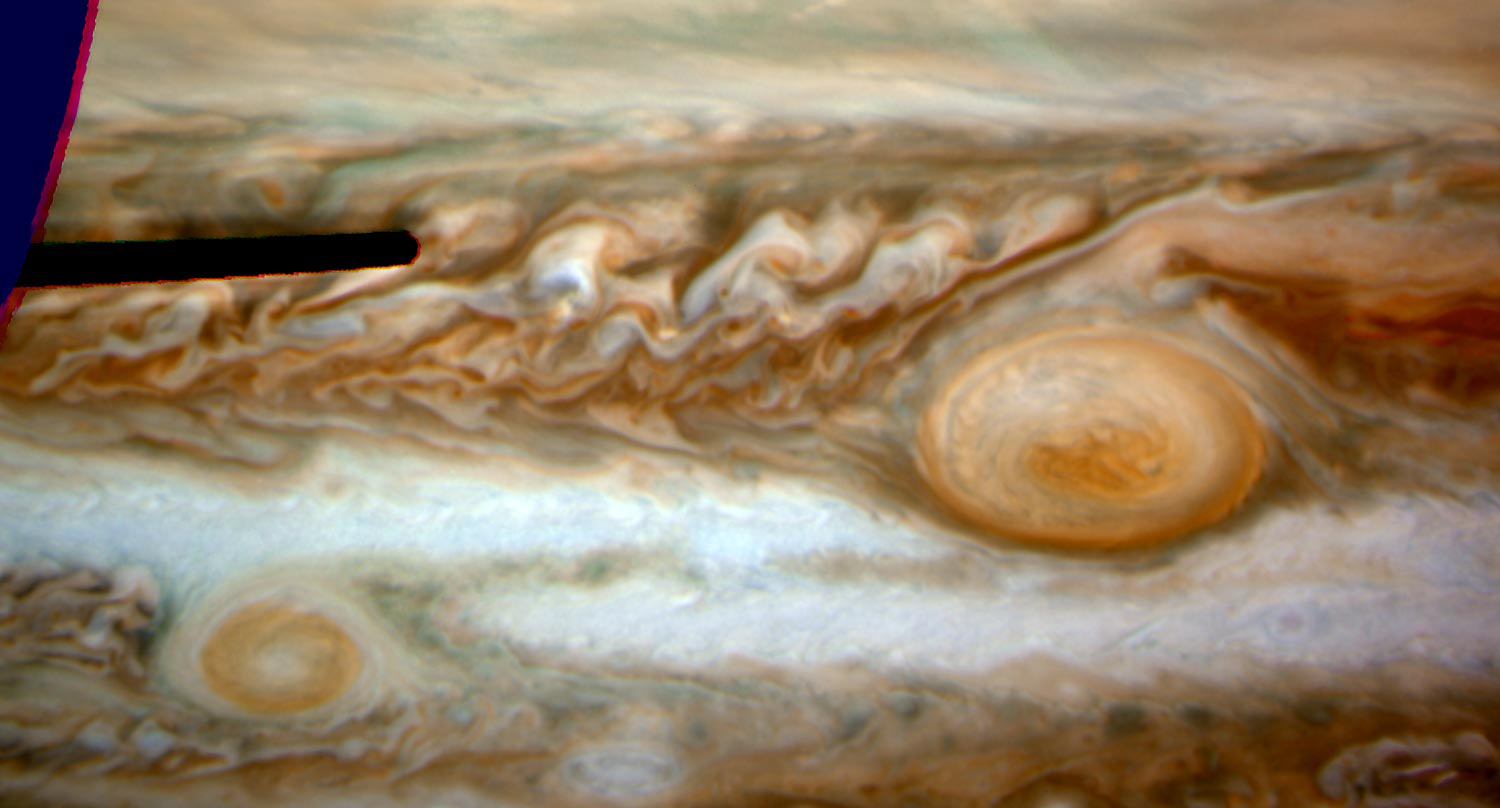
Oval BA (left)

Oval BA is a red storm in Jupiter's southern hemisphere similar in form to, though smaller than, the Great Red Spot (it is often affectionately referred to as "Red Spot Jr.", "Red Jr." or "The Little Red Spot"). A feature in the South Temperate Belt, Oval BA was first seen in 2000 after the collision of three small white storms, and has intensified since then.

The formation of the three white oval storms that later merged into Oval BA can be traced to 1939, when the South Temperate Zone was torn by dark features that effectively split the zone into three long sections. Jovian observer Elmer J. Reese labeled the dark sections AB, CD, and EF. The rifts expanded, shrinking the remaining segments of the STZ into the white ovals FA, BC, and DE. Ovals BC and DE merged in 1998, forming Oval BE. Then, in March 2000, BE and FA joined, forming Oval BA.

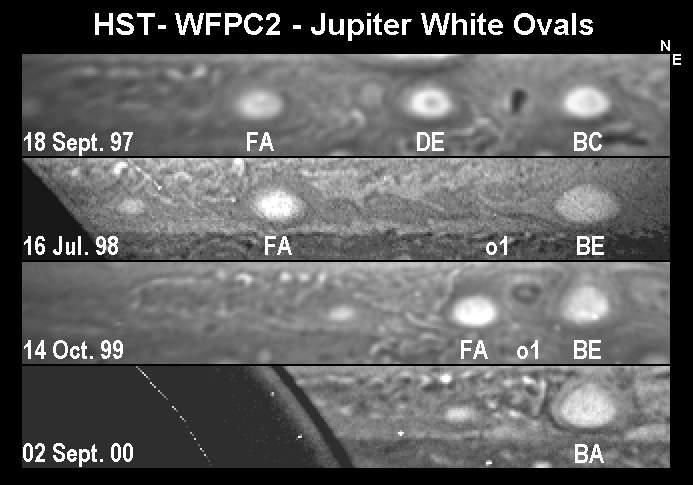
Formation of Oval BA from three white ovals

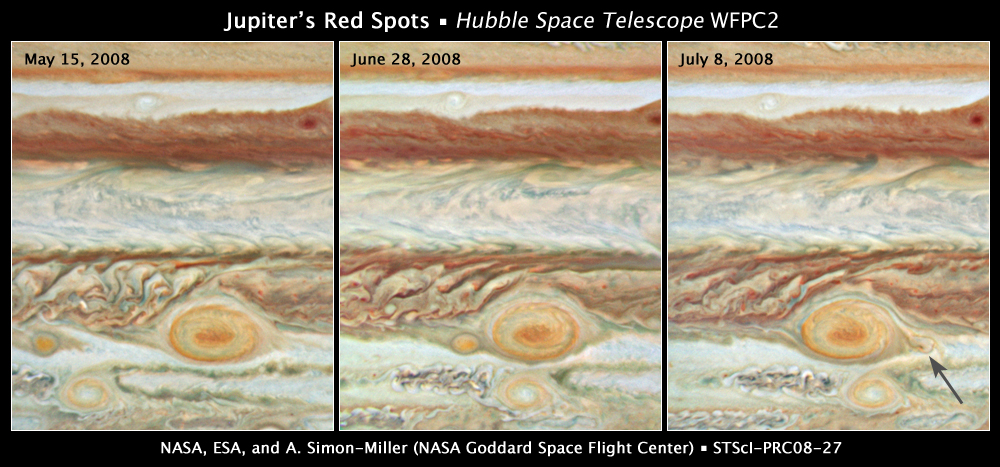
Oval BA (bottom), Great Red Spot (top) and "Baby Red Spot" (middle) during a brief encounter in June, 2008

Oval BA slowly began to turn red in August 2005. On February 24, 2006, amateur astronomer Christopher Go discovered the color change, noting that it had reached the same shade as the GRS. As a result, NASA writer Dr. Tony Phillips suggested it be called "Red Spot Jr." or "Red Jr."

In April 2006, a team of astronomers, believing that Oval BA might converge with the GRS that year, observed the storms through the Hubble Space Telescope. The storms pass each other about every two years, but the passings of 2002 and 2004 did not produce anything exciting. Dr. Amy Simon-Miller, of the Goddard Space Flight Center, predicted the storms would have their closest passing on July 4, 2006. On July 20, the two storms were photographed passing each other by the Gemini Observatory without converging.

Why Oval BA turned red is not well understood. According to a 2008 study by Dr. Santiago Pérez-Hoyos of the University of the Basque Country, the most likely mechanism is "an upward and inward diffusion of either a colored compound or a coating vapor that may interact later with high energy solar photons at the upper levels of Oval BA." Some believe that small storms (and their corresponding white spots) on Jupiter turn red when the winds become powerful enough to draw certain gases from deeper within the atmosphere which change color when those gases are exposed to sunlight.

Oval BA is getting stronger according to observations made with the Hubble Space Telescope in 2007. The wind speeds have reached 618 km/h; about the same as in the Great Red Spot and far stronger than any of the progenitor storms. As of July 2008, its size was about the diameter of Earth—approximately half the size of the Great Red Spot.

Oval BA was seen to lose its red colour towards the end of 2018, a change which was observed by Juno.

Oval BA should not be confused with another major storm on Jupiter, the South Tropical Little Red Spot (LRS) (nicknamed "the Baby Red Spot" by NASA), which was destroyed by the GRS. The new storm, previously a white spot in Hubble images, turned red in May 2008. The observations were led by Imke de Pater of the University of California, at Berkeley, US. The Baby Red Spot encountered the GRS in late June to early July 2008, and in the course of a collision, the smaller red spot was shredded into pieces. The remnants of the Baby Red Spot first orbited, then were later consumed by the GRS. The last of the remnants with a reddish color to have been identified by astronomers had disappeared by mid-July, and the remaining pieces again collided with the GRS, then finally merged with the bigger storm. The remaining pieces of the Baby Red Spot had completely disappeared by August 2008. During this encounter Oval BA was present nearby, but played no apparent role in the destruction of the Baby Red Spot.

=== Storms and lightning ===
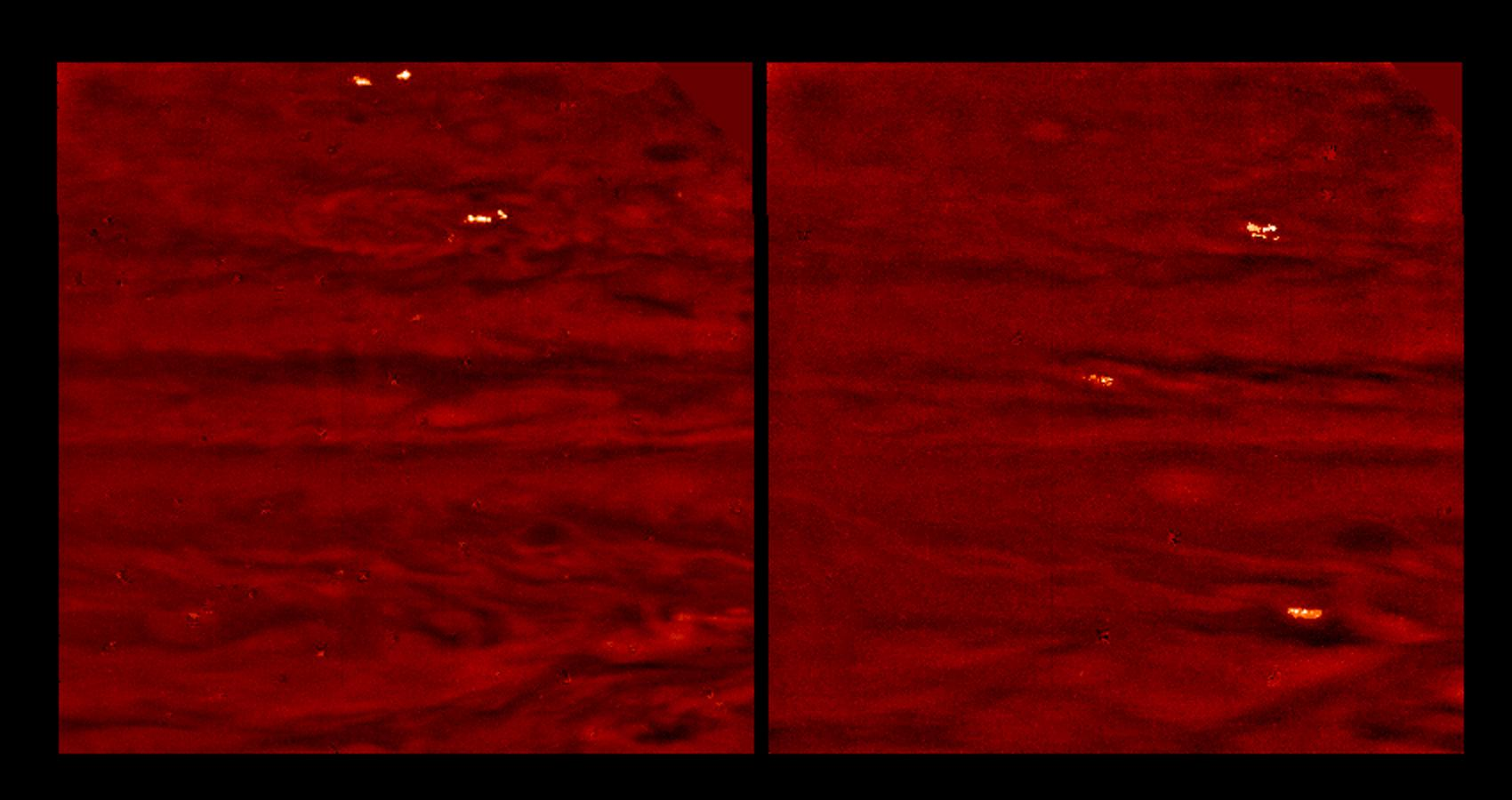
Lightning on Jupiter's night side, imaged by the Galileo orbiter in 1997

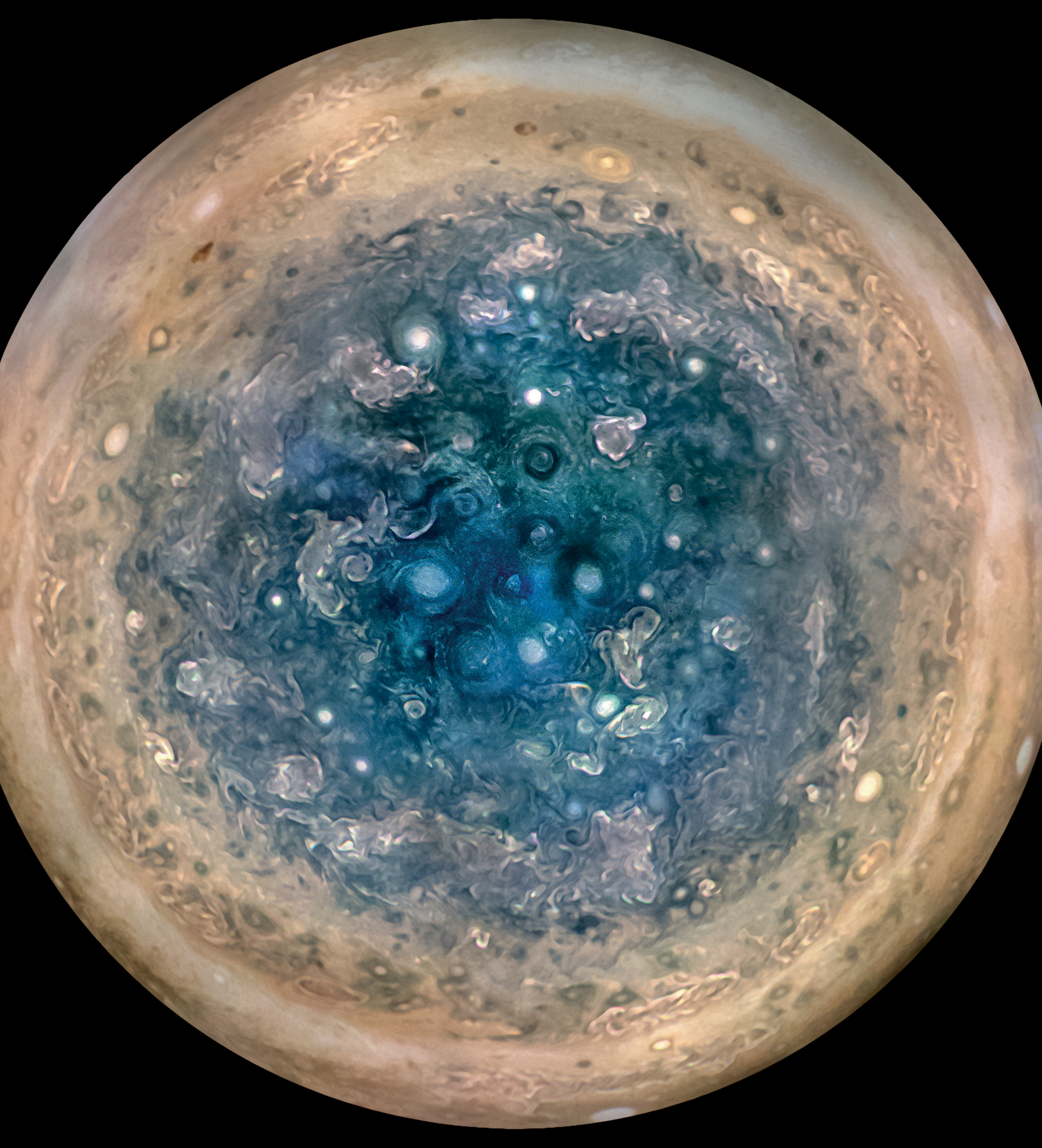
Jupiter's southern storms, from JunoCam. False color image.

The storms on Jupiter are similar to thunderstorms on Earth. They reveal themselves via bright clumpy clouds about 1000 km in size, which appear from time to time in the belts' cyclonic regions, especially within the strong westward (retrograde) jets. In contrast to vortices, storms are short-lived phenomena; the strongest of them may exist for several months, while the average lifetime is only 3–4 days. They are believed to be due mainly to moist convection within Jupiter's troposphere. Storms are actually tall convective columns (plumes), which bring the wet air from the depths to the upper part of the troposphere, where it condenses in clouds. A typical vertical extent of Jovian storms is about 100 km; as they extend from a pressure level of about 5–7 bar, where the base of a hypothetical water cloud layer is located, to as high as 0.2–0.5 bar.

Storms on Jupiter are always associated with lightning. The imaging of the night–side hemisphere of Jupiter by Galileo and Cassini spacecraft revealed regular light flashes in Jovian belts and near the locations of the westward jets, particularly at 51°N, 56°S and 14°S latitudes. On Jupiter lightning strikes are on average a few times more powerful than those on Earth. However, they are less frequent; the light power emitted from a given area is similar to that on Earth. A few flashes have been detected in polar regions, making Jupiter the second known planet after Earth to exhibit polar lightning. A Microwave Radiometer (Juno) detected many more in 2018.

Every 15–17 years Jupiter is marked by especially powerful storms. They appear at 23°N latitude, where the strongest eastward jet, that can reach 150 m/s, is located. The last time such an event was observed was in March–June 2007. Two storms appeared in the northern temperate belt 55° apart in longitude. They significantly disturbed the belt. The dark material that was shed by the storms mixed with clouds and changed the belt's color. The storms moved with a speed as high as 170 m/s, slightly faster than the jet itself, hinting at the existence of strong winds deep in the atmosphere.^{[d]}

=== Circumpolar cyclones ===
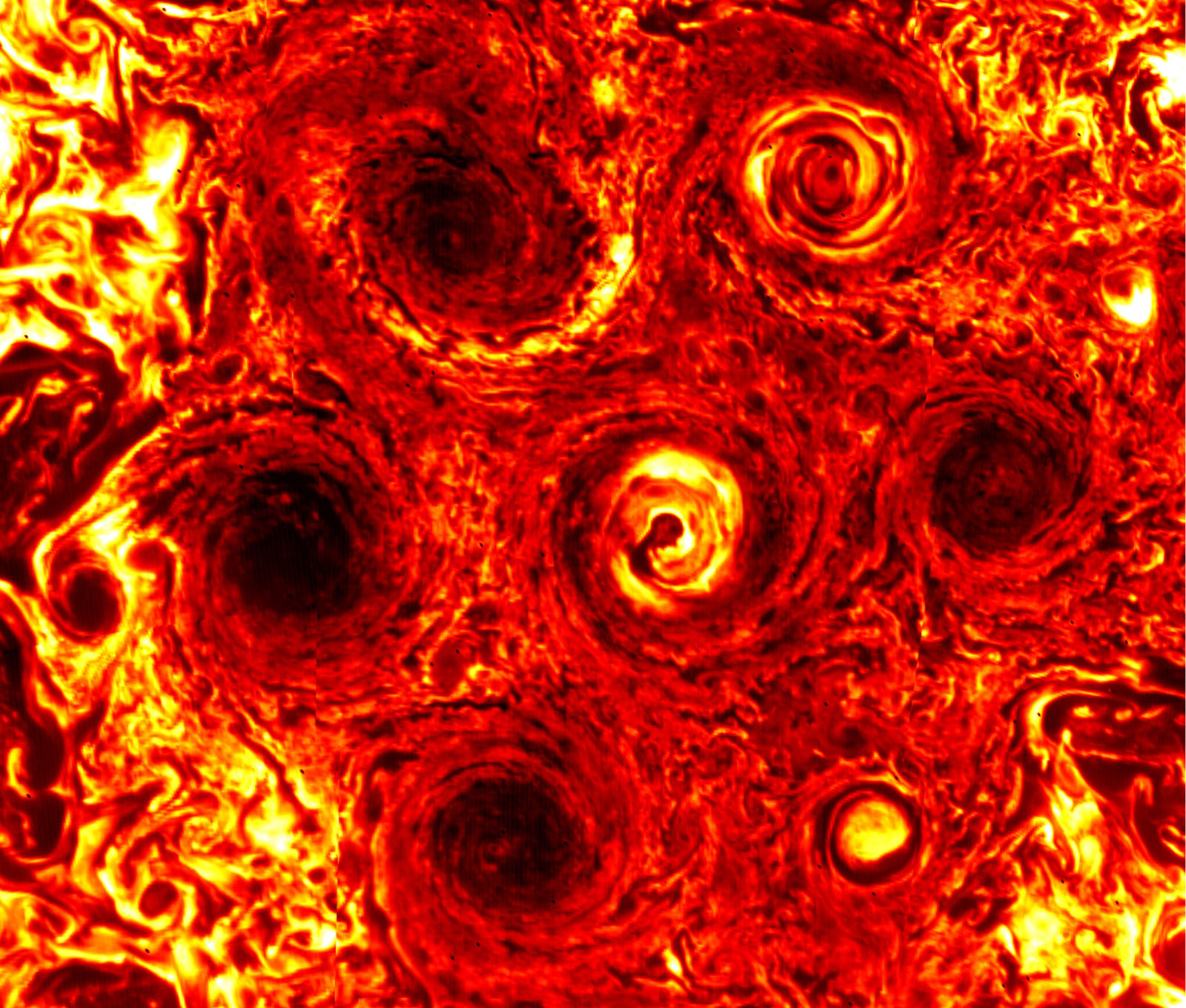
False colored JIRAM image of southern CPCs

Other notable features of Jupiter are its cyclones near the northern and southern poles of the planet. These are called circumpolar cyclones (CPCs) and they have been observed by the Juno Spacecraft using JunoCam and JIRAM. The cyclones have now been observed for about 5 years, as Juno completed 39 orbits around Jupiter. The northern pole has eight cyclones moving around a central cyclone (NPC) while the southern pole only has five cyclones around a central cyclone (SPC), with a gap between the first and second cyclones. The cyclones look like the hurricanes on Earth with trailing spiral arms and a denser center, although there are differences between the centers depending on the individual cyclone. Northern CPCs generally maintain their shape and position compared to the southern CPCs and this could be due to the faster wind speeds that are experienced in the south, where the maximum wind velocities are around 80 to 90 m/s. Although there is more movement among the southern CPCs they tend to retain the pentagonal structure relative to the pole. It has also been observed that the angular wind velocity increases as the center is approached and radius becomes smaller, except for one cyclone in the north, which may have rotation in the opposite direction. The difference in the number of cyclones in the north compared to the south is probably due to the size of the cyclones. The southern CPCs tend to be bigger with radii ranging from 5,600 to 7,000 km while northern CPCs range from 4,000 to 4,600 km.

The mechanism for the stability of these two symmetric structures of cyclones is an outcome of Beta-drift, a known effect causing cyclones to move poleward and anti-cyclones to move equatorward due to the conservation of momentum along streamlines in a vortex, under the change of the Coriolis parameter. Thus, cyclones forming in the polar regions may congregate at the pole and form a polar cyclone such as those observed on Saturn's poles. The polar cyclone (the central cyclone in the polygons) also emit a vorticity field which can repel other cyclones (see Fujiwhara effect) similar to the beta-effect. The latitude where the circumpolar cyclones are positioned (~84°) fits, in calculations, the hypothesis that the poleward beta-drift force balances the equatorward rejection of the polar cyclone on the circumpolar cyclones, assuming they have an anticyclonic ring around them, consistent with model simulations and observations.

The northern cyclones tend to maintain an octagonal structure with the NPC as a center point. Northern cyclones have less data than southern cyclones because of limited illumination in the north-polar winter, making it difficult for JunoCam to obtain accurate measurements of northern CPC positions at each perijove (53 days), but JIRAM is able to collect enough data to understand the northern CPCs. The limited illumination makes it difficult to see the northern central cyclone, but by making four orbits, the NPC can be partially seen and the octagonal structure of the cyclones can be identified. Limited illumination also makes it difficult to view the motion of the cyclones, but early observations show that the NPC is offset from the pole by about 0.5° and the CPCs generally maintained their position around the center. Despite data being harder to obtain, it has been observed that the northern CPCs have a drift rate of about 1° to 2.5° per perijove to the west. The seventh cyclone in the north (n7) drifts a little more than the others and this is due to an anticyclonic white oval (AWO) that pulls it farther from the NPC, which causes the octagonal shape to be slightly distorted.

The instantaneous locations of the south polar cyclones have been tracked for 5 years by the JIRAM instrument and by JunoCam. The locations over time were revealed to form an oscillatory motion of each of the 6 cyclones, with periods of approximately one (Earth) year and radii of about 400 km. These oscillations around the CPCs' mean positions were explained to be a result of imbalances between the beta-drift, pulling the CPCs toward the pole and the rejection forces that develop due to the interactions between the cyclones, similar to a 6-body spring system. In addition to this periodic motion, the south polar cyclones were observed to drift westward by 7.5°/year±0.7°/year. The reason for this drift is still unknown.

The circumpolar cyclones have different morphologies, especially in the north, where cyclones have a "filled" or "chaotic" structure. The inner part of the "chaotic" cyclones have small-scale cloud streaks and flecks. The "filled" cyclones have a sharply-bound, lobate area that is bright white near the edge with a dark inner portion. There are four "filled" cyclones and four "chaotic" cyclones in the north. The southern cyclones all have an extensive fine-scale spiral structure on their outside but they all differ in size and shape. There is very little observation of the cyclones due to low sun angles and a haze that is typically over the atmosphere but what little has been observed shows the cyclones to be a reddish color.

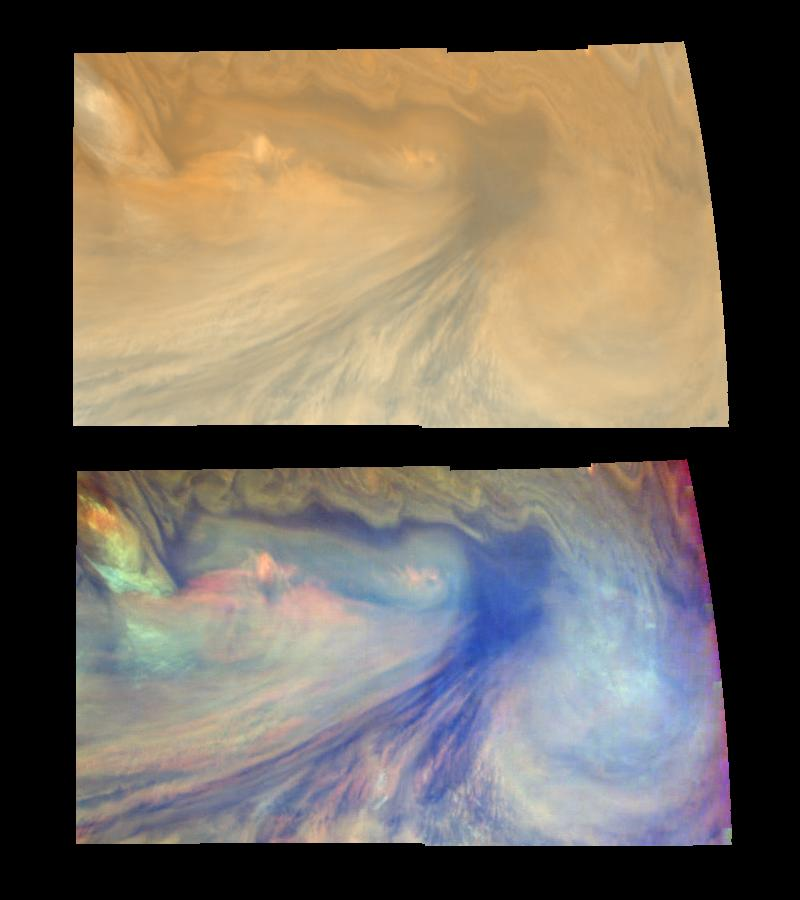
True color (top) and false color image (bottom) of an equatorial hot spot on Jupiter

=== Disturbances ===
The normal pattern of bands and zones is sometimes disrupted for periods of time. One particular class of disruption are long-lived darkenings of the South Tropical Zone, normally referred to as "South Tropical Disturbances" (STD). The longest lived STD in recorded history was followed from 1901 until 1939, having been first seen by Percy B. Molesworth on February 28, 1901. It took the form of darkening over part of the normally bright South Tropical zone. Several similar disturbances in the South Tropical Zone have been recorded since then.

=== Hot spots ===
Some of the most mysterious features in the atmosphere of Jupiter are hot spots. In them, the air is relatively free of clouds and heat can escape from the depths without much absorption. The spots look like bright spots in the infrared images obtained at the wavelength of about 5 μm. They are preferentially located in the belts, although there is a train of prominent hot spots at the northern edge of the Equatorial Zone. The Galileo Probe descended into one of those equatorial spots. Each equatorial spot is associated with a bright cloudy plume located to the west of it and reaching up to 10,000 km in size. Hot spots generally have round shapes, although they do not resemble vortices.

The origin of hot spots is not clear. They can be either downdrafts, where the descending air is adiabatically heated and dried or, alternatively, they can be a manifestation of planetary scale waves. The latter hypotheses explains the periodical pattern of the equatorial spots.

=== The possibility of life ===
In 1953, the Miller–Urey experiment proved that the combination of lightning and compounds existing in the primitive Earth's atmosphere can form organic matter (including amino acids), which can be used as the cornerstone of life. The simulated atmosphere consists of water, methane, ammonia and hydrogen molecules; all of these substances are found in today's Jupiter atmosphere. Jupiter's atmosphere has a strong vertical air flow that carries these compounds into lower regions. But there are higher temperatures inside Jupiter, which will decompose these chemicals and hinder the formation of life similar to Earth. This was speculated by Carl Sagan and Edwin E. Salpeter.

== Observational history ==
Time-lapse sequence from the approach of Voyager 1 to Jupiter, 1979.

Early modern astronomers, using small telescopes, recorded the changing appearance of Jupiter's atmosphere. Their descriptive terms—belts and zones, brown spots and red spots, plumes, barges, festoons, and streamers—are still used. Other terms such as vorticity, vertical motion, cloud heights have entered in use later, in the 20th century.

The first observations of the Jovian atmosphere at higher resolution than possible with Earth-based telescopes were taken by the Pioneer 10 and Pioneer 11 spacecraft. The first truly detailed images of Jupiter's atmosphere were provided by the Voyagers. The two spacecraft were able to image details at a resolution as low as 5 km in size in various spectra, and also able to create "approach movies" of the atmosphere in motion. The Galileo Probe, which suffered an antenna problem, saw less of Jupiter's atmosphere but at a better average resolution and a wider spectral bandwidth.

Today, astronomers have access to a continuous record of Jupiter's atmospheric activity thanks to telescopes such as Hubble Space Telescope. These show that the atmosphere is occasionally wracked by massive disturbances, but that, overall, it is remarkably stable. The vertical motion of Jupiter's atmosphere was largely determined by the identification of trace gases by ground-based telescopes. Spectroscopic studies after the collision of Comet Shoemaker–Levy 9 gave a glimpse of Jupiter's composition beneath the cloud tops. The presence of diatomic sulfur (S_{2}) and carbon disulfide (CS_{2}) was recorded—the first detection of either in Jupiter, and only the second detection of S_{2} in any astronomical object—together with other molecules such as ammonia (NH_{3}) and hydrogen sulfide (H_{2}S), while oxygen-bearing molecules such as sulfur dioxide were not detected, to the surprise of astronomers.

The Galileo atmospheric probe, as it plunged into Jupiter, measured the wind, temperature, composition, clouds, and radiation levels down to 22 bar. However, below 1 bar elsewhere on Jupiter there is uncertainty in the quantities.

=== Great Red Spot studies ===
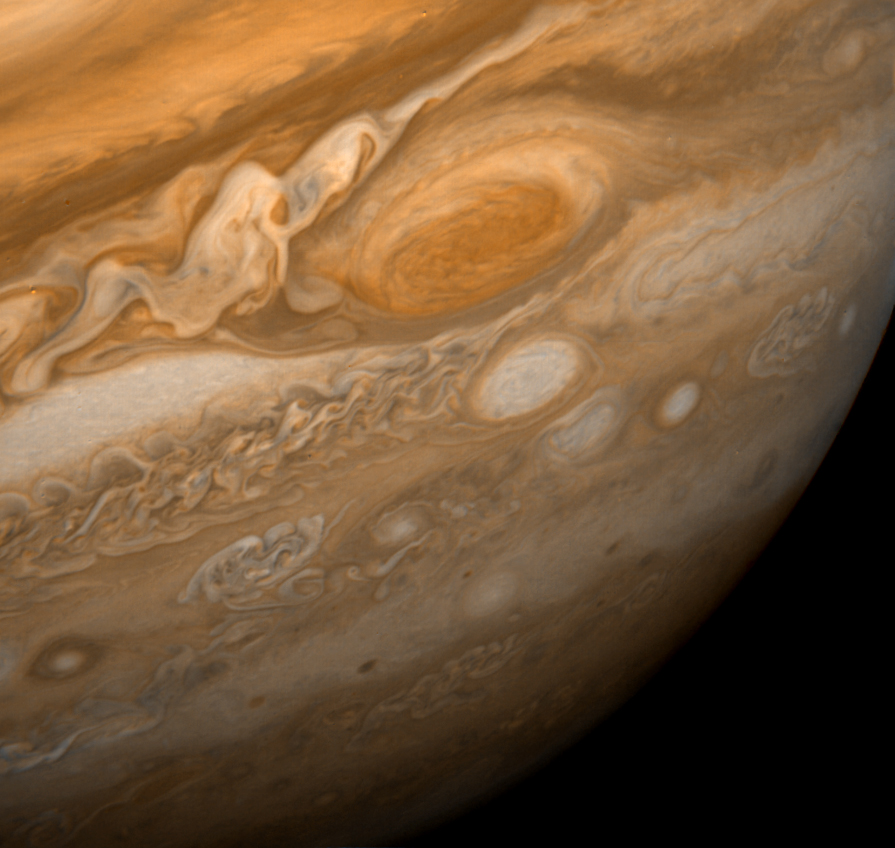
A narrower view of Jupiter and the Great Red Spot, as seen from Voyager 1 in 1979.

The first sighting of the GRS is often credited to Robert Hooke, who described a spot on the planet in May 1664; however, it is likely that Hooke's spot was in the wrong belt altogether (the North Equatorial Belt, versus the current location in the South Equatorial Belt). Much more convincing is Giovanni Cassini's description of a "permanent spot" in the following year. With fluctuations in visibility, Cassini's spot was observed from 1665 to 1713.

A minor mystery concerns a Jovian spot depicted around 1700 on a canvas by Donato Creti, which is exhibited in the Vatican. It is a part of a series of panels in which different (magnified) heavenly bodies serve as backdrops for various Italian scenes, the creation of all of them overseen by the astronomer Eustachio Manfredi for accuracy. Creti's painting is the first known to depict the GRS as red. No Jovian feature was officially described as red before the late 19th century.

The present GRS was first seen only after 1830 and well-studied only after a prominent apparition in 1879. A 118-year gap separates the observations made after 1830 from its 17th-century discovery; whether the original spot dissipated and re-formed, whether it faded, or even if the observational record was simply poor are unknown. The older spots had a short observational history and slower motion than that of the modern spot, which make their identity unlikely.

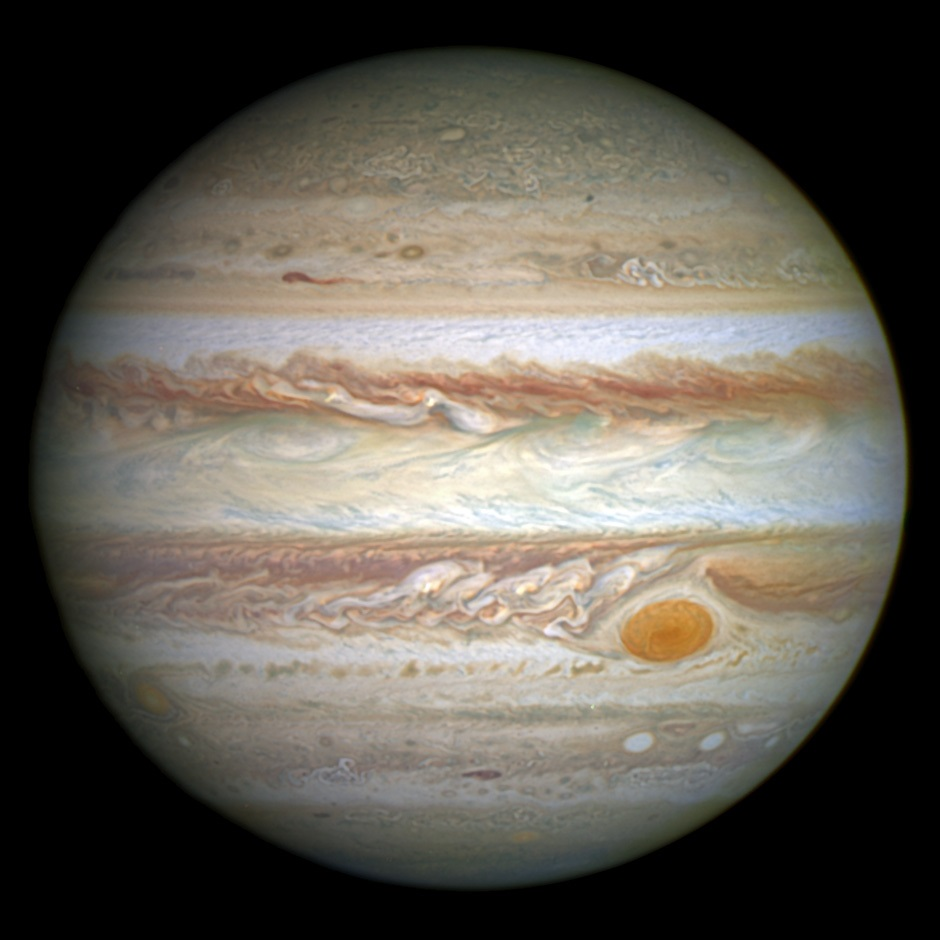
Hubble's Wide Field Camera 3 took the GRS region at its smallest size ever. Color and contrast are highly exaggerated.

On February 25, 1979, when the Voyager 1 spacecraft was 9.2 million kilometers from Jupiter it transmitted the first detailed image of the Great Red Spot back to Earth. Cloud details as small as 160 km across were visible. The colorful, wavy cloud pattern seen to the west (left) of the GRS is the spot's wake region, where extraordinarily complex and variable cloud motions are observed.

=== White ovals in the South Temperate Zone ===
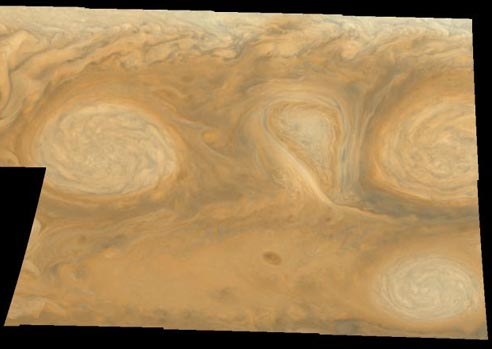
The white ovals that later formed Oval BA, imaged by the Galileo orbiter in 1997

A trio of long-lived white ovals formed around 1940 in the South Temperate Zone. In 1939 three small dark segments developed in the STZ, dividing it into three long lighter-colored bands. The dark segments quickly expanded, and over the 1940s the white regions shrunk to ovals. Elmer J. Reese named the dark segments AB, CD, and EF, and the white segments between them BC, DE, and FA. In the early 1940s, the white segments shrank to ovals which spanned a region of roughly 90 degrees of longitude, and were referred to as 'white ovals'. The ovals contracted rapidly during their first decade, then more slowly, finally settling to a stable region 10 degrees wide by 1965. As they shrank, they migrated north and became embedded in the South Temperate Belt, "digging" a niche in the STB. Indeed, much like the GRS, their circulations were confined by two opposing jet streams on their northern and southern boundaries, with an eastward jet to their north and a retrograde westward one to the south.

The longitudinal movement of the ovals seemed to be influenced by two factors: Jupiter's position in its orbit (they became faster at aphelion), and their proximity to the GRS (they accelerated when within 50 degrees of the Spot). The overall trend of the white oval drift rate was deceleration, with a decrease by half between 1940 and 1990.

During the Voyager fly-bys, the ovals extended roughly 9,000 km from east to west, 5,000 km from north to south, and rotated every five days (compared to six for the GRS at the time).

Starting in 1998, the three ovals began to merge together. First ovals DE and FA merged into oval DA, and then in 2000 ovals BC and DA merged into oval BA. Oval BA started to redden in 2005, was red from 2006 to 2008, then gradually faded back to white by 2019.

== See also ==
- Comet Shoemaker–Levy 9
- Extrasolar planet (many larger than Jupiter)
- Galileo Spacecraft (a mission that included both an orbiter and an atmospheric-entry probe)
- Juno probe
- 2009 Jupiter impact event
- 2010 Jupiter impact event
- Ulysses (spacecraft)
- Voyager 1, Voyager 2

== Notes ==
1. The scale height h_{s} is defined as h_{s} = (R⋅T)/(M⋅g_{j}), where: R ≈ 8.314 J⋅mol^{−1}⋅K^{−1} is the gas constant; M ≈ 0.0023 kg⋅mol^{−1} is the average molar mass in the Jovian atmosphere; T is temperature; and g_{j} ≈ 25 m/s^{2} is the gravitational acceleration at the surface of Jupiter. As the temperature varies from 110 K in the tropopause up to 1000 K in the thermosphere, the scale height can assume values from 15 to 150 km.
2. The Galileo atmospheric probe failed to measure the deep abundance of oxygen, because the water concentration continued to increase down to the pressure level of 22 bar, when it ceased operating. While the actually measured oxygen abundances are much lower than the solar value, the observed rapid increase of water content of the atmosphere with depth makes it likely that the deep abundance of oxygen exceeds the solar value by a factor of about 3, similar to the relative abundance of C, N, and S.
3. Various explanations of the overabundance of carbon, oxygen, nitrogen and other elements have been proposed. The leading one is that Jupiter captured a large number of icy planetesimals during the later stages of its accretion. The volatiles like noble gases are thought to have been trapped as clathrate hydrates in water ice.
4. NASA's Hubble Space Telescope recorded on 25 August 2020, a storm traveling around the planet at 350 miles per hour (560 km/h). In addition, researches from the California Institute of Technology reported that storms on Jupiter are similar to those on Earth, which form close to the equator, then move towards the poles. However, Jupiter's storms do not experience any friction from the land or oceans; hence, they drift until they reach the poles, which generate the so-called polygon storms.

== Cited sources ==
- Adem, Julián (August 1956). "A Series Solution for the Barotropic Vorticity Equation and its Application in the Study of Atmospheric Vortices". Tellus. 8 (3). Stockholm University Press: 364–372. Bibcode:1956Tell....8..364A. doi:10.1111/j.2153-3490.1956.tb01234.x. ISSN 0040-2826.
- Adriani, A.; Mura, A.; Orton, G.; Hansen, C.; Altieri, F.; Moriconi, M. L.; Rogers, J.; Eichstädt, G.; Momary, T.; Ingersoll, A. P.; Filacchione, G. (March 2018). "Clusters of cyclones encircling Jupiter's poles". Nature. 555 (7695): 216–219. Bibcode:2018Natur.555..216A. doi:10.1038/nature25491. ISSN 0028-0836. PMID 29516997. S2CID 4438233.
- Atreya, Sushil K.; Mahaffy, P. R.; Niemann, H. B.; Wong, M. H.; Owen, T. C. (February 2003). "Composition and origin of the atmosphere of Jupiter—an update, and implications for the extrasolar giant planets". Planetary and Space Science. 51 (2): 105–112. Bibcode:2003P&SS...51..105A. doi:10.1016/S0032-0633(02)00144-7. ISSN 0032-0633.
- Atreya, Sushil K.; Wong, Ah-San (2005). "Coupled Clouds and Chemistry of the Giant Planets — A Case for Multiprobes" (PDF). Space Science Reviews. 116 (1–2): 121–136. Bibcode:2005SSRv..116..121A. doi:10.1007/s11214-005-1951-5. hdl:2027.42/43766. ISSN 0032-0633. S2CID 31037195.
- Atreya, Sushil K.; Wong, Ah-San; Baines, K. H.; Wong, M. H.; Owen, T. C. (2005b). "Jupiter's ammonia clouds—localized or ubiquitous?" (PDF). Planetary and Space Science. 53 (5): 498–507. Bibcode:2005P&SS...53..498A. doi:10.1016/j.pss.2004.04.002. ISSN 0032-0633.
- Atreya, Sushil K.; Wong, M. H.; Owen, T. C.; Mahaffy, P. R.; Niemann, H. B.; de Pater, I.; Drossart, P.; Encrenaz, T. (October–November 1999). "A comparison of the atmospheres of Jupiter and Saturn: Deep atmospheric composition, cloud structure, vertical mixing, and origin". Planetary and Space Science. 47 (10–11): 1243–1262. Bibcode:1999P&SS...47.1243A. doi:10.1016/S0032-0633(99)00047-1. ISSN 0032-0633. PMID 11543193.
- Bagenal, Fran; Dowling, Timothy E.; McKinnon, William B., eds. (2004). Jupiter: The Planet, Satellites and Magnetosphere. Cambridge Planetary Science. Cambridge: Cambridge University Press. ISBN 978-0-521-81808-7.
  - Ingersoll, A. P.; Dowling, T. E.; Gierasch, P. J. "Dynamics of Jupiter's Atmosphere". In Bagenal, Dowling & McKinnon (2004).
  - West, R. A.; Baines, K. H.; Friedson, A. J. "Jovian Clouds and Haze". In Bagenal, Dowling & McKinnon (2004).
  - Yelle, R. V.; Miller, S. "Jupiter's Thermosphere and Ionosphere". In Bagenal, Dowling & McKinnon (2004).
- Baines, Kevin H.; Simon-Miller, Amy A.; Orton, Glenn S.; Weaver, Harold A.; Lunsford, Allen; Momary, Thomas W.; Spencer, John; Cheng, Andrew F.; Reuter, Dennis C. (12 October 2007). "Polar Lightning and Decadal-Scale Cloud Variability on Jupiter". Science. 318 (5848): 226–229. Bibcode:2007Sci...318..226B. doi:10.1126/science.1147912. PMID 17932285. S2CID 28540751.
- Beatty, J. K. (2002). "Jupiter's Shrinking Red Spot". Sky and Telescope. 103 (4): 24. Bibcode:2002S&T...103d..24B. Archived from the original on 2011-05-27.
- Becker, Heidi N.; Alexander, James W.; Atreya, Sushil K.; Bolton, Scott J.; Brennan, Martin J.; Brown, Shannon T.; Guillaume, Alexandre; Guillot, Tristan; Ingersoll, Andrew P.; Levin, Steven M.; Lunine, Jonathan I. (5 August 2020). "Small lightning flashes from shallow electrical storms on Jupiter". Nature. 584 (7819): 55–58. Bibcode:2020Natur.584...55B. doi:10.1038/s41586-020-2532-1. ISSN 1476-4687. PMID 32760043. S2CID 220980694.
- Beebe, R. (1997). Jupiter the Giant Planet (2nd ed.). Washington: Smithsonian Books. ISBN 978-1-56098-685-0. OCLC 224014042.
- Bhardwaj, Anil; Gladstone, G. Randall (2000). "Auroral emissions of the giant planets". Reviews of Geophysics. 38 (3): 295–353. Bibcode:2000RvGeo..38..295B. doi:10.1029/1998RG000046.
- Busse, F. H. (1976). "A simple model of convection in the Jovian atmosphere". Icarus. 29 (2): 255–260. Bibcode:1976Icar...29..255B. doi:10.1016/0019-1035(76)90053-1.
- Duer, Keren; Gavriel, Nimrod; Galanti, Eli; Kaspi, Yohai; Fletcher, Leigh N.; Guillot, Tristan; Bolton, Scott J.; Levin, Steven M.; Atreya, Sushil K.; Grassi, Davide; Ingersoll, Andrew P. (2021-12-16). "Evidence for Multiple Ferrel-Like Cells on Jupiter". Geophysical Research Letters. 48 (23) e2021GL095651. arXiv:2110.07255. Bibcode:2021GeoRL..4895651D. doi:10.1029/2021GL095651. hdl:2027.42/170953. ISSN 0094-8276. S2CID 238856819.
- Encrenaz, Thérèse (February 2003). "ISO observations of the giant planets and Titan: what have we learnt?". Planetary and Space Science. 51 (2): 89–103. Bibcode:2003P&SS...51...89E. doi:10.1016/S0032-0633(02)00145-9.
- Fletcher, Leigh N.; Kaspi, Yohai; Guillot, Tristan; Showman, Adam P. (2020-03-12). "How Well Do We Understand the Belt/Zone Circulation of Giant Planet Atmospheres?". Space Science Reviews. 216 (2): 30. arXiv:1907.01822. Bibcode:2020SSRv..216...30F. doi:10.1007/s11214-019-0631-9. ISSN 1572-9672. PMC 7067733. PMID 32214508.
- Fletcher, Leigh N.; Orton, G. S.; Mousis, O.; Yanamandra-Fisher, P.; Parrish, P. D.; Irwin, P. G. J.; Fisher, B. M.; Vanzi, L.; Fujiyoshi, T. (2010). "Thermal structure and composition of Jupiter's Great Red Spot from high-resolution thermal imaging" (PDF). Icarus. 208 (1): 306–328. Bibcode:2010Icar..208..306F. doi:10.1016/j.icarus.2010.01.005.
- Galanti, Eli; Kaspi, Yohai; Duer, Keren; Fletcher, Leigh; Ingersoll, Andrew P.; Li, Cheng; Orton, Glenn S.; Guillot, Tristan; Levin, Steven M.; Bolton, Scott J. (2021). "Constraints on the Latitudinal Profile of Jupiter's Deep Jets". Geophysical Research Letters. 48 (9) e2021GL092912. arXiv:2102.10595. Bibcode:2021GeoRL..4892912G. doi:10.1029/2021GL092912. hdl:2027.42/167748. ISSN 0094-8276. S2CID 231985747.
- Gavriel, Nimrod; Kaspi, Yohai (August 2021). "The number and location of Jupiter's circumpolar cyclones explained by vorticity dynamics". Nature Geoscience. 14 (8): 559–563. arXiv:2110.09422. Bibcode:2021NatGe..14..559G. doi:10.1038/s41561-021-00781-6. ISSN 1752-0908. S2CID 236096014.
- Gavriel, Nimrod; Kaspi, Yohai (2022-08-16). "The Oscillatory Motion of Jupiter's Polar Cyclones Results From Vorticity Dynamics". Geophysical Research Letters. 49 (15) e2022GL098708. arXiv:2209.00309. Bibcode:2022GeoRL..4998708G. doi:10.1029/2022GL098708. ISSN 0094-8276. S2CID 249810436.
- Giles, Rohini S.; Greathouse, Thomas K.; Bonfond, Bertrand; Gladstone, G. Randall; Kammer, Joshua A.; Hue, Vincent; Grodent, Denis C.; Gérard, Jean-Claude; Versteeg, Maarten H.; Wong, Michael H.; Bolton, Scott J. (2020). "Possible Transient Luminous Events Observed in Jupiter's Upper Atmosphere". Journal of Geophysical Research: Planets. 125 (11) e2020JE006659. arXiv:2010.13740. Bibcode:2020JGRE..12506659G. doi:10.1029/2020JE006659. hdl:2268/252816. ISSN 2169-9100. S2CID 225075904.
- Go, C. Y.; de Pater, I.; Wong, M.; Lockwood, S.; Marcus, P.; Asay-Davis, X.; Shetty, S. (2006). "Evolution Of The Oval Ba During 2004–2005". Bulletin of the American Astronomical Society. 38: 495. Bibcode:2006DPS....38.1102G.
- Graney, C. M. (2010). "Changes in the Cloud Belts of Jupiter, 1630–1664, as reported in the 1665 Astronomia Reformata of Giovanni Battista Riccioli". Baltic Astronomy. 19 (3–4): 266. arXiv:1008.0566. Bibcode:2010BaltA..19..265G. doi:10.1515/astro-2017-0425. S2CID 117677021.
- Grassi, D.; Adriani, A.; Moriconi, M. L.; Mura, A.; Tabataba-Vakili, F.; Ingersoll, A.; Orton, G.; Hansen, C.; Altieri, F.; Filacchione, G.; Sindoni, G. (June 2018). "First Estimate of Wind Fields in the Jupiter Polar Regions From JIRAM-Juno Images". Journal of Geophysical Research: Planets. 123 (6): 1511–1524. Bibcode:2018JGRE..123.1511G. doi:10.1029/2018JE005555. hdl:2027.42/145242. ISSN 2169-9097. S2CID 133852380.
- Guillot, T. (1999). "A comparison of the interiors of Jupiter and Saturn". Planetary and Space Science. 47 (10–11): 1183–1200. arXiv:astro-ph/9907402. Bibcode:1999P&SS...47.1183G. doi:10.1016/S0032-0633(99)00043-4. S2CID 19024073.
- Hammel, H. B.; Lockwood, G. W.; Mills, J. R.; Barnet, C. D. (1995). "Hubble Space Telescope Imaging of Neptune's Cloud Structure in 1994". Science. 268 (5218): 1740–1742. Bibcode:1995Sci...268.1740H. doi:10.1126/science.268.5218.1740. PMID 17834994. S2CID 11688794.
- Heimpel, M.; Aurnou, J.; Wicht, J. (2005). "Simulation of equatorial and high-latitude jets on Jupiter in a deep convection model". Nature. 438 (7065): 193–196. Bibcode:2005Natur.438..193H. doi:10.1038/nature04208. PMID 16281029. S2CID 4414668.
- Hockey, T. (1999). Galileo's Planet: Observing Jupiter Before Photography. Bristol, Philadelphia: Institute of Physics Publishing. ISBN 978-0-7503-0448-1. OCLC 39733730.
- Holton, James R., ed. (2004). An Introduction to Dynamic Meteorology (4th ed.). Burlington, Massachusetts: Elsevier Academic Press. ISBN 978-0-08-047021-4. OCLC 162572802.
- Ingersoll, A. P.; Cuzzi, J. N. (1969). "Dynamics of Jupiter's cloud bands" (PDF). Journal of the Atmospheric Sciences. 26 (5): 981–985. Bibcode:1969JAtS...26..981I. doi:10.1175/1520-0469(1969)026<0981:DOJCB>2.0.CO;2.
- Ingersoll, A. P.; Gierasch, P. J.; Banfield, D.; Vasavada, A. R.; Galileo Imaging Team (2000). "Moist convection as an energy source for the large-scale motions in Jupiter's atmosphere". Nature. 403 (6770): 630–632. Bibcode:2000Natur.403..630I. doi:10.1038/35001021. ISSN 0028-0836. PMID 10688192. S2CID 4381087.
- Irwin, P. (2003). Giant Planets of Our Solar System. Atmospheres, Composition, and Structure. Springer Praxis. ISBN 978-3-540-00681-7.
- Janssen, M. A.; Oswald, J. E.; Brown, S. T.; Gulkis, S.; Levin, S. M.; Bolton, S. J.; Allison, M. D.; Atreya, S. K.; Gautier, D.; Ingersoll, A. P.; Lunine, J. I. (2017). "MWR: Microwave Radiometer for the Juno Mission to Jupiter". Space Science Reviews. 213 (1–4): 139–185. Bibcode:2017SSRv..213..139J. doi:10.1007/s11214-017-0349-5. ISSN 0038-6308. S2CID 125905820.
- Kaspi, Y.; Galanti, E.; Hubbard, W. B.; Stevenson, D. J.; Bolton, S. J.; Iess, L.; Guillot, T.; Bloxham, J.; Connerney, J. E. P.; Cao, H.; Durante, D. (2018-03-08). "Jupiter's atmospheric jet streams extend thousands of kilometres deep". Nature. 555 (7695): 223–226. Bibcode:2018Natur.555..223K. doi:10.1038/nature25793. hdl:11573/1091959. ISSN 0028-0836. PMID 29516995. S2CID 4120368.
- Kunde, V. G.; Flasar, F. M.; Jennings, D. E. (2004). "Jupiter's Atmospheric Composition from the Cassini Thermal Infrared Spectroscopy Experiment". Science. 305 (5690): 1582–1586. Bibcode:2004Sci...305.1582K. doi:10.1126/science.1100240. PMID 15319491. S2CID 45296656.
- Li, Cheng; Ingersoll, Andrew P.; Klipfel, Alexandra P.; Brettle, Harriet (2020-09-08). "Modeling the stability of polygonal patterns of vortices at the poles of Jupiter as revealed by the Juno spacecraft". Proceedings of the National Academy of Sciences. 117 (39): 24082–24087. Bibcode:2020PNAS..11724082L. doi:10.1073/pnas.2008440117. ISSN 0027-8424. PMC 7533696. PMID 32900956.
- Liu, Junjun; Schneider, Tapio (2010-11-01). "Mechanisms of Jet Formation on the Giant Planets". Journal of the Atmospheric Sciences. 67 (11): 3652–3672. arXiv:0910.3682. Bibcode:2010JAtS...67.3652L. doi:10.1175/2010JAS3492.1. ISSN 1520-0469. S2CID 9416783.
- Loeffler, Mark J.; Hudson, Reggie L. (2018). "Coloring Jupiter's clouds: Radiolysis of ammonium hydrosulfide (NH4SH)". Icarus. 302: 418–425. Bibcode:2018Icar..302..418L. doi:10.1016/j.icarus.2017.10.041.
- Low, F. J. (1966). "Observations of Venus, Jupiter, and Saturn at λ20 μ". Astronomical Journal. 71: 391. Bibcode:1966AJ.....71R.391L. doi:10.1086/110110.
- McKim, R. J. (1997). "P. B. Molesworth's discovery of the great South Tropical Disturbance on Jupiter, 1901". Journal of the British Astronomical Association. 107 (5): 239–245. Bibcode:1997JBAA..107..239M.
- Miller, Stanley L. (1953-05-15). "A Production of Amino Acids Under Possible Primitive Earth Conditions". Science. 117 (3046): 528–529. Bibcode:1953Sci...117..528M. doi:10.1126/science.117.3046.528. ISSN 0036-8075. PMID 13056598.
- Miller, Steve; Aylward, Alan; Millward, George (January 2005). "Giant Planet Ionospheres and Thermospheres: The Importance of Ion-Neutral Coupling". Space Science Reviews. 116 (1–2): 319–343. Bibcode:2005SSRv..116..319M. doi:10.1007/s11214-005-1960-4. S2CID 119906560.
- Mura, A.; Adriani, A.; Bracco, A.; Moriconi, M. L.; Grassi, D.; Plainaki, C.; Ingersoll, A.; Bolton, S.; Sordini, R.; Altieri, F.; Ciarravano, A.; Cicchetti, A.; Dinelli, B. M.; Filacchione, G.; Migliorini, A. (2021-07-28). "Oscillations and Stability of the Jupiter Polar Cyclones". Geophysical Research Letters. 48 (14) e2021GL094235. Bibcode:2021GeoRL..4894235M. doi:10.1029/2021GL094235. ISSN 0094-8276. S2CID 237698857.
- Mura, A.; Scarica, P.; Grassi, D.; Adriani, A.; Bracco, A.; Piccioni, G.; Sindoni, G.; Moriconi, M. L.; Plainaki, C.; Ingersoll, A.; Altieri, F.; Cicchetti, A.; Dinelli, B. M.; Filacchione, G.; Migliorini, A. (2022). "Five Years of Observations of the Circumpolar Cyclones of Jupiter". Journal of Geophysical Research: Planets. 127 (9) e2022JE007241. Bibcode:2022JGRE..12707241M. doi:10.1029/2022JE007241. ISSN 2169-9097. S2CID 252099924.
- Noll, K. S.; McGrath, M. A.; Weaver, H. A.; Yelle, R. V.; Trafton, L. M.; Atreya, S. K.; Caldwell, J. J.; Barnet, C.; Edgington, S. (1995). "HST Spectroscopic Observations of Jupiter Following the Impact of Comet Shoemaker-Levy 9". Science. 267 (5202): 1307–1313. Bibcode:1995Sci...267.1307N. doi:10.1126/science.7871428. PMID 7871428. S2CID 37686143.
- O'Neill, Morgan E.; Emanuel, Kerry A.; Flierl, Glenn R. (2015-06-15). "Polar vortex formation in giant-planet atmospheres due to moist convection". Nature Geoscience. 8 (7): 523–526. Bibcode:2015NatGe...8..523O. doi:10.1038/ngeo2459. hdl:1721.1/100773. ISSN 1752-0894.
- Pearl, J. C.; Conrath, B. J.; Hanel, R. A.; Pirraglia, J. A.; Coustenis, A. (March 1990). "The albedo, effective temperature, and energy balance of Uranus, as determined from Voyager IRIS data". Icarus. 84 (1): 12–28. Bibcode:1990Icar...84...12P. doi:10.1016/0019-1035(90)90155-3. ISSN 0019-1035.
- Reese, Elmer J.; Solberg, H. Gordon Jr. (1966). "Recent measures of the latitude and longitude of Jupiter's red spot". Icarus. 5 (1–6): 266–273. Bibcode:1966Icar....5..266R. doi:10.1016/0019-1035(66)90036-4. hdl:2060/19650022425.
- Ridpath, I. (1998). Norton's Star Atlas and Reference Handbook (19th ed.). Harlow: Addison Wesley Longman. p. 107. ISBN 978-0-582-35655-9.
- Rogers, John H. (1995). The Giant Planet Jupiter. Cambridge: Cambridge University Press. ISBN 978-0-521-41008-3. OCLC 219591510.
- Rogers, John H. (2003). "Jupiter in 1999/2000. II: Infrared wavelengths" (PDF). Journal of the British Astronomical Association. 113 (3): 136–140. Bibcode:2003JBAA..113..136R.
- Rogers, John H. (30 July 2006). "[9] Interim reports on STB (Oval BA passing GRS), STropB, GRS (internal rotation measured), EZ(S. Eq. Disturbance; dramatic darkening; NEB interactions), & NNTB". BAA Jupiter Section. British Astronomical Association.
- Rogers, John H. (2008a). "The accelerating circulation of Jupiter's Great Red Spot" (PDF). Journal of the British Astronomical Association. 118 (1): 14–20. Bibcode:2008JBAA..118...14R.
- Rogers, John H. (August 8, 2008b). "[5] The collision of the Little Red Spot and Great Red Spot: Part 2". BAA Jupiter Section. British Astronomical Association.
- Rogers, John; Eichstädt, Gerald; Hansen, Candice; Orton, Glenn; Momary, Thomas (2021). "Behaviour of Jupiter's polar polygons over 4 years". European Planetary Science Congress Abstracts. 15. Bibcode:2021EPSC...15...57R. doi:10.5194/epsc2021-57. S2CID 241446672.
- Rogers, John H.; Metig, H. J. (2001). "Jupiter in 1998/99" (PDF). Journal of the British Astronomical Association. 111 (6): 321–332. Bibcode:2001JBAA..111..321R.
- Rostami, Masoud; Fallah, Bijan; Fazel-Rastgar, Farahnaz (15 March 2025). "Dynamics of Jupiter's equatorial zone: Instability analysis and a mechanism for Y-shaped structures". Icarus. 429 116414. Elsevier. Bibcode:2025Icar..42916414R. doi:10.1016/j.icarus.2024.116414.
- Sanchez-Lavega, A.; Orton, G. S.; Hueso, S. (2008). "Depth of the strong Jovian jet from a planetary scale disturbance driven by storms". Nature. 451 (7177): 437–440. Bibcode:2008Natur.451..437S. doi:10.1038/nature06533. PMID 18216848.
- Sanchez-Lavega, A.; Orton, G. S.; Morales, R. (2001). "The Merger of Two Giant Anticyclones in the Atmosphere of Jupiter". Icarus. 149 (2): 491–495. Bibcode:2001Icar..149..491S. doi:10.1006/icar.2000.6548.
- Scott, R. K. (2010-09-15). "Polar accumulation of cyclonic vorticity". Geophysical & Astrophysical Fluid Dynamics. 105 (4–5): 409–420. doi:10.1080/03091929.2010.509927. ISSN 0309-1929. S2CID 2050846.
- Showman, Adam P.; de Pater, Imke (2005). "Dynamical implications of Jupiter's tropospheric ammonia abundance". Icarus. 174 (1): 192–204. Bibcode:2005Icar..174..192S. doi:10.1016/j.icarus.2004.10.004.
- Seiff, A.; Kirk, D. B.; Knight, T. C. D.; Young, R. E.; Mihalov, J. D.; Young, L. A.; Milos, F. S.; Schubert, G.; Blanchard, R. C.; Atkinson, D. (1 September 1998). "Thermal structure of Jupiter's atmosphere near the edge of a 5-μm hot spot in the north equatorial belt". Journal of Geophysical Research. 103 (E10): 22857–22889. Bibcode:1998JGR...10322857S. doi:10.1029/98JE01766.
- Smith, Bradford A.; Soderblom, Laurence A.; Johnson, Torrence V.; Ingersoll, Andrew P.; Collins, Stewart A.; Shoemaker, Eugene M.; Hunt, G. E.; Masursky, Harold; Carr, Michael H. (1979-06-01). "The Jupiter System Through the Eyes of Voyager 1". Science. 204 (4396): 951–957, 960–972. Bibcode:1979Sci...204..951S. doi:10.1126/science.204.4396.951. ISSN 0036-8075. PMID 17800430. S2CID 33147728.
- Stone, P. H. (1974). "On Jupiter's Rate of Rotation". Journal of the Atmospheric Sciences. 31 (5): 1471–1472. Bibcode:1974JAtS...31.1471S. doi:10.1175/1520-0469(1974)031<1471:OJROR>2.0.CO;2.
- Tabataba-Vakili, F.; Rogers, J. H.; Eichstädt, G.; Orton, G. S.; Hansen, C. J.; Momary, T. W.; Sinclair, J. A.; Giles, R. S.; Caplinger, M. A.; Ravine, M. A.; Bolton, S. J. (January 2020). "Long-term tracking of circumpolar cyclones on Jupiter from polar observations with JunoCam". Icarus. 335 113405. Bibcode:2020Icar..33513405T. doi:10.1016/j.icarus.2019.113405. ISSN 0019-1035. S2CID 202132980.
- Vasavada, A. R.; Showman, A. (2005). "Jovian atmospheric dynamics: An update after Galileo and Cassini". Reports on Progress in Physics. 68 (8): 1935–1996. Bibcode:2005RPPh...68.1935V. doi:10.1088/0034-4885/68/8/R06. S2CID 53596671.
- Wilson, Hugh F.; Militzer, Burkhard (22 March 2010). "Sequestration of Noble Gases in Giant Planet Interiors". Physical Review Letters. 104 (104) 121101. arXiv:1003.5940. Bibcode:2010PhRvL.104l1101W. doi:10.1103/PhysRevLett.104.121101. PMID 20366523.
