= Peter Gierasch =

American astronomer and astrophysicist (1941–2023)

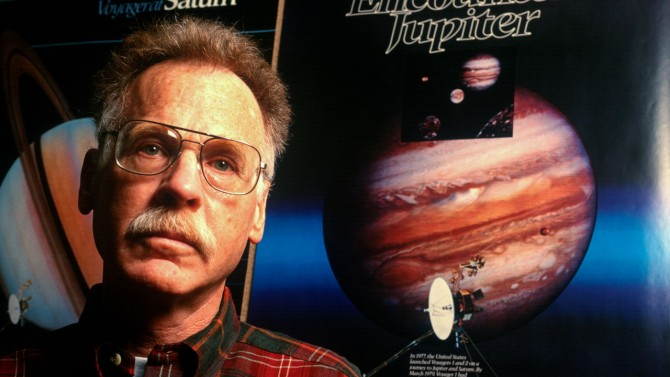
- Obituary image of Gierasch published by Cornell University
- Born: December 19, 1940; Needham, Massachusetts
- Died: January 20, 2023 (aged 82); Ithaca, New York
- Spouse: Maida Gierasch
- Children: Adam Gierasch; Amanda Gierasch
- Awards: Gerard P. Kuiper Prize

Academic background
- Education: Harvard University

Academic work
- Discipline: Astrophysics; Astronomy
- Sub-discipline: Planetary science
- Institutions: Cornell university NASA

Peter Jay Gierasch (19 December 1941 – 20 January 2023) was an American astronomer and astrophysicist.

== Life ==
In 1962, Peter Jay Gierasch received his bachelor's degree in physics from Harvard University. He continued his studies at his alma mater and immediately commenced working towards a Ph.D. in applied mathematics.

Through a mutual friend, Gierasch was introduced to his wife of 59 years, Maida Wiesenthal. They dated for six months before deciding to marry in June 1964.

In 1968, within the scope of a year, Gierasch finished his Ph.D. and promptly began his outstanding contribution to planetary sciences with the publishing of his first paper, "Martian thermal and dynamical structure (1968)". The paper focused on the astrobiology of Mars and the planet's atmospheric wind conditions and was an enormous success. The work was the first to ever apply a systematic approach to the analysis of the relationship between the Martian surface and the planetary atmospheric conditions, highlighting the contrast shown to Earth.

Gierasch published again in 1971, producing a comprehensive paper on the wind conditions of Mars with the astronomers Joseph Veverka and Carl Sagan. Three decades later, the theories presented by the paper were proved accurate by footage from exploration of the Martian atmosphere.

Gierasch joined the Cornell faculty as a professor of astronomy in 1972 and began for NASA as a scientist on the Voyager spectrometer team in 1973.

== Achievements ==
- Alfred P. Sloan Foundation Research Fellow from 1975 to 1979.
- Awarded the honor of an asteroid named after him (5153 Gierasch) and a seminar to honor his 60th birthday.
- Recipient of the 2014 Gerard P. Kuiper Prize
- Co-founder and leader of Cornell's Center for Radiophysics and Space Research (for ten years) With the help of his guidance and gentle leadership, the center became home to a NASA Regional Planetary Imaging Facility housing instrumentation such as parts of the Hale Telescope, the Spitzer Infrared Spectrograph, and SOFIA FORCAST.
- Contribution to the interplanetary missions Voyager, Pioneer, Galileo, Cassini, Viking, and more.

== Family ==
Gierasch was raised with two sisters, Molly Gierasch and Lila Gierasch. His mother, Marian Bookhout Gierasch, and sister Lila Gierasch studied at Mount Holyoke College. Lila followed Peter's footsteps and completed her post-graduate study at Harvard University.

Gierasch was married for 59 years to Maida Gierasch. They had two children; their eldest son Adam Gierasch followed by their daughter Amanda.

== Publications ==
Throughout his career, Gierasch contributed as an author or co-author to an impressive 64 publications.
