= Sushil Atreya =

Indian–American engineer and planetary scientist

Sushil Kumar Atreya
- Education: Michigan (Ph.D.); Yale (M.S.); University of Rajasthan (B.Sc., M.Sc.)
- Awards: Alwyn Seiff Award (2018); David Bates Medal (2016)
- Scientific career
- Fields: Atmospheric Science
- Workplaces: University of Michigan; JPL at Caltech; University of Pittsburgh
- Thesis: An Investigation into the Geocoronal and Interplanetary Hydrogen Balmer Emissions (1973)

Sushil Kumar Atreya is a planetary scientist, educator, and researcher. Atreya is a professor of climate and space sciences and engineering at the University of Michigan.

== Early life and education ==
Sushil Atreya received his Ph.D. in atmospheric science from the University of Michigan in 1973, master's degree in physics from Yale University in 1968, and B.Sc. and M.Sc. degrees in physics, chemistry and mathematics from the University of Rajasthan in 1965. Atreya did his postdoctoral research in the physics department at the University of Pittsburgh.

== Career ==
Sushil Atreya has been a faculty member at the University of Michigan since 1974, first as a research scientist until 1978, and then as an assistant professor from 1978 to 1981, associate professor from 1981 to 1987, and a full professor starting in 1987. Since 2006, Atreya is also a Distinguished Visiting Scientist at the Jet Propulsion Laboratory, California Institute of Technology. Atreya has held visiting professor and visiting astronomer positions at the Université de Paris - Pierre et Marie Curie, and Denis Diderot - and Observatoire de Paris-Meudon in France, and a visiting senior scientist position at Imperial College, London, UK.

Since the mid-1970, Sushil Atreya has been involved in various Solar System exploration missions of NASA, ESA, and JAXA. He is a co-investigator on the DAVINCI (Deep Atmosphere Venus Investigation of Noble gases, Chemistry and Imaging) mission to Venus on which he also leads the origins theme, a co-investigator on the Juno Jupiter Polar Orbiter mission, and a coinvestigator on the Mars Science Laboratory - Curiosity rover mission. Previously, Atreya was a coinvestigator on the Cassini-Huygens mission at the Saturn System, Venus Express, Mars Express, Galileo Jupiter Orbiter and Probe, and the Voyager missions at Jupiter, Saturn, Uranus and Neptune.

Sushil Atreya's research addresses crosscutting themes of the origin and evolution of the atmospheres of the planets and moons of the Solar System, climate evolution, and planetary habitability. Atreya combines numerical modeling, spacecraft and ground-based observations, and data analysis in his study. He has also been developing the concepts for future planetary exploration missions, especially in situ entry probe missions at Jupiter, Saturn, Uranus, Neptune, and Venus. Atreya has published widely in his field of research. Atreya and colleagues made the first highly precise measurements of the primordial argon isotopic ratio on Mars using the mass spectrometer on the Curiosity Rover. It showed that Mars has lost much of its atmosphere in the past 4 billion years, and the so-called rocks from Mars are indeed Martian meteorites. Atreya was amongst the first to discover from orbital observations the presence of methane on Mars — a gas that is largely associated with life on Earth — followed by precise measurements from the surface over a decade with the tunable laser spectrometer on the Curiosity Rover at Gale Crater. With colleagues on the Galileo probe mass spectrometer team, Atreya found that the elements heavier than helium are enriched in Jupiter relative to their solar ratios which was a paradigm shifting constraint on the models of the formation of Jupiter and the other giant planets. On Juno, Atreya is involved in the determination of the global abundance of water using microwave radiometry. Atreya's photochemical models showed how a massive Earth-like atmosphere of nitrogen could evolve on Saturn's largest moon Titan, before the gas was detected on the satellite by Voyager. Using the data from the Cassini-Huygens mass spectrometer, Atreya was amongst the first to reveal the existence of a cycle of methane on Titan that is akin to the hydrologic cycle on Earth. Sushil Atreya is author of the book Atmospheres and the Ionospheres of the Outer Planets and their Satellites (Springer) and editor of Origin and Evolution of Planetary and Satellite Atmospheres (University of Arizona Press).

== Awards ==
Sushil Atreya received the David Bates Medal awarded by the European Geosciences Union in 2016 in recognition of his "exceptional contributions to planetary and solar system sciences". In 2018, Atreya received the Alvin Seiff Award in recognition of his "career achievements in developing and continued promotion of and advocacy for the concept of multiple probe missions to multiple outer planets". The same year, Japan Geosciences Union (JpGU) elected Atreya a Fellow for "outstanding contributions to planetary atmospheric research and planetary missions to understand the origin and evolution of planets in our solar system and in extrasolar systems". Atreya was elected a Fellow of the American Geophysical Union in 2021, and the American Association for the Advancement of Science (AAAS) in 2005. Atreya was elected a Full Member of the International Academy of Aeronautics (IAA) in 1993.
