= Sulfan =

Sulfan, Sulphan, Sulfane or Sulphane may refer to:

- Sulfan (Baker & Adamson), a stabilized form of sulfur trioxide traded by Baker & Adamson
- Nisso sulfan, an alternative name for sulfur trioxide
- Sulfane (organic), a modern systematic name for the older trivial name thioether
- Sulfane/Sulphane, an alternative name for hydrogen sulfide
- Yara Sulfan, an agricultural mineral fertilizer with 24% nitrogen and 6% sulfur

== See also ==
- Endosulfan
- Sulfanyl
- Disulfan (drug) aka Disulfiram, Tetraethylthiuramdisulfid, or Antabuse
- Disulfan (inorganic compound) aka Hydrogen disulfide
