= Deuterium sulfide =

- Space-filling model of deuterium sulfide with atom symbols

Names
- IUPAC name (^{2}H_{2})sulfane
- Other names Hydrogen sulfide-d2 Dideuteriosulfane; Deuterium monosulfide Deuterium sulfide Deuterium sulphide

Identifiers
CAS Number	13536-94-2
3D model (JSmol)	Interactive image
ChemSpider	123015
EC Number	693-260-5
PubChem CID	139492
- InChI: InChI=1S/H2S/h1H2/i/hD2 Key: RWSOTUBLDIXVET-ZSJDYOACSA-N
- SMILES: [2H]S[2H]

Properties
Chemical formula	D_{2}S
Molar mass	36.10 g·mol^{-1}
Melting point	−85 °C (−121 °F; 188 K)
Boiling point	−60 °C (−76 °F; 213 K)
Conjugate acid	Sulfonium
Conjugate base	Hydrosulfide

Hazards
- GHS labelling
Pictograms	(GHS02: Flammable) (GHS04: Compressed Gas) (GHS07: Exclamation mark) (GHS09: Environmental hazard)
Signal word	Danger
Hazard statements	H220, H280, H330, H400
Precautionary statements	P203, P210, P222, P260, P271, P273, P280, P284, P304+P340, P316, P320, P377, P381, P391, P403, P403+P233, P405, P410+P403, P501
NFPA 704 (fire diamond)	4 4 0

Related compounds
Related compounds	Deuterium oxide Deuterium selenide Deuterium telluride
- Except where otherwise noted, data are given for materials in their standard state (at 25 °C [77 °F], 100 kPa). Infobox references

Deuterium sulfide or deuterium sulphide (Commonwealth English) is an inorganic compound with the formula D_{2}S or ^{2}H_{2}S.

== See also ==
- Hydrogen sulfide
- Hydrogen deuterium sulfide
