= Ammonium hydrosulfide =

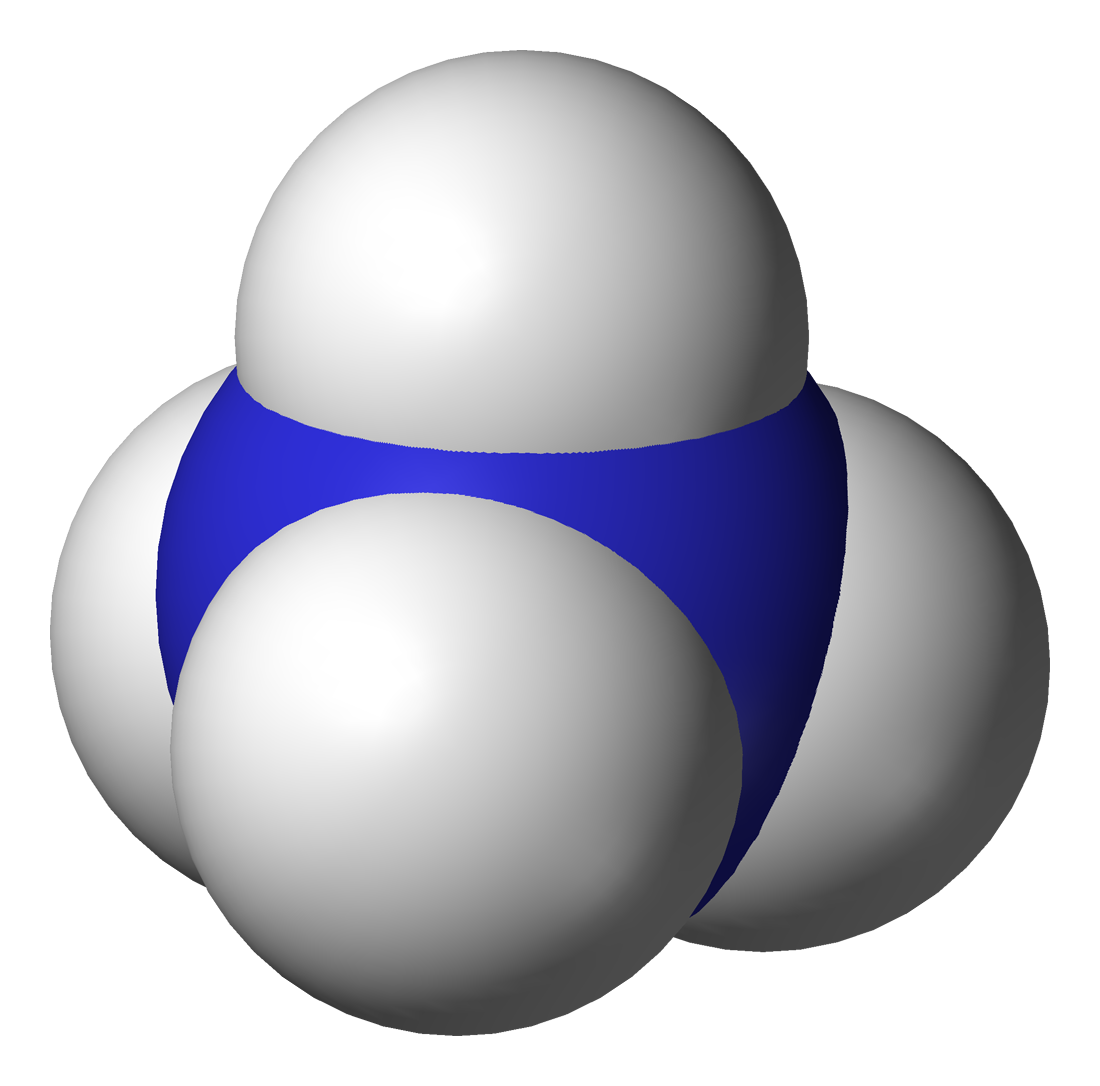
Space-filling model of the ammonium cation
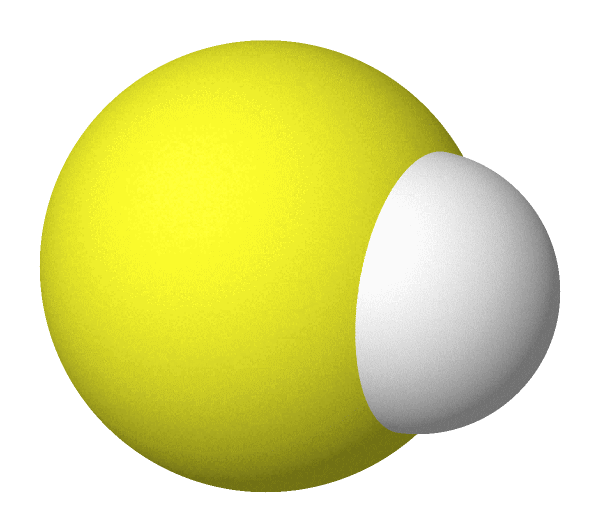
Space-filling model of the hydrosulfide anion

Names
- IUPAC name ammonium hydrosulfide
- Other names ammonium bisulfide ammonium hydrogen sulfide

Identifiers
CAS Number	12124-99-1
3D model (JSmol)	Interactive image
ChemSpider	23805
ECHA InfoCard	100.031.974
EC Number	235-184-3
PubChem CID	25515
RTECS number	BS4900000
UNII	A824D6LXMB
UN number	2683
CompTox Dashboard (EPA)	DTXSID20894064
- InChI: InChI=1S/H3N.H2S/h1H3;1H2 Key: HIVLDXAAFGCOFU-UHFFFAOYSA-N; InChI=1/H3N.H2S/h1H3;1H2 Key: HIVLDXAAFGCOFU-UHFFFAOYAU
- SMILES: [SH-].[NH4+]

Properties
Chemical formula	[NH_{4}]SH
Molar mass	51.111 g/mol
Appearance	Yellow-orange fuming liquid (in solution). White rhombic crystals (anhydrous).
Density	1.17 g/cm^{3}
Boiling point	56.6 °C (133.9 °F; 329.8 K)
Solubility in water	Miscible
Solubility	soluble in alcohol, liquid ammonia, liquid hydrogen sulfide; insoluble in benzene, hexane and ether
Refractive index (n_{D})	1.74

Hazards
- Occupational safety and health (OHS/OSH)
Main hazards	Toxic
- GHS labelling
Pictograms	(GHS05: Corrosive) (GHS09: Environmental hazard)
Signal word	Danger
Hazard statements	H314, H400.
Precautionary statements	P260, P264, P273, P280, P301+P330+P331, P303+P361+P353, P304+P340, P305+P351+P338, P310, P321, P363, P391, P405, P501
NFPA 704 (fire diamond)	3 3
- Lethal dose or concentration (LD, LC)
LD_{50} (median dose)	168 mg/kg (rat, oral)

Related compounds
Other anions	Ammonia solution
Other cations	Sodium hydrosulfide
- Except where otherwise noted, data are given for materials in their standard state (at 25 °C [77 °F], 100 kPa). verify (what is ?) Infobox references

Ammonium hydrosulfide is the chemical compound with the formula [NH_{4}]SH.

== Composition ==
It is the salt derived from the ammonium cation and the hydrosulfide anion. The salt exists as colourless, water-soluble, micaceous crystals. On Earth the compound is encountered mainly as a solution, not as the solid, but [NH_{4}]SH ice is believed to be a substantial component of the cloud decks of the gas-giant planets Jupiter and Saturn, with sulfur produced by its photolysis responsible for the color of some of those planets' clouds. It can be generated by mixing hydrogen sulfide and ammonia.

== Preparation ==
Solutions of ammonium hydrosulfide can be prepared by passing hydrogen sulfide gas through concentrated ammonia solution. According to a detailed 1895 report, hydrogen sulfide reacts with concentrated aqueous ammonia solution at room temperature to give [NH_{4}]_{2}S·2[NH_{4}]SH. When this species is cooled to 0 °C and treated with additional hydrogen sulfide, one obtains [NH_{4}]_{2}S·12[NH_{4}]SH. An ice-cold solution of this substance kept at 0 °C and having hydrogen sulfide continually passed through it gives the hydrosulfide.

The common "stink bomb" consists of an aqueous solution of ammonium sulfide. The mixture easily converts to ammonia and hydrogen sulfide gases. This conversion illustrates the ease of the following equilibrium:

[NH_{4}]SH ⇌ NH_{3} + H_{2}S

Ammonia and hydrogen sulfide each possesses a powerful stench.

Solid ammonium hydrosulfide can be produced by reacting an equimolar mixture of ammonia and hydrogen sulfide under −18 °C:

NH_{3} + H_{2}S → NH_{4}SH

== "Ammonium sulfide" ==
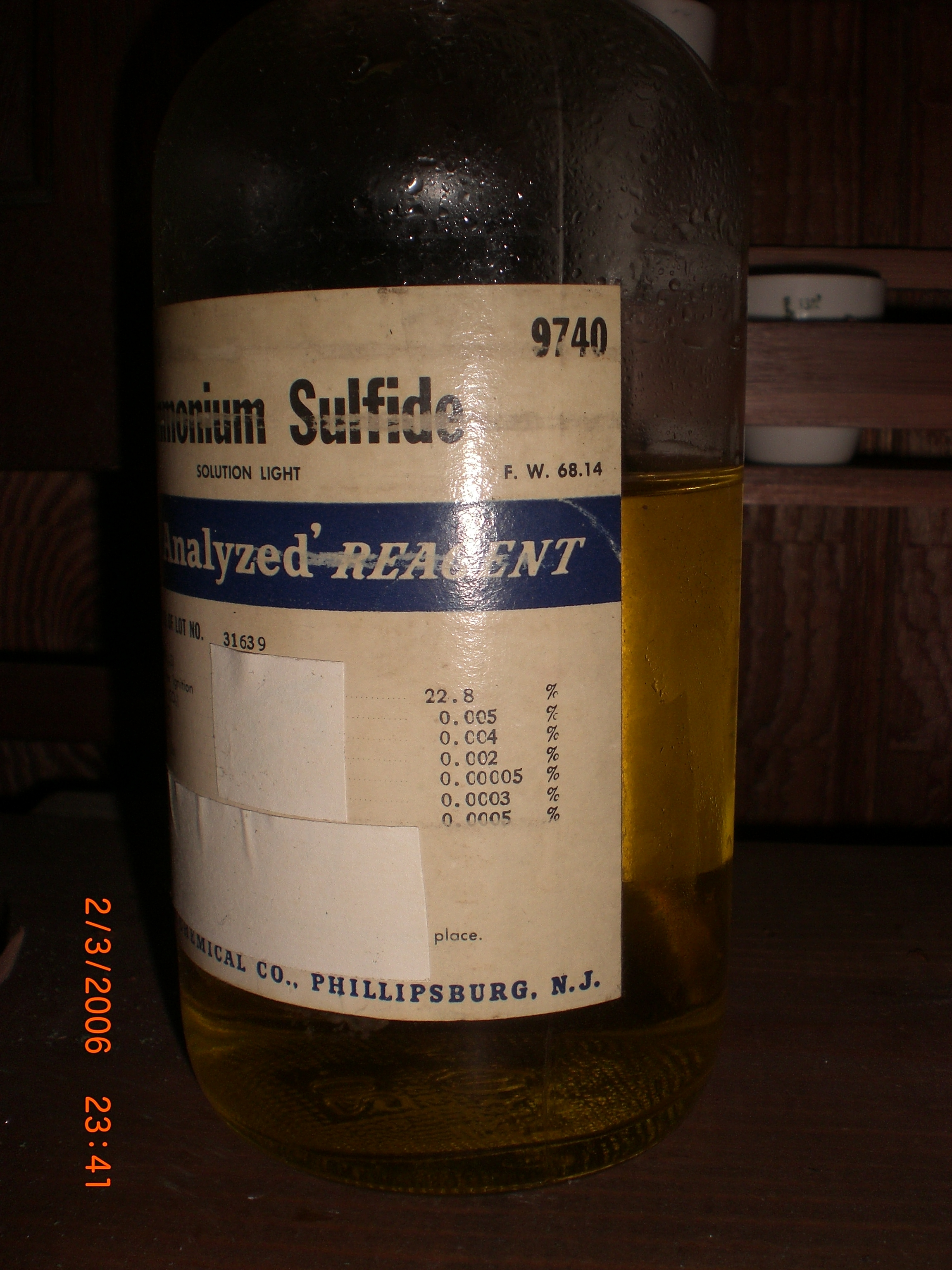
A bottle of ammonium sulfide solution

Aqueous solutions of ammonium sulfide (formally (NH_{4})_{2}S; CAS registry number 12135-76-1 ), also known as diammonium sulfide are commercially available, although the composition of these solutions is uncertain as they could consist of a mixture of ammonia and [NH_{4}]SH. Ammonium sulfide solutions are used occasionally in photographic developing, to apply patina to bronze, and in textile manufacturing. It can be used as a selective reducing agent (cf. 2,4-dinitrochlorobenzene); where there are two nitro groups, only one of them is selectively reduced.

The 1990–91 CRC Handbook of Chemistry and Physics gives information for anhydrous ammonium monosulfide ([NH_{4}]_{2}S) and ammonium pentasulfide ([NH_{4}]_{2}S_{5}) as separate from anhydrous ammonium hydrosulfide ([NH_{4}]SH), describing the former two both as yellow crystalline substances that are soluble in cold water and alcohol, and which both decompose in hot water or at high temperature in general (115 °C for the pentasulfide), but the latter as a white crystalline solid (which also decomposes in hot water). Thus, it seems that solid ammonium sulfide can be distinct from solid ammonium hydrosulfide, even if this is not true in aqueous solution.
