= Transition metal complexes of hydrogen sulfide and hydrosulfide =

Transition metal thiolate complexes of hydrogen sulfide and hydrosulfide is the chemistry of coordination complexes of hydrogen sulfide and hydrosulfide (SH^{−}), its conjugate base. These species are invoked as intermediates or products of the reaction of hydrogen sulfide with metal complexes in solution, e.g., the precipitation of metal sulfides in qualitative inorganic analysis.

== Hydrogen sulfide as a ligand ==
Hydrogen sulfide, like water, is a 2-electron L-type ligand in the covalent bond classification method and the usual electron counting rules. An early and well-studied example is [Ru(NH_{3})_{5}(SH_{2})]^{2+}, an octahedral complex. Such complexes are prepared by displacement of a weaker ligand such as water with hydrogen sulfide.

== Hydrosulfide as a ligand ==
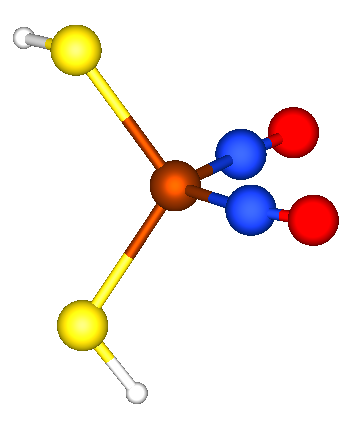
Structure of [Fe(NO)_{2}(SH)_{2}]^{−}. The Fe–S–H angle is 109°. The Fe–N and Fe–S distances are 170 and 228 picometers. Color code: blue = N, red = O, yellow = S.

Hydrosulfide, like chloride, is a 1-electron X-type ligand in the Covalent bond classification method and the usual electron counting rules. Also like chloride, hydrosulfide often functions as a bridging ligand. An example of a hydrosulfide complex is (C_{5}H_{5})Ru(PPh_{3})_{2}(SH), which is derived from (cyclopentadienyl)rutheniumbis(triphenylphosphine) chloride by treatment with sodium hydrosulfide:

(C_{5}H_{5})Ru(PPh_{3})_{2}Cl + NaSH → (C_{5}H_{5})Ru(PPh_{3})_{2}(SH) + NaCl (Ph = C_{6}H_{5})

The ligand properties of hydrosulfide and thiolate are similar, prominently illustrated by the prevalence to bridge, as illustrated by [Fe(μ−SR)(NO)_{2}]_{2} (R = alkyl, H) derived from Roussin's red salt.

== Reactions of M–SH_{x} complexes ==
Some Fe-SH complexes

Acid-base reactions characterize the behavior of hydrogen sulfide and hydrosulfide complexes:

[Ru(NH_{3})_{5}(SH_{2})]^{2+} ⇌ [Ru(NH_{3})_{5}(SH)]^{+} + H^{+}

Because hydrogen sulfide is about 10^{8} times more acidic than water, hydrosulfide complexes are relatively prevalent.

Hydrosulfide ligands are susceptible to oxidative dehydrogenation, giving persulfide-bridged derivatives.

2 [Ru(NH_{3})_{5}(SH_{2})]^{2+} + O_{2} → {[Ru(NH_{3})_{5}]_{2}(S_{2})}^{4+} + 2 H_{2}O
