= Sulfanyl =

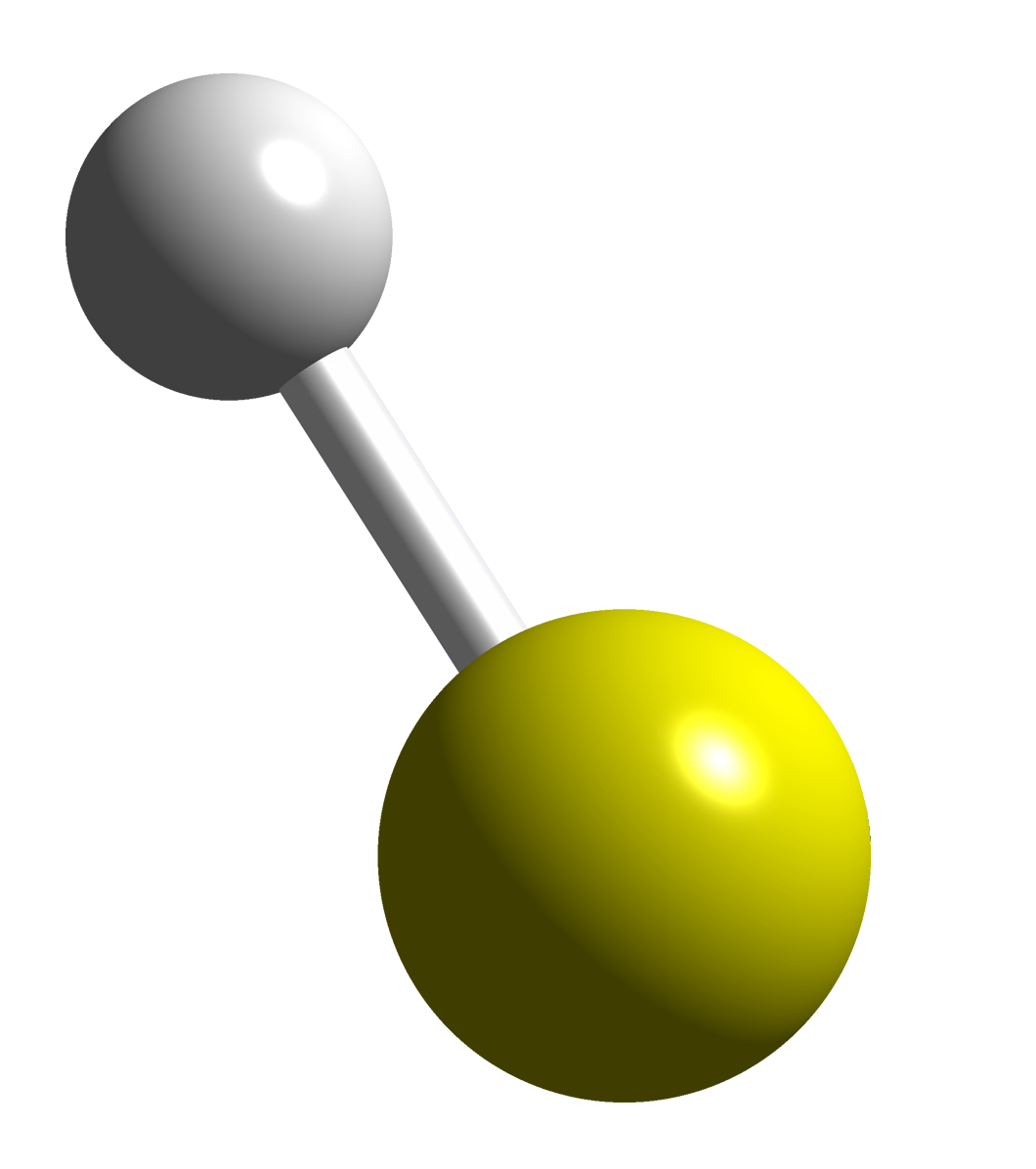
- Ball and stick model of sulfanyl Sulfur, S Hydrogen, H

Names
- Systematic IUPAC name Sulfanyl (substitutive); Hydridosulfur(•) (additive)
- Other names λ^{1}-Sulfane

Identifiers
CAS Number	13940-21-1
3D model (JSmol)	Interactive image
ChEBI	CHEBI:29312
ChemSpider	4574111
Gmelin Reference	299
PubChem CID	5460613
CompTox Dashboard (EPA)	DTXSID201029845
- InChI: InChI=1S/HS/h1H Key: PXQLVRUNWNTZOS-UHFFFAOYSA-N
- SMILES: [SH]

Properties
Chemical formula	HS^{•}
Molar mass	33.073 g mol^{−1}
Appearance	Yellow gas
Solubility in water	Reacts

Thermochemistry
Std molar entropy (S^{⦵}_{298})	195.63 J K^{−1} mol^{−1}
Std enthalpy of formation (Δ_{f}H^{⦵}_{298})	139.33 kJ mol^{−1}

Related compounds
Related radicals	Hydroxyl
Related compounds	Hydrogen sulfide Hydrogen disulfide
- Except where otherwise noted, data are given for materials in their standard state (at 25 °C [77 °F], 100 kPa). verify (what is ?) Infobox references

Sulfanyl (HS^{•}), also known as the mercapto radical, hydrosulfide radical, or hydridosulfur, is a simple radical molecule consisting of one hydrogen and one sulfur atom. The S-H distance in the radical is 0.134 nm. The radical is also proposed to be formed by the action of ultraviolet radiation on hydrogen sulfide. A wavelength of 190 nm gives maximum absorption.

== Gaseous sulfanyl ==
Sulfanyl is one of the top three sulfur-containing gasses in gas giants such as Jupiter and is very likely to be found in brown dwarfs and cool stars. It was originally discovered by Margaret N. Lewis and John U. White at the University of California in 1939. They observed molecular absorption bands around 325 nm belonging to the system designated by ^{2}Σ^{+} ← ^{2}Π_{i}. They generated the radical by means of a radio frequency discharge in hydrogen sulfide. HS^{•} is formed during the degradation of hydrogen sulfide in the atmosphere of the Earth. This may be used as a deliberate action to destroy odours or a natural phenomenon.

Absorption lines of sulfanyl in space were first detected in the infrared by Yamamura (2000) in a star R And. In the sun ^{•}SH was detected at several ultraviolet wavelengths: 326.0459, 327.5468, 328.9749, 330.0892 and 330.1112 nm.

Sulfanyl has been detected in interstellar gas, and it is possibly present in comets.

Various theoretical studies have examined HS^{•} in atmospheres. In Earth's atmosphere HS^{•} reacts with NO_{2} to make two products HSNO_{2} and HSONO. HSONO decomposes to HSO and NO. HS^{•} also reacts with O_{2} and N_{2}O. HS^{•} can also react with Cl_{2} producing HSCl and a Cl^{•} atom. HS^{•} destroys ozone producing HSO^{•} and oxygen. HS^{•} is formed in the Earth's atmosphere by the reaction of HO^{•}, the hydroxyl radical, on carbon disulfide, carbon oxysulfide and hydrogen sulfide with side products of carbon dioxide and water. Photodissociation of hydrogen sulfide also produces the radical in air.

In a planetary atmosphere that contains H_{2}S, HS^{•} will be formed if the temperature and pressure are high enough. The ratio of H_{2}S and HS^{•} is given by:

log(X_{H_{2}S}/X_{HS}) = −3.37 + 8785/T + 0.5 log P_{T} + 0.5 log X_{H_{2}}

For a hydrogen dominated atmosphere in a gas giant or star: H_{2}S has the same level as HS^{•} at

$$\log P_T = 6.82 - 17570/T$$.

At higher temperatures HS^{•} breaks up into sulfur vapour and H_{2}. The line of equal S and HS concentration follows the line

$$\log P_T = 4.80 - 14522/T$$.

The lines of equal concentration cross at 1509 K and 1.51 Pa, with HS^{•} being left out of the mix at lower temperatures and pressures. ^{•}SH is expected to be the second or third most common sulfur containing gas in gas giants or brown dwarfs.

== Organic thiyl ==
The organic analogue of sulfanyl is thiyl radical with the formula RS^{•}, where R is some organic group (e.g., alkyl or aryl). Thermal decomposition of mercaptans, such as ethyl mercaptan has been proposed to involve HS^{•}.

== HS. in biology ==
In humans superoxide dismutase [Cu-Zn] is proposed to convert the hydrosulfide ion (HS^{−}) to HS^{•}. In the proposed mechanism Cu^{2+} is convert to Cu^{+}.

Sulfide dehydrogenase as found in sulfur bacteria catalyses the oxidation of HS^{−}. It has been proposed that this reaction proceeds via HS^{•}, by removing a single electron.

When some sulfur minerals are leached with ferric ions, HS^{•} is proposed to proceed as follows:

MS + Fe^{3+} + 2H^{+} → M^{2+} + Fe^{2+} + H_{2}S^{•+}

with the H_{2}S^{•+} radical then passing a proton to water to make the HS^{•} radical. M is a metal such as zinc or copper. This has potential for bioleaching in metallic ore extraction.

The hydrosulfide ion HS^{−} can be oxidized with cerium (IV) sulfate. The process again has been proposed to involve HS^{•}.

== Reactions ==
In water HS is proposed to react with O_{2} producing SO_{2}^{−} and H^{+}. This SO_{2}^{−} is further proposed to react with O_{2} to give SO_{2} and superoxide O_{2}^{−}.

HS^{•} has an equilibrium with S^{− •} and H^{+}.

The hydroxyl radical ^{•}OH has also been proposed to combine with H_{2}S to form HS^{•} and water. Other reactions investigated are:

HS^{•} + ethylene
HS^{•} + O_{2} → HO^{•} + SO
2 HS^{•} → H_{2}S_{2}
2 HS^{•} → H_{2} and S
H_{2}S_{2} + HS^{•} -> HS–S^{•} + H_{2}S

The hydrogen disulfide is well known.

== Properties ==
The ionization energy of HS is 10.4219 eV. The reduction potential to go to HS^{−} is 0.92 eV. HS^{•} in water can ionize to S^{•−} and H^{+}. The S^{•−} can catalyze a cis-trans conversion in lipids.

HS^{•} reacts with carboxylic acids to make carbonyl sulfide (COS) and probably is the main source of this substance in the atmosphere of Earth.

== Related molecules ==
HS—S^{•} is called disufanyl with lengthening chains as trisulfanyl, tetrasulfanyl and pentasulfanyl HSSSSS^{•}. S^{−}* is termed sulfanidyl. HS^{+} is known as sulfanylium, and the common hydrosulfide ion HS^{−} is also known as sulfanido for a ligand or sulfanide as an anion. Further down the periodic table, HSe^{•} is known as selanyl, and HTe^{•} is termed tellanyl.
