= Bisulfide =

Inorganic anion containing one sulfur and one hydrogen atoms

Wireframe structural formula of bisulfide with the explicit hydrogen added
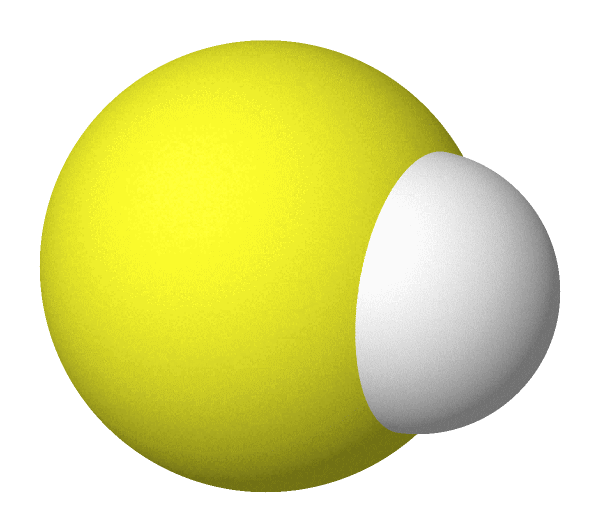

Names
- IUPAC name Hydrosulfide
- Systematic IUPAC name Sulfanide (rarely used, not common)
- Other names: hydrosulfide; hydrogenosulfide

Identifiers
CAS Number	15035-72-0
3D model (JSmol)	Interactive image
ChEBI	CHEBI:29919
ChEMBL	ChEMBL38703
ChemSpider	4224877
Gmelin Reference	24766
PubChem CID	5047209
CompTox Dashboard (EPA)	DTXSID30893785
- InChI: InChI=1S/H2S/h1H2/p-1 Key: RWSOTUBLDIXVET-UHFFFAOYSA-M
- SMILES: [SH-]

Properties
Chemical formula	HS^{−}
Molar mass	33.07 g·mol^{−1}
Conjugate acid	Hydrogen sulfide
Conjugate base	Sulfide
- Except where otherwise noted, data are given for materials in their standard state (at 25 °C [77 °F], 100 kPa). Infobox references

Bisulfide (or bisulphide in British English) is an inorganic anion with the chemical formula HS^{−} (also written as SH^{−}). It contributes no color to bisulfide salts. It often coexists with hydrogen sulfide, which has a distinctive putrid smell. It is a strong base.

It is an important chemical reagent and an industrial chemical, mainly used in paper pulp industry (Kraft process).

== Properties ==
A variety of salts are known, including sodium hydrosulfide and potassium hydrosulfide. Ammonium hydrosulfide, a component of "stink bombs" has not been isolated as a pure solid. Some compounds described as salts of the sulfide dianion contain primarily hydrosulfide. For example, the hydrated form of sodium sulfide, nominally with the formula Na_{2}S · 9 H_{2}O, is better described as NaSH · NaOH · 8 H_{2}O.

Aqueous bisulfide absorbs light at around 230 nm in the UV–visible spectrum. Using this approach, bisulfide has been detected in the ocean and in sewage.

=== Basicity ===
At physiological pH, hydrogen sulfide is almost fully ionized to bisulfide (HS^{−}). Therefore, in biochemical settings, "hydrogen sulfide" is often used to mean, bisulfide. Hydrosulfide has been identified as the third gasotransmitter along with nitric oxide and carbon monoxide.

It has a pK_{a} of 6.9:

HS^{−} + H_{2}O $\ce{<<=>}$ H_{2}S + OH^{−}	1

=== Reactions ===
Upon treatment with an acid, bisulfide converts to hydrogen sulfide. Oxidation of bisulfide gives polysulfides and eventually sulfate. When anstrongly heated, alkali bisulfide salts decompose to produce sulfide salts and hydrogen sulfide. 2NaHS → H_{2}S + Na_{2}S

When treated with metal salts, bisulfide gives the corresponding sulfide:

2NaHS + M^{2+}→ MS + 2 Na^{+} (M = Ni(II), Pb(II), Cd(II), etc)

This conversion is the basis of some schemes in qualitative inorganic analysis.

Under specific conditions, SH^{−} forms some complexes containing SH ligands. Examples include [Au(SH)_{2}]^{−} and (C_{5}H_{5})_{2}Ti(SH)_{2}, derived from gold(I) chloride and titanocene dichloride, respectively.

== Safety ==
Bisulfide salts release toxic hydrogen sulfide upon acidification.

== See also ==
- Disulfide
- Sulfide
- Sulfanyl
- Thiol, SH bonded to an organic group
