= Jupiter's North Pole =

Northern pole of the planet Jupiter

Coordinates: 90°N 0°W

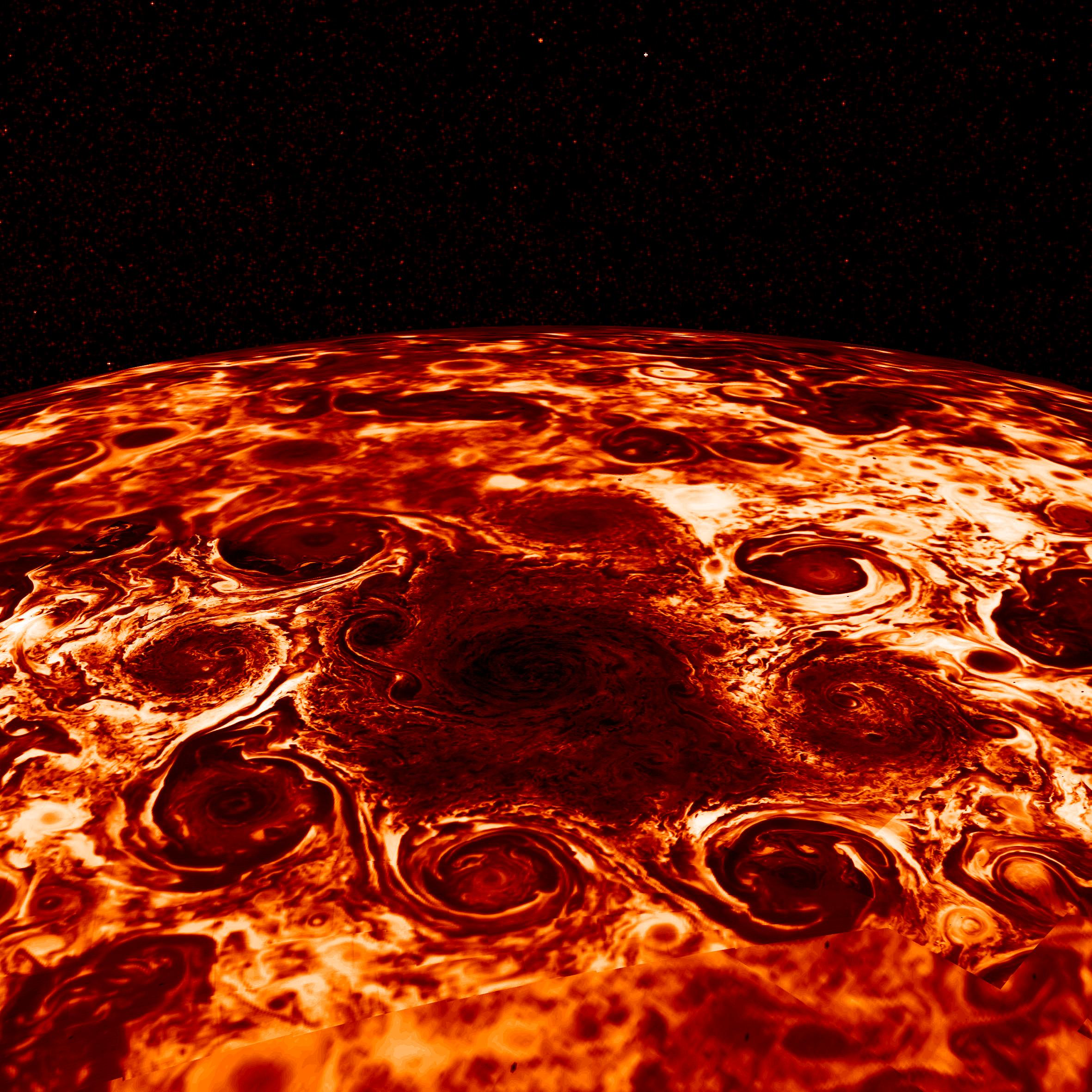
Cyclone storms encircle Jupiter's North Pole, captured in infrared light by NASA's Juno spacecraft

Jupiter's North Pole is the northernmost point of Jupiter. Like Jupiter's South Pole, it has a bluer surface color than the rest of Jupiter. It was first imaged in July 2016 with the Juno probe entering the polar orbit of Jupiter. At the same time, its polar cyclone was discovered, measuring just over 3,000 km, surrounded by eight smaller cyclones which each measure 2,400–2,800 km in diameter. They are almost half the size of the South Pole cyclones and form an almost-regular octagon. All of them turn counterclockwise.

In contrast to the South Pole, where in 2019, to the five peripheral cyclones was added a sixth, at the North Pole, this structure of "1+8", remained stable at least until the end of 2020. Its stability is provided by the tendency of peripheral cyclones to repel each other and move toward the pole, while the central cyclone tends to repel them all.

Three peripheral cyclones (the second, sixth, and eighth) are close to the background in brightness, and the other five are lighter. Several smaller cyclones, up to 1,000 km in diameter, some of which also rotate clockwise, circle around them.

The temperature of the upper atmosphere in this region ranges from −83 °C to −13 °C

When the Juno arrived at Jupiter, its North Pole was in the darkness of polar night, so its first pictures were only infrared. Only when sunlight shifted to the Northern Hemisphere was it possible to see all its cyclones in the light of the Sun. To make one complete picture of the pole, the apparatus requires four approaches to it.

At the North Pole of Jupiter, there is a large X-ray spot, discovered in 2000, pulsating with a period of about 45 minutes; there is a much smaller similar spot at the South Pole. Explanations of this phenomenon have not yet been found.

== Magnetic field ==
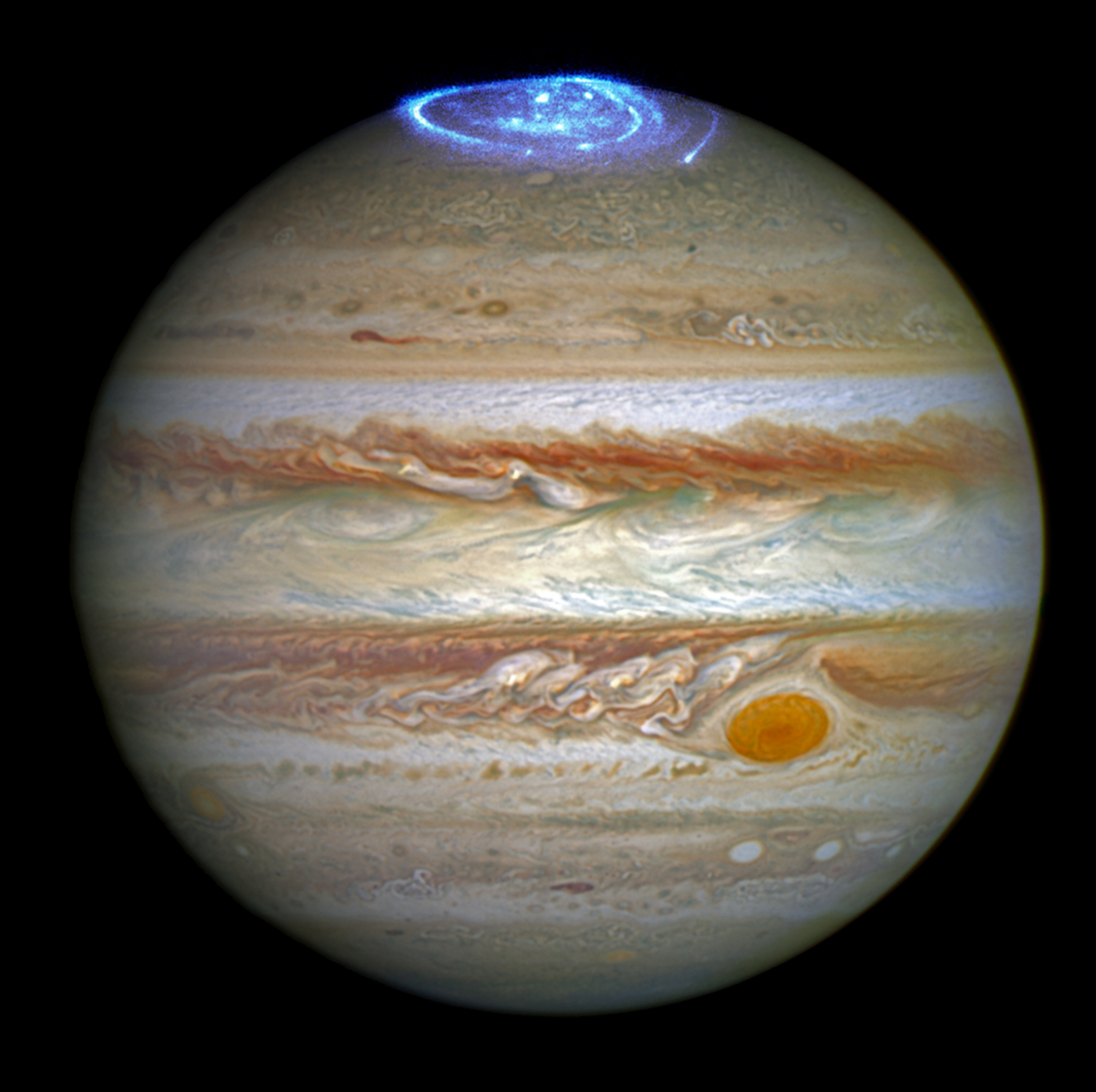
False-color image of aurorae on the north pole of Jupiter, as viewed by the Hubble Space Telescope

Jupiter has a strong magnetic field, which is nearly 20,000 times that of the strength of Earth's magnetic field, which causes an intense and consistent aurora to occur near both of Jupiter's poles.
