= Ammonium pentasulfide =

Names
- IUPAC name Diammonium pentasulfane-1,5-diide
- Other names Diammonium pentasulfide

Identifiers
| CAS Number | 12135-77-2 |
| 3D model (JSmol) | Interactive image |
| ChemSpider | 95740767 |
| EC Number | 235-223-4 |
| PubChem CID | 133108861 |
| CompTox Dashboard (EPA) | DTXCID201333664 |
- InChI: InChI=1S/2H3N.H2S5/c;;1-3-5-4-2/h2*1H3;1-2H Key: PRPVKBZLCJDRNZ-UHFFFAOYSA-N
- SMILES: [NH4+].[NH4+].[S-]SSS[S-]

Properties
| Chemical formula | H_{8}N_{2}S_{5} |
| Molar mass | 196.38 g·mol^{−1} |
| Appearance | Yellow powder |
| Density | 1.6 g/cm^{3} |
| Solubility in water | decomposes in water |
- Except where otherwise noted, data are given for materials in their standard state (at 25 °C [77 °F], 100 kPa). Infobox references

Ammonium pentasulfide is a chemical compound with the chemical formula (NH_{4})_{2}S_{5}.

== Synthesis ==
Passing hydrogen sulfide through a suspension of powdered sulfur in a concentrated ammonia solution:

2NH_{3} + H_{2}S + 4S → (NH_{4})_{2}S_{5}

== Physical properties ==
Ammonium sulfide forms yellow crystals, decomposing in water, of monoclinic system, space group P2_{1}/c, cell parameters a = 0.5427 nm, b = 1.6226 nm, c = 0.9430 nm, β = 105.31°, Z = 4.

The compound can be stored under the mother liquor without air access. When dry, it decomposes quickly in the air. the compound emits sulfur intensively in water and melts in a sealed ampoule at 95 °C to form a red liquid.

== Chemical properties ==
The compound decomposes when stored in air or slightly heated:

(NH_{4})_{2}S_{5} → 2NH_{3} + H_{2}S + 4S
