= Jupiter =

Fifth planet from the Sun

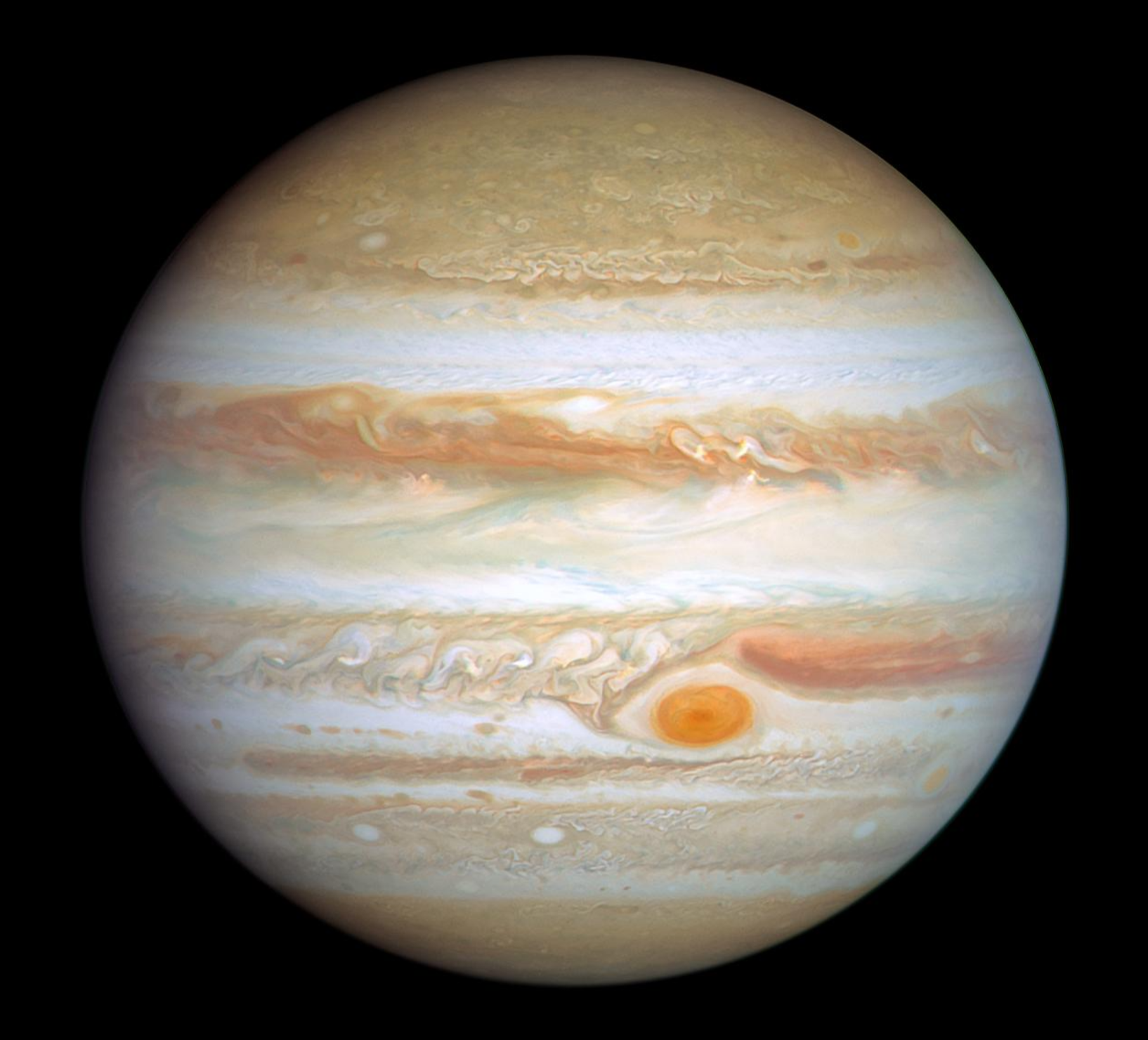
- Jupiter in true colour, (Note: The light filters are 658 nm, 502 nm, and 395 nm, roughly corresponding to red, green and blue respectively) taken by the Hubble Space Telescope in January 2024 (Note: Jupiter's atmosphere and its appearance constantly change, and hence its current appearance today may not resemble what it was when this image was taken. Depicted in this image, however, are a few features that remain consistent, such as the famous Great Red Spot, featured prominently in the lower right of the image, and the planet's recognisable banded appearance.)

Designations
- Pronunciation: /ˈdʒuːpɪtər/
- Named after: Jupiter
- Adjectives: Jovian (/ˈdʒoʊviən/)
- Symbol: ♃

Orbital characteristics
- Epoch J2000
- Aphelion: 5.4570 AU (816.363 million km)
- Perihelion: 4.9506 AU (740.595 million km)
- Semi-major axis: 5.2038 AU (778.479 million km)
- Eccentricity: 0.0489
- Orbital period (sidereal): 11.862 yr; 4,332.59 d; 10,476.8 Jovian solar days
- Orbital period (synodic): 398.88 d
- Average orbital speed: 13.06 km/s
- Mean anomaly: 20.020°
- Inclination: 1.303° to ecliptic; 6.09° to Sun's equator; 0.32° to invariable plane
- Longitude of ascending node: 100.464°
- Time of perihelion: January 21, 2023
- Argument of perihelion: 273.867°
- Known satellites: 115 (as of 2026)

Physical characteristics
- Mean radius: 69886±0.4 km (Note: Refers to the level of 1 bar atmospheric pressure); 10.969 x of Earth
- Equatorial radius: 71488±0.4 km: 11.208 x of Earth's; 0.10275 x of Sun's
- Polar radius: 66842±0.4 km 10.516 x of Earth's
- Flattening: 0.06499
- Surface area: 6.1457×10^{10} km^{2} 120.5 × of Earth's
- Volume: 1.4309×10^{15} km^{3} 1,321 × of Earth's
- Mass: (1.898125±0.000088)×10^{27} kg: 317.8 × of Earth's; 0.00095 × of Sun's
- Mean density: 1.326 g/cm^{3} (Note: Based on the volume at 1 bar atmospheric pressure)
- Surface gravity: 24.79 m/s^{2} 2.528 g_{0}
- Moment of inertia factor: 0.2756±0.0006
- Escape velocity: 59.5 km/s
- Synodic rotation period: 9.9258 h (9 h 55 m 33 s)
- Sidereal rotation period: 9.9250 hours (9 h 55 m 30 s)
- Equatorial rotation velocity: 12.6 km/s
- Axial tilt: 3.13° (to orbit)
- North pole right ascension: 268.057°; 17^{h} 52^{m} 14^{s}
- North pole declination: 64.495°
- Albedo: 0.503 (Bond); 0.538 (geometric)
- Temperature: 88 K (−185 °C) (blackbody temperature)
Surface temp.	min	mean	max
1 bar		165 K
0.1 bar	78 K	128 K
- Apparent magnitude: −2.94 to −1.66
- Absolute magnitude (H): −9.4
- Angular diameter: 29.8" to 50.1"

Atmosphere
- Surface pressure: 200–600 kPa (30–90 psi) (opaque cloud deck)
- Scale height: 27 km (17 mi)
- Composition by volume: 89%±2.0% hydrogen; 10%±2.0% helium; 0.3%±0.1% methane; 0.026%±0.004% ammonia; 0.0028%±0.001% hydrogen deuteride; 0.0006%±0.0002% ethane; 0.0004%±0.0004% water

Jupiter is the fifth planet from the Sun, and the largest in the Solar System. It is a gas giant with a mass nearly 2.5 times that of all the other planets in the Solar System combined and slightly less than one-thousandth the mass of the Sun. The diameter of Jupiter is 11 times that of Earth and a tenth that of the Sun. It orbits the Sun at a distance of 5.20 AU (778.5 Gm), with an orbital period of 11.86 years. Jupiter is the third-brightest natural object in the Earth's night sky, after the Moon and Venus, and has been observed since prehistoric times. It was named after Jupiter, the chief deity of ancient Roman religion.

Jupiter was the first of the Sun's planets to form, and its inward migration during the primordial phase of the Solar System affected much of the formation history of the other planets. Jupiter's atmosphere consists of 76% hydrogen and 24% helium by mass, with a denser interior. It contains traces of the elements carbon, oxygen, sulfur, neon, and compounds such as ammonia, water vapour, phosphine, hydrogen sulfide, and hydrocarbons. Jupiter's helium abundance is 80% of the Sun's, similar to Saturn's composition.

The outer atmosphere is divided into a series of latitudinal bands, with turbulence and storms along their interacting boundaries; the most obvious result of this is the Great Red Spot, a giant storm that has been recorded since 1831.

Because of Jupiter's rapid rotation rate, one turn in ten hours, the shape of the planet is an oblate spheroid; the radius at the equator is about 7% larger than the radius at its poles. Its internal structure is believed to consist of an outer mantle of fluid metallic hydrogen and a diffuse inner core of denser material. The ongoing contraction of Jupiter's interior generates more heat than the planet receives from the Sun. Jupiter's magnetic field is the strongest and second-largest contiguous structure in the Solar System, generated by eddy currents within the fluid, metallic hydrogen core. The solar wind interacts with the magnetosphere, extending it outward and affecting Jupiter's orbit.

At least 115 moons orbit the planet; the four largest moons—Io, Europa, Ganymede, and Callisto—orbit within the magnetosphere and are visible with common binoculars. Ganymede, the largest of the four, is larger than the planet Mercury. Jupiter is surrounded by a faint system of planetary rings. The rings of Jupiter consist mainly of dust and have three main segments: an inner torus of particles known as the halo, a relatively bright main ring, and an outer gossamer ring. The rings have a reddish colour in visible and near-infrared light. The age of the ring system is unknown, possibly dating back to Jupiter's formation. Since 1973, Jupiter has been visited by nine robotic probes: seven flybys and two dedicated orbiters (with two more en route). Jupiter-like exoplanets have also been found in other planetary systems.

== Name and symbol ==
In both the ancient Greek and Roman civilizations, Jupiter was named after the chief god of the divine pantheon: Zeus to the Greeks and Jupiter to the Romans. The International Astronomical Union formally adopted the name Jupiter for the planet in 1976 and has since named its newly discovered satellites for the god's lovers, favourites, and descendants. The planetary symbol for Jupiter,, descends from a Greek zeta with a horizontal stroke, ⟨Ƶ⟩, as an abbreviation for Zeus.

In Latin, Iovis is the genitive case of Iuppiter, i.e. Jupiter. It is associated with the etymology of Zeus ('sky father'). The English equivalent, Jove, is known to have come into use as a poetic name for the planet around the 14th century.

Jovian is the adjectival form of Jupiter. The older adjectival form jovial, employed by astrologers in the Middle Ages, has come to mean 'happy' or 'merry', moods ascribed to Jupiter's influence in astrology.

The original Greek deity Zeus supplies the root zeno-, which is used to form some Jupiter-related words, such as zenography. (Note: See for example: "IAUC 2844: Jupiter; 1975h". International Astronomical Union. October 1, 1975. That particular word has been in use since at least 1966. See: "Query Results from the Astronomy Database". Smithsonian/NASA.)

== Formation and migration ==
Jupiter is believed to be the oldest planet in the Solar System, having formed just one million years after the Sun and roughly 50 million years before Earth. Current models of Solar System formation suggest that Jupiter formed at or beyond the snow line: a distance from the early Sun where the temperature was sufficiently cold for volatiles such as water to condense into solids. First forming a solid core, the planet then accumulated its gaseous atmosphere. Therefore, the planet must have formed before the solar nebula was fully dispersed. During its formation, Jupiter's mass gradually increased until it had 20 times the mass of the Earth, approximately half of which was made up of silicates, ices, and other heavy-element constituents. When the proto-Jupiter grew larger than 50 Earth masses, it created a gap in the solar nebula. Thereafter, the growing planet reached its final mass in 3–4 million years.

According to the "grand tack hypothesis", Jupiter began to form at a distance of roughly 3.5 AU (520 million km; 330 million mi) from the Sun. As the young planet accreted mass, its interaction with the gas disk orbiting the Sun and the orbital resonances from Saturn caused it to migrate inwards. This upset the orbits of several super-Earths orbiting closer to the Sun, causing them to collide destructively. Saturn would later have begun to migrate inwards at a faster rate than Jupiter until the two planets became captured in a 3:2 mean motion resonance at approximately 1.5 AU (220 million km; 140 million mi) from the Sun. This changed the direction of migration, causing them to migrate away from the Sun and out of the inner system to their current locations. All of this happened over a period of 3–6 million years, with the final migration of Jupiter occurring over several hundred thousand years. Jupiter's migration from the inner Solar System eventually allowed the inner planets—including Earth—to form from the rubble.

There are several unresolved issues with the grand tack hypothesis. The resulting formation timescales of terrestrial planets appear to be inconsistent with the measured elemental composition. Jupiter would likely have settled into an orbit much closer to the Sun if it had migrated through the solar nebula. Some competing models of Solar System formation predict the formation of Jupiter with orbital properties that are close to those of the present-day planet. Other models predict Jupiter forming at distances much further out, such as 18 AU (2.7 billion km; 1.7 billion mi).

According to the Nice model, the infall of proto-Kuiper belt objects over the first 600 million years of Solar System history caused Jupiter and Saturn to migrate from their initial positions into a 1:2 resonance, which caused Saturn to shift into a higher orbit, disrupting the orbits of Uranus and Neptune, depleting the Kuiper belt, and triggering the Late Heavy Bombardment.

According to the Jumping-Jupiter scenario, Jupiter's migration through the early Solar System could have led to the ejection of a fifth gas giant. This hypothesis suggests that during its orbital migration, Jupiter's gravitational influence disrupted the orbits of other gas giants, potentially casting one planet out of the Solar System entirely. The dynamics of such an event would have dramatically altered the formation and configuration of the Solar System, leaving behind only the four gas giants humans observe today.

Based on Jupiter's composition, researchers have made the case for an initial formation outside the molecular nitrogen (N_{2}) snow line, which is estimated at 20–30 AU (3.0–4.5 billion km; 1.9–2.8 billion mi) from the Sun, and possibly even outside the argon snow line, which may be as far as 40 AU (6.0 billion km; 3.7 billion mi). Having formed at one of these extreme distances, Jupiter would then have, over a roughly 700,000-year period, migrated inwards to its current location, during an epoch approximately 2–3 million years after the planet began to form. In this model, Saturn, Uranus, and Neptune would have formed even further out than Jupiter, and Saturn would also have migrated inwards.

== Physical characteristics ==
Jupiter is a gas giant, meaning its chemical composition is primarily hydrogen and helium. These materials are classified as gasses in planetary geology, a term that does not denote the state of matter. It is the largest planet in the Solar System, with a diameter of 142,976 km (88,841 mi) at its equator, giving it a volume 1,321 times that of the Earth. Its average density, 1.326 g/cm^{3}, (Note: About the same as sugar syrup (syrup USP),) is lower than those of the four terrestrial planets.

=== Composition ===
The atmosphere of Jupiter is approximately 76% hydrogen and 24% helium by mass. By volume, the upper atmosphere is about 90% hydrogen and 10% helium. The low proportion of helium is due to the fact that a helium atom is more massive than hydrogen as its naturally occurring diatomic molecule, H2. The atmosphere contains trace amounts of elemental carbon, oxygen, sulfur, and neon, as well as ammonia, water vapour, phosphine, hydrogen sulfide, and hydrocarbons like methane, ethane and benzene. Its outermost layer contains crystals of frozen ammonia. The planet's interior is denser, with a composition of roughly 71% hydrogen, 24% helium, and 5% other elements by mass.

The atmospheric proportions of hydrogen and helium are close to the theoretical composition of the primordial solar nebula. Neon in the upper atmosphere consists of 20 parts per million by mass, which is about a tenth as abundant as in the Sun. Jupiter's helium abundance is about 80% that of the Sun due to the precipitation of these elements as helium-rich droplets. This process happens deep in the planet's interior.

Based on spectroscopy, Saturn is thought to be similar in composition to Jupiter, but the other giant planets Uranus and Neptune have relatively less hydrogen and helium and relatively more of the next most common elements, including oxygen, carbon, nitrogen, and sulfur. These planets are known as ice giants because during their formation, these elements are thought to have been incorporated into them as ice; however, they probably contain very little ice.

=== Size and mass ===
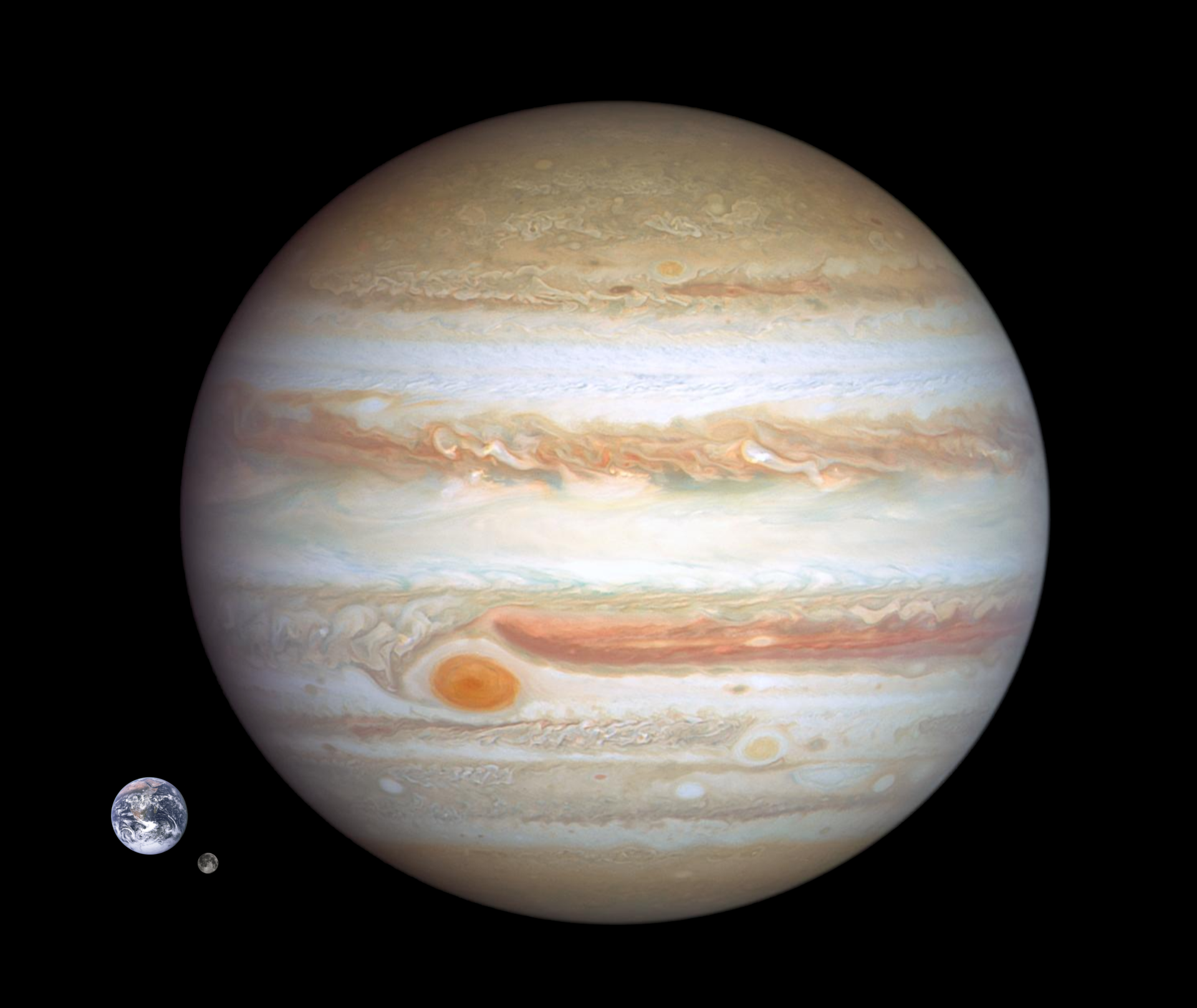
Size of Jupiter compared to Earth and Earth's Moon

Jupiter is about eleven times wider than the Earth (11.208 R_{🜨}); while its mass is 318 times that of Earth, which is 2.5 times the mass of all the other planets in the Solar System combined. It is so massive that its barycentre with the Sun lies above the Sun's surface at 1.068 solar radii from the Sun's centre. Jupiter's radius is about one tenth the radius of the Sun (0.10275 R_{☉}), and its mass is one thousandth the mass of the Sun, meaning the densities of the two bodies are similar. A "Jupiter mass" (M_{J} or M_{Jup}) is used as a unit to describe masses of other objects, particularly extrasolar planets and brown dwarfs. For example, the extrasolar planet HD 209458 b has a mass of 0.69 M_{J}, while the brown dwarf Gliese 229 b has a mass of 60.4 M_{J}. Likewise, the "Jupiter radius", typically interpreted as the planet's equatorial radius, is used to describe the sizes of these objects.

Jupiter radiates more heat than it receives through solar radiation, due to the Kelvin–Helmholtz mechanism within its contracting interior. This process causes Jupiter to shrink by about 1 mm (0.039 in) per year. At the time of its formation, Jupiter was hotter and about twice its current diameter.

Theoretical models indicate that if Jupiter had over 40% more mass, the interior would be so compressed that its volume would decrease despite the increasing amount of matter. For smaller changes in its mass, the radius would not change appreciably. As a result, Jupiter is thought to have about as large a diameter as a planet of its composition and evolutionary history can achieve. The process of further shrinkage with increasing mass would continue until appreciable stellar ignition was achieved. Although Jupiter would need to be about 75 times more massive to fuse hydrogen and become a star, its diameter is sufficient as the smallest red dwarf may be slightly larger in radius than Saturn.

=== Rotation ===
3-hour timelapse showing rotation of Jupiter and orbital motion of the moons

The axial tilt of Jupiter is 3.13°, which is relatively small, so its seasons are insignificant compared to those of Earth and Mars.

Jupiter's rotation is the fastest of all the Solar System's planets, completing a rotation on its axis in slightly less than ten hours; this creates an equatorial bulge easily seen through an amateur telescope. The equatorial radius is 7% longer than the polar radius. Because Jupiter is not a solid body, its upper atmosphere undergoes differential rotation. The rotation of Jupiter's polar atmosphere is about five minutes longer than that of the equatorial atmosphere.

Three systems are used as frames of reference for tracking planetary rotation, particularly when graphing the motion of atmospheric features. System I applies to latitudes from 7° N to 7° S; its period is the planet's shortest, at 9h 50 m 30.0s. System II applies at latitudes north and south of these; its period is 9h 55 m 40.6s. System III was defined by radio astronomers and corresponds to the rotation of the planet's magnetosphere; its period is Jupiter's official rotation period.

=== Internal structure ===
Diagram of Jupiter with its interior, surface features, rings, and inner moons

The character of the interior of Jupiter can only be modeled based on theories validated in laboratories and then compared to measurements made from the outside of the planet. The current models predict three shells with indistinct boundaries. The outer molecular hydrogen shell contains the visible atmosphere with ammonia cirrus clouds covering water clouds which cover silicate clouds. By around 3000 km the compression of molecular hydrogen leads to a highly conductive layer. The second shell, the mantle, begins when the pressure converts hydrogen to its metallic form, resulting in a sea of electrons and protons capped by helium rain clouds. The third shell contains increased concentrations of elements other than hydrogen or helium. Unlike Earth's core, Jupiter's is considered "diluted", with hydrogen and helium mixed in with other elements.

Before the early 21st century, most scientists proposed one of two scenarios for the formation of Jupiter. If the planet accreted first as a solid body, it would consist of a dense core, a surrounding layer of fluid metallic hydrogen (with some helium) extending outward to about 80% of the radius of the planet, and an outer atmosphere consisting primarily of molecular hydrogen. Alternatively, if the planet collapsed directly from the gaseous protoplanetary disk, it was expected to completely lack a core, consisting instead of a denser and denser fluid (predominantly molecular and metallic hydrogen) all the way to the centre. Data from the Juno mission showed that Jupiter has a diffuse core that mixes into its mantle, extending for 30–50% of the planet's radius, and comprising heavy elements with a combined mass 7–25 times the Earth's. This mixing process could have arisen during formation, while the planet accreted solids and gases from the surrounding nebula. Alternatively, it could have been caused by an impact from a planet of about ten Earth masses a few million years after Jupiter's formation, which would have disrupted an originally compact Jovian core.

Outside the layer of metallic hydrogen lies a transparent interior atmosphere of hydrogen. At this depth, the pressure and temperature are above molecular hydrogen's critical pressure of 1.3 MPa and critical temperature of 33 K (−240.2 °C; −400.3 °F). In this state, there are no distinct liquid and gas phases—hydrogen is said to be in a supercritical fluid state. The hydrogen and helium gas extending downward from the cloud layer gradually transitions to a liquid in deeper layers, possibly resembling something akin to an ocean of liquid hydrogen and other supercritical fluids. Physically, the gas gradually becomes hotter and denser as depth increases.

Rain-like droplets of helium and neon precipitate downward through the lower atmosphere, depleting the abundance of these elements in the upper atmosphere. Calculations suggest that helium drops separate from metallic hydrogen at a radius of 60,000 km (37,000 mi) (11,000 km [6,800 mi] below the cloud tops) and merge again at 50,000 km (31,000 mi) (22,000 km [14,000 mi] beneath the clouds). Rainfalls of diamonds have been suggested to occur, as well as on Saturn and the ice giants Uranus and Neptune.

=== Atmosphere ===
The atmosphere of Jupiter is primarily composed of molecular hydrogen and helium, with a smaller amount of other compounds such as water, methane, hydrogen sulfide, and ammonia. Jupiter's atmosphere extends to a depth of approximately 3,000 kilometres (2,000 mi) below the cloud layers.

==== Cloud layers ====
Timelapse of Jupiter's cloud system moving over the course of one month (photographed during Voyager 1 flyby in 1979)

Jupiter is perpetually covered with clouds of ammonia crystals, which may contain ammonium hydrosulfide as well. The clouds are located in the tropopause layer of the atmosphere, forming bands at different latitudes, known as tropical regions. These are subdivided into lighter-hued zones and darker belts. The interactions of these conflicting circulation patterns cause storms and turbulence. Wind speeds of 100 metres per second (360 km/h; 220 mph) are common in zonal jet streams. The zones have been observed to vary in width, colour and intensity from year to year, but they have remained stable enough for scientists to name them.

The cloud layer is about 50 km (31 mi) deep and consists of at least two decks of ammonia clouds: a thin, clearer region on top and a thicker, lower deck. There may be a thin layer of water clouds underlying the ammonia clouds, as suggested by flashes of lightning detected in the atmosphere of Jupiter. These electrical discharges can be up to a thousand times as powerful as lightning on Earth. The water clouds are assumed to generate thunderstorms in the same way as terrestrial thunderstorms, driven by the heat rising from the interior. The Juno mission revealed the presence of "shallow lightning" which originates from ammonia-water clouds relatively high in the atmosphere. These discharges carry "mushballs" of water-ammonia slushes covered in ice, which fall deep into the atmosphere. Upper-atmospheric lightning has been observed in Jupiter's upper atmosphere, bright flashes of light that last around 1.4 milliseconds. These are known as "elves" or "sprites" and appear blue or pink due to the hydrogen.

The orange and brown colours in the clouds of Jupiter are caused by upwelling compounds that change colour when they are exposed to ultraviolet light from the Sun. The exact makeup remains uncertain, but the substances are thought to be made up of phosphorus, sulfur, or possibly hydrocarbons. These colourful compounds, known as chromophores, mix with the warmer clouds of the lower deck. The light-coloured zones are formed when rising convection cells form crystallising ammonia that hides the chromophores from view.

Jupiter has a low axial tilt, thus ensuring that the poles always receive less solar radiation than the planet's equatorial region. Convection within the interior of the planet transports energy to the poles, balancing out temperatures at the cloud layer.

==== Great Red Spot and other vortices ====
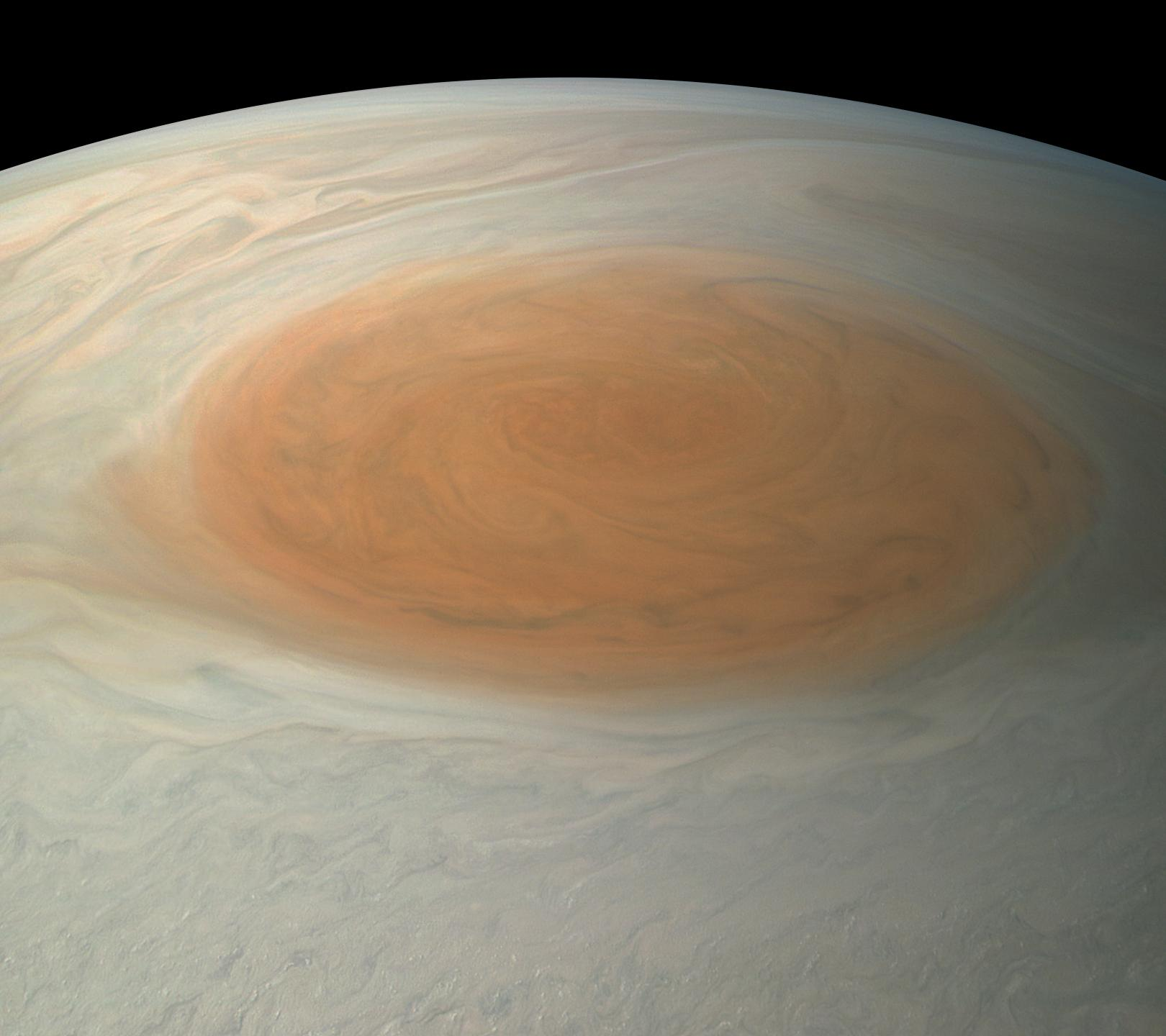
Close-up of the Great Red Spot imaged by the Juno spacecraft in true colour. Due to the way Juno takes photographs, the stitched image has extreme barrel distortion.

A well-known feature of Jupiter is the Great Red Spot, a persistent anticyclonic storm located 22° south of the equator. It was first observed in 1831, and possibly as early as 1665. Images by the Hubble Space Telescope have shown two more "red spots" adjacent to the Great Red Spot. The storm is visible through Earth-based telescopes with an aperture of 12 cm or larger. The storm rotates counterclockwise, with a period of about six days. The maximum altitude of this storm is about 8 kilometres (5 mi) above the surrounding cloud tops. The Spot's composition and the source of its red colour remain uncertain. However, photodissociated ammonia reacting with acetylene is a likely explanation.

The Great Red Spot is larger than the Earth. Mathematical models suggest that the storm is stable and will be a permanent feature of the planet. However, it has significantly decreased in size since its discovery. Initial observations in the late 1800s showed it to be approximately 41,000 km (25,500 mi) across. As of 2015, the storm was measured at approximately 16,500 by 10,940 kilometres (10,250 by 6,800 mi), and was decreasing in length by about 930 km (580 mi) per year. In October 2021, a Juno flyby mission measured the depth of the Great Red Spot, putting it at around 300–500 kilometres (190–310 mi).

Juno missions found several cyclone groups at Jupiter's poles. The northern group contains nine cyclones, with a large one in the centre and eight others around it. At the same time, its southern counterpart also consists of a central vortex but is surrounded by five large storms and a single smaller one, for a total of seven storms.

In 2000, an atmospheric feature formed in the southern hemisphere that is similar in appearance to the Great Red Spot, but smaller. This was created when smaller, white oval-shaped storms merged to form a single feature—these three smaller white ovals were formed in 1939–1940. The merged feature was named Oval BA. It has since increased in intensity and changed from white to red, earning it the nickname "Little Red Spot".

In April 2017, a "Great Cold Spot" was discovered in Jupiter's thermosphere near its north pole via infrared observations of the trihydrogen cation. This feature is approximately 24,000 km (15,000 mi) across, 12,000 km (7,500 mi) wide, and was thought to be 200 °C (360 °F) cooler than surrounding material. The spot changes form and intensity over short time periods while maintaining its general position in the atmosphere for more than 20 years. A series of global maps of Jupiter's thermospheric temperature, dominant molecular ion ($\ce{H3+}$) density, and $\ce{H3+}$ energy radiance have shown this "cold" spot is instead a region of depleted ion density. Both temperature and density influence the filtered images of $\ce{H3+}$ emission, and it is known that density is the dominant controller of its resulting emission. The "Great 'Cold' Spot" is one of many structures in Jupiter's thermosphere which are observable in the infrared and seemingly created from vertical plasma motion driven by neutral wind-magnetic field interactions.

=== Magnetosphere ===
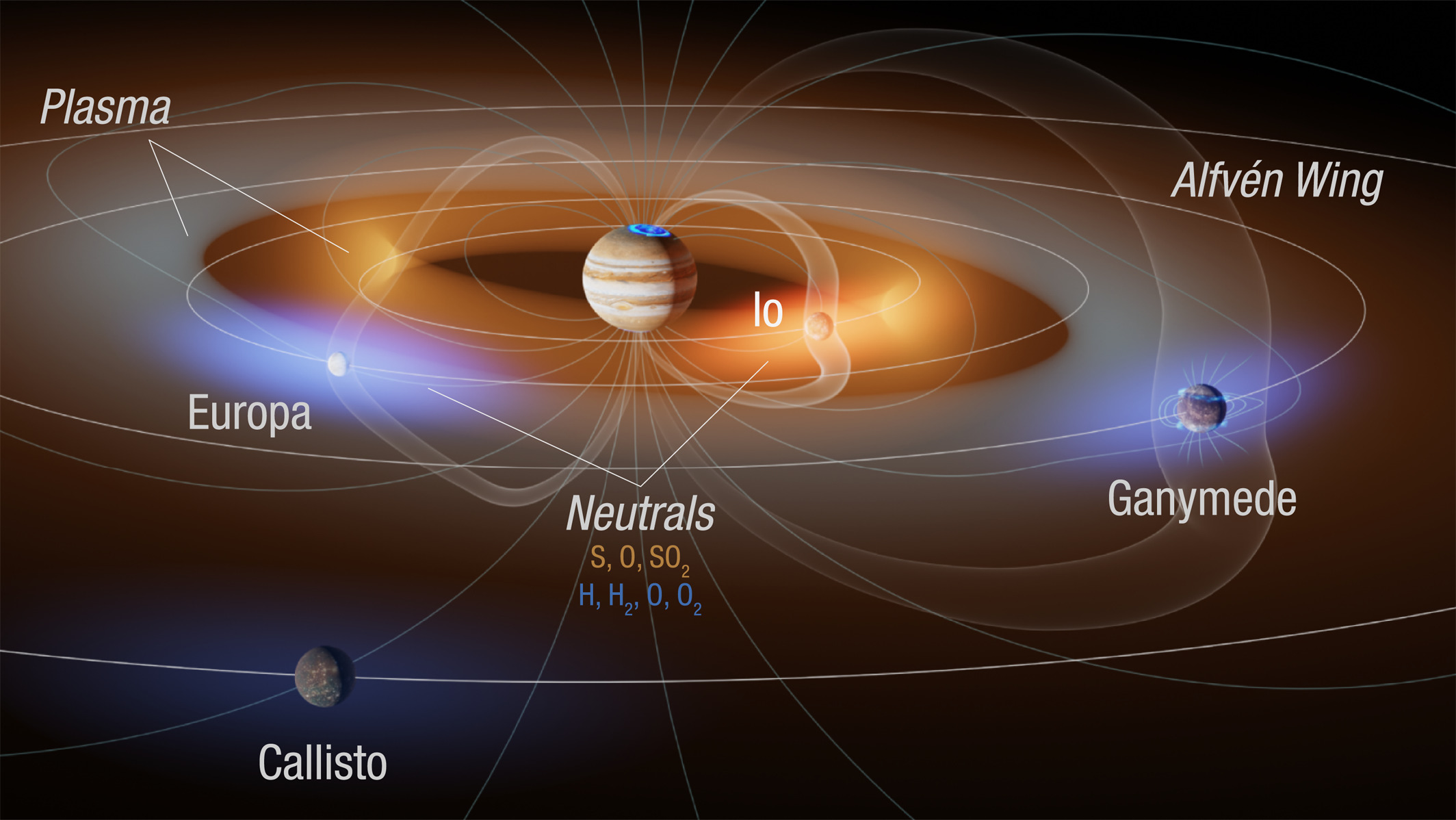
The Galilean moons' effect on Jupiter's magnetosphere

Jupiter's magnetic field is the strongest of any planet in the Solar System, with a dipole moment of 4.170 gauss (0.4170 mT) that is tilted at an angle of 10.31° to the pole of rotation. The surface magnetic field strength varies from 2 gauss (0.20 mT) up to 20 gauss (2.0 mT). This field is thought to be generated by eddy currents—swirling movements of conducting materials—within the fluid, metallic hydrogen core. At about 75 Jupiter radii from the planet, the interaction of the magnetosphere with the solar wind generates a bow shock. Surrounding Jupiter's magnetosphere is a magnetopause, located at the inner edge of a magnetosheath—a region between it and the bow shock. The solar wind interacts with these regions, elongating the magnetosphere on Jupiter's lee side and extending it outward until it nearly reaches the orbit of Saturn. The four largest moons of Jupiter all orbit within the magnetosphere, which protects them from the solar wind.

The volcanoes on the moon Io emit large amounts of sulfur dioxide, forming a gas torus along its orbit. The gas is ionized in Jupiter's magnetosphere, producing sulfur and oxygen ions. They, together with hydrogen ions originating from the atmosphere of Jupiter, form a plasma sheet in Jupiter's equatorial plane. The plasma in the sheet co-rotates with the planet, causing deformation of the dipole magnetic field into that of a magnetodisk. Electrons within the plasma sheet generate a strong radio signature, with short, superimposed bursts in the range of 0.6–30 MHz that are detectable from Earth with consumer-grade shortwave radio receivers. As Io moves through this torus, the interaction generates Alfvén waves that carry ionized matter into the polar regions of Jupiter. As a result, radio waves are generated through a cyclotron maser mechanism, and the energy is transmitted out along a cone-shaped surface. When Earth intersects this cone, the radio emissions from Jupiter can exceed the radio output of the Sun.

== Orbital motion and observation ==
Jupiter is the only planet whose barycentre with the Sun lies outside the volume of the Sun, though by 7% of the Sun's radius. The average distance between Jupiter and the Sun is 778 million km (5.20 AU) and it completes an orbit every 11.86 years. This is approximately two-fifths the orbital period of Saturn, forming a near orbital resonance. The orbital plane of Jupiter is inclined 1.30° compared to Earth. Because the eccentricity of its orbit is 0.049, Jupiter is slightly over 75 million km nearer the Sun at perihelion than at aphelion, which means that its orbit is nearly circular. This low eccentricity is at odds with exoplanet discoveries, which have revealed Jupiter-sized planets with very high eccentricities. Models suggest this may be due to there being two giant planets in the Solar System, as the presence of a third or more giant planets tends to induce larger eccentricities.

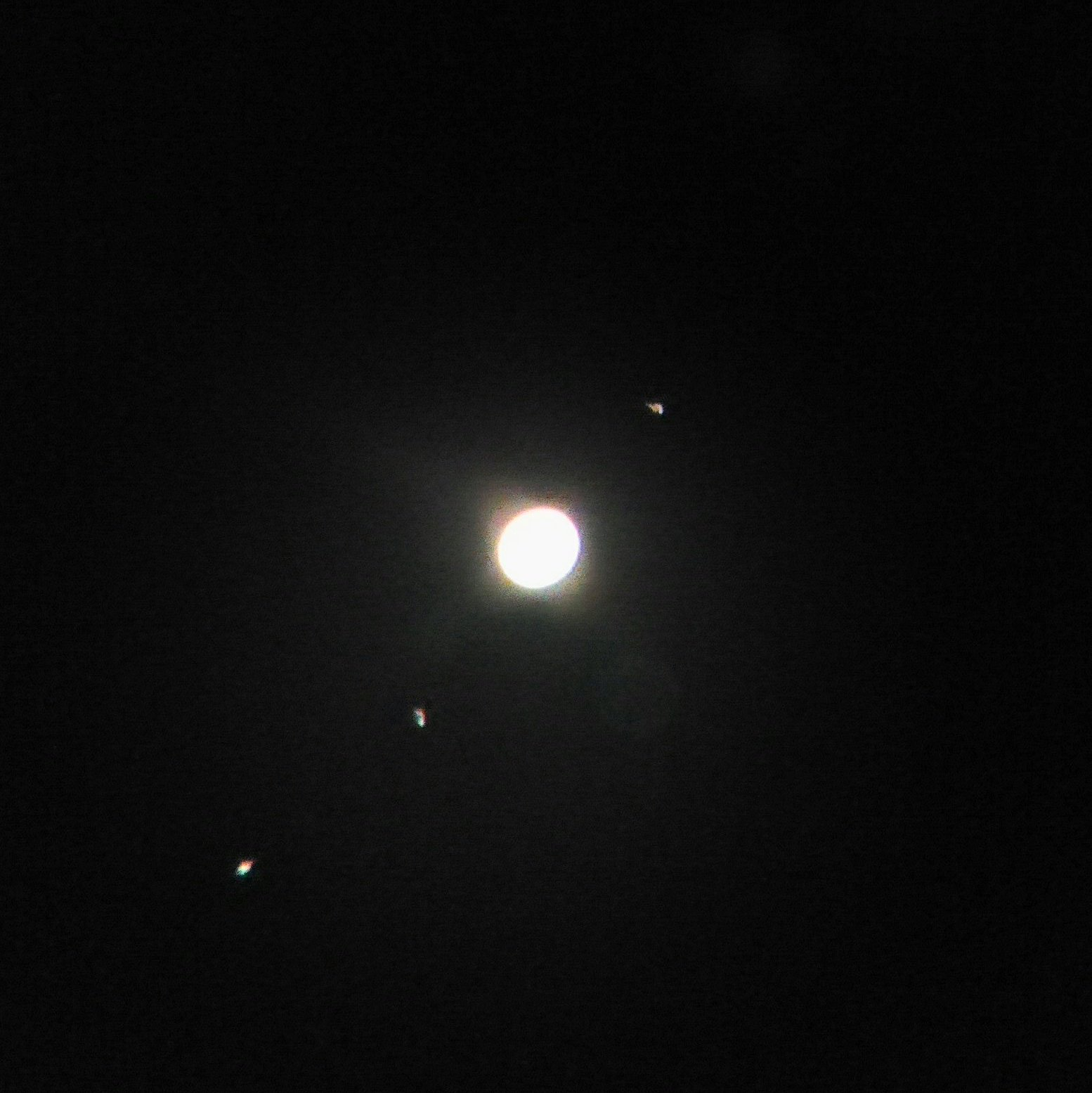
Jupiter and four Galilean moons seen through an amateur telescope

Jupiter is usually the fourth-brightest object in the sky (after the Sun, the Moon, and Venus), although at opposition Mars can appear brighter than Jupiter. Depending on Jupiter's position with respect to the Earth, it can vary in visual magnitude from as bright as −2.94 at opposition down to −1.66 during conjunction with the Sun. The mean apparent magnitude is −2.20 with a standard deviation of 0.33. The angular diameter of Jupiter likewise varies from 50.1 to 30.5 arcseconds. Favourable oppositions occur when Jupiter is passing through the perihelion of its orbit, bringing it closer to Earth. Near opposition, Jupiter will appear to go into retrograde motion for a period of about 121 days, moving backward through an angle of 9.9° before returning to prograde movement.

Because the orbit of Jupiter is outside that of Earth, the phase angle of Jupiter as viewed from Earth is always less than 11.5°; thus, Jupiter always appears nearly fully illuminated when viewed through Earth-based telescopes. It was during spacecraft missions to Jupiter that crescent views of the planet were obtained. A small telescope will usually show Jupiter's four Galilean moons and the cloud belts across Jupiter's atmosphere. A larger telescope with an aperture of 4–6 inches (10–15 cm) will show Jupiter's Great Red Spot when it faces Earth.

== Planetary rings ==
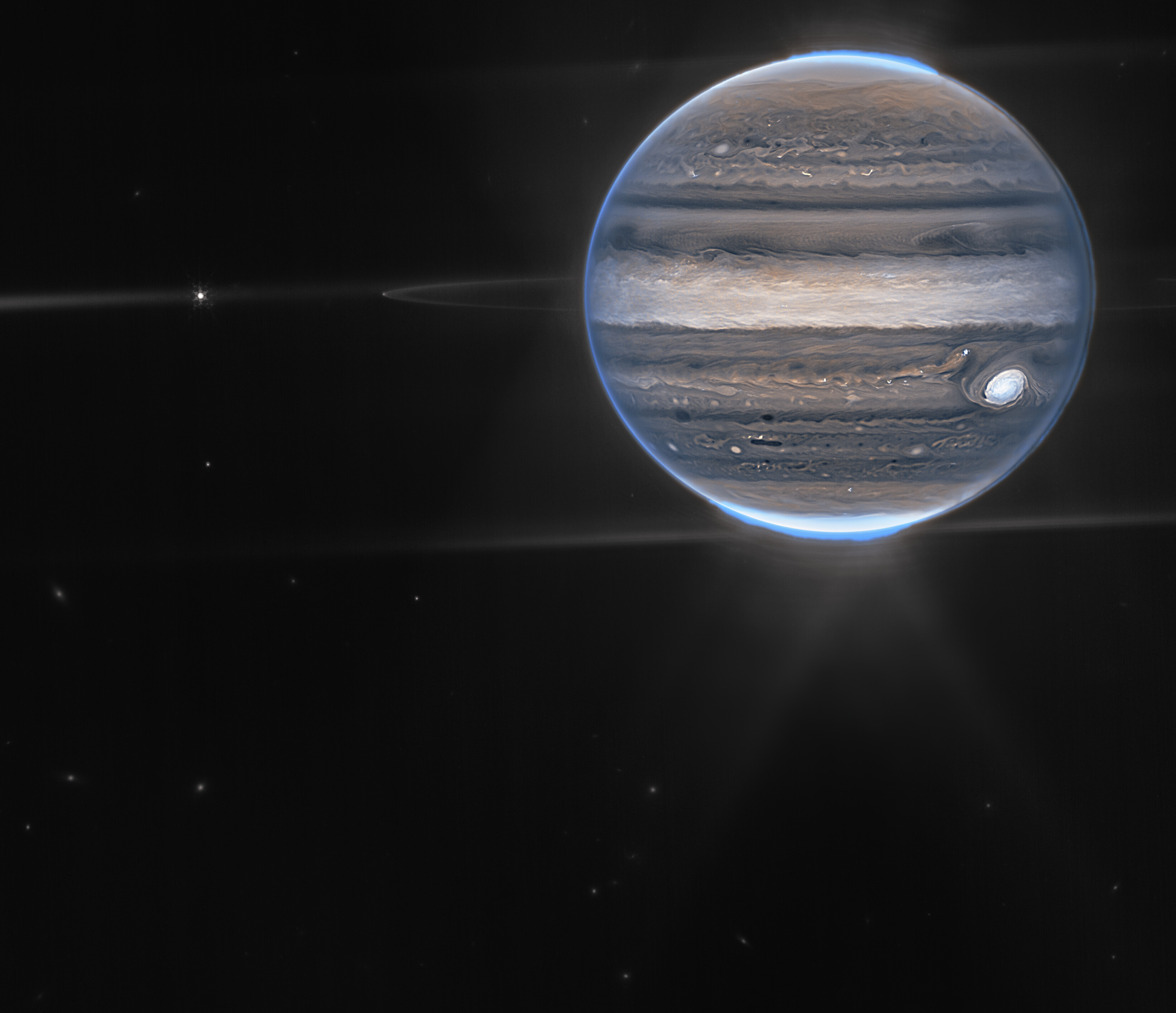
Jupiter, taken in infrared light, showing its faint rings, along with two moons – Amalthea and Adrastea, auroras, and atmospheric features.

Jupiter has a faint planetary ring system composed of three main segments: an inner torus of particles known as the halo, a relatively bright main ring, and an outer gossamer ring. These rings appear to be made of dust, whereas Saturn's rings are made of ice. The main ring is most likely made of material ejected from the satellites Adrastea and Metis, which is drawn into Jupiter because of the planet's strong gravitational influence. New material is added by additional impacts. In a similar way, the moons Thebe and Amalthea are believed to produce the two distinct components of the dusty gossamer ring. There is evidence of a fourth ring that may consist of collisional debris from Amalthea that is strung along the same moon's orbit.

== Moons ==
Jupiter has 115 known natural satellites, and it is likely that this number will go up due to increasing telescopic observations. Of these, only 16 are larger than 10 km in diameter. The four largest moons, known as the Galilean moons, are Ganymede, Callisto, Io, and Europa (in order of decreasing size), and are visible from Earth with binoculars on a clear night.

=== Galilean moons ===
The moons discovered by Galileo—Io, Europa, Ganymede, and Callisto—are among the largest in the Solar System. The orbits of Io, Europa, and Ganymede form a pattern known as a Laplace resonance; for every four orbits that Io makes around Jupiter, Europa makes exactly two orbits, and Ganymede makes exactly one. This resonance causes the gravitational effects of the three large moons to distort their orbits into elliptical shapes, because each moon receives an extra tug from its neighbours at the same point in every orbit it makes. The tidal force from Jupiter, on the other hand, works to circularize their orbits.

The eccentricity of their orbits causes regular flexing of the three moons' shapes, with Jupiter's gravity stretching them out as they approach it and allowing them to spring back to more spherical shapes as they swing away. The friction created by this tidal flexing generates heat in the interior of the moons. This is seen most dramatically in the volcanic activity of Io (which is subject to the strongest tidal forces), and to a lesser degree in the geological youth of Europa's surface, which indicates recent resurfacing of the moon's exterior.

The Galilean moons compared to the Earth's Moon
Name	IPA	Diameter		Mass		Orbital radius		Orbital period	
Name	IPA	km	D_{☾}	kg	M_{☾}	km	a_{☾}	days	T_{☾}
Io	/ˈaɪ.oʊ/	3,643.2	1.05	8.9×10^{22}	1.20	421,700	1.10	1.77	0.07
Europa	/jʊˈroʊpə/	3,121.6	0.90	4.8×10^{22}	0.65	671,034	1.75	3.55	0.13
Ganymede	/ˈɡænɪmiːd/	5,268.2	1.50	14.8×10^{22}	2.00	1,070,412	2.80	7.15	0.26
Callisto	/kəˈlɪstoʊ/	4,820.6	1.40	10.8×10^{22}	1.50	1,882,709	4.90	16.69	0.61

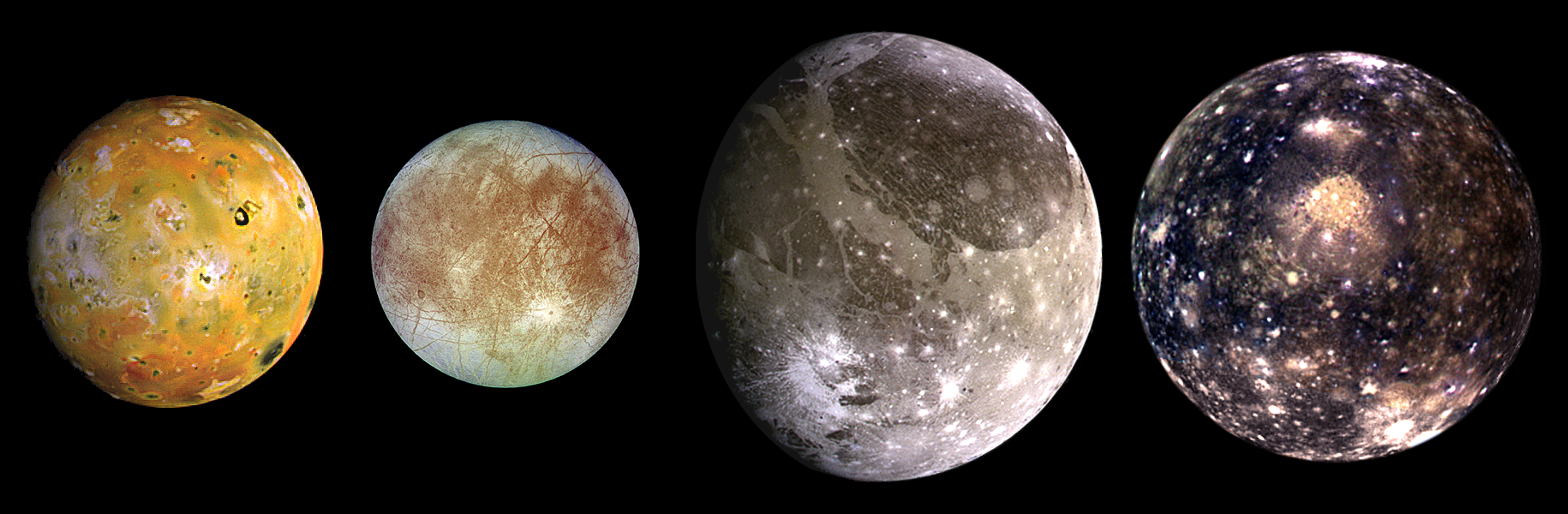
The Galilean satellites in false colour. From left to right, in order of increasing distance from Jupiter: Io, Europa, Ganymede, Callisto.

The Galilean satellites Io, Europa, Ganymede, and Callisto (in order of increasing distance from Jupiter) in false colour

=== Classification ===
Jupiter's moons were classified into four groups of four, based on their similar orbital elements. This picture has been complicated by the discovery of numerous small outer moons since 1999. Jupiter's moons are divided into several different groups, although there are two known moons which are not part of any group (Themisto and Valetudo).

The eight innermost regular moons, which have nearly circular orbits near the plane of Jupiter's equator, are thought to have formed alongside Jupiter. At the same time, the remainder are irregular moons and are thought to be captured asteroids or fragments of captured asteroids. The irregular moons within each group may have a common origin, perhaps as a larger moon or captured body that broke up.

Regular moons
Inner group	The inner group of four small moons all have diameters of less than 200 km, orbit at radii less than 200,000 km, and have orbital inclinations of less than half a degree.
Galilean moons	These four moons, discovered by Galileo Galilei and by Simon Marius in parallel, orbit between 400,000 and 2 million km, and are some of the largest moons in the Solar System.
Irregular moons
Himalia group	A tightly clustered group of prograde-orbiting moons with orbits around 11–12 million km from Jupiter
Carpo group	A sparsely populated group of small moons with highly inclined prograde orbits around 16–17 million km from Jupiter
Ananke group	This group of retrograde-orbiting moons has rather indistinct borders, averaging 21.3 million km from Jupiter with an average inclination of 149 degrees.
Carme group	A tightly clustered group of retrograde-orbiting moons that averages 23.4 million km from Jupiter with an average inclination of 165 degrees
Pasiphae group	A dispersed and vaguely distinct retrograde group that covers all the outermost moons

== Interaction with the Solar System ==
As the most massive of the eight planets, the gravitational influence of Jupiter has helped shape the Solar System. With the exception of Mercury, the orbits of the system's planets lie closer to Jupiter's orbital plane than the Sun's equatorial plane. The Kirkwood gaps in the asteroid belt are mostly caused by Jupiter, and the planet may have been responsible for the Late Heavy Bombardment in the inner Solar System's history.

In addition to its moons, Jupiter's gravitational field controls numerous asteroids that have settled around the Lagrangian points that precede and follow the planet in its orbit around the Sun. These are known as the Trojan asteroids, and are divided into Greek and Trojan "camps" to honour the Iliad. The first of these, 588 Achilles, was discovered by Max Wolf in 1906; since then, more than two thousand have been discovered. The largest is 624 Hektor.

The Jupiter family is defined as comets that have a semi-major axis smaller than Jupiter's; most short-period comets belong to this group. Members of the Jupiter family are thought to form in the Kuiper belt outside the orbit of Neptune. During close encounters with Jupiter, they are perturbed into orbits with a smaller period, which then become circularized by regular gravitational interactions with the Sun and Jupiter.

=== Impacts ===
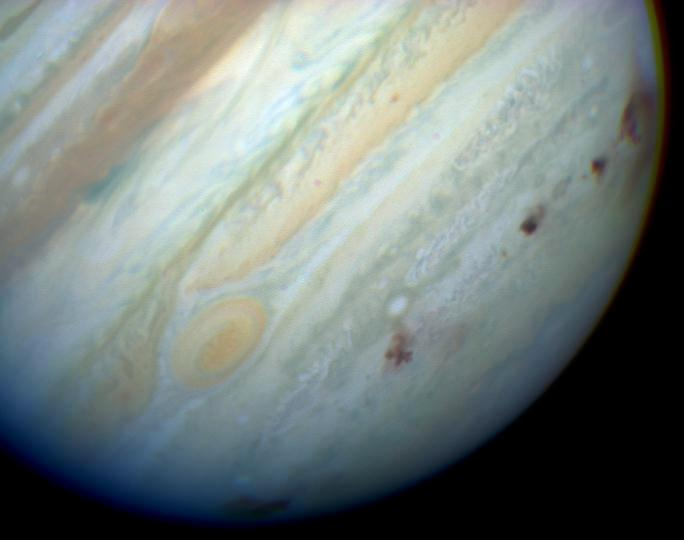
Brown spots mark Comet Shoemaker–Levy 9's impact sites on Jupiter

Jupiter has been called the Solar System's vacuum cleaner because of its immense gravity well and location near the inner Solar System. There are more impacts on Jupiter, such as comets, than on any other planet in the Solar System. For example, Jupiter experiences about 200 times more asteroid and comet impacts than Earth. Scientists used to believe that Jupiter partially shielded the inner system from cometary bombardment. However, computer simulations in 2008 suggest that Jupiter does not cause a net decrease in the number of comets that pass through the inner Solar System, as its gravity perturbs their orbits inward roughly as often as it accretes or ejects them. This topic remains controversial among scientists, as some think it draws comets towards Earth from the Kuiper belt, while others believe that Jupiter protects Earth from the Oort cloud.

In July 1994, the Comet Shoemaker–Levy 9 comet collided with Jupiter. The impacts were closely observed by observatories around the world, including the Hubble Space Telescope and Galileo spacecraft. The event was widely covered by the media.

Surveys of early astronomical records and drawings produced eight examples of potential impact observations between 1664 and 1839. However, a 1997 review determined that these observations had little or no possibility of being the results of impacts. Further investigation by this team revealed that a dark surface feature discovered by astronomer Giovanni Cassini in 1690 may have been an impact scar.

== Observation and exploration history ==
=== Pre-telescopic research ===
Model in the Almagest of the longitudinal motion of Jupiter (☉) relative to Earth (🜨)

Observations of Jupiter are attested by the Babylonian astronomers during the 7th–8th centuries BC. The ancient Chinese knew Jupiter as the 'sui star' (Suìxīng 歲星) and established their cycle of twelve earthly branches based on the approximate number of years it takes Jupiter to revolve around the Sun; the Chinese language still uses its name (歲; simplified as 岁) when referring to years of age. By the 4th century BC, these observations had developed into the Chinese zodiac, and each year became associated with a Tai Sui star and god controlling the region of the heavens opposite Jupiter's position in the night sky. These beliefs survive in some Taoist and folk religious practices and in the East Asian zodiac's twelve animals. The Chinese historian Xi Zezong has claimed that Gan De, an ancient Chinese astronomer, reported a small star "in alliance" with the planet, which may indicate a sighting of one of Jupiter's moons with the unaided eye. If true, this would predate Galileo's discovery by nearly two millennia.

A 2016 paper reports that the trapezoidal rule was used by Babylonians before 50 BC for integrating the velocity of Jupiter along the ecliptic. In his 2nd century work the Almagest, the Hellenistic astronomer Claudius Ptolemaeus constructed a geocentric planetary model based on deferents and epicycles to explain Jupiter's motion relative to Earth, giving its orbital period around Earth as 4332.38 days, or 11.86 years.

=== Ground-based telescope research ===
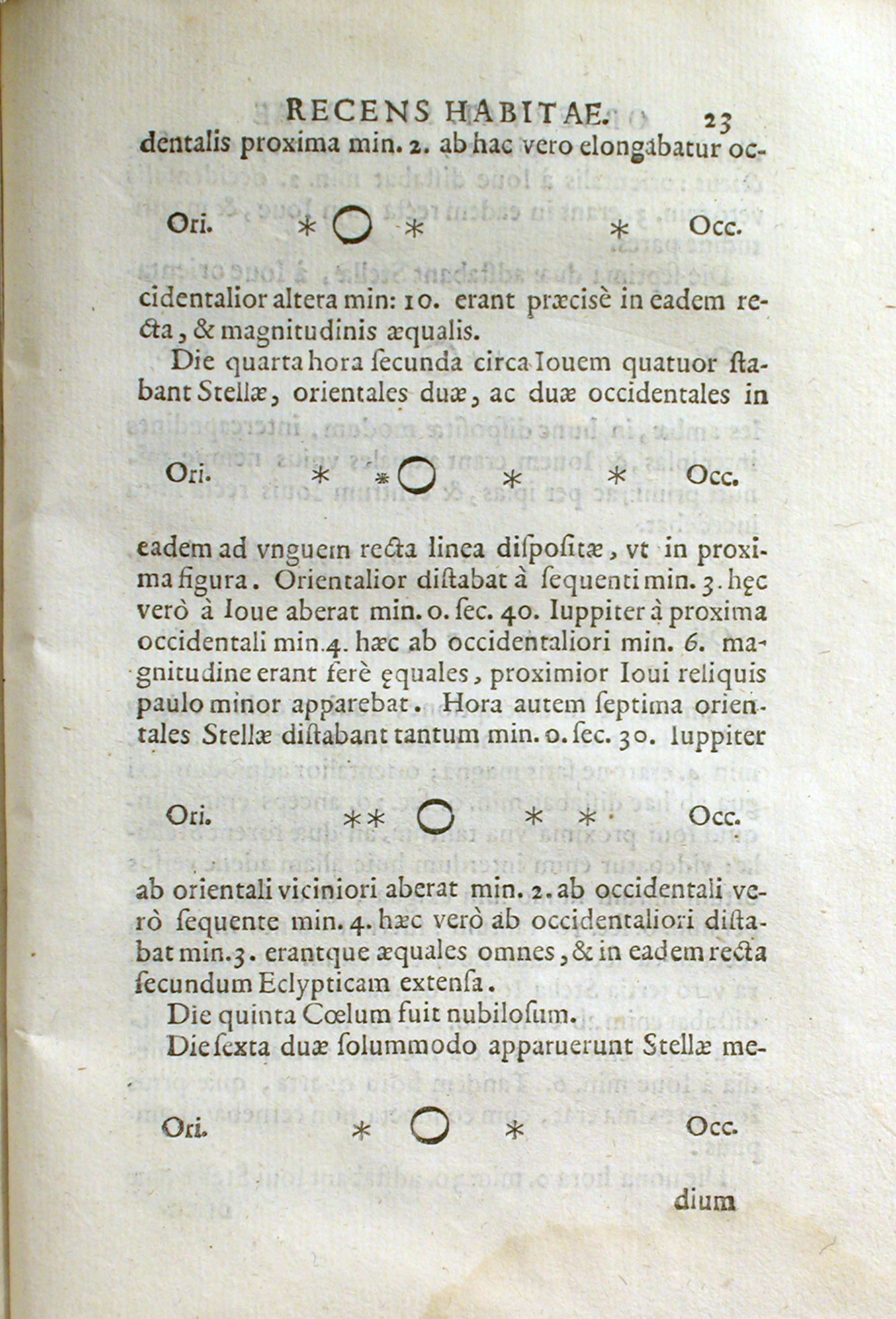
Galileo's drawings of Jupiter and its "Medicean Stars" from Sidereus Nuncius

In 1610, Italian polymath Galileo Galilei discovered the four largest moons of Jupiter (now known as the Galilean moons) using a telescope. This is thought to be the first telescopic observation of moons other than Earth's. Just one day after Galileo, Simon Marius independently discovered moons around Jupiter, though he did not publish his discovery in a book until 1614. It was Marius's names for the major moons, however, that stuck: Io, Europa, Ganymede, and Callisto. The discovery was a major point in favour of the heliocentric theory of the motions of the planets by Nicolaus Copernicus; Galileo's outspoken support of the Copernican theory led to him being tried and condemned by the Inquisition.

In the autumn of 1639, the Neapolitan optician Francesco Fontana tested a 22-palm telescope of his own making and discovered the characteristic bands of the planet's atmosphere.

During the 1660s, Giovanni Cassini used a new telescope to discover spots in Jupiter's atmosphere, observe that the planet appeared oblate, and estimate its rotation period. In 1692, Cassini noticed that the atmosphere undergoes a differential rotation.

The Great Red Spot may have been observed as early as 1664 by Robert Hooke and in 1665 by Cassini, although this is disputed. The pharmacist Heinrich Schwabe produced the earliest known drawing to show details of the Great Red Spot in 1831. The Red Spot was reportedly lost from sight on several occasions between 1665 and 1708 before becoming quite conspicuous in 1878. It was recorded as fading again in 1883 and at the start of the 20th century.

Both Giovanni Borelli and Cassini made careful tables of the motions of Jupiter's moons, which allowed predictions of when the moons would pass before or behind the planet. By the 1670s, Cassini observed that when Jupiter was on the opposite side of the Sun from Earth, these events would occur about 17 minutes later than expected. Ole Rømer deduced that light does not travel instantaneously (a conclusion that Cassini had earlier rejected), and this timing discrepancy was used to estimate the speed of light.

In 1892, E. E. Barnard observed a fifth satellite of Jupiter with the 36-inch (910 mm) refractor at Lick Observatory in California. This moon was later named Amalthea. It was the last planetary moon to be discovered directly by a visual observer through a telescope. An additional eight satellites were discovered before the flyby of the Voyager 1 probe in 1979. (Note: See Moons of Jupiter for details and cites)

In 1932, Rupert Wildt identified absorption bands of ammonia and methane in the spectra of Jupiter. Three long-lived anticyclonic features called "white ovals" were observed in 1938. For several decades, they remained as separate features in the atmosphere that approached each other but never merged. Finally, two of the ovals merged in 1998, then absorbed the third in 2000, becoming Oval BA.

=== Radio telescope research ===
In 1955, Bernard Burke and Kenneth Franklin discovered that Jupiter emits bursts of radio waves at a frequency of 22.2 MHz. The period of these bursts matched the rotation of the planet, and they used this information to determine a more precise value for Jupiter's rotation rate. Radio bursts from Jupiter were found to come in two forms: long bursts (or L-bursts) lasting up to several seconds, and short bursts (or S-bursts) lasting less than a hundredth of a second.

Scientists have discovered three forms of radio signals transmitted from Jupiter:

- Decametric radio bursts (with a wavelength of tens of metres) vary with the rotation of Jupiter, and are influenced by the interaction of Io with Jupiter's magnetic field.
- Decimetric radio emission (with wavelengths measured in centimetres) was first observed by Frank Drake and Hein Hvatum in 1959. The origin of this signal is a torus-shaped belt around Jupiter's equator, which generates cyclotron radiation from electrons that are accelerated in Jupiter's magnetic field.
- Thermal radiation is produced by heat in the atmosphere of Jupiter.

=== Exploration ===
Jupiter has been visited by automated spacecraft since 1973, when the space probe Pioneer 10 passed close enough to Jupiter to send back revelations about its properties and phenomena. Missions to Jupiter are accomplished at a cost in energy, which is described by the net change in velocity of the spacecraft, or delta-v. Entering a Hohmann transfer orbit from Earth to Jupiter from low Earth orbit requires a delta-v of 6.3 km/s, which is comparable to the 9.7 km/s delta-v needed to reach low Earth orbit. Gravity assists through planetary flybys can be used to reduce the energy required to reach Jupiter.

==== Flyby missions ====
Spacecraft	Closest approach	Distance (km)
Pioneer 10	December 3, 1973	130,000
Pioneer 11	December 4, 1974	34,000
Voyager 1	March 5, 1979	349,000
Voyager 2	July 9, 1979	570,000
Ulysses	February 8, 1992	408,894
Ulysses	February 4, 2004	120,000,000
Cassini	December 30, 2000	10,000,000
New Horizons	February 28, 2007	2,304,535

Beginning in 1973, several spacecraft performed planetary flyby manoeuvres that brought them within a higher resolution observation range of Jupiter than had been viewed from Earth. The Pioneer missions obtained the first close-up images of Jupiter's atmosphere and several of its moons. They discovered that the radiation fields near the planet were much stronger than expected, but both spacecraft managed to survive in that environment. The trajectories of these spacecraft were used to refine the mass estimates of the Jovian system. Radio occultations by the planet resulted in better measurements of Jupiter's diameter, the amount of polar flattening, and vertical plasma measurements of its ionosphere.

Six years later, the Voyager missions vastly improved the understanding of the Galilean moons and discovered Jupiter's rings. They also confirmed that the Great Red Spot was anticyclonic. Comparison of images showed that the Spot had changed hues since the Pioneer missions, turning from orange to dark brown. A torus of ionized atoms was discovered along Io's orbital path, which was found to come from erupting volcanoes on the moon's surface. As the spacecraft passed behind the planet, it observed flashes of lightning in the night side atmosphere.

The next mission to encounter Jupiter was the Ulysses solar probe. In February 1992, it performed a flyby manouvre to attain a polar orbit around the Sun. During this pass, the spacecraft studied Jupiter's magnetosphere, although it had no cameras to photograph the planet. The spacecraft passed by Jupiter six years later, this time at a much greater distance.

In 2000, the Cassini probe flew by Jupiter on its way to Saturn and provided higher-resolution images.

The New Horizons probe flew by Jupiter in 2007 for a gravity assist en route to Pluto. The probe's cameras measured plasma output from volcanoes on Io and studied all four Galilean moons in detail.

==== Galileo mission ====
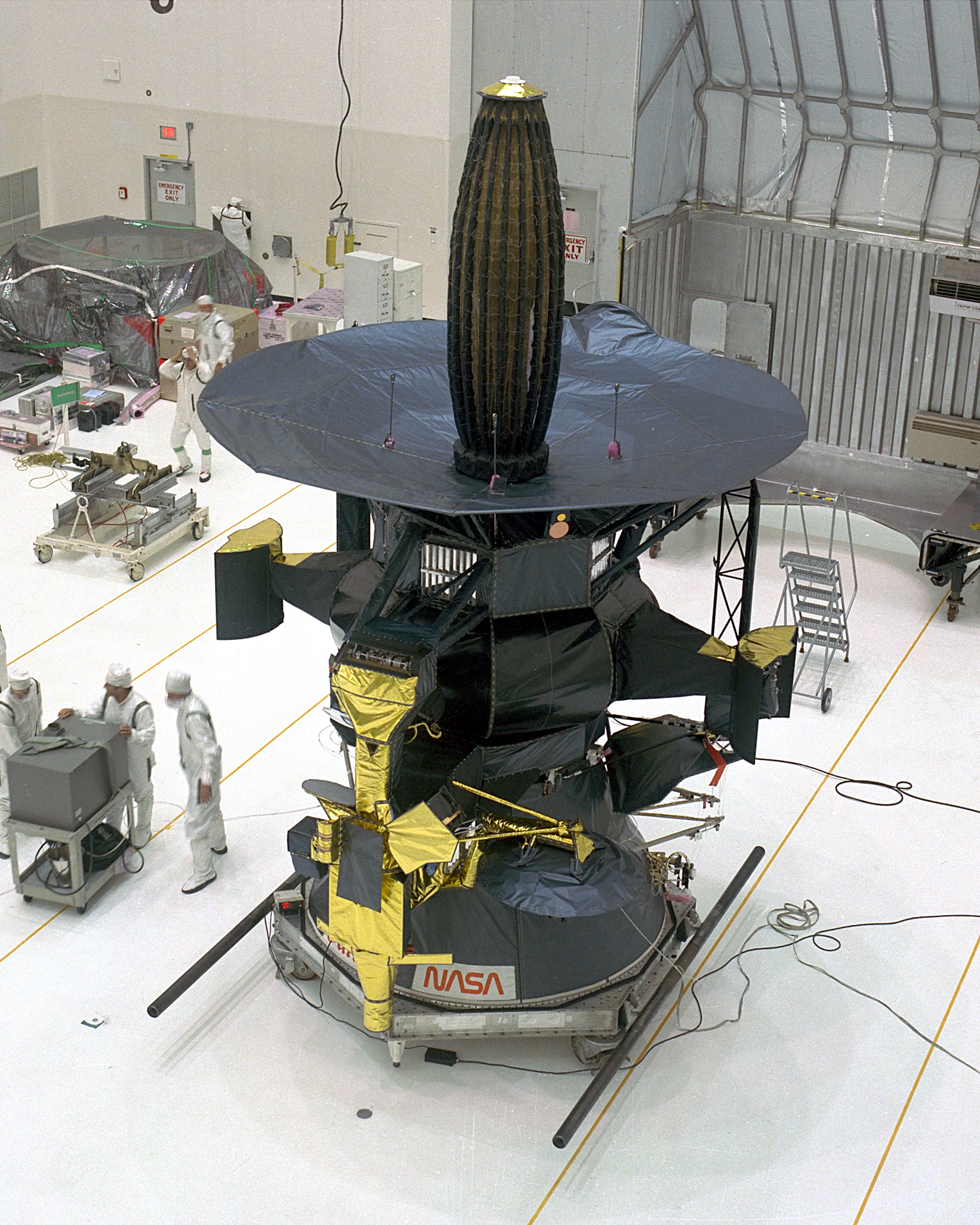
Galileo in preparation for mating with the rocket, 1989

The first spacecraft to orbit Jupiter was the Galileo mission, which reached the planet on December 7, 1995. It remained in orbit for over seven years, conducting multiple flybys of all the Galilean moons and Amalthea. The spacecraft also witnessed the impact of Comet Shoemaker–Levy 9 when it collided with Jupiter in 1994. Some of the goals for the mission were thwarted due to a malfunction in Galileos high-gain antenna.

A 340-kilogram titanium atmospheric probe was released from the spacecraft in July 1995, entering Jupiter's atmosphere on December 7. It parachuted through 150 km (93 mi) of the atmosphere at a speed of about 2,575 km/h (1,600 mph) and collected data for 57.6 minutes until the spacecraft was destroyed. The Galileo orbiter itself experienced a more rapid version of the same fate when it was deliberately steered into the planet on September 21, 2003. NASA destroyed the spacecraft to avoid any possibility of the spacecraft crashing into and possibly contaminating the moon Europa, which may harbour life.

Data from this mission revealed that hydrogen composes up to 90% of Jupiter's atmosphere. The recorded temperature was more than 300 °C (572 °F), and the wind speed measured more than 644 km/h (>400 mph) before the probe vaporized.

==== Juno mission ====
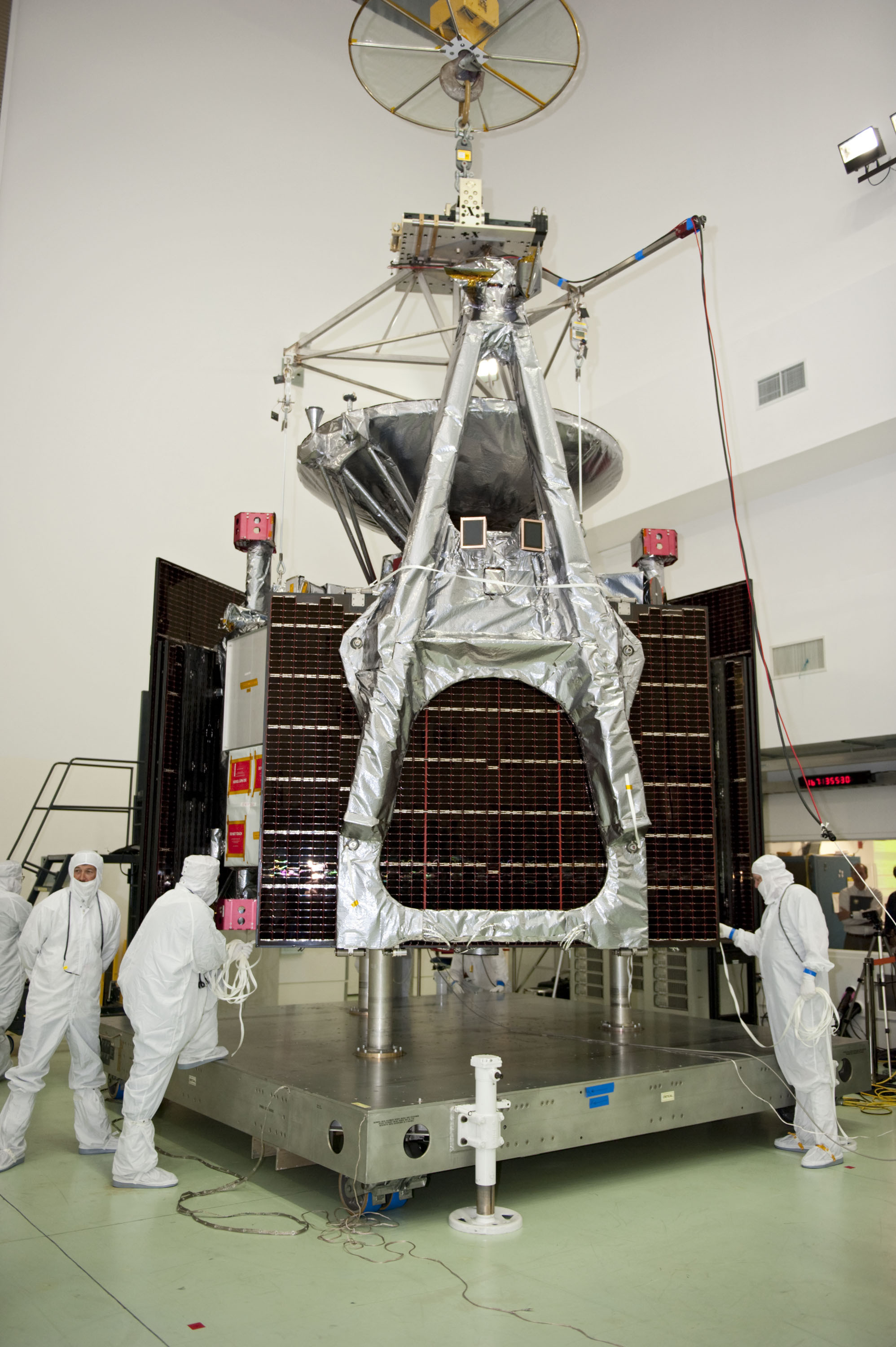
Juno preparing for testing in a rotation stand, 2011

NASA's Juno mission arrived at Jupiter on July 4, 2016, with the goal of studying the planet in detail from a polar orbit. The spacecraft was originally intended to orbit Jupiter thirty-seven times over a period of twenty months. On August 27, 2016, the spacecraft completed its first flyby of Jupiter and sent back the first-ever images of Jupiter's north pole. During the mission, the spacecraft has been exposed to high levels of radiation from Jupiter's magnetosphere, which has begun cause the failure of certain instruments, including its visible light camera, JunoCam, and UV instrument, UVS.

Juno completed 12 orbits before the end of its budgeted mission plan, ending in July 2018. In June of that year, NASA extended the mission operations plan to July 2021, and in January of that year the mission was extended to September 2025 with four lunar flybys: one of Ganymede, one of Europa, and two of Io. When Juno reaches the end of the mission, it will perform a controlled deorbit and disintegrate into Jupiter's atmosphere to avoid the risk of colliding and contaminating Jupiter's moons.

==== Cancelled missions and future plans ====
There is an interest in missions to study Jupiter's larger icy moons, which may have subsurface liquid oceans. Funding difficulties have delayed progress, causing NASA's JIMO (Jupiter Icy Moons Orbiter) to be cancelled in 2005. A subsequent proposal was developed for a joint NASA/ESA mission called EJSM/Laplace, with a provisional launch date around 2020. EJSM/Laplace would have consisted of the NASA-led Jupiter Europa Orbiter and the ESA-led Jupiter Ganymede Orbiter. However, the ESA formally ended the partnership in April 2011, citing budget issues at NASA and the consequences on the mission timetable. Instead, ESA planned to go ahead with a European-only mission to compete in its L1 Cosmic Vision selection. These plans have been realized as the European Space Agency's Jupiter Icy Moon Explorer (JUICE), launched on April 14, 2023, followed by NASA's Europa Clipper mission, launched on October 14, 2024.

Other proposed missions include the Chinese National Space Administration's Tianwen-4 mission, which aims to launch an orbiter to the Jovian system and possibly Callisto around 2035, and CNSA's Interstellar Express and NASA's Interstellar Probe, which would both use Jupiter's gravity to help them reach the edges of the heliosphere.

== In culture ==
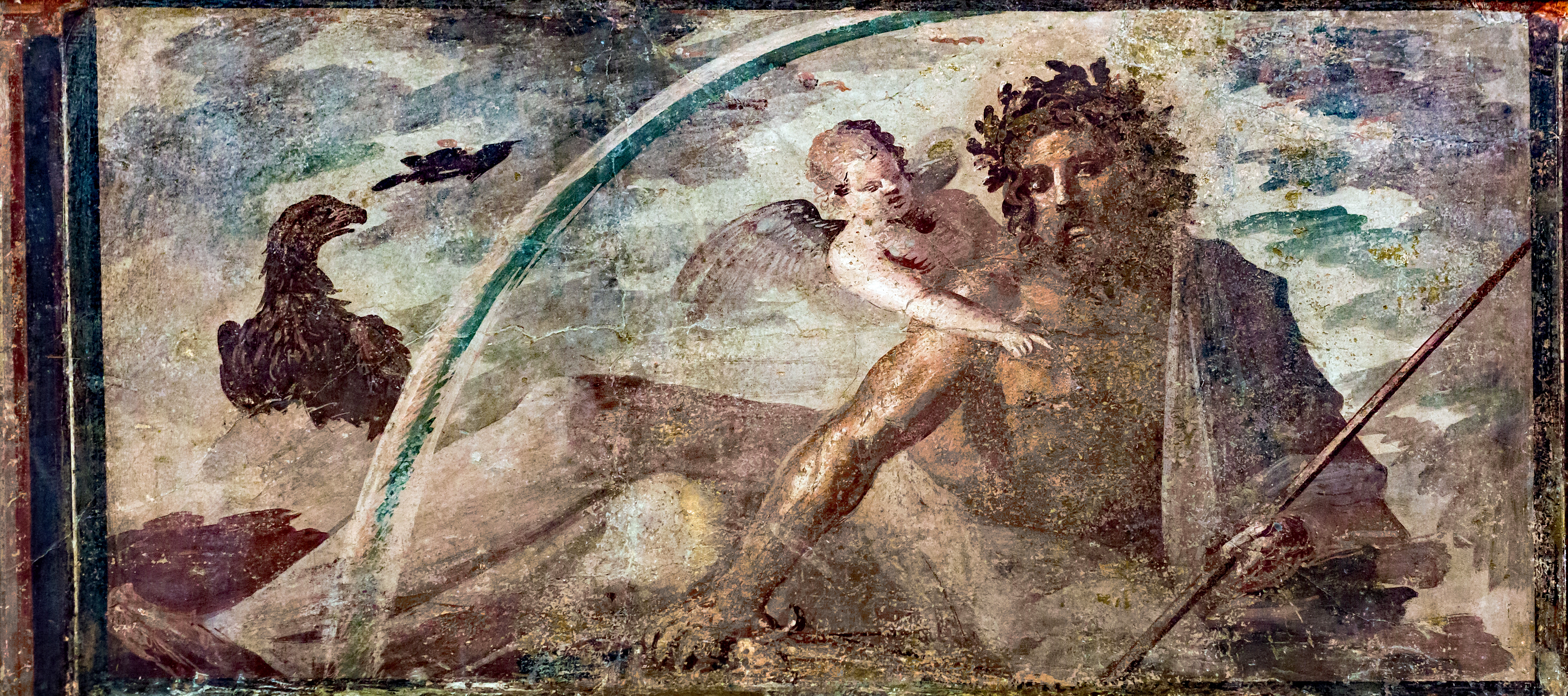
Jupiter-Zeus with thunderbolt and sceptre in the clouds, along with his eagle. Fresco in Herculaneum, 1–37 AD

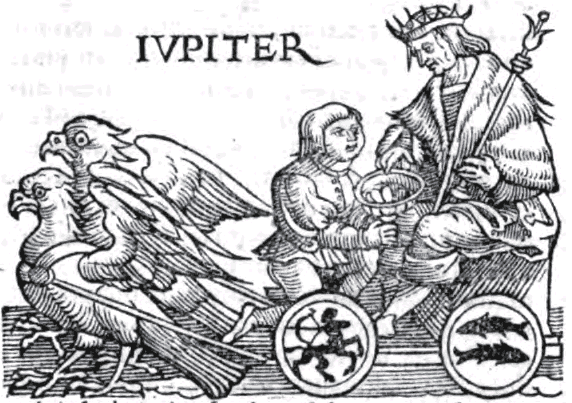
Jupiter, woodcut from a 1550 edition of Guido Bonatti's Liber Astronomiae

The existence of the planet Jupiter has been known since ancient times. It is visible to the naked eye in the night sky and can be seen in the daytime when the Sun is low. To the Babylonians, this planet represented their god Marduk, chief of their pantheon from the Hammurabi period. They used Jupiter's roughly 12-year orbit along the ecliptic to define the constellations of their zodiac.

The mythical Greek name for this planet is Zeus (Ζεύς), also referred to as Dias (Δίας), the planetary name of which is retained in modern Greek. The ancient Greeks knew the planet as Phaethon (Φαέθων), meaning "shining one" or "blazing star". The Greek myths of Zeus from the Homeric period showed particular similarities to certain Near-Eastern gods, including the Semitic El and Baal, the Sumerian Enlil, and the Babylonian god Marduk. The association between the planet and the Greek deity Zeus was drawn from Near Eastern influences and was fully established by the fourth century BC, as documented in the Epinomis of Plato and his contemporaries.

"Jupiter" from Gustav Holst's The Planets, emphasizing the planet's abundance of exuberant life and vitality in astrology.

The god Jupiter is the Roman counterpart of Zeus, and he is the principal god of Roman mythology. The Romans originally called Jupiter the "star of Jupiter" (Iuppiter Stella), as they believed it to be sacred to its namesake god. This name comes from the Proto-Indo-European vocative compound *Dyēu-pəter (nominative: *Dyēus-pətēr, meaning "Father Sky-God", or "Father Day-God"). As the supreme god of the Roman pantheon, Jupiter was the god of thunder, lightning, and storms, and was called the god of light and sky.

In Vedic astrology, Hindu astrologers named the planet after Brihaspati, the religious teacher of the gods, and called it "Guru", which means the "Teacher". In Central Asian Turkic myths, Jupiter is called Erendiz or Erentüz, from eren (of uncertain meaning) and yultuz ("star"). The Turks calculated the period of the orbit of Jupiter as 11 years and 300 days. They believed that some social and natural events connected to Erentüz's movements in the sky. The Chinese, Japanese, Koreans, and Vietnamese called it the "wood star" (Chinese: 木星; pinyin: mùxīng), based on the Chinese Five Elements. In China, it became known as the "year star" (Chinese: 歲星; pinyin: suìxīng), as Chinese astronomers noted that it jumped one zodiac constellation each year (with corrections). In some ancient Chinese writings, the years were, in principle, named in correlation with the Jovian zodiac signs.

== See also ==
- Outline of Jupiter – Fifth planet from the Sun
- Eccentric Jupiter – Jovian planet that orbits its star in an eccentric orbit
- Hot Jupiter – Gas giant planet orbiting close to a star
- Super-Jupiter – Class of planets with more mass than Jupiter
- Jovian–Plutonian gravitational effect – Astronomical hoax
- List of gravitationally rounded objects of the Solar System
