= Sodium hydrosulfide =

- Na^{+}SH^{−}

Names
- IUPAC name Sodium hydrosulfide
- Other names Sodium bisulfide Sodium sulfhydrate Sodium hydrogen sulfide

Identifiers
CAS Number	16721-80-5; 207683-19-0 (hydrate)
3D model (JSmol)	Interactive image
ChEMBL	ChEMBL1644699
ChemSpider	26058
ECHA InfoCard	100.037.056
EC Number	240-778-0
IUPHAR/BPS	6278
PubChem CID	28015
RTECS number	WE1900000
UNII	FWU2KQ177W
UN number	2922 2318
CompTox Dashboard (EPA)	DTXSID3029738
- InChI: InChI=1S/Na.H2S/h;1H2/q+1;/p-1 Key: HYHCSLBZRBJJCH-UHFFFAOYSA-M; InChI=1/Na.H2S/h;1H2/q+1;/p-1 Key: HYHCSLBZRBJJCH-REWHXWOFAV
- SMILES: [Na+].[SH-]

Properties
Chemical formula	NaSH
Molar mass	56.063 g/mol
Appearance	off-white solid, deliquescent
Density	1.79 g/cm^{3}
Melting point	350.1 °C (662.2 °F; 623.2 K) (anhydrous); 55 °C (dihydrate); 22 °C (trihydrate)
Solubility in water	50 g/100 mL (22 °C)
Solubility	Soluble in alcohol, ether

Structure
Crystal structure	rhombohedral

Hazards
- Occupational safety and health (OHS/OSH)
Main hazards	Flammable solid, stench, reacts with acids to release hydrogen sulfide
- GHS labelling
Pictograms	(GHS02: Flammable) (GHS05: Corrosive) (GHS06: Toxic) (GHS09: Environmental hazard)
Signal word	Danger
Hazard statements	H226, H251, H290, H301, H314, H400
Precautionary statements	P210, P233, P234, P235+P410, P240, P241, P242, P243, P260, P264, P270, P273, P280, P301+P310, P301+P330+P331, P303+P361+P353, P304+P340, P305+P351+P338, P310, P321, P330, P363, P370+P378, P390, P391, P403+P235, P404, P405, P407, P413, P420, P501
NFPA 704 (fire diamond)	3 2
Flash point	90 °C (194 °F; 363 K)
Safety data sheet (SDS)	TDC MSDS

Related compounds
Other anions	Sodium hydroxide Sodium amide
Other cations	Ammonium hydrosulfide
Related compounds	Sodium sulfide
- Except where otherwise noted, data are given for materials in their standard state (at 25 °C [77 °F], 100 kPa). verify (what is ?) Infobox references

Sodium hydrosulfide is the chemical compound with the formula NaSH. This compound is the product of the half-neutralization of hydrogen sulfide (H_{2}S) with sodium hydroxide (NaOH). NaSH and sodium sulfide are used industrially, often for similar purposes. Solid NaSH is colorless. The solid has an odor of H_{2}S owing to hydrolysis by atmospheric moisture. In contrast with sodium sulfide (Na_{2}S), which is insoluble in organic solvents, NaSH, being a 1:1 electrolyte, is more soluble.

== Structure and properties ==
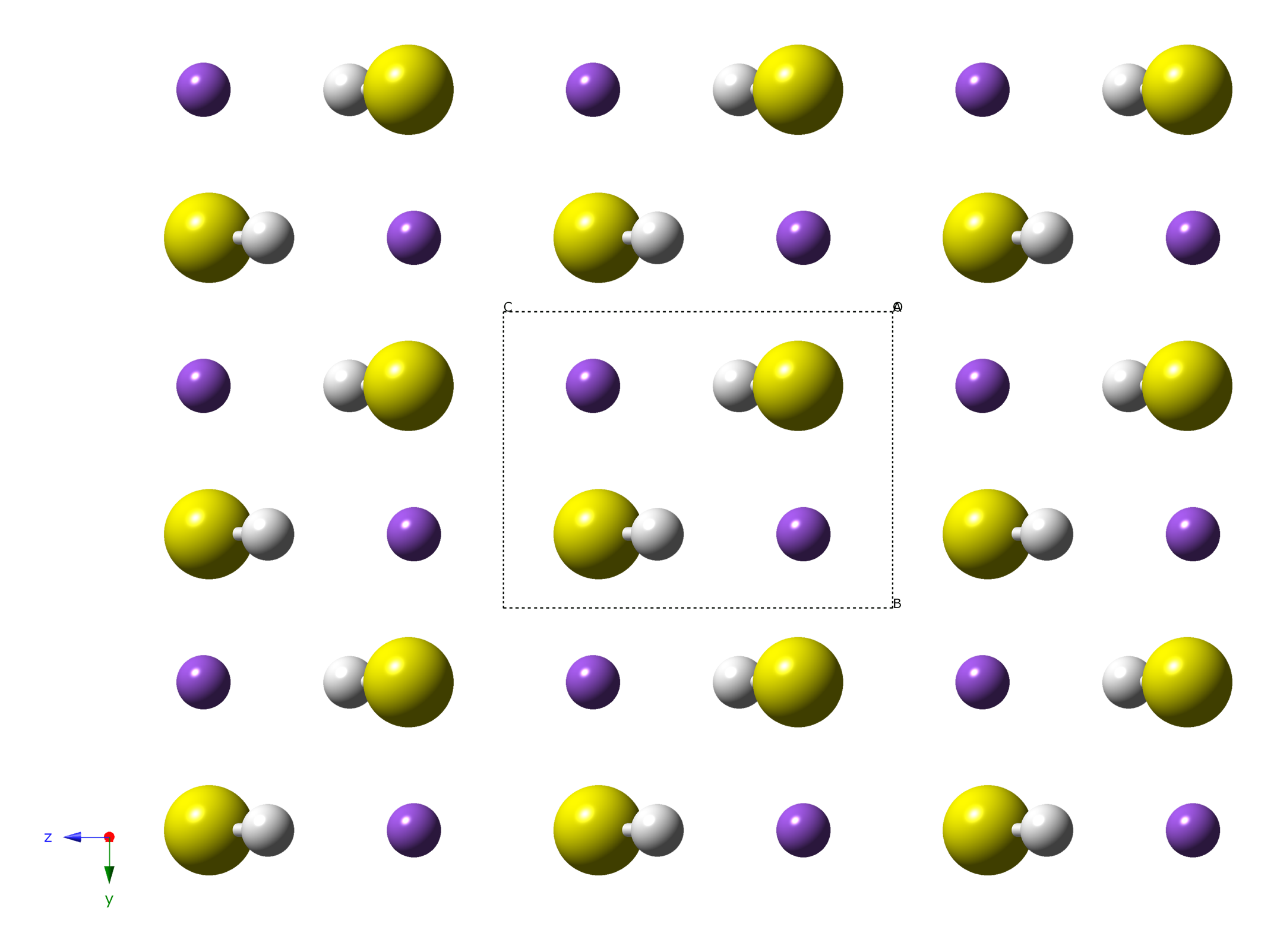
Atomic structure of crystalline NaSH according to X-ray crystallography. Color code: violet = Na, yellow = S, white = H.

Crystalline NaSH undergoes two phase transitions. At temperatures above 360 K, NaSH adopts the NaCl structure, which implies that the HS^{−} behaves as a spherical anion owing to its rapid rotation, leading to equal occupancy of eight equivalent positions. Below 360 K, a rhombohedral structure forms, and the HS^{−} sweeps out a discoidal shape. Below 114 K, the structure becomes monoclinic. The analogous rubidium and potassium compounds behave similarly.

NaSH has a relatively low melting point of 350 °C. In addition to the aforementioned anhydrous forms, it can be obtained as two hydrates, NaSH·2H_{2}O and NaSH·3H_{2}O. These three species are all colorless and behave similarly but not identically.

== Preparation ==
A laboratory synthesis entails treatment of sodium ethoxide (NaOEt) with hydrogen sulfide:

NaOCH_{2}CH_{3} + H_{2}S → NaSH + CH_{3}CH_{2}OH

An alternative method involves reaction of sodium with hydrogen sulfide.

== Applications ==
Thousands of tons of NaSH are produced annually. Its main uses are in cloth and paper manufacture as a makeup chemical for sulfur used in the kraft process, as a flotation agent in copper mining where it is used to activate oxide mineral species, and in the leather industry for the removal of hair from hides.
