= List of minor planets: 606001–607000 =

The following is a partial list of minor planets, running from minor-planet number 606001 through 607000, inclusive. The primary data for this and other partial lists is based on JPL's "Small-Body Orbital Elements" and data available from the Minor Planet Center. Critical list information is also provided by the MPC, unless otherwise specified from Lowell Observatory. A detailed description of the table's columns and additional sources are given on the main page including a complete list of every page in this series, and a statistical break-up on the dynamical classification of minor planets.

Also see the summary list of all named bodies in numerical and alphabetical order, and the corresponding naming citations for the number range of this particular list. New namings may only be added to this list after official publication, as the preannouncement of names is condemned by the Working Group for Small Bodies Nomenclature of the International Astronomical Union.

Near-Earth obj.	MBA (inner)	MBA (outer)	Centaur
Mars-crosser	MBA (middle)	Jupiter trojan	Trans-Neptunian obj.
Unclassified

== 606001–606100 ==
Designation			Discovery			Properties		Ref
Permanent	Provisional	Named after	Date	Site	Discoverer(s)	Category	Diam.	Ref
606001	2017 CB_{26}	—	January 30, 2006	Kitt Peak	Spacewatch	·	2.2 km	MPC · JPL
606002	2017 CW_{30}	—	September 9, 2015	Haleakala	Pan-STARRS 1	·	3.5 km	MPC · JPL
606003	2017 CO_{31}	—	December 14, 2010	Catalina	CSS	THB	2.5 km	MPC · JPL
606004	2017 DE_{6}	—	December 6, 2005	Mount Lemmon	Mount Lemmon Survey	·	3.1 km	MPC · JPL
606005	2017 DO_{7}	—	August 3, 2014	Haleakala	Pan-STARRS 1	·	2.0 km	MPC · JPL
606006	2017 DR_{7}	—	March 26, 2006	Mount Lemmon	Mount Lemmon Survey	·	3.1 km	MPC · JPL
606007	2017 DS_{8}	—	April 24, 2014	Mount Lemmon	Mount Lemmon Survey	·	1.5 km	MPC · JPL
606008	2017 DA_{9}	—	January 6, 2006	Catalina	CSS	·	3.1 km	MPC · JPL
606009	2017 DN_{9}	—	January 14, 2011	Mount Lemmon	Mount Lemmon Survey	·	3.8 km	MPC · JPL
606010	2017 DU_{13}	—	February 5, 2011	Catalina	CSS	·	3.6 km	MPC · JPL
606011	2017 DF_{15}	—	May 27, 2012	Kitt Peak	Spacewatch	H	660 m	MPC · JPL
606012	2017 DC_{18}	—	January 19, 2012	Haleakala	Pan-STARRS 1	TEL	1.1 km	MPC · JPL
606013	2017 DF_{19}	—	October 26, 2011	Haleakala	Pan-STARRS 1	·	1.5 km	MPC · JPL
606014	2017 DD_{21}	—	December 20, 2004	Mount Lemmon	Mount Lemmon Survey	L5	7.5 km	MPC · JPL
606015	2017 DG_{21}	—	July 29, 2015	Haleakala	Pan-STARRS 1	·	950 m	MPC · JPL
606016	2017 DB_{23}	—	January 27, 2017	Haleakala	Pan-STARRS 1	·	2.7 km	MPC · JPL
606017 Irimes	2017 DL_{25}	Irimes	August 23, 2015	La Palma	EURONEAR	·	2.2 km	MPC · JPL
606018	2017 DA_{32}	—	August 16, 2009	Catalina	CSS	T_{j} (2.99)	3.5 km	MPC · JPL
606019	2017 DM_{33}	—	September 22, 2009	Kitt Peak	Spacewatch	HYG	2.6 km	MPC · JPL
606020	2017 DG_{34}	—	February 23, 2017	Haleakala	Pan-STARRS 1	H	430 m	MPC · JPL
606021	2017 DY_{34}	—	April 26, 2012	Haleakala	Pan-STARRS 1	H	560 m	MPC · JPL
606022	2017 DM_{38}	—	September 20, 2003	Palomar	NEAT	·	4.2 km	MPC · JPL
606023	2017 DO_{43}	—	December 13, 2015	Haleakala	Pan-STARRS 1	·	2.9 km	MPC · JPL
606024	2017 DP_{47}	—	September 6, 1999	Kitt Peak	Spacewatch	·	2.3 km	MPC · JPL
606025	2017 DP_{49}	—	November 9, 2015	Mount Lemmon	Mount Lemmon Survey	·	2.2 km	MPC · JPL
606026	2017 DZ_{55}	—	October 15, 1999	Kitt Peak	Spacewatch	·	2.3 km	MPC · JPL
606027	2017 DB_{56}	—	March 22, 2012	Mount Lemmon	Mount Lemmon Survey	·	2.5 km	MPC · JPL
606028	2017 DK_{56}	—	November 12, 2010	Mount Lemmon	Mount Lemmon Survey	·	2.2 km	MPC · JPL
606029	2017 DQ_{57}	—	October 14, 1999	Kitt Peak	Spacewatch	·	2.2 km	MPC · JPL
606030	2017 DJ_{60}	—	August 31, 2005	Kitt Peak	Spacewatch	·	2.2 km	MPC · JPL
606031	2017 DL_{60}	—	January 11, 2011	Kitt Peak	Spacewatch	·	2.1 km	MPC · JPL
606032	2017 DG_{69}	—	February 27, 2008	Kitt Peak	Spacewatch	GEF	1.2 km	MPC · JPL
606033	2017 DJ_{69}	—	January 6, 2010	Kitt Peak	Spacewatch	·	820 m	MPC · JPL
606034	2017 DT_{77}	—	October 2, 2009	Mount Lemmon	Mount Lemmon Survey	·	3.7 km	MPC · JPL
606035	2017 DS_{79}	—	September 4, 2008	Kitt Peak	Spacewatch	T_{j} (2.99) · EUP	3.5 km	MPC · JPL
606036	2017 DO_{82}	—	January 26, 2017	Mount Lemmon	Mount Lemmon Survey	H	510 m	MPC · JPL
606037	2017 DQ_{83}	—	February 22, 2017	Mount Lemmon	Mount Lemmon Survey	·	1.8 km	MPC · JPL
606038	2017 DU_{83}	—	August 15, 2009	Kitt Peak	Spacewatch	·	3.0 km	MPC · JPL
606039	2017 DE_{85}	—	February 28, 2003	Haleakala	NEAT	·	1.6 km	MPC · JPL
606040	2017 DJ_{85}	—	November 9, 2004	Catalina	CSS	·	3.3 km	MPC · JPL
606041	2017 DK_{87}	—	March 4, 2006	Mount Bigelow	CSS	THB	3.1 km	MPC · JPL
606042	2017 DL_{100}	—	December 12, 2010	Mount Lemmon	Mount Lemmon Survey	THB	2.6 km	MPC · JPL
606043	2017 DH_{102}	—	September 30, 2006	Kitt Peak	Spacewatch	·	1.1 km	MPC · JPL
606044	2017 DV_{108}	—	December 2, 2010	Mount Lemmon	Mount Lemmon Survey	·	2.4 km	MPC · JPL
606045	2017 DM_{111}	—	February 24, 2012	Mount Lemmon	Mount Lemmon Survey	H	460 m	MPC · JPL
606046	2017 DY_{117}	—	December 10, 2005	Kitt Peak	Spacewatch	EOS	2.2 km	MPC · JPL
606047	2017 DF_{138}	—	February 22, 2017	Mount Lemmon	Mount Lemmon Survey	·	2.4 km	MPC · JPL
606048	2017 DY_{139}	—	February 25, 2017	Haleakala	Pan-STARRS 1	·	2.0 km	MPC · JPL
606049	2017 EA_{1}	—	March 4, 2017	Mount Lemmon	Mount Lemmon Survey	H	420 m	MPC · JPL
606050	2017 EX_{1}	—	March 6, 2017	Haleakala	Pan-STARRS 1	H	410 m	MPC · JPL
606051	2017 EF_{7}	—	November 3, 2010	Mount Lemmon	Mount Lemmon Survey	·	2.5 km	MPC · JPL
606052	2017 EK_{8}	—	March 24, 2001	Anderson Mesa	LONEOS	H	570 m	MPC · JPL
606053	2017 EQ_{10}	—	October 22, 2003	Kitt Peak	Spacewatch	T_{j} (2.92)	4.2 km	MPC · JPL
606054	2017 EV_{11}	—	September 15, 2009	Kitt Peak	Spacewatch	·	3.2 km	MPC · JPL
606055	2017 EA_{17}	—	April 19, 2006	Mount Lemmon	Mount Lemmon Survey	·	3.2 km	MPC · JPL
606056	2017 ER_{19}	—	September 21, 2009	Mount Lemmon	Mount Lemmon Survey	TIR	2.6 km	MPC · JPL
606057	2017 EB_{24}	—	December 6, 2015	Mount Lemmon	Mount Lemmon Survey	·	1.1 km	MPC · JPL
606058	2017 EN_{30}	—	March 7, 2017	Mount Lemmon	Mount Lemmon Survey	3:2	4.4 km	MPC · JPL
606059	2017 EU_{33}	—	March 4, 2017	Kitt Peak	Spacewatch	·	2.6 km	MPC · JPL
606060	2017 EE_{35}	—	November 26, 2009	Mount Lemmon	Mount Lemmon Survey	·	3.0 km	MPC · JPL
606061	2017 EQ_{40}	—	March 5, 2017	Haleakala	Pan-STARRS 1	·	1.2 km	MPC · JPL
606062	2017 FG	—	September 1, 2010	Mount Lemmon	Mount Lemmon Survey	H	410 m	MPC · JPL
606063	2017 FD_{2}	—	September 15, 2010	Mount Lemmon	Mount Lemmon Survey	H	550 m	MPC · JPL
606064	2017 FL_{3}	—	September 17, 2015	Catalina	CSS	·	2.6 km	MPC · JPL
606065	2017 FO_{4}	—	September 19, 2009	Kitt Peak	Spacewatch	·	2.4 km	MPC · JPL
606066	2017 FU_{4}	—	November 23, 2015	Mount Lemmon	Mount Lemmon Survey	EOS	1.3 km	MPC · JPL
606067	2017 FO_{27}	—	November 13, 2007	Mount Lemmon	Mount Lemmon Survey	(5)	850 m	MPC · JPL
606068	2017 FX_{45}	—	March 27, 2012	Mount Lemmon	Mount Lemmon Survey	·	1.9 km	MPC · JPL
606069	2017 FQ_{53}	—	September 18, 2014	Haleakala	Pan-STARRS 1	·	1.4 km	MPC · JPL
606070	2017 FU_{72}	—	March 5, 2006	Kitt Peak	Spacewatch	·	2.6 km	MPC · JPL
606071	2017 FR_{73}	—	November 2, 2015	Haleakala	Pan-STARRS 1	·	2.5 km	MPC · JPL
606072	2017 FO_{96}	—	October 10, 2005	Kitt Peak	Spacewatch	·	1.5 km	MPC · JPL
606073	2017 FA_{101}	—	March 2, 2006	Catalina	CSS	H	560 m	MPC · JPL
606074	2017 FX_{105}	—	March 31, 2003	Kitt Peak	Spacewatch	AGN	1.4 km	MPC · JPL
606075	2017 FG_{109}	—	September 14, 2005	Kitt Peak	Spacewatch	HOF	2.0 km	MPC · JPL
606076	2017 FE_{113}	—	May 13, 2008	Kitt Peak	Spacewatch	·	1.7 km	MPC · JPL
606077	2017 FK_{133}	—	February 12, 2005	La Silla	A. Boattini	·	4.6 km	MPC · JPL
606078	2017 FK_{142}	—	May 21, 2012	Mount Lemmon	Mount Lemmon Survey	VER	2.8 km	MPC · JPL
606079	2017 FW_{181}	—	March 31, 2017	Haleakala	Pan-STARRS 1	·	2.2 km	MPC · JPL
606080	2017 FW_{186}	—	March 20, 2017	Haleakala	Pan-STARRS 1	·	1.5 km	MPC · JPL
606081	2017 GQ_{1}	—	October 1, 2010	Catalina	CSS	·	2.4 km	MPC · JPL
606082	2017 GD_{4}	—	November 8, 2010	Catalina	CSS	H	600 m	MPC · JPL
606083	2017 GW_{5}	—	August 6, 2015	Haleakala	Pan-STARRS 1	H	440 m	MPC · JPL
606084	2017 GC_{6}	—	January 27, 2006	Catalina	CSS	H	650 m	MPC · JPL
606085	2017 GG_{7}	—	December 3, 2002	Palomar	NEAT	·	820 m	MPC · JPL
606086	2017 GM_{8}	—	December 17, 2004	Socorro	LINEAR	T_{j} (2.95)	3.0 km	MPC · JPL
606087	2017 GN_{16}	—	April 1, 2017	Haleakala	Pan-STARRS 1	·	450 m	MPC · JPL
606088	2017 HF_{5}	—	January 23, 2011	Mount Lemmon	Mount Lemmon Survey	H	570 m	MPC · JPL
606089	2017 HN_{7}	—	May 9, 2007	Mount Lemmon	Mount Lemmon Survey	·	1.2 km	MPC · JPL
606090	2017 HA_{11}	—	October 25, 2008	Kitt Peak	Spacewatch	·	750 m	MPC · JPL
606091	2017 HG_{12}	—	October 25, 2013	Mount Lemmon	Mount Lemmon Survey	3:2	4.7 km	MPC · JPL
606092	2017 HV_{18}	—	March 3, 2009	Mount Lemmon	Mount Lemmon Survey	3:2	4.7 km	MPC · JPL
606093	2017 HG_{22}	—	March 22, 2017	Haleakala	Pan-STARRS 1	·	800 m	MPC · JPL
606094	2017 HJ_{26}	—	September 2, 2013	Mount Lemmon	Mount Lemmon Survey	·	2.2 km	MPC · JPL
606095	2017 HM_{34}	—	November 8, 2008	Mount Lemmon	Mount Lemmon Survey	·	2.8 km	MPC · JPL
606096	2017 HO_{69}	—	April 30, 2017	Mount Lemmon	Mount Lemmon Survey	·	2.1 km	MPC · JPL
606097	2017 HZ_{83}	—	April 26, 2017	Haleakala	Pan-STARRS 1	·	1.3 km	MPC · JPL
606098	2017 KG_{1}	—	January 16, 2011	Mount Lemmon	Mount Lemmon Survey	·	2.8 km	MPC · JPL
606099	2017 KJ_{2}	—	April 29, 2001	Kitt Peak	Spacewatch	H	530 m	MPC · JPL
606100	2017 KK_{4}	—	May 22, 2017	Haleakala	Pan-STARRS 1	H	500 m	MPC · JPL

== 606101–606200 ==
back to top

Designation			Discovery			Properties		Ref
Permanent	Provisional	Named after	Date	Site	Discoverer(s)	Category	Diam.	Ref
606101	2017 KB_{8}	—	December 29, 2014	Mount Lemmon	Mount Lemmon Survey	3:2	5.2 km	MPC · JPL
606102	2017 KQ_{12}	—	July 27, 2014	Haleakala	Pan-STARRS 1	·	480 m	MPC · JPL
606103	2017 KE_{17}	—	April 4, 2017	Haleakala	Pan-STARRS 1	·	1.8 km	MPC · JPL
606104	2017 KX_{20}	—	June 19, 2009	Kitt Peak	Spacewatch	H	440 m	MPC · JPL
606105	2017 KJ_{24}	—	August 16, 2007	XuYi	PMO NEO Survey Program	·	3.6 km	MPC · JPL
606106	2017 KW_{24}	—	March 14, 2007	Kitt Peak	Spacewatch	·	440 m	MPC · JPL
606107	2017 KE_{26}	—	September 20, 2007	Kitt Peak	Spacewatch	VER	2.7 km	MPC · JPL
606108	2017 KN_{29}	—	November 27, 2014	Mount Lemmon	Mount Lemmon Survey	·	3.0 km	MPC · JPL
606109	2017 KQ_{30}	—	June 25, 2014	Mount Lemmon	Mount Lemmon Survey	·	510 m	MPC · JPL
606110	2017 KU_{30}	—	December 29, 2014	Haleakala	Pan-STARRS 1	·	3.3 km	MPC · JPL
606111	2017 KJ_{33}	—	November 16, 2009	Mount Lemmon	Mount Lemmon Survey	·	2.6 km	MPC · JPL
606112	2017 KQ_{33}	—	April 27, 2000	Kitt Peak	Spacewatch	·	2.9 km	MPC · JPL
606113	2017 KA_{34}	—	December 30, 2013	Mount Lemmon	Mount Lemmon Survey	H	460 m	MPC · JPL
606114	2017 KJ_{35}	—	October 20, 2007	Mount Lemmon	Mount Lemmon Survey	·	2.5 km	MPC · JPL
606115	2017 MT_{4}	—	February 28, 2014	Haleakala	Pan-STARRS 1	H	440 m	MPC · JPL
606116	2017 MU_{5}	—	June 21, 2010	Mount Lemmon	Mount Lemmon Survey	·	680 m	MPC · JPL
606117	2017 MX_{9}	—	April 6, 2011	Mount Lemmon	Mount Lemmon Survey	·	2.9 km	MPC · JPL
606118	2017 ME_{22}	—	June 25, 2017	Haleakala	Pan-STARRS 1	·	2.3 km	MPC · JPL
606119	2017 MM_{23}	—	April 5, 2016	Haleakala	Pan-STARRS 1	·	1.4 km	MPC · JPL
606120	2017 NO_{2}	—	August 21, 2006	Kitt Peak	Spacewatch	T_{j} (2.98)	3.6 km	MPC · JPL
606121	2017 NP_{2}	—	June 1, 2012	Mount Lemmon	Mount Lemmon Survey	·	1.7 km	MPC · JPL
606122	2017 NF_{3}	—	October 20, 2011	Mount Lemmon	Mount Lemmon Survey	·	570 m	MPC · JPL
606123	2017 NU_{3}	—	April 11, 2013	Kitt Peak	Spacewatch	·	1 km	MPC · JPL
606124	2017 NS_{4}	—	September 29, 2010	Mount Lemmon	Mount Lemmon Survey	MAS	610 m	MPC · JPL
606125	2017 NU_{4}	—	August 17, 2006	Palomar	NEAT	NYS	850 m	MPC · JPL
606126	2017 NV_{4}	—	May 17, 2012	Mount Lemmon	Mount Lemmon Survey	·	1.2 km	MPC · JPL
606127	2017 OE	—	July 22, 2010	Črni Vrh	Matičič, S.	·	880 m	MPC · JPL
606128	2017 OJ_{3}	—	October 31, 2002	Palomar	NEAT	T_{j} (2.98) · 3:2	4.2 km	MPC · JPL
606129	2017 OK_{5}	—	January 20, 2009	Kitt Peak	Spacewatch	·	620 m	MPC · JPL
606130	2017 OD_{6}	—	September 18, 2006	Apache Point	SDSS Collaboration	·	980 m	MPC · JPL
606131	2017 OC_{11}	—	January 12, 2011	Mount Lemmon	Mount Lemmon Survey	·	1.3 km	MPC · JPL
606132	2017 OB_{12}	—	January 18, 2012	Mount Lemmon	Mount Lemmon Survey	V	520 m	MPC · JPL
606133	2017 OS_{12}	—	November 1, 2007	Kitt Peak	Spacewatch	·	610 m	MPC · JPL
606134	2017 OW_{12}	—	August 27, 2014	Haleakala	Pan-STARRS 1	·	490 m	MPC · JPL
606135	2017 OQ_{24}	—	April 11, 2013	Mount Lemmon	Mount Lemmon Survey	V	450 m	MPC · JPL
606136	2017 OX_{26}	—	February 19, 2009	Mount Lemmon	Mount Lemmon Survey	PHO	710 m	MPC · JPL
606137	2017 OK_{28}	—	October 16, 2014	Mount Lemmon	Mount Lemmon Survey	·	670 m	MPC · JPL
606138	2017 OK_{49}	—	December 15, 2007	Kitt Peak	Spacewatch	·	1.2 km	MPC · JPL
606139	2017 OP_{51}	—	July 18, 2007	Mount Lemmon	Mount Lemmon Survey	·	740 m	MPC · JPL
606140	2017 OF_{52}	—	December 18, 2007	Piszkéstető	K. Sárneczky	·	800 m	MPC · JPL
606141	2017 OA_{55}	—	March 10, 2005	Mount Lemmon	Mount Lemmon Survey	·	1.0 km	MPC · JPL
606142	2017 OL_{55}	—	July 28, 2008	Siding Spring	SSS	·	1.3 km	MPC · JPL
606143	2017 OX_{55}	—	April 2, 2016	Haleakala	Pan-STARRS 1	GAL	1.5 km	MPC · JPL
606144	2017 OZ_{57}	—	September 16, 2003	Kitt Peak	Spacewatch	·	630 m	MPC · JPL
606145	2017 OB_{64}	—	May 30, 2003	Anderson Mesa	LONEOS	·	600 m	MPC · JPL
606146	2017 OE_{64}	—	March 26, 2009	Mount Lemmon	Mount Lemmon Survey	·	940 m	MPC · JPL
606147	2017 ON_{65}	—	October 17, 2010	Mount Lemmon	Mount Lemmon Survey	V	570 m	MPC · JPL
606148	2017 OK_{66}	—	October 27, 2012	Mount Lemmon	Mount Lemmon Survey	·	2.2 km	MPC · JPL
606149	2017 OS_{67}	—	June 23, 2017	Haleakala	Pan-STARRS 1	H	440 m	MPC · JPL
606150	2017 OR_{89}	—	July 30, 2017	Haleakala	Pan-STARRS 1	·	780 m	MPC · JPL
606151	2017 OF_{93}	—	May 20, 2015	Cerro Tololo	DECam	LIX	2.5 km	MPC · JPL
606152	2017 OR_{101}	—	July 30, 2017	Haleakala	Pan-STARRS 1	·	800 m	MPC · JPL
606153	2017 OV_{126}	—	December 28, 2014	Mount Lemmon	Mount Lemmon Survey	·	930 m	MPC · JPL
606154	2017 PH	—	September 30, 2010	Mount Lemmon	Mount Lemmon Survey	·	790 m	MPC · JPL
606155	2017 PX_{6}	—	July 22, 2017	Haleakala	Pan-STARRS 1	·	1.8 km	MPC · JPL
606156	2017 PB_{10}	—	April 2, 2005	Kitt Peak	Spacewatch	MAS	560 m	MPC · JPL
606157	2017 PN_{12}	—	September 27, 1995	Kitt Peak	Spacewatch	MAS	520 m	MPC · JPL
606158	2017 PD_{13}	—	July 1, 2013	Haleakala	Pan-STARRS 1	·	920 m	MPC · JPL
606159	2017 PN_{13}	—	April 4, 2005	Mount Lemmon	Mount Lemmon Survey	MAS	670 m	MPC · JPL
606160	2017 PF_{14}	—	September 21, 2003	Kitt Peak	Spacewatch	·	720 m	MPC · JPL
606161	2017 PA_{17}	—	September 19, 2006	Catalina	CSS	·	1.2 km	MPC · JPL
606162	2017 PP_{17}	—	February 15, 2015	Haleakala	Pan-STARRS 1	EOS	1.6 km	MPC · JPL
606163	2017 PU_{31}	—	January 30, 2016	Mount Lemmon	Mount Lemmon Survey	·	730 m	MPC · JPL
606164	2017 PQ_{32}	—	July 16, 2013	Haleakala	Pan-STARRS 1	·	1.8 km	MPC · JPL
606165	2017 PT_{33}	—	November 25, 2005	Mount Lemmon	Mount Lemmon Survey	·	1.2 km	MPC · JPL
606166	2017 PD_{36}	—	January 2, 2009	Mount Lemmon	Mount Lemmon Survey	EOS	1.6 km	MPC · JPL
606167	2017 PH_{37}	—	May 7, 2010	Mount Lemmon	Mount Lemmon Survey	·	640 m	MPC · JPL
606168	2017 PO_{38}	—	May 1, 2003	Kitt Peak	Spacewatch	·	690 m	MPC · JPL
606169	2017 PX_{39}	—	March 26, 2006	Mount Lemmon	Mount Lemmon Survey	NYS	730 m	MPC · JPL
606170	2017 PM_{41}	—	November 25, 2005	Kitt Peak	Spacewatch	·	1.8 km	MPC · JPL
606171	2017 PY_{41}	—	August 1, 2017	Haleakala	Pan-STARRS 1	·	2.3 km	MPC · JPL
606172	2017 PM_{53}	—	August 3, 2017	Haleakala	Pan-STARRS 1	·	780 m	MPC · JPL
606173	2017 QT_{4}	—	December 19, 2004	Mount Lemmon	Mount Lemmon Survey	·	550 m	MPC · JPL
606174	2017 QB_{6}	—	September 6, 2010	Piszkés-tető	K. Sárneczky, Z. Kuli	·	700 m	MPC · JPL
606175	2017 QX_{7}	—	April 9, 2010	Mount Lemmon	Mount Lemmon Survey	·	480 m	MPC · JPL
606176	2017 QO_{9}	—	October 20, 2003	Kitt Peak	Spacewatch	MAS	500 m	MPC · JPL
606177	2017 QQ_{11}	—	September 19, 2006	Kitt Peak	Spacewatch	·	2.3 km	MPC · JPL
606178	2017 QX_{12}	—	January 22, 2006	Mount Lemmon	Mount Lemmon Survey	·	610 m	MPC · JPL
606179	2017 QB_{14}	—	October 26, 2011	Haleakala	Pan-STARRS 1	·	500 m	MPC · JPL
606180	2017 QC_{14}	—	October 30, 2011	Kitt Peak	Spacewatch	·	560 m	MPC · JPL
606181	2017 QD_{14}	—	October 19, 2003	Apache Point	SDSS Collaboration	·	840 m	MPC · JPL
606182	2017 QM_{19}	—	April 20, 2012	Mount Lemmon	Mount Lemmon Survey	·	1.1 km	MPC · JPL
606183	2017 QN_{22}	—	December 22, 2008	Kitt Peak	Spacewatch	·	600 m	MPC · JPL
606184	2017 QP_{23}	—	September 19, 2014	Haleakala	Pan-STARRS 1	·	800 m	MPC · JPL
606185	2017 QA_{26}	—	November 9, 2013	Haleakala	Pan-STARRS 1	·	1.3 km	MPC · JPL
606186	2017 QB_{31}	—	October 2, 2000	Socorro	LINEAR	·	1.6 km	MPC · JPL
606187	2017 QO_{33}	—	August 16, 2017	Haleakala	Pan-STARRS 1	damocloid · critical · unusual	10 km	MPC · JPL
606188	2017 QL_{37}	—	November 10, 2005	Catalina	CSS	·	900 m	MPC · JPL
606189	2017 QY_{38}	—	January 4, 2016	Haleakala	Pan-STARRS 1	·	830 m	MPC · JPL
606190	2017 QK_{39}	—	February 5, 2011	Haleakala	Pan-STARRS 1	·	1.5 km	MPC · JPL
606191	2017 QQ_{40}	—	May 1, 2013	Mount Lemmon	Mount Lemmon Survey	MAS	460 m	MPC · JPL
606192	2017 QY_{41}	—	July 4, 2010	Kitt Peak	Spacewatch	·	960 m	MPC · JPL
606193	2017 QT_{44}	—	October 20, 2007	Mount Lemmon	Mount Lemmon Survey	·	1.9 km	MPC · JPL
606194	2017 QH_{45}	—	April 5, 2011	Mount Lemmon	Mount Lemmon Survey	·	1.4 km	MPC · JPL
606195	2017 QL_{50}	—	December 29, 2011	Mount Lemmon	Mount Lemmon Survey	·	530 m	MPC · JPL
606196	2017 QL_{54}	—	December 19, 2009	Mount Lemmon	Mount Lemmon Survey	·	1.6 km	MPC · JPL
606197	2017 QR_{54}	—	June 20, 2006	Mount Lemmon	Mount Lemmon Survey	·	800 m	MPC · JPL
606198	2017 QJ_{56}	—	September 17, 1995	Kitt Peak	Spacewatch	HYG	2.5 km	MPC · JPL
606199	2017 QC_{58}	—	January 21, 2015	Haleakala	Pan-STARRS 1	AGN	990 m	MPC · JPL
606200	2017 QJ_{59}	—	November 16, 2006	Mount Lemmon	Mount Lemmon Survey	NYS	910 m	MPC · JPL

== 606201–606300 ==
back to top

Designation			Discovery			Properties		Ref
Permanent	Provisional	Named after	Date	Site	Discoverer(s)	Category	Diam.	Ref
606201	2017 QB_{60}	—	October 16, 2014	Nogales	M. Schwartz, P. R. Holvorcem	·	670 m	MPC · JPL
606202	2017 QJ_{60}	—	June 18, 2013	Mount Lemmon	Mount Lemmon Survey	MAS	630 m	MPC · JPL
606203	2017 QL_{60}	—	March 1, 2005	Kitt Peak	Spacewatch	MAS	780 m	MPC · JPL
606204	2017 QP_{60}	—	January 19, 2012	Haleakala	Pan-STARRS 1	·	1.0 km	MPC · JPL
606205	2017 QQ_{60}	—	October 10, 2012	Haleakala	Pan-STARRS 1	·	2.3 km	MPC · JPL
606206	2017 QH_{61}	—	August 7, 2010	XuYi	PMO NEO Survey Program	·	750 m	MPC · JPL
606207	2017 QK_{65}	—	May 29, 2008	Mount Lemmon	Mount Lemmon Survey	·	2.0 km	MPC · JPL
606208	2017 QB_{67}	—	March 6, 2011	Mount Lemmon	Mount Lemmon Survey	·	1.4 km	MPC · JPL
606209	2017 QO_{109}	—	January 11, 2014	Mauna Kea	Kotson, M. C., D. J. Tholen	·	3.0 km	MPC · JPL
606210	2017 QM_{118}	—	August 24, 2017	Haleakala	Pan-STARRS 1	·	2.1 km	MPC · JPL
606211	2017 RD	—	December 9, 2012	Catalina	CSS	H	550 m	MPC · JPL
606212	2017 RY	—	December 10, 2010	Socorro	LINEAR	PHO	1 km	MPC · JPL
606213	2017 RN_{8}	—	July 14, 2013	Haleakala	Pan-STARRS 1	·	980 m	MPC · JPL
606214	2017 RZ_{11}	—	November 17, 2008	Kitt Peak	Spacewatch	KOR	1.0 km	MPC · JPL
606215	2017 RE_{13}	—	October 26, 2014	Mount Lemmon	Mount Lemmon Survey	·	640 m	MPC · JPL
606216	2017 RR_{13}	—	February 6, 2008	Kitt Peak	Spacewatch	MAS	670 m	MPC · JPL
606217	2017 RE_{18}	—	October 24, 2013	Mount Lemmon	Mount Lemmon Survey	·	1.4 km	MPC · JPL
606218	2017 RJ_{22}	—	August 13, 2010	Kitt Peak	Spacewatch	(2076)	720 m	MPC · JPL
606219	2017 RZ_{22}	—	August 23, 2001	Kitt Peak	Spacewatch	·	780 m	MPC · JPL
606220	2017 RX_{23}	—	February 28, 2009	Kitt Peak	Spacewatch	·	880 m	MPC · JPL
606221	2017 RA_{28}	—	April 21, 2009	Mount Lemmon	Mount Lemmon Survey	V	500 m	MPC · JPL
606222	2017 RY_{32}	—	October 18, 2003	Apache Point	SDSS	NYS	700 m	MPC · JPL
606223	2017 RL_{33}	—	March 10, 2005	Mount Lemmon	Mount Lemmon Survey	·	1.1 km	MPC · JPL
606224	2017 RD_{34}	—	January 3, 2014	Catalina	CSS	·	2.7 km	MPC · JPL
606225	2017 RY_{34}	—	November 29, 2014	Kitt Peak	Spacewatch	·	700 m	MPC · JPL
606226	2017 RA_{35}	—	October 30, 2007	Mount Lemmon	Mount Lemmon Survey	·	790 m	MPC · JPL
606227	2017 RL_{36}	—	October 19, 2006	Kitt Peak	Deep Ecliptic Survey	MAS	540 m	MPC · JPL
606228	2017 RW_{36}	—	April 17, 2005	Kitt Peak	Spacewatch	·	880 m	MPC · JPL
606229	2017 RB_{40}	—	February 8, 2008	Kitt Peak	Spacewatch	·	970 m	MPC · JPL
606230	2017 RA_{41}	—	September 15, 2010	Kitt Peak	Spacewatch	·	1.0 km	MPC · JPL
606231	2017 RA_{42}	—	September 26, 2006	Kitt Peak	Spacewatch	NYS	900 m	MPC · JPL
606232	2017 RW_{49}	—	August 17, 2012	Haleakala	Pan-STARRS 1	KOR	1.0 km	MPC · JPL
606233	2017 RN_{51}	—	July 15, 2013	Haleakala	Pan-STARRS 1	·	910 m	MPC · JPL
606234	2017 RZ_{55}	—	September 27, 1995	Kitt Peak	Spacewatch	·	2.4 km	MPC · JPL
606235	2017 RB_{56}	—	February 24, 2012	Mount Lemmon	Mount Lemmon Survey	·	940 m	MPC · JPL
606236	2017 RN_{57}	—	October 10, 2012	Mount Lemmon	Mount Lemmon Survey	EOS	1.6 km	MPC · JPL
606237	2017 RB_{60}	—	August 4, 2013	Haleakala	Pan-STARRS 1	·	700 m	MPC · JPL
606238	2017 RO_{60}	—	March 8, 2008	Kitt Peak	Spacewatch	CLA	1.1 km	MPC · JPL
606239	2017 RO_{62}	—	November 24, 2014	Mount Lemmon	Mount Lemmon Survey	·	650 m	MPC · JPL
606240	2017 RV_{62}	—	September 28, 2003	Anderson Mesa	LONEOS	·	1.9 km	MPC · JPL
606241	2017 RK_{63}	—	February 24, 2012	Kitt Peak	Spacewatch	MAS	570 m	MPC · JPL
606242	2017 RL_{70}	—	September 6, 2008	Kitt Peak	Spacewatch	AGN	920 m	MPC · JPL
606243	2017 RH_{71}	—	April 15, 2013	Haleakala	Pan-STARRS 1	·	530 m	MPC · JPL
606244	2017 RP_{73}	—	February 17, 2015	Haleakala	Pan-STARRS 1	KOR	1.2 km	MPC · JPL
606245	2017 RZ_{76}	—	May 15, 2005	Mount Lemmon	Mount Lemmon Survey	MAS	640 m	MPC · JPL
606246	2017 RD_{77}	—	November 18, 2007	Mount Lemmon	Mount Lemmon Survey	·	850 m	MPC · JPL
606247	2017 RF_{78}	—	October 3, 2006	Mount Lemmon	Mount Lemmon Survey	·	880 m	MPC · JPL
606248	2017 RU_{78}	—	February 16, 2015	Haleakala	Pan-STARRS 1	·	1.7 km	MPC · JPL
606249	2017 RA_{82}	—	February 26, 2015	Mount Lemmon	Mount Lemmon Survey	·	2.5 km	MPC · JPL
606250	2017 RB_{82}	—	September 17, 2012	Mount Lemmon	Mount Lemmon Survey	·	1.3 km	MPC · JPL
606251	2017 RA_{86}	—	September 4, 2008	Kitt Peak	Spacewatch	·	1.5 km	MPC · JPL
606252	2017 RU_{87}	—	August 21, 2006	Kitt Peak	Spacewatch	·	2.0 km	MPC · JPL
606253	2017 RM_{88}	—	October 28, 2010	Mount Lemmon	Mount Lemmon Survey	·	700 m	MPC · JPL
606254	2017 RC_{89}	—	July 14, 2013	Haleakala	Pan-STARRS 1	NYS	760 m	MPC · JPL
606255	2017 RP_{89}	—	January 3, 2012	Mount Lemmon	Mount Lemmon Survey	·	550 m	MPC · JPL
606256	2017 RS_{89}	—	August 10, 2013	Kitt Peak	Spacewatch	·	990 m	MPC · JPL
606257	2017 RS_{93}	—	September 16, 2010	Mount Lemmon	Mount Lemmon Survey	·	900 m	MPC · JPL
606258	2017 RB_{94}	—	September 18, 2006	Kitt Peak	Spacewatch	·	1.0 km	MPC · JPL
606259	2017 RG_{94}	—	September 22, 2003	Kitt Peak	Spacewatch	·	1.3 km	MPC · JPL
606260	2017 RU_{95}	—	March 13, 2013	Kitt Peak	Spacewatch	·	610 m	MPC · JPL
606261	2017 RL_{96}	—	March 31, 2009	Mount Lemmon	Mount Lemmon Survey	·	610 m	MPC · JPL
606262	2017 RJ_{97}	—	September 30, 2006	Mount Lemmon	Mount Lemmon Survey	NYS	950 m	MPC · JPL
606263	2017 RH_{99}	—	September 17, 2006	Kitt Peak	Spacewatch	·	950 m	MPC · JPL
606264	2017 RU_{99}	—	October 20, 2006	Mount Lemmon	Mount Lemmon Survey	·	2.2 km	MPC · JPL
606265	2017 RR_{102}	—	October 21, 2003	Kitt Peak	Spacewatch	KOR	1.2 km	MPC · JPL
606266	2017 RD_{134}	—	February 13, 2015	Mount Lemmon	Mount Lemmon Survey	·	540 m	MPC · JPL
606267	2017 SG_{7}	—	October 26, 2013	Mount Lemmon	Mount Lemmon Survey	·	1.9 km	MPC · JPL
606268	2017 SM_{7}	—	December 23, 2014	Mount Lemmon	Mount Lemmon Survey	·	570 m	MPC · JPL
606269	2017 SN_{13}	—	April 4, 2008	Kitt Peak	Spacewatch	H	380 m	MPC · JPL
606270	2017 SE_{14}	—	November 20, 2014	Mount Lemmon	Mount Lemmon Survey	·	950 m	MPC · JPL
606271	2017 SP_{15}	—	August 24, 2006	Palomar	NEAT	MAS	650 m	MPC · JPL
606272	2017 SR_{24}	—	September 11, 2004	Kitt Peak	Spacewatch	·	480 m	MPC · JPL
606273	2017 SD_{26}	—	January 19, 2012	Haleakala	Pan-STARRS 1	·	810 m	MPC · JPL
606274	2017 SY_{28}	—	February 14, 2013	Mount Lemmon	Mount Lemmon Survey	·	2.7 km	MPC · JPL
606275	2017 SS_{30}	—	September 6, 1996	Kitt Peak	Spacewatch	·	1.5 km	MPC · JPL
606276	2017 SE_{34}	—	September 8, 2010	Kitt Peak	Spacewatch	·	780 m	MPC · JPL
606277	2017 SE_{38}	—	September 21, 2017	Haleakala	Pan-STARRS 1	TIR	2.5 km	MPC · JPL
606278	2017 SG_{38}	—	December 15, 2001	Apache Point	SDSS Collaboration	·	3.2 km	MPC · JPL
606279	2017 SH_{38}	—	September 27, 2006	Catalina	CSS	·	3.6 km	MPC · JPL
606280	2017 SH_{39}	—	September 25, 2006	Catalina	CSS	·	1.2 km	MPC · JPL
606281	2017 SS_{41}	—	January 13, 2002	Palomar	NEAT	·	3.0 km	MPC · JPL
606282	2017 SF_{42}	—	April 27, 2012	Haleakala	Pan-STARRS 1	·	770 m	MPC · JPL
606283	2017 SC_{45}	—	October 21, 2003	Palomar	NEAT	V	620 m	MPC · JPL
606284	2017 SD_{48}	—	July 12, 2013	Haleakala	Pan-STARRS 1	·	840 m	MPC · JPL
606285	2017 SS_{49}	—	November 1, 2013	Kitt Peak	Spacewatch	·	1.3 km	MPC · JPL
606286	2017 SY_{51}	—	November 26, 2014	Mount Lemmon	Mount Lemmon Survey	·	580 m	MPC · JPL
606287	2017 SZ_{51}	—	October 17, 2010	Mount Lemmon	Mount Lemmon Survey	CLA	1.4 km	MPC · JPL
606288	2017 SL_{53}	—	February 10, 2016	Haleakala	Pan-STARRS 1	V	460 m	MPC · JPL
606289	2017 SX_{55}	—	May 12, 2005	Mount Lemmon	Mount Lemmon Survey	·	1.1 km	MPC · JPL
606290	2017 SV_{59}	—	June 10, 2005	Kitt Peak	Spacewatch	·	1.2 km	MPC · JPL
606291	2017 SZ_{61}	—	February 16, 2012	Haleakala	Pan-STARRS 1	V	450 m	MPC · JPL
606292	2017 ST_{64}	—	February 17, 2005	La Silla	A. Boattini	·	610 m	MPC · JPL
606293	2017 ST_{68}	—	November 9, 2007	Mount Lemmon	Mount Lemmon Survey	·	1.7 km	MPC · JPL
606294	2017 SO_{72}	—	February 10, 2008	Kitt Peak	Spacewatch	·	860 m	MPC · JPL
606295	2017 SY_{73}	—	November 12, 2013	Mount Lemmon	Mount Lemmon Survey	KOR	1.2 km	MPC · JPL
606296	2017 SW_{77}	—	April 11, 2015	Mount Lemmon	Mount Lemmon Survey	KOR	1.0 km	MPC · JPL
606297	2017 SD_{78}	—	September 13, 2002	Palomar	NEAT	NYS	920 m	MPC · JPL
606298	2017 SM_{78}	—	June 22, 2009	Mount Lemmon	Mount Lemmon Survey	·	820 m	MPC · JPL
606299	2017 SR_{78}	—	October 9, 2010	Mount Lemmon	Mount Lemmon Survey	·	770 m	MPC · JPL
606300	2017 SH_{79}	—	October 9, 2004	Kitt Peak	Spacewatch	·	550 m	MPC · JPL

== 606301–606400 ==
back to top

Designation			Discovery			Properties		Ref
Permanent	Provisional	Named after	Date	Site	Discoverer(s)	Category	Diam.	Ref
606301	2017 SV_{79}	—	December 16, 2014	Haleakala	Pan-STARRS 1	·	660 m	MPC · JPL
606302	2017 SY_{80}	—	November 22, 2014	Mount Lemmon	Mount Lemmon Survey	·	830 m	MPC · JPL
606303	2017 SL_{81}	—	December 3, 2005	Mauna Kea	A. Boattini	·	640 m	MPC · JPL
606304	2017 SM_{81}	—	September 15, 2006	Kitt Peak	Spacewatch	·	2.1 km	MPC · JPL
606305	2017 SB_{87}	—	April 27, 2012	Haleakala	Pan-STARRS 1	·	850 m	MPC · JPL
606306	2017 ST_{88}	—	September 14, 2006	Catalina	CSS	V	620 m	MPC · JPL
606307	2017 SM_{90}	—	January 17, 2015	Haleakala	Pan-STARRS 1	·	1.5 km	MPC · JPL
606308	2017 SQ_{90}	—	April 12, 2005	Kitt Peak	Spacewatch	·	970 m	MPC · JPL
606309	2017 SG_{92}	—	March 10, 2005	Mount Lemmon	Mount Lemmon Survey	·	1.0 km	MPC · JPL
606310	2017 SX_{96}	—	June 17, 2013	Mount Lemmon	Mount Lemmon Survey	·	1.0 km	MPC · JPL
606311	2017 SF_{97}	—	April 22, 2009	Mount Lemmon	Mount Lemmon Survey	MAS	710 m	MPC · JPL
606312	2017 SZ_{99}	—	August 24, 2017	Haleakala	Pan-STARRS 1	HNS	600 m	MPC · JPL
606313	2017 SX_{101}	—	August 16, 2017	Haleakala	Pan-STARRS 1	·	1.6 km	MPC · JPL
606314	2017 SY_{105}	—	October 9, 2008	Mount Lemmon	Mount Lemmon Survey	·	1.8 km	MPC · JPL
606315	2017 SD_{112}	—	September 20, 2007	Catalina	CSS	PHO	730 m	MPC · JPL
606316	2017 SP_{116}	—	September 20, 2006	Catalina	CSS	·	1.3 km	MPC · JPL
606317	2017 SJ_{118}	—	September 22, 2003	Palomar	NEAT	·	610 m	MPC · JPL
606318	2017 SW_{119}	—	October 2, 2006	Mount Lemmon	Mount Lemmon Survey	·	920 m	MPC · JPL
606319	2017 SQ_{120}	—	January 31, 2009	Kitt Peak	Spacewatch	·	450 m	MPC · JPL
606320	2017 SX_{120}	—	April 16, 2005	Kitt Peak	Spacewatch	·	780 m	MPC · JPL
606321	2017 SJ_{124}	—	October 2, 2006	Mount Lemmon	Mount Lemmon Survey	NYS	1.1 km	MPC · JPL
606322	2017 SW_{126}	—	January 19, 2012	Mount Lemmon	Mount Lemmon Survey	·	510 m	MPC · JPL
606323	2017 SG_{128}	—	May 13, 2007	Kitt Peak	Spacewatch	·	1.7 km	MPC · JPL
606324	2017 SY_{143}	—	November 17, 2012	Mount Lemmon	Mount Lemmon Survey	·	2.5 km	MPC · JPL
606325	2017 SK_{165}	—	January 27, 2015	Haleakala	Pan-STARRS 1	·	960 m	MPC · JPL
606326	2017 SX_{188}	—	September 25, 2017	Haleakala	Pan-STARRS 1	H	320 m	MPC · JPL
606327	2017 SB_{207}	—	September 26, 2017	Haleakala	Pan-STARRS 1	·	460 m	MPC · JPL
606328	2017 SC_{275}	—	April 14, 2015	Mount Lemmon	Mount Lemmon Survey	HOF	2.1 km	MPC · JPL
606329	2017 SG_{277}	—	January 23, 2015	Haleakala	Pan-STARRS 1	·	1.2 km	MPC · JPL
606330	2017 TU_{2}	—	November 4, 2012	Haleakala	Pan-STARRS 1	H	470 m	MPC · JPL
606331	2017 TX_{10}	—	August 3, 2017	Haleakala	Pan-STARRS 1	·	3.1 km	MPC · JPL
606332	2017 TR_{30}	—	October 12, 2017	Mount Lemmon	Mount Lemmon Survey	·	710 m	MPC · JPL
606333	2017 UV	—	September 2, 2005	Palomar	NEAT	T_{j} (2.9)	4.4 km	MPC · JPL
606334	2017 UX_{1}	—	March 29, 2011	Mount Lemmon	Mount Lemmon Survey	H	420 m	MPC · JPL
606335	2017 UG_{2}	—	May 1, 2006	Mauna Kea	P. A. Wiegert	·	600 m	MPC · JPL
606336	2017 UO_{4}	—	June 15, 2006	Kitt Peak	Spacewatch	PHO	860 m	MPC · JPL
606337	2017 UW_{8}	—	October 19, 2003	Palomar	NEAT	·	910 m	MPC · JPL
606338	2017 UW_{13}	—	May 31, 2003	Cerro Tololo	Deep Ecliptic Survey	·	740 m	MPC · JPL
606339 Kierpiec	2017 UY_{13}	Kierpiec	October 24, 2014	Tincana	M. Kusiak, M. Żołnowski	·	550 m	MPC · JPL
606340	2017 UH_{14}	—	November 17, 2014	Mount Lemmon	Mount Lemmon Survey	·	420 m	MPC · JPL
606341	2017 UE_{15}	—	October 2, 2003	Kitt Peak	Spacewatch	·	2.0 km	MPC · JPL
606342	2017 UH_{19}	—	August 14, 2013	Haleakala	Pan-STARRS 1	·	960 m	MPC · JPL
606343	2017 UN_{20}	—	August 4, 2013	Haleakala	Pan-STARRS 1	MAS	710 m	MPC · JPL
606344	2017 UB_{23}	—	October 19, 2012	Haleakala	Pan-STARRS 1	·	2.3 km	MPC · JPL
606345	2017 UY_{23}	—	September 28, 2003	Kitt Peak	Spacewatch	·	860 m	MPC · JPL
606346	2017 UN_{24}	—	August 30, 2002	Kitt Peak	Spacewatch	·	2.0 km	MPC · JPL
606347	2017 UC_{26}	—	March 30, 2016	Haleakala	Pan-STARRS 1	·	940 m	MPC · JPL
606348	2017 UY_{27}	—	August 10, 2013	Kitt Peak	Spacewatch	NYS	780 m	MPC · JPL
606349	2017 UV_{31}	—	December 6, 2008	Kitt Peak	Spacewatch	·	1.3 km	MPC · JPL
606350	2017 UO_{34}	—	September 22, 2008	Mount Lemmon	Mount Lemmon Survey	·	2.5 km	MPC · JPL
606351	2017 UT_{34}	—	February 14, 2009	Mount Lemmon	Mount Lemmon Survey	·	1.9 km	MPC · JPL
606352	2017 UM_{35}	—	December 6, 2007	Mount Lemmon	Mount Lemmon Survey	·	2.3 km	MPC · JPL
606353	2017 UO_{37}	—	May 20, 2015	Cerro Tololo	DECam	·	1.1 km	MPC · JPL
606354	2017 UX_{37}	—	September 22, 2017	Haleakala	Pan-STARRS 1	·	2.8 km	MPC · JPL
606355	2017 US_{39}	—	August 17, 2006	Palomar	NEAT	·	1.3 km	MPC · JPL
606356	2017 UJ_{41}	—	November 11, 2013	Kitt Peak	Spacewatch	·	1.1 km	MPC · JPL
606357	2017 UV_{43}	—	March 13, 2005	Mount Lemmon	Mount Lemmon Survey	T_{j} (2.96) · unusual	10 km	MPC · JPL
606358	2017 UF_{44}	—	August 28, 2009	La Sagra	OAM	H	450 m	MPC · JPL
606359	2017 UG_{44}	—	January 13, 2005	Socorro	LINEAR	H	570 m	MPC · JPL
606360	2017 UG_{48}	—	March 5, 2002	Apache Point	SDSS Collaboration	·	2.6 km	MPC · JPL
606361	2017 UZ_{50}	—	October 18, 2009	Catalina	CSS	H	410 m	MPC · JPL
606362	2017 UY_{54}	—	October 28, 2017	Haleakala	Pan-STARRS 1	·	960 m	MPC · JPL
606363	2017 UC_{94}	—	October 28, 2017	Haleakala	Pan-STARRS 1	MIS	2.0 km	MPC · JPL
606364	2017 UO_{106}	—	February 8, 2011	Mount Lemmon	Mount Lemmon Survey	·	1.0 km	MPC · JPL
606365	2017 UU_{109}	—	April 20, 2015	Haleakala	Pan-STARRS 1	·	1.1 km	MPC · JPL
606366	2017 UB_{155}	—	October 28, 2008	Kitt Peak	Spacewatch	·	1.3 km	MPC · JPL
606367	2017 VB	—	November 2, 2017	Haleakala	Pan-STARRS 1	APO +1km	1.6 km	MPC · JPL
606368	2017 VO_{1}	—	June 2, 2014	Mount Lemmon	Mount Lemmon Survey	H	460 m	MPC · JPL
606369	2017 VR_{1}	—	August 8, 2017	Haleakala	Pan-STARRS 1	·	1.3 km	MPC · JPL
606370	2017 VR_{9}	—	August 24, 2003	Socorro	LINEAR	·	880 m	MPC · JPL
606371	2017 VF_{10}	—	July 29, 2008	Mount Lemmon	Mount Lemmon Survey	·	1.5 km	MPC · JPL
606372	2017 VU_{10}	—	February 1, 2009	Kitt Peak	Spacewatch	·	2.1 km	MPC · JPL
606373	2017 VN_{11}	—	February 5, 2011	Mount Lemmon	Mount Lemmon Survey	·	1.0 km	MPC · JPL
606374	2017 VM_{16}	—	July 5, 2016	Haleakala	Pan-STARRS 1	·	2.2 km	MPC · JPL
606375	2017 VG_{17}	—	December 15, 2007	Mount Lemmon	Mount Lemmon Survey	·	1.5 km	MPC · JPL
606376	2017 VY_{17}	—	November 4, 2007	Kitt Peak	Spacewatch	·	460 m	MPC · JPL
606377	2017 VH_{18}	—	December 31, 2008	Mount Lemmon	Mount Lemmon Survey	·	2.0 km	MPC · JPL
606378	2017 VO_{18}	—	September 4, 2011	Kitt Peak	Spacewatch	·	2.4 km	MPC · JPL
606379	2017 VT_{18}	—	December 3, 2012	Mount Lemmon	Mount Lemmon Survey	EOS	1.4 km	MPC · JPL
606380	2017 VK_{19}	—	October 2, 2006	Kitt Peak	Spacewatch	·	2.2 km	MPC · JPL
606381	2017 VC_{23}	—	August 26, 2013	Haleakala	Pan-STARRS 1	·	670 m	MPC · JPL
606382	2017 VP_{23}	—	November 23, 2009	Mount Lemmon	Mount Lemmon Survey	EUN	770 m	MPC · JPL
606383	2017 VB_{27}	—	September 25, 2006	Mount Lemmon	Mount Lemmon Survey	HYG	2.3 km	MPC · JPL
606384	2017 VJ_{27}	—	November 26, 2005	Mount Lemmon	Mount Lemmon Survey	·	710 m	MPC · JPL
606385	2017 VK_{27}	—	October 20, 2006	Kitt Peak	Spacewatch	·	1.8 km	MPC · JPL
606386	2017 VH_{30}	—	March 11, 2011	Kitt Peak	Spacewatch	·	1.2 km	MPC · JPL
606387	2017 VB_{31}	—	October 15, 2001	Kitt Peak	Spacewatch	·	2.9 km	MPC · JPL
606388	2017 VN_{31}	—	December 15, 2007	Kitt Peak	Spacewatch	·	620 m	MPC · JPL
606389	2017 VE_{32}	—	September 27, 2006	Mount Lemmon	Mount Lemmon Survey	·	2.3 km	MPC · JPL
606390	2017 VH_{32}	—	September 18, 2009	Mount Lemmon	Mount Lemmon Survey	MAS	620 m	MPC · JPL
606391	2017 WM	—	November 11, 2007	Mount Lemmon	Mount Lemmon Survey	·	1.7 km	MPC · JPL
606392	2017 WO_{6}	—	March 11, 2002	Palomar	NEAT	·	840 m	MPC · JPL
606393	2017 WT_{6}	—	December 5, 2010	Mount Lemmon	Mount Lemmon Survey	·	1.3 km	MPC · JPL
606394	2017 WA_{7}	—	November 16, 2017	Mount Lemmon	Mount Lemmon Survey	·	1.2 km	MPC · JPL
606395	2017 WK_{9}	—	September 2, 2013	Mount Lemmon	Mount Lemmon Survey	·	1.2 km	MPC · JPL
606396	2017 WP_{9}	—	January 28, 2011	Mount Lemmon	Mount Lemmon Survey	·	1.2 km	MPC · JPL
606397	2017 WU_{10}	—	November 30, 2005	Mount Lemmon	Mount Lemmon Survey	EUN	1.1 km	MPC · JPL
606398	2017 WY_{10}	—	May 23, 2011	Nogales	M. Schwartz, P. R. Holvorcem	EUN	1.1 km	MPC · JPL
606399	2017 WE_{11}	—	September 30, 2003	Kitt Peak	Spacewatch	·	690 m	MPC · JPL
606400	2017 WS_{14}	—	January 17, 2013	Haleakala	Pan-STARRS 1	·	2.0 km	MPC · JPL

== 606401–606500 ==
back to top

Designation			Discovery			Properties		Ref
Permanent	Provisional	Named after	Date	Site	Discoverer(s)	Category	Diam.	Ref
606401	2017 WS_{20}	—	October 3, 2011	XuYi	PMO NEO Survey Program	·	2.9 km	MPC · JPL
606402	2017 WU_{22}	—	June 6, 2013	Kitt Peak	Spacewatch	·	860 m	MPC · JPL
606403	2017 WA_{25}	—	April 15, 2012	Haleakala	Pan-STARRS 1	PHO	810 m	MPC · JPL
606404	2017 WP_{44}	—	November 20, 2017	Haleakala	Pan-STARRS 1	·	1.1 km	MPC · JPL
606405	2017 WR_{44}	—	November 17, 2017	Haleakala	Pan-STARRS 1	·	750 m	MPC · JPL
606406	2017 XL_{4}	—	February 16, 2015	Haleakala	Pan-STARRS 1	·	740 m	MPC · JPL
606407	2017 XO_{5}	—	May 7, 2002	Palomar	NEAT	·	750 m	MPC · JPL
606408	2017 XB_{6}	—	October 30, 2007	Mount Lemmon	Mount Lemmon Survey	·	580 m	MPC · JPL
606409	2017 XS_{8}	—	November 27, 2010	Mount Lemmon	Mount Lemmon Survey	·	620 m	MPC · JPL
606410	2017 XQ_{9}	—	February 8, 2002	Kitt Peak	Deep Ecliptic Survey	·	2.5 km	MPC · JPL
606411	2017 XA_{10}	—	February 24, 2014	Haleakala	Pan-STARRS 1	·	1.5 km	MPC · JPL
606412	2017 XN_{15}	—	November 3, 2010	Kitt Peak	Spacewatch	·	650 m	MPC · JPL
606413	2017 XO_{16}	—	December 13, 2011	Oukaïmeden	C. Rinner	·	4.1 km	MPC · JPL
606414	2017 XN_{18}	—	September 6, 2004	Palomar	NEAT	·	1.4 km	MPC · JPL
606415	2017 XT_{19}	—	October 13, 2010	Mount Lemmon	Mount Lemmon Survey	·	730 m	MPC · JPL
606416	2017 XG_{22}	—	September 30, 1999	Kitt Peak	Spacewatch	NYS	730 m	MPC · JPL
606417	2017 XV_{24}	—	October 4, 1996	Kitt Peak	Spacewatch	·	1.2 km	MPC · JPL
606418	2017 XO_{26}	—	December 29, 2014	Haleakala	Pan-STARRS 1	·	430 m	MPC · JPL
606419	2017 XX_{28}	—	November 26, 2013	Mount Lemmon	Mount Lemmon Survey	(5)	990 m	MPC · JPL
606420	2017 XN_{32}	—	September 24, 2000	Socorro	LINEAR	·	660 m	MPC · JPL
606421	2017 XS_{32}	—	April 8, 2010	Kitt Peak	Spacewatch	MRX	840 m	MPC · JPL
606422	2017 XX_{34}	—	October 27, 2017	Mount Lemmon	Mount Lemmon Survey	·	630 m	MPC · JPL
606423	2017 XX_{38}	—	July 31, 2000	Cerro Tololo	Deep Ecliptic Survey	·	540 m	MPC · JPL
606424	2017 XF_{42}	—	April 25, 2008	Mount Lemmon	Mount Lemmon Survey	NYS	990 m	MPC · JPL
606425	2017 XR_{42}	—	June 8, 2016	Haleakala	Pan-STARRS 1	·	740 m	MPC · JPL
606426	2017 XB_{44}	—	March 1, 2008	Kitt Peak	Spacewatch	·	680 m	MPC · JPL
606427	2017 XF_{45}	—	July 28, 2005	Palomar	NEAT	MAS	730 m	MPC · JPL
606428	2017 XO_{47}	—	December 8, 2012	Mount Lemmon	Mount Lemmon Survey	·	1.2 km	MPC · JPL
606429	2017 XK_{48}	—	November 27, 2013	Haleakala	Pan-STARRS 1	·	750 m	MPC · JPL
606430	2017 XY_{49}	—	February 18, 2004	Kitt Peak	Spacewatch	NYS	770 m	MPC · JPL
606431	2017 XG_{55}	—	January 23, 2006	Mount Lemmon	Mount Lemmon Survey	·	3.3 km	MPC · JPL
606432	2017 XP_{55}	—	November 20, 2006	Kitt Peak	Spacewatch	·	680 m	MPC · JPL
606433	2017 XZ_{55}	—	November 26, 2013	Mount Lemmon	Mount Lemmon Survey	·	780 m	MPC · JPL
606434	2017 XL_{57}	—	January 25, 2006	Kitt Peak	Spacewatch	·	1.2 km	MPC · JPL
606435	2017 XR_{57}	—	April 23, 2015	Haleakala	Pan-STARRS 1	·	840 m	MPC · JPL
606436	2017 XS_{59}	—	June 14, 2012	Mount Lemmon	Mount Lemmon Survey	·	1.2 km	MPC · JPL
606437	2017 XV_{59}	—	February 28, 2008	Kitt Peak	Spacewatch	·	550 m	MPC · JPL
606438	2017 XK_{61}	—	December 13, 2017	Haleakala	Pan-STARRS 1	AMO · APO +1km	810 m	MPC · JPL
606439	2017 XP_{78}	—	March 4, 2006	Mount Lemmon	Mount Lemmon Survey	·	870 m	MPC · JPL
606440	2017 YL	—	March 25, 2007	Catalina	CSS	EUP	4.2 km	MPC · JPL
606441	2017 YT_{5}	—	December 23, 2017	Haleakala	Pan-STARRS 1	AMO · PHA	540 m	MPC · JPL
606442	2017 YH_{6}	—	June 7, 2016	Haleakala	Pan-STARRS 1	·	2.0 km	MPC · JPL
606443	2017 YW_{6}	—	July 27, 2011	Haleakala	Pan-STARRS 1	H	440 m	MPC · JPL
606444	2017 YW_{10}	—	December 7, 2013	Haleakala	Pan-STARRS 1	·	1.1 km	MPC · JPL
606445	2017 YG_{11}	—	August 4, 2013	Haleakala	Pan-STARRS 1	·	760 m	MPC · JPL
606446	2017 YQ_{11}	—	November 26, 2017	Mount Lemmon	Mount Lemmon Survey	·	1.3 km	MPC · JPL
606447	2017 YC_{12}	—	December 2, 2005	Kitt Peak	Spacewatch	PHO	1.1 km	MPC · JPL
606448	2017 YF_{12}	—	October 7, 2012	Haleakala	Pan-STARRS 1	·	1.2 km	MPC · JPL
606449	2017 YX_{12}	—	November 23, 2003	Kitt Peak	Spacewatch	·	1.8 km	MPC · JPL
606450	2017 YZ_{12}	—	October 25, 2013	Mount Lemmon	Mount Lemmon Survey	·	780 m	MPC · JPL
606451	2017 YB_{13}	—	November 20, 2000	Anderson Mesa	LONEOS	·	1.2 km	MPC · JPL
606452	2017 YW_{13}	—	May 18, 2015	Haleakala	Pan-STARRS 1	·	1.3 km	MPC · JPL
606453	2017 YS_{14}	—	October 10, 2006	Palomar	NEAT	·	2.4 km	MPC · JPL
606454	2017 YU_{22}	—	April 4, 2003	Kitt Peak	Spacewatch	·	1.7 km	MPC · JPL
606455	2017 YG_{23}	—	December 23, 2017	Haleakala	Pan-STARRS 1	·	1.3 km	MPC · JPL
606456	2017 YE_{24}	—	December 24, 2017	Haleakala	Pan-STARRS 1	EUN	920 m	MPC · JPL
606457	2017 YK_{28}	—	December 25, 2017	Haleakala	Pan-STARRS 1	TIN	850 m	MPC · JPL
606458	2017 YL_{40}	—	April 23, 2007	Mount Lemmon	Mount Lemmon Survey	TIR	2.3 km	MPC · JPL
606459	2018 AK_{6}	—	June 30, 2014	Kitt Peak	Spacewatch	·	2.2 km	MPC · JPL
606460	2018 AM_{7}	—	January 31, 2014	Haleakala	Pan-STARRS 1	EUN	900 m	MPC · JPL
606461	2018 AT_{7}	—	January 23, 2014	Mount Lemmon	Mount Lemmon Survey	MAR	1 km	MPC · JPL
606462	2018 AS_{8}	—	November 17, 2010	Mount Lemmon	Mount Lemmon Survey	PHO	980 m	MPC · JPL
606463	2018 AA_{9}	—	January 22, 2015	Haleakala	Pan-STARRS 1	·	990 m	MPC · JPL
606464	2018 AV_{9}	—	October 7, 2013	Mount Lemmon	Mount Lemmon Survey	V	520 m	MPC · JPL
606465	2018 AD_{10}	—	June 10, 2005	Kitt Peak	Spacewatch	V	520 m	MPC · JPL
606466	2018 AA_{11}	—	September 16, 2009	Catalina	CSS	·	1.5 km	MPC · JPL
606467	2018 AE_{11}	—	February 8, 2011	Mount Lemmon	Mount Lemmon Survey	·	730 m	MPC · JPL
606468	2018 AC_{14}	—	March 11, 2008	XuYi	PMO NEO Survey Program	(2076)	890 m	MPC · JPL
606469	2018 AJ_{14}	—	December 24, 2017	Haleakala	Pan-STARRS 1	LIX	2.3 km	MPC · JPL
606470	2018 AV_{14}	—	February 22, 2001	Kitt Peak	Spacewatch	·	660 m	MPC · JPL
606471	2018 AY_{14}	—	October 13, 2005	Kitt Peak	Spacewatch	·	2.4 km	MPC · JPL
606472	2018 AB_{15}	—	January 23, 2015	Haleakala	Pan-STARRS 1	·	580 m	MPC · JPL
606473	2018 AU_{15}	—	October 6, 2008	Mount Lemmon	Mount Lemmon Survey	·	1.2 km	MPC · JPL
606474	2018 AF_{17}	—	August 27, 2016	Haleakala	Pan-STARRS 1	KOR	1.1 km	MPC · JPL
606475	2018 AG_{17}	—	September 25, 2008	Kitt Peak	Spacewatch	·	930 m	MPC · JPL
606476	2018 AM_{17}	—	January 13, 2005	Kitt Peak	Spacewatch	·	970 m	MPC · JPL
606477	2018 AJ_{18}	—	February 24, 2014	Haleakala	Pan-STARRS 1	HNS	1.1 km	MPC · JPL
606478	2018 AQ_{22}	—	January 27, 2007	Mount Lemmon	Mount Lemmon Survey	LIX	2.7 km	MPC · JPL
606479	2018 AT_{23}	—	February 21, 2014	Kitt Peak	Spacewatch	HNS	820 m	MPC · JPL
606480	2018 AK_{26}	—	January 14, 2018	Haleakala	Pan-STARRS 1	·	1.5 km	MPC · JPL
606481	2018 AS_{26}	—	January 12, 2018	Haleakala	Pan-STARRS 1	·	1.5 km	MPC · JPL
606482	2018 AR_{28}	—	January 14, 2018	Haleakala	Pan-STARRS 1	·	1.4 km	MPC · JPL
606483	2018 AT_{28}	—	January 14, 2018	Haleakala	Pan-STARRS 1	VER	2.0 km	MPC · JPL
606484	2018 AW_{28}	—	January 14, 2018	Haleakala	Pan-STARRS 1	·	2.2 km	MPC · JPL
606485	2018 AF_{30}	—	January 15, 2018	Haleakala	Pan-STARRS 1	·	2.3 km	MPC · JPL
606486	2018 AF_{32}	—	January 15, 2018	Haleakala	Pan-STARRS 1	·	1.2 km	MPC · JPL
606487	2018 BO	—	March 30, 2015	Haleakala	Pan-STARRS 1	·	1 km	MPC · JPL
606488	2018 BG_{2}	—	February 10, 2014	Mount Lemmon	Mount Lemmon Survey	KON	2.1 km	MPC · JPL
606489	2018 BT_{2}	—	October 7, 2012	Haleakala	Pan-STARRS 1	EUN	1.3 km	MPC · JPL
606490	2018 BV_{2}	—	October 25, 2012	Mount Lemmon	Mount Lemmon Survey	·	2.5 km	MPC · JPL
606491	2018 BU_{5}	—	July 4, 2016	Haleakala	Pan-STARRS 1	·	1.3 km	MPC · JPL
606492	2018 BG_{7}	—	March 6, 2013	Haleakala	Pan-STARRS 1	H	410 m	MPC · JPL
606493	2018 BD_{8}	—	November 22, 2006	Mount Lemmon	Mount Lemmon Survey	·	1.2 km	MPC · JPL
606494	2018 BQ_{8}	—	September 23, 2005	Catalina	CSS	·	2.4 km	MPC · JPL
606495	2018 BE_{9}	—	January 28, 2014	Catalina	CSS	·	1.4 km	MPC · JPL
606496	2018 BH_{13}	—	January 20, 2018	Haleakala	Pan-STARRS 1	·	2.7 km	MPC · JPL
606497	2018 BC_{18}	—	January 16, 2018	Haleakala	Pan-STARRS 1	PAD	1.2 km	MPC · JPL
606498	2018 BQ_{18}	—	January 16, 2018	Haleakala	Pan-STARRS 1	·	2.0 km	MPC · JPL
606499	2018 BB_{19}	—	January 23, 2018	Mount Lemmon	Mount Lemmon Survey	·	1.9 km	MPC · JPL
606500	2018 BK_{20}	—	January 20, 2018	Haleakala	Pan-STARRS 1	·	2.2 km	MPC · JPL

== 606501–606600 ==
back to top

Designation			Discovery			Properties		Ref
Permanent	Provisional	Named after	Date	Site	Discoverer(s)	Category	Diam.	Ref
606501	2018 BY_{20}	—	January 16, 2018	Calar Alto-CASADO	Mottola, S., Hellmich, S.	·	2.5 km	MPC · JPL
606502	2018 BD_{22}	—	January 16, 2018	Haleakala	Pan-STARRS 1	·	1.1 km	MPC · JPL
606503	2018 BX_{22}	—	January 16, 2018	Haleakala	Pan-STARRS 1	·	1.3 km	MPC · JPL
606504	2018 CJ_{4}	—	January 17, 2004	Palomar	NEAT	DOR	2.5 km	MPC · JPL
606505	2018 CN_{4}	—	September 7, 2008	Mount Lemmon	Mount Lemmon Survey	·	960 m	MPC · JPL
606506	2018 CL_{5}	—	January 29, 2014	Kitt Peak	Spacewatch	·	1.4 km	MPC · JPL
606507	2018 CR_{5}	—	March 31, 2003	Palomar	NEAT	PHO	1.4 km	MPC · JPL
606508	2018 CN_{6}	—	August 24, 2012	Kitt Peak	Spacewatch	·	1.3 km	MPC · JPL
606509	2018 CZ_{6}	—	August 7, 2016	Haleakala	Pan-STARRS 1	·	1.3 km	MPC · JPL
606510	2018 CF_{7}	—	January 21, 1996	Kitt Peak	Spacewatch	·	1.4 km	MPC · JPL
606511	2018 CP_{7}	—	January 3, 2001	Socorro	LINEAR	·	1.3 km	MPC · JPL
606512	2018 CQ_{7}	—	February 1, 2005	Catalina	CSS	·	2.1 km	MPC · JPL
606513	2018 CS_{7}	—	August 26, 2012	Catalina	CSS	(5)	1.4 km	MPC · JPL
606514	2018 CX_{7}	—	February 4, 2009	Mount Lemmon	Mount Lemmon Survey	·	2.4 km	MPC · JPL
606515	2018 CA_{8}	—	February 17, 2002	Palomar	NEAT	·	2.6 km	MPC · JPL
606516	2018 CP_{8}	—	June 22, 2007	Kitt Peak	Spacewatch	HNS	1.3 km	MPC · JPL
606517	2018 CT_{8}	—	October 27, 2008	Mount Lemmon	Mount Lemmon Survey	·	1.5 km	MPC · JPL
606518	2018 CD_{9}	—	December 2, 2008	Kitt Peak	Spacewatch	EUN	1.5 km	MPC · JPL
606519	2018 CH_{9}	—	March 10, 2007	Kitt Peak	Spacewatch	·	1.2 km	MPC · JPL
606520	2018 CL_{9}	—	February 4, 2009	Mount Lemmon	Mount Lemmon Survey	·	1.9 km	MPC · JPL
606521	2018 CC_{10}	—	October 19, 2003	Apache Point	SDSS	JUN	1.1 km	MPC · JPL
606522	2018 CO_{10}	—	April 13, 2013	Kitt Peak	Spacewatch	·	2.9 km	MPC · JPL
606523	2018 CP_{10}	—	March 8, 2005	Catalina	CSS	·	2.0 km	MPC · JPL
606524	2018 CR_{10}	—	November 2, 2008	Catalina	CSS	·	1.7 km	MPC · JPL
606525	2018 CY_{10}	—	February 19, 2007	Catalina	CSS	T_{j} (2.98)	2.9 km	MPC · JPL
606526	2018 CB_{11}	—	February 13, 2011	Mount Lemmon	Mount Lemmon Survey	·	830 m	MPC · JPL
606527	2018 CF_{11}	—	January 8, 2010	Mount Lemmon	Mount Lemmon Survey	·	1.3 km	MPC · JPL
606528	2018 CJ_{11}	—	November 3, 2005	Catalina	CSS	·	1.2 km	MPC · JPL
606529	2018 CV_{11}	—	April 7, 2005	Kitt Peak	Spacewatch	·	2.2 km	MPC · JPL
606530	2018 CL_{12}	—	April 1, 2015	Haleakala	Pan-STARRS 1	PHO	1.1 km	MPC · JPL
606531	2018 CU_{12}	—	March 21, 2009	Kitt Peak	Spacewatch	KOR	1.4 km	MPC · JPL
606532	2018 CE_{13}	—	September 27, 2008	Mount Lemmon	Mount Lemmon Survey	·	820 m	MPC · JPL
606533	2018 CF_{13}	—	April 5, 2005	Mount Lemmon	Mount Lemmon Survey	·	1.6 km	MPC · JPL
606534	2018 CN_{15}	—	February 6, 2007	Palomar	NEAT	·	1.1 km	MPC · JPL
606535	2018 CX_{15}	—	March 18, 2001	Haleakala	NEAT	BAR	1.2 km	MPC · JPL
606536	2018 CH_{16}	—	December 14, 2013	Haleakala	Pan-STARRS 1	·	1.4 km	MPC · JPL
606537	2018 CK_{16}	—	September 17, 2006	Catalina	CSS	H	510 m	MPC · JPL
606538	2018 CH_{18}	—	February 12, 2018	Haleakala	Pan-STARRS 1	·	2.1 km	MPC · JPL
606539	2018 CA_{21}	—	February 12, 2018	Haleakala	Pan-STARRS 1	·	2.3 km	MPC · JPL
606540	2018 CB_{21}	—	September 19, 2011	Haleakala	Pan-STARRS 1	·	1.6 km	MPC · JPL
606541	2018 CS_{22}	—	January 27, 2007	Kitt Peak	Spacewatch	·	2.0 km	MPC · JPL
606542	2018 DR_{3}	—	December 16, 2004	Catalina	CSS	H	520 m	MPC · JPL
606543	2018 DA_{6}	—	January 25, 2007	Kitt Peak	Spacewatch	·	2.0 km	MPC · JPL
606544	2018 EE_{3}	—	March 16, 2013	Kitt Peak	Spacewatch	·	1.9 km	MPC · JPL
606545	2018 EH_{3}	—	March 27, 2011	Mount Lemmon	Mount Lemmon Survey	·	960 m	MPC · JPL
606546	2018 EJ_{3}	—	December 21, 2012	Mount Lemmon	Mount Lemmon Survey	·	1.5 km	MPC · JPL
606547	2018 EW_{4}	—	March 15, 2013	Mount Lemmon	Mount Lemmon Survey	·	2.4 km	MPC · JPL
606548	2018 EY_{4}	—	June 30, 2014	Haleakala	Pan-STARRS 1	T_{j} (2.94)	3.6 km	MPC · JPL
606549	2018 EH_{5}	—	May 5, 2003	Kitt Peak	Spacewatch	·	1.3 km	MPC · JPL
606550	2018 EM_{5}	—	February 15, 2010	Catalina	CSS	MAR	1.2 km	MPC · JPL
606551	2018 EN_{5}	—	February 19, 2007	Catalina	CSS	PHO	760 m	MPC · JPL
606552	2018 EA_{6}	—	April 11, 2013	Siding Spring	SSS	H	540 m	MPC · JPL
606553	2018 EB_{7}	—	October 16, 2012	Mount Lemmon	Mount Lemmon Survey	(116763)	1.4 km	MPC · JPL
606554	2018 EV_{9}	—	January 10, 2013	Haleakala	Pan-STARRS 1	·	2.2 km	MPC · JPL
606555	2018 FW_{6}	—	February 21, 2009	Kitt Peak	Spacewatch	·	1.5 km	MPC · JPL
606556	2018 FG_{10}	—	March 11, 2007	Kitt Peak	Spacewatch	·	2.3 km	MPC · JPL
606557	2018 FO_{10}	—	April 14, 2007	Kitt Peak	Spacewatch	·	1.1 km	MPC · JPL
606558	2018 FX_{10}	—	October 18, 1998	Kitt Peak	Spacewatch	·	620 m	MPC · JPL
606559	2018 FW_{11}	—	October 2, 2006	Mount Lemmon	Mount Lemmon Survey	·	550 m	MPC · JPL
606560	2018 FP_{13}	—	October 15, 2012	Mount Lemmon	Mount Lemmon Survey	·	1.0 km	MPC · JPL
606561	2018 FY_{13}	—	February 21, 2007	Kitt Peak	Spacewatch	·	2.1 km	MPC · JPL
606562	2018 FQ_{14}	—	August 27, 2006	Kitt Peak	Spacewatch	·	570 m	MPC · JPL
606563	2018 FC_{15}	—	October 22, 2011	Mount Lemmon	Mount Lemmon Survey	·	1.2 km	MPC · JPL
606564	2018 FF_{15}	—	December 23, 2016	Haleakala	Pan-STARRS 1	·	2.5 km	MPC · JPL
606565	2018 FN_{15}	—	April 27, 2008	Kitt Peak	Spacewatch	V	470 m	MPC · JPL
606566	2018 FU_{15}	—	May 5, 2008	Mount Lemmon	Mount Lemmon Survey	·	630 m	MPC · JPL
606567	2018 FG_{16}	—	January 10, 2007	Kitt Peak	Spacewatch	·	710 m	MPC · JPL
606568	2018 FA_{17}	—	January 2, 2013	Mount Lemmon	Mount Lemmon Survey	·	1.4 km	MPC · JPL
606569	2018 FC_{17}	—	November 10, 2009	Kitt Peak	Spacewatch	V	530 m	MPC · JPL
606570	2018 FT_{18}	—	February 20, 2009	Mount Lemmon	Mount Lemmon Survey	HNS	860 m	MPC · JPL
606571	2018 FZ_{19}	—	February 1, 2012	Kitt Peak	Spacewatch	·	2.3 km	MPC · JPL
606572	2018 FH_{22}	—	February 10, 2014	Haleakala	Pan-STARRS 1	·	1.0 km	MPC · JPL
606573	2018 FL_{23}	—	March 17, 2018	Haleakala	Pan-STARRS 1	3:2 · SHU	3.7 km	MPC · JPL
606574	2018 FR_{24}	—	February 21, 2007	Kitt Peak	Spacewatch	MAS	530 m	MPC · JPL
606575	2018 FY_{25}	—	February 28, 2009	Kitt Peak	Spacewatch	·	1.5 km	MPC · JPL
606576	2018 FW_{26}	—	September 9, 2007	Mount Lemmon	Mount Lemmon Survey	EUN	1.0 km	MPC · JPL
606577	2018 FJ_{27}	—	March 16, 2005	Mount Lemmon	Mount Lemmon Survey	·	510 m	MPC · JPL
606578	2018 FT_{28}	—	September 13, 2007	Mount Lemmon	Mount Lemmon Survey	·	1.5 km	MPC · JPL
606579	2018 FD_{29}	—	February 9, 2014	Kitt Peak	Spacewatch	·	1.1 km	MPC · JPL
606580	2018 FO_{29}	—	April 10, 2010	Mount Lemmon	Mount Lemmon Survey	·	1.3 km	MPC · JPL
606581	2018 FC_{39}	—	March 18, 2018	Haleakala	Pan-STARRS 1	·	1.5 km	MPC · JPL
606582	2018 GP_{6}	—	April 23, 2013	Mount Lemmon	Mount Lemmon Survey	·	2.4 km	MPC · JPL
606583	2018 GE_{7}	—	January 29, 2012	Catalina	CSS	EUP	4.0 km	MPC · JPL
606584	2018 GF_{7}	—	April 23, 2007	Mount Lemmon	Mount Lemmon Survey	THB	1.7 km	MPC · JPL
606585	2018 GR_{7}	—	June 4, 2002	Palomar	NEAT	·	2.7 km	MPC · JPL
606586	2018 GT_{7}	—	May 9, 2007	Kitt Peak	Spacewatch	·	4.7 km	MPC · JPL
606587	2018 GY_{7}	—	October 18, 2007	Kitt Peak	Spacewatch	·	1.5 km	MPC · JPL
606588	2018 GH_{8}	—	October 28, 2005	Kitt Peak	Spacewatch	·	1.8 km	MPC · JPL
606589	2018 GT_{8}	—	April 1, 2014	Mount Lemmon	Mount Lemmon Survey	·	1.3 km	MPC · JPL
606590	2018 GJ_{9}	—	January 24, 2014	Haleakala	Pan-STARRS 1	NYS	950 m	MPC · JPL
606591	2018 GC_{11}	—	April 15, 2007	Kitt Peak	Spacewatch	VER	2.9 km	MPC · JPL
606592	2018 GL_{11}	—	September 16, 2004	Kitt Peak	Spacewatch	·	1.1 km	MPC · JPL
606593	2018 GO_{11}	—	May 4, 2005	Mount Lemmon	Mount Lemmon Survey	·	650 m	MPC · JPL
606594	2018 GP_{11}	—	July 19, 2015	Haleakala	Pan-STARRS 1	·	1.6 km	MPC · JPL
606595	2018 GW_{11}	—	June 25, 2015	Haleakala	Pan-STARRS 1	NYS	760 m	MPC · JPL
606596	2018 HH_{1}	—	September 12, 2007	Mount Lemmon	Mount Lemmon Survey	·	1.6 km	MPC · JPL
606597	2018 HA_{3}	—	April 10, 2013	Haleakala	Pan-STARRS 1	KOR	1.2 km	MPC · JPL
606598	2018 HS_{4}	—	July 28, 2011	Haleakala	Pan-STARRS 1	(5)	890 m	MPC · JPL
606599	2018 HC_{5}	—	January 16, 2017	Haleakala	Pan-STARRS 1	·	650 m	MPC · JPL
606600	2018 JW_{2}	—	April 14, 2005	Catalina	CSS	H	550 m	MPC · JPL

== 606601–606700 ==
back to top

Designation			Discovery			Properties		Ref
Permanent	Provisional	Named after	Date	Site	Discoverer(s)	Category	Diam.	Ref
606601	2018 JX_{2}	—	February 12, 2015	Haleakala	Pan-STARRS 1	H	530 m	MPC · JPL
606602	2018 JA_{5}	—	April 15, 2010	Mount Lemmon	Mount Lemmon Survey	MAR	1.2 km	MPC · JPL
606603	2018 JS_{5}	—	March 30, 2012	Kitt Peak	Spacewatch	·	2.7 km	MPC · JPL
606604	2018 KG	—	March 15, 2010	Catalina	CSS	·	650 m	MPC · JPL
606605	2018 KV	—	April 13, 2018	Haleakala	Pan-STARRS 1	T_{j} (2.9) · APO +1km	1.2 km	MPC · JPL
606606	2018 KP_{3}	—	September 18, 2014	Haleakala	Pan-STARRS 1	·	3.9 km	MPC · JPL
606607	2018 KR_{3}	—	April 20, 2009	Catalina	CSS	JUN	1.1 km	MPC · JPL
606608	2018 LZ_{3}	—	June 1, 2013	Haleakala	Pan-STARRS 1	·	2.9 km	MPC · JPL
606609	2018 LN_{7}	—	June 10, 2007	Kitt Peak	Spacewatch	·	2.6 km	MPC · JPL
606610	2018 LU_{7}	—	March 13, 2013	Catalina	CSS	·	1.7 km	MPC · JPL
606611	2018 LP_{8}	—	September 14, 1996	Kitt Peak	Spacewatch	·	1.2 km	MPC · JPL
606612	2018 LV_{8}	—	June 20, 2010	ESA OGS	ESA OGS	·	2.0 km	MPC · JPL
606613	2018 LL_{9}	—	April 6, 2014	Mount Lemmon	Mount Lemmon Survey	PHO	840 m	MPC · JPL
606614	2018 LK_{10}	—	August 17, 2002	Palomar	NEAT	·	2.5 km	MPC · JPL
606615	2018 LA_{11}	—	September 25, 2014	Mount Lemmon	Mount Lemmon Survey	·	2.5 km	MPC · JPL
606616	2018 LV_{11}	—	April 10, 2013	Haleakala	Pan-STARRS 1	·	1.6 km	MPC · JPL
606617	2018 LV_{12}	—	August 27, 2014	Haleakala	Pan-STARRS 1	·	2.0 km	MPC · JPL
606618	2018 LX_{12}	—	January 28, 2007	Mount Lemmon	Mount Lemmon Survey	·	2.4 km	MPC · JPL
606619	2018 LK_{13}	—	December 3, 2010	Mount Lemmon	Mount Lemmon Survey	·	1.7 km	MPC · JPL
606620	2018 LB_{14}	—	October 1, 2014	Haleakala	Pan-STARRS 1	EOS	1.6 km	MPC · JPL
606621	2018 LT_{22}	—	April 18, 2015	Cerro Tololo	DECam	L4	6.4 km	MPC · JPL
606622	2018 LN_{30}	—	June 15, 2018	Haleakala	Pan-STARRS 1	·	890 m	MPC · JPL
606623	2018 MN	—	September 20, 2014	Haleakala	Pan-STARRS 1	·	1.7 km	MPC · JPL
606624	2018 ML_{1}	—	February 25, 2007	Kitt Peak	Spacewatch	·	1.3 km	MPC · JPL
606625	2018 MN_{3}	—	April 8, 2008	Mount Lemmon	Mount Lemmon Survey	(13314)	1.7 km	MPC · JPL
606626	2018 MH_{4}	—	May 8, 2014	Haleakala	Pan-STARRS 1	·	1.3 km	MPC · JPL
606627	2018 MA_{6}	—	September 15, 2007	Catalina	CSS	·	4.5 km	MPC · JPL
606628	2018 MF_{6}	—	December 26, 2006	Kitt Peak	Spacewatch	·	1.8 km	MPC · JPL
606629	2018 MD_{8}	—	November 17, 2014	Haleakala	Pan-STARRS 1	·	2.8 km	MPC · JPL
606630	2018 MA_{18}	—	June 16, 2018	Haleakala	Pan-STARRS 1	L4	6.4 km	MPC · JPL
606631	2018 NT	—	June 18, 2014	Haleakala	Pan-STARRS 1	BAR	970 m	MPC · JPL
606632	2018 NP_{4}	—	October 22, 2013	Mount Lemmon	Mount Lemmon Survey	H	680 m	MPC · JPL
606633	2018 NG_{5}	—	April 19, 2013	Haleakala	Pan-STARRS 1	·	1.3 km	MPC · JPL
606634	2018 NJ_{5}	—	November 11, 2004	Kitt Peak	Deep Ecliptic Survey	T_{j} (2.99)	3.3 km	MPC · JPL
606635	2018 NM_{5}	—	September 26, 2008	Kitt Peak	Spacewatch	·	2.2 km	MPC · JPL
606636	2018 NZ_{5}	—	May 6, 2008	Mount Lemmon	Mount Lemmon Survey	·	550 m	MPC · JPL
606637	2018 NV_{7}	—	April 27, 2012	Haleakala	Pan-STARRS 1	EOS	1.7 km	MPC · JPL
606638	2018 NT_{11}	—	November 18, 2008	Kitt Peak	Spacewatch	·	3.1 km	MPC · JPL
606639	2018 NK_{15}	—	January 15, 2008	Mount Lemmon	Mount Lemmon Survey	HNS	970 m	MPC · JPL
606640	2018 NA_{30}	—	May 8, 2014	Haleakala	Pan-STARRS 1	·	630 m	MPC · JPL
606641	2018 NA_{36}	—	March 28, 2016	Cerro Tololo	DECam	·	2.5 km	MPC · JPL
606642	2018 NU_{37}	—	July 10, 2018	Haleakala	Pan-STARRS 1	L4	6.5 km	MPC · JPL
606643	2018 OC_{2}	—	September 11, 2007	Mount Lemmon	Mount Lemmon Survey	HYG	3.4 km	MPC · JPL
606644	2018 PV	—	October 8, 2002	Palomar	NEAT	·	2.1 km	MPC · JPL
606645	2018 PB_{11}	—	September 14, 2013	Haleakala	Pan-STARRS 1	·	2.8 km	MPC · JPL
606646	2018 PK_{16}	—	December 29, 2014	Haleakala	Pan-STARRS 1	VER	2.2 km	MPC · JPL
606647	2018 PQ_{16}	—	November 16, 2010	Mount Lemmon	Mount Lemmon Survey	·	2.1 km	MPC · JPL
606648	2018 PH_{20}	—	January 2, 2017	Haleakala	Pan-STARRS 1	BAR	1.0 km	MPC · JPL
606649	2018 PF_{26}	—	December 13, 2013	Mount Lemmon	Mount Lemmon Survey	EUP	3.0 km	MPC · JPL
606650	2018 PP_{41}	—	December 29, 2014	Mount Lemmon	Mount Lemmon Survey	VER	2.0 km	MPC · JPL
606651	2018 PG_{55}	—	December 23, 2012	Haleakala	Pan-STARRS 1	·	820 m	MPC · JPL
606652	2018 PC_{63}	—	January 20, 2015	Mount Lemmon	Mount Lemmon Survey	·	2.6 km	MPC · JPL
606653	2018 RR_{2}	—	August 18, 2018	Haleakala	Pan-STARRS 1	T_{j} (2.62) · centaur	20 km	MPC · JPL
606654	2018 RH_{10}	—	October 31, 2010	Kitt Peak	Spacewatch	·	770 m	MPC · JPL
606655	2018 RX_{10}	—	January 2, 2009	Kitt Peak	Spacewatch	·	2.6 km	MPC · JPL
606656	2018 RD_{11}	—	October 9, 2007	Kitt Peak	Spacewatch	ELF	3.5 km	MPC · JPL
606657	2018 RX_{11}	—	November 19, 2007	Mount Lemmon	Mount Lemmon Survey	·	3.0 km	MPC · JPL
606658	2018 RO_{12}	—	November 1, 2013	Mount Lemmon	Mount Lemmon Survey	·	2.9 km	MPC · JPL
606659	2018 RA_{13}	—	October 24, 2015	Haleakala	Pan-STARRS 1	·	570 m	MPC · JPL
606660	2018 RA_{14}	—	November 30, 2011	Mount Lemmon	Mount Lemmon Survey	PHO	760 m	MPC · JPL
606661	2018 RB_{14}	—	October 8, 2007	Mount Lemmon	Mount Lemmon Survey	·	2.0 km	MPC · JPL
606662	2018 RO_{14}	—	September 6, 2013	Mount Lemmon	Mount Lemmon Survey	·	2.0 km	MPC · JPL
606663	2018 RA_{16}	—	October 19, 2010	Mount Lemmon	Mount Lemmon Survey	KON	1.4 km	MPC · JPL
606664	2018 RY_{16}	—	October 31, 2005	Kitt Peak	Spacewatch	·	1.4 km	MPC · JPL
606665	2018 RY_{19}	—	September 10, 2007	Kitt Peak	Spacewatch	VER	2.5 km	MPC · JPL
606666	2018 RM_{21}	—	October 10, 2010	Mount Lemmon	Mount Lemmon Survey	·	1.1 km	MPC · JPL
606667	2018 RG_{24}	—	November 19, 2008	Mount Lemmon	Mount Lemmon Survey	(2076)	840 m	MPC · JPL
606668	2018 RA_{26}	—	July 3, 2008	Siding Spring	SSS	·	610 m	MPC · JPL
606669	2018 RY_{27}	—	August 21, 2012	Haleakala	Pan-STARRS 1	EUP	2.8 km	MPC · JPL
606670	2018 RK_{28}	—	February 8, 2013	Haleakala	Pan-STARRS 1	V	660 m	MPC · JPL
606671	2018 RM_{28}	—	September 20, 2011	Haleakala	Pan-STARRS 1	PHO	950 m	MPC · JPL
606672	2018 RO_{29}	—	September 10, 2004	Socorro	LINEAR	·	560 m	MPC · JPL
606673	2018 RR_{29}	—	July 12, 2013	Haleakala	Pan-STARRS 1	DOR	1.9 km	MPC · JPL
606674	2018 RH_{32}	—	March 5, 2016	Haleakala	Pan-STARRS 1	BAR	1.0 km	MPC · JPL
606675	2018 RM_{32}	—	October 10, 2007	Mount Lemmon	Mount Lemmon Survey	·	3.0 km	MPC · JPL
606676	2018 RS_{32}	—	August 19, 2003	Campo Imperatore	CINEOS	·	1.8 km	MPC · JPL
606677	2018 RT_{32}	—	December 24, 2014	Mount Lemmon	Mount Lemmon Survey	·	3.4 km	MPC · JPL
606678	2018 RX_{33}	—	October 8, 2007	Catalina	CSS	·	3.3 km	MPC · JPL
606679	2018 RP_{34}	—	October 1, 2005	Anderson Mesa	LONEOS	·	4.9 km	MPC · JPL
606680	2018 RR_{34}	—	October 29, 2005	Catalina	CSS	JUN	1.0 km	MPC · JPL
606681	2018 RQ_{35}	—	November 5, 2010	Mount Lemmon	Mount Lemmon Survey	·	1.1 km	MPC · JPL
606682	2018 RF_{36}	—	April 17, 2013	Haleakala	Pan-STARRS 1	·	1.2 km	MPC · JPL
606683	2018 RO_{36}	—	September 27, 2009	Mount Lemmon	Mount Lemmon Survey	·	1.7 km	MPC · JPL
606684	2018 RT_{36}	—	March 16, 2010	Mount Lemmon	Mount Lemmon Survey	V	660 m	MPC · JPL
606685	2018 RW_{36}	—	September 29, 2005	Catalina	CSS	·	1.4 km	MPC · JPL
606686	2018 RQ_{50}	—	September 8, 2018	Mount Lemmon	Mount Lemmon Survey	H	420 m	MPC · JPL
606687	2018 SU_{1}	—	October 26, 2013	Kitt Peak	Spacewatch	H	440 m	MPC · JPL
606688	2018 SD_{4}	—	August 22, 2007	Anderson Mesa	LONEOS	·	2.4 km	MPC · JPL
606689	2018 SP_{5}	—	August 6, 2005	Palomar	NEAT	·	610 m	MPC · JPL
606690	2018 SE_{6}	—	September 29, 2008	Catalina	CSS	·	640 m	MPC · JPL
606691	2018 SN_{6}	—	November 30, 2008	Kitt Peak	Spacewatch	V	590 m	MPC · JPL
606692	2018 SG_{7}	—	August 16, 2004	Siding Spring	SSS	·	750 m	MPC · JPL
606693	2018 SQ_{8}	—	October 3, 2006	Mount Lemmon	Mount Lemmon Survey	·	1.1 km	MPC · JPL
606694	2018 SC_{9}	—	September 12, 1997	Xinglong	SCAP	·	1.1 km	MPC · JPL
606695	2018 SE_{9}	—	August 11, 2012	Siding Spring	SSS	THB	2.3 km	MPC · JPL
606696	2018 SU_{9}	—	August 24, 2012	Ka-Dar	Gerke, V.	EUP	2.5 km	MPC · JPL
606697	2018 SF_{12}	—	April 6, 2011	Mount Lemmon	Mount Lemmon Survey	·	2.0 km	MPC · JPL
606698	2018 SS_{12}	—	October 18, 2011	Mount Lemmon	Mount Lemmon Survey	MAS	660 m	MPC · JPL
606699	2018 SU_{12}	—	September 13, 2007	Mount Lemmon	Mount Lemmon Survey	H	440 m	MPC · JPL
606700	2018 SQ_{14}	—	December 17, 2006	Catalina	CSS	·	2.2 km	MPC · JPL

== 606701–606800 ==
back to top

Designation			Discovery			Properties		Ref
Permanent	Provisional	Named after	Date	Site	Discoverer(s)	Category	Diam.	Ref
606701 Golda	2018 SA_{16}	Golda	August 31, 2013	Tincana	M. Kusiak, M. Żołnowski	·	1.7 km	MPC · JPL
606702	2018 TO_{2}	—	October 4, 2018	Haleakala	Pan-STARRS 2	APO	340 m	MPC · JPL
606703	2018 TY_{3}	—	August 22, 2012	Črni Vrh	Mikuž, H.	T_{j} (2.99)	2.8 km	MPC · JPL
606704	2018 TF_{11}	—	December 8, 2005	Kitt Peak	Spacewatch	·	1.4 km	MPC · JPL
606705	2018 TE_{14}	—	March 26, 2006	Kitt Peak	Spacewatch	·	2.7 km	MPC · JPL
606706	2018 TS_{14}	—	September 25, 2008	Kitt Peak	Spacewatch	·	620 m	MPC · JPL
606707	2018 TB_{15}	—	July 5, 2000	Kitt Peak	Spacewatch	THM	2.6 km	MPC · JPL
606708	2018 UT_{3}	—	February 3, 2012	Haleakala	Pan-STARRS 1	EUN	1.0 km	MPC · JPL
606709	2018 UW_{3}	—	March 20, 2012	Haleakala	Pan-STARRS 1	MAR	1.0 km	MPC · JPL
606710	2018 UO_{6}	—	October 25, 2001	Apache Point	SDSS Collaboration	·	650 m	MPC · JPL
606711	2018 UR_{6}	—	October 26, 2011	Haleakala	Pan-STARRS 1	NYS	720 m	MPC · JPL
606712	2018 UT_{8}	—	October 10, 2001	Kitt Peak	Spacewatch	·	3.1 km	MPC · JPL
606713	2018 UM_{11}	—	March 19, 2017	Haleakala	Pan-STARRS 1	·	920 m	MPC · JPL
606714	2018 UH_{14}	—	September 18, 2009	Kitt Peak	Spacewatch	ADE	1.8 km	MPC · JPL
606715	2018 UQ_{15}	—	April 27, 2012	Haleakala	Pan-STARRS 1	·	990 m	MPC · JPL
606716	2018 UR_{15}	—	February 6, 2011	Catalina	CSS	·	1.2 km	MPC · JPL
606717	2018 UN_{18}	—	February 9, 2007	Catalina	CSS	·	1.7 km	MPC · JPL
606718	2018 VC_{8}	—	September 1, 2005	Palomar	NEAT	H	480 m	MPC · JPL
606719	2018 VW_{10}	—	December 27, 2013	Oukaïmeden	C. Rinner	·	1.9 km	MPC · JPL
606720	2018 VL_{18}	—	November 6, 2013	Haleakala	Pan-STARRS 1	·	2.2 km	MPC · JPL
606721	2018 VY_{18}	—	October 31, 2014	Haleakala	Pan-STARRS 1	·	1.4 km	MPC · JPL
606722	2018 VV_{21}	—	September 21, 2011	Kitt Peak	Spacewatch	·	610 m	MPC · JPL
606723	2018 VM_{23}	—	October 10, 2004	Socorro	LINEAR	·	1.4 km	MPC · JPL
606724	2018 VX_{23}	—	March 27, 2009	Kitt Peak	Spacewatch	H	400 m	MPC · JPL
606725	2018 VX_{24}	—	August 24, 2012	Kitt Peak	Spacewatch	EUP	2.8 km	MPC · JPL
606726	2018 VS_{26}	—	November 13, 2007	Mount Lemmon	Mount Lemmon Survey	·	2.3 km	MPC · JPL
606727	2018 VE_{30}	—	April 7, 2003	Kitt Peak	Spacewatch	·	3.2 km	MPC · JPL
606728	2018 VX_{31}	—	August 18, 2014	Haleakala	Pan-STARRS 1	·	890 m	MPC · JPL
606729	2018 VU_{35}	—	May 7, 2016	Haleakala	Pan-STARRS 1	·	1.2 km	MPC · JPL
606730	2018 VV_{36}	—	January 21, 2015	Haleakala	Pan-STARRS 1	·	1.9 km	MPC · JPL
606731	2018 VX_{36}	—	November 20, 2009	Kitt Peak	Spacewatch	(18466)	1.8 km	MPC · JPL
606732	2018 VW_{39}	—	September 13, 2004	Goodricke-Pigott	R. A. Tucker	·	1.6 km	MPC · JPL
606733	2018 VR_{46}	—	October 13, 2007	Mount Lemmon	Mount Lemmon Survey	·	1.9 km	MPC · JPL
606734	2018 VS_{58}	—	January 19, 2012	Kitt Peak	Spacewatch	·	1.0 km	MPC · JPL
606735	2018 VT_{60}	—	May 27, 2012	Mount Lemmon	Mount Lemmon Survey	(194)	1.5 km	MPC · JPL
606736	2018 VA_{62}	—	December 14, 2001	Socorro	LINEAR	·	1.8 km	MPC · JPL
606737	2018 VD_{62}	—	October 10, 2007	Mount Lemmon	Mount Lemmon Survey	·	860 m	MPC · JPL
606738	2018 VH_{63}	—	March 11, 2016	Haleakala	Pan-STARRS 1	EUN	770 m	MPC · JPL
606739	2018 VJ_{63}	—	October 14, 2007	Catalina	CSS	H	410 m	MPC · JPL
606740	2018 VO_{64}	—	September 14, 2007	Mount Lemmon	Mount Lemmon Survey	·	1.8 km	MPC · JPL
606741	2018 VV_{64}	—	November 1, 2007	Kitt Peak	Spacewatch	·	2.2 km	MPC · JPL
606742	2018 VW_{69}	—	October 8, 2012	Haleakala	Pan-STARRS 1	·	3.1 km	MPC · JPL
606743	2018 VV_{76}	—	October 30, 2005	Mount Lemmon	Mount Lemmon Survey	·	1.8 km	MPC · JPL
606744	2018 VU_{77}	—	May 19, 2006	Mount Lemmon	Mount Lemmon Survey	·	2.4 km	MPC · JPL
606745	2018 VB_{79}	—	November 3, 2007	Kitt Peak	Spacewatch	·	1.9 km	MPC · JPL
606746	2018 VC_{79}	—	October 30, 2005	Kitt Peak	Spacewatch	JUN	610 m	MPC · JPL
606747	2018 VW_{79}	—	January 14, 2002	Kitt Peak	Spacewatch	·	1.5 km	MPC · JPL
606748	2018 VY_{79}	—	November 23, 2014	Haleakala	Pan-STARRS 1	·	930 m	MPC · JPL
606749	2018 VW_{80}	—	January 30, 2015	Haleakala	Pan-STARRS 1	·	2.7 km	MPC · JPL
606750	2018 VT_{82}	—	September 4, 2014	Haleakala	Pan-STARRS 1	MAR	870 m	MPC · JPL
606751	2018 VK_{83}	—	October 15, 2007	Anderson Mesa	LONEOS	·	2.1 km	MPC · JPL
606752	2018 VB_{95}	—	March 26, 2007	Kitt Peak	Spacewatch	·	410 m	MPC · JPL
606753	2018 VM_{95}	—	November 9, 2009	Mount Lemmon	Mount Lemmon Survey	AGN	950 m	MPC · JPL
606754	2018 VN_{102}	—	October 10, 2018	Mount Lemmon	Mount Lemmon Survey	H	410 m	MPC · JPL
606755	2018 VV_{110}	—	January 19, 2009	Socorro	LINEAR	·	2.5 km	MPC · JPL
606756	2018 VA_{129}	—	November 9, 2018	Haleakala	Pan-STARRS 2	·	2.4 km	MPC · JPL
606757	2018 VA_{141}	—	November 2, 2018	Haleakala	Pan-STARRS 2	GEF	1.1 km	MPC · JPL
606758	2018 VL_{146}	—	November 9, 2018	Mount Lemmon	Mount Lemmon Survey	GAL	1.3 km	MPC · JPL
606759	2018 WU_{3}	—	April 27, 2012	Haleakala	Pan-STARRS 1	·	890 m	MPC · JPL
606760	2018 XF_{1}	—	April 1, 2014	Catalina	CSS	H	690 m	MPC · JPL
606761	2018 XP_{1}	—	June 23, 2012	Kitt Peak	Spacewatch	H	520 m	MPC · JPL
606762	2018 XV_{7}	—	September 15, 2012	Catalina	CSS	·	2.5 km	MPC · JPL
606763	2018 XE_{11}	—	January 7, 2010	Mount Lemmon	Mount Lemmon Survey	·	1.6 km	MPC · JPL
606764	2018 XB_{13}	—	September 26, 2001	Anderson Mesa	LONEOS	·	2.9 km	MPC · JPL
606765	2018 XP_{16}	—	December 10, 2010	Kitt Peak	Spacewatch	·	1.4 km	MPC · JPL
606766	2018 XC_{17}	—	August 28, 2013	Haleakala	Pan-STARRS 1	EUN	960 m	MPC · JPL
606767	2018 XR_{19}	—	February 27, 2015	Mount Lemmon	Mount Lemmon Survey	·	2.1 km	MPC · JPL
606768	2018 XG_{20}	—	September 19, 2009	Mount Lemmon	Mount Lemmon Survey	·	2.0 km	MPC · JPL
606769	2018 XT_{20}	—	March 1, 2004	Kitt Peak	Spacewatch	MAS	890 m	MPC · JPL
606770	2018 YJ_{3}	—	August 29, 2009	Kitt Peak	Spacewatch	MIS	1.7 km	MPC · JPL
606771	2018 YY_{3}	—	March 3, 2008	Siding Spring	SSS	H	690 m	MPC · JPL
606772	2018 YT_{4}	—	October 8, 2007	Mount Lemmon	Mount Lemmon Survey	·	1.5 km	MPC · JPL
606773	2018 YL_{14}	—	December 16, 2018	Haleakala	Pan-STARRS 1	·	1.3 km	MPC · JPL
606774	2019 AP_{1}	—	January 3, 2016	Haleakala	Pan-STARRS 1	H	440 m	MPC · JPL
606775	2019 AS_{1}	—	July 25, 2015	Haleakala	Pan-STARRS 1	H	440 m	MPC · JPL
606776	2019 AK_{5}	—	October 13, 2015	Catalina	CSS	H	480 m	MPC · JPL
606777	2019 AP_{10}	—	December 30, 2013	Mount Lemmon	Mount Lemmon Survey	H	430 m	MPC · JPL
606778	2019 AH_{16}	—	March 30, 2015	Haleakala	Pan-STARRS 1	·	2.5 km	MPC · JPL
606779	2019 AN_{17}	—	November 7, 2007	Kitt Peak	Spacewatch	·	940 m	MPC · JPL
606780	2019 AB_{23}	—	October 19, 2007	Kitt Peak	Spacewatch	·	540 m	MPC · JPL
606781	2019 AL_{24}	—	October 8, 2012	Haleakala	Pan-STARRS 1	·	2.3 km	MPC · JPL
606782	2019 AN_{28}	—	December 12, 2014	Haleakala	Pan-STARRS 1	V	510 m	MPC · JPL
606783	2019 AS_{28}	—	November 30, 2008	Kitt Peak	Spacewatch	·	2.4 km	MPC · JPL
606784	2019 AS_{29}	—	October 8, 2012	Mount Lemmon	Mount Lemmon Survey	·	2.4 km	MPC · JPL
606785	2019 AR_{36}	—	February 28, 2008	Mount Lemmon	Mount Lemmon Survey	·	1.0 km	MPC · JPL
606786	2019 AM_{38}	—	August 10, 2004	Campo Imperatore	CINEOS	·	680 m	MPC · JPL
606787	2019 AU_{41}	—	February 7, 2002	Kitt Peak	Spacewatch	·	1.1 km	MPC · JPL
606788	2019 BV	—	April 25, 2017	Mount Lemmon	Mount Lemmon Survey	H	580 m	MPC · JPL
606789	2019 BZ_{1}	—	August 27, 2005	Palomar	NEAT	H	390 m	MPC · JPL
606790	2019 BK_{3}	—	October 24, 2016	Mount Lemmon	Mount Lemmon Survey	·	4.6 km	MPC · JPL
606791	2019 BX_{5}	—	October 23, 2012	Catalina	CSS	·	2.9 km	MPC · JPL
606792	2019 BA_{6}	—	September 11, 2007	Mount Lemmon	Mount Lemmon Survey	·	2.3 km	MPC · JPL
606793	2019 BH_{6}	—	September 22, 2009	Mount Lemmon	Mount Lemmon Survey	·	1.7 km	MPC · JPL
606794	2019 BS_{7}	—	November 26, 2012	Mount Lemmon	Mount Lemmon Survey	·	2.1 km	MPC · JPL
606795	2019 CC_{6}	—	April 28, 2004	Kitt Peak	Spacewatch	·	1.2 km	MPC · JPL
606796	2019 CH_{6}	—	January 7, 2002	Kitt Peak	Spacewatch	·	2.7 km	MPC · JPL
606797	2019 CB_{7}	—	February 1, 2012	Kitt Peak	Spacewatch	V	590 m	MPC · JPL
606798	2019 CJ_{8}	—	September 10, 2010	Dauban	C. Rinner, Kugel, F.	·	910 m	MPC · JPL
606799	2019 CA_{10}	—	December 31, 2007	Kitt Peak	Spacewatch	·	1.1 km	MPC · JPL
606800	2019 DG_{4}	—	April 28, 2014	Cerro Tololo	DECam	·	2.6 km	MPC · JPL

== 606801–606900 ==
back to top

Designation			Discovery			Properties		Ref
Permanent	Provisional	Named after	Date	Site	Discoverer(s)	Category	Diam.	Ref
606801	2019 EY_{2}	—	January 16, 2008	Mount Lemmon	Mount Lemmon Survey	V	680 m	MPC · JPL
606802	2019 EZ_{2}	—	September 12, 2013	Mount Lemmon	Mount Lemmon Survey	PHO	900 m	MPC · JPL
606803	2019 FE_{4}	—	May 3, 2006	Catalina	CSS	·	1.3 km	MPC · JPL
606804	2019 FK_{4}	—	February 10, 2008	Catalina	CSS	H	480 m	MPC · JPL
606805	2019 FN_{4}	—	February 10, 2014	Haleakala	Pan-STARRS 1	·	2.1 km	MPC · JPL
606806	2019 FO_{4}	—	January 18, 2015	Haleakala	Pan-STARRS 1	·	1.2 km	MPC · JPL
606807	2019 FP_{4}	—	September 24, 2006	Kitt Peak	Spacewatch	·	1.1 km	MPC · JPL
606808	2019 FQ_{4}	—	October 12, 2007	Kitt Peak	Spacewatch	·	1.8 km	MPC · JPL
606809	2019 FB_{8}	—	September 27, 2003	Kitt Peak	Spacewatch	·	1.2 km	MPC · JPL
606810	2019 FD_{9}	—	March 25, 2003	Kitt Peak	Spacewatch	·	1.8 km	MPC · JPL
606811	2019 FX_{12}	—	August 3, 2016	Haleakala	Pan-STARRS 1	·	1.3 km	MPC · JPL
606812	2019 FL_{14}	—	December 22, 2008	Kitt Peak	Spacewatch	·	1.4 km	MPC · JPL
606813	2019 FS_{14}	—	April 5, 2014	Haleakala	Pan-STARRS 1	EOS	1.3 km	MPC · JPL
606814	2019 GA_{1}	—	July 29, 2009	Kitt Peak	Spacewatch	H	700 m	MPC · JPL
606815	2019 GE_{5}	—	August 16, 2001	Palomar	NEAT	H	590 m	MPC · JPL
606816	2019 GL_{6}	—	November 2, 2008	Mount Lemmon	Mount Lemmon Survey	·	1.6 km	MPC · JPL
606817	2019 GU_{8}	—	February 28, 2009	Mount Lemmon	Mount Lemmon Survey	·	530 m	MPC · JPL
606818	2019 GB_{9}	—	November 27, 2010	Mount Lemmon	Mount Lemmon Survey	·	1.1 km	MPC · JPL
606819	2019 GK_{10}	—	April 24, 2012	Mount Lemmon	Mount Lemmon Survey	·	690 m	MPC · JPL
606820	2019 GY_{10}	—	February 25, 2006	Kitt Peak	Spacewatch	ADE	1.6 km	MPC · JPL
606821	2019 GH_{11}	—	October 9, 2007	Mount Lemmon	Mount Lemmon Survey	·	1.3 km	MPC · JPL
606822	2019 GN_{11}	—	January 26, 2011	Kitt Peak	Spacewatch	CLA	1.5 km	MPC · JPL
606823	2019 GM_{12}	—	March 11, 2005	Kitt Peak	Spacewatch	·	2.2 km	MPC · JPL
606824	2019 GC_{14}	—	February 24, 2006	Kitt Peak	Spacewatch	·	560 m	MPC · JPL
606825	2019 GD_{14}	—	March 29, 2008	Kitt Peak	Spacewatch	L5	7.0 km	MPC · JPL
606826	2019 GJ_{15}	—	September 27, 2003	Kitt Peak	Spacewatch	WIT	740 m	MPC · JPL
606827	2019 GE_{17}	—	July 28, 2011	Haleakala	Pan-STARRS 1	L5	8.6 km	MPC · JPL
606828	2019 GA_{18}	—	September 11, 2010	Mount Lemmon	Mount Lemmon Survey	(2076)	710 m	MPC · JPL
606829	2019 GE_{18}	—	February 9, 2008	Mount Lemmon	Mount Lemmon Survey	·	2.9 km	MPC · JPL
606830	2019 GW_{18}	—	November 8, 2016	Haleakala	Pan-STARRS 1	L5	7.5 km	MPC · JPL
606831	2019 GZ_{20}	—	October 27, 2014	Haleakala	Pan-STARRS 1	L5	8.9 km	MPC · JPL
606832	2019 GP_{24}	—	May 12, 2011	Mount Lemmon	Mount Lemmon Survey	·	1.5 km	MPC · JPL
606833	2019 GJ_{40}	—	January 29, 2014	Kitt Peak	Spacewatch	·	1.5 km	MPC · JPL
606834	2019 GA_{43}	—	April 15, 2015	Kitt Peak	Spacewatch	·	910 m	MPC · JPL
606835	2019 GU_{43}	—	April 29, 2008	Kitt Peak	Spacewatch	·	830 m	MPC · JPL
606836	2019 GJ_{49}	—	September 17, 2010	Mount Lemmon	Mount Lemmon Survey	EOS	1.2 km	MPC · JPL
606837	2019 GE_{50}	—	April 3, 2019	Haleakala	Pan-STARRS 1	·	1.5 km	MPC · JPL
606838	2019 GQ_{50}	—	April 2, 2019	Haleakala	Pan-STARRS 1	·	2.1 km	MPC · JPL
606839	2019 GW_{66}	—	April 3, 2019	Haleakala	Pan-STARRS 1	·	2.3 km	MPC · JPL
606840	2019 GH_{71}	—	December 13, 2017	Haleakala	Pan-STARRS 1	·	2.4 km	MPC · JPL
606841	2019 HQ_{1}	—	January 23, 2006	Kitt Peak	Spacewatch	·	1.2 km	MPC · JPL
606842	2019 JD	—	April 30, 2008	Catalina	CSS	T_{j} (2.97)	3.7 km	MPC · JPL
606843	2019 JN	—	April 5, 2019	Haleakala	Pan-STARRS 1	·	430 m	MPC · JPL
606844	2019 JV_{4}	—	April 11, 2003	Kitt Peak	Spacewatch	·	580 m	MPC · JPL
606845	2019 JR_{6}	—	January 17, 2011	Mount Lemmon	Mount Lemmon Survey	H	460 m	MPC · JPL
606846	2019 JN_{9}	—	February 21, 2014	Haleakala	Pan-STARRS 1	GAL	1.5 km	MPC · JPL
606847	2019 JX_{9}	—	March 18, 2013	Mount Lemmon	Mount Lemmon Survey	·	2.4 km	MPC · JPL
606848	2019 JY_{9}	—	November 16, 2006	Mount Lemmon	Mount Lemmon Survey	EOS	1.7 km	MPC · JPL
606849	2019 JZ_{9}	—	January 20, 2018	Mount Lemmon	Mount Lemmon Survey	·	2.7 km	MPC · JPL
606850	2019 JH_{10}	—	October 7, 2004	Kitt Peak	Spacewatch	·	1.8 km	MPC · JPL
606851	2019 JY_{10}	—	March 9, 2015	Mount Lemmon	Mount Lemmon Survey	·	950 m	MPC · JPL
606852	2019 JJ_{11}	—	September 10, 2015	Haleakala	Pan-STARRS 1	·	2.9 km	MPC · JPL
606853	2019 JP_{11}	—	January 19, 2005	Kitt Peak	Spacewatch	·	1.7 km	MPC · JPL
606854	2019 JL_{12}	—	November 19, 2007	Kitt Peak	Spacewatch	·	2.9 km	MPC · JPL
606855	2019 JU_{12}	—	September 9, 2015	Haleakala	Pan-STARRS 1	·	1.3 km	MPC · JPL
606856	2019 JG_{16}	—	April 12, 2005	Kitt Peak	Spacewatch	·	1.9 km	MPC · JPL
606857	2019 JX_{17}	—	May 2, 2008	Kitt Peak	Spacewatch	·	2.1 km	MPC · JPL
606858	2019 JO_{18}	—	November 10, 2010	Mount Lemmon	Mount Lemmon Survey	·	2.4 km	MPC · JPL
606859	2019 JU_{20}	—	February 4, 2009	Mount Lemmon	Mount Lemmon Survey	·	530 m	MPC · JPL
606860	2019 JZ_{20}	—	September 13, 2005	Kitt Peak	Spacewatch	·	890 m	MPC · JPL
606861	2019 JK_{21}	—	July 25, 2015	Haleakala	Pan-STARRS 1	·	2.4 km	MPC · JPL
606862	2019 JY_{21}	—	May 28, 2014	Mount Lemmon	Mount Lemmon Survey	·	1.6 km	MPC · JPL
606863	2019 JM_{23}	—	March 12, 2013	Kitt Peak	Spacewatch	·	2.6 km	MPC · JPL
606864	2019 JQ_{23}	—	May 21, 2006	Mount Lemmon	Mount Lemmon Survey	·	1.3 km	MPC · JPL
606865	2019 JJ_{24}	—	May 25, 2006	Mount Lemmon	Mount Lemmon Survey	·	1.3 km	MPC · JPL
606866	2019 JQ_{24}	—	April 6, 2008	Mount Lemmon	Mount Lemmon Survey	·	2.1 km	MPC · JPL
606867	2019 JR_{24}	—	December 30, 2014	Oukaïmeden	M. Ory	·	690 m	MPC · JPL
606868	2019 JH_{26}	—	November 14, 2012	Kitt Peak	Spacewatch	·	950 m	MPC · JPL
606869	2019 JJ_{26}	—	November 13, 2012	Mount Lemmon	Mount Lemmon Survey	·	1.0 km	MPC · JPL
606870	2019 JU_{26}	—	May 7, 2014	Haleakala	Pan-STARRS 1	·	1.3 km	MPC · JPL
606871	2019 JN_{29}	—	November 1, 2007	Kitt Peak	Spacewatch	HOF	2.1 km	MPC · JPL
606872	2019 JK_{31}	—	November 7, 2007	Mount Lemmon	Mount Lemmon Survey	·	1.6 km	MPC · JPL
606873	2019 JO_{32}	—	November 8, 2007	Mount Lemmon	Mount Lemmon Survey	·	1.5 km	MPC · JPL
606874	2019 JS_{32}	—	November 8, 2010	Mount Lemmon	Mount Lemmon Survey	·	2.9 km	MPC · JPL
606875 Bertgrice	2019 JW_{32}	Bertgrice	December 13, 2012	Mayhill	Falla, N.	·	1.8 km	MPC · JPL
606876	2019 JY_{32}	—	April 9, 2006	Kitt Peak	Spacewatch	·	1.6 km	MPC · JPL
606877	2019 JZ_{32}	—	November 25, 2005	Kitt Peak	Spacewatch	·	2.7 km	MPC · JPL
606878	2019 JF_{33}	—	January 21, 2015	Haleakala	Pan-STARRS 1	·	820 m	MPC · JPL
606879	2019 JL_{33}	—	May 21, 2015	Haleakala	Pan-STARRS 1	·	1.2 km	MPC · JPL
606880	2019 JT_{34}	—	May 21, 2012	Mount Lemmon	Mount Lemmon Survey	NYS	660 m	MPC · JPL
606881	2019 JW_{34}	—	August 19, 2012	Siding Spring	SSS	·	1.4 km	MPC · JPL
606882	2019 JW_{35}	—	December 6, 2012	Mount Lemmon	Mount Lemmon Survey	·	1.2 km	MPC · JPL
606883	2019 JV_{36}	—	September 8, 2015	Haleakala	Pan-STARRS 1	·	2.2 km	MPC · JPL
606884	2019 JW_{36}	—	November 2, 2010	Mount Lemmon	Mount Lemmon Survey	·	2.1 km	MPC · JPL
606885	2019 JY_{39}	—	April 6, 2014	Mount Lemmon	Mount Lemmon Survey	·	1.6 km	MPC · JPL
606886	2019 JG_{40}	—	February 10, 2007	Mount Lemmon	Mount Lemmon Survey	EOS	1.6 km	MPC · JPL
606887	2019 JV_{40}	—	May 9, 2014	Haleakala	Pan-STARRS 1	·	2.5 km	MPC · JPL
606888	2019 JD_{41}	—	June 20, 2014	Haleakala	Pan-STARRS 1	·	2.8 km	MPC · JPL
606889	2019 JN_{41}	—	May 14, 2008	Mount Lemmon	Mount Lemmon Survey	·	2.5 km	MPC · JPL
606890	2019 JS_{41}	—	November 3, 2007	Kitt Peak	Spacewatch	HOF	1.9 km	MPC · JPL
606891	2019 JO_{42}	—	September 4, 2011	Kitt Peak	Spacewatch	·	1.5 km	MPC · JPL
606892	2019 JU_{42}	—	May 13, 2015	Mount Lemmon	Mount Lemmon Survey	(5)	1.1 km	MPC · JPL
606893	2019 JE_{44}	—	September 8, 2011	Kitt Peak	Spacewatch	·	1.9 km	MPC · JPL
606894	2019 JO_{44}	—	November 26, 2016	Mount Lemmon	Mount Lemmon Survey	·	2.3 km	MPC · JPL
606895	2019 JX_{45}	—	August 29, 2013	Haleakala	Pan-STARRS 1	·	600 m	MPC · JPL
606896	2019 JD_{46}	—	September 27, 2009	Mount Lemmon	Mount Lemmon Survey	·	510 m	MPC · JPL
606897	2019 JE_{46}	—	March 1, 2009	Kitt Peak	Spacewatch	AGN	1.2 km	MPC · JPL
606898	2019 JN_{46}	—	May 25, 2015	Haleakala	Pan-STARRS 1	JUN	930 m	MPC · JPL
606899	2019 JR_{46}	—	September 18, 2006	Kitt Peak	Spacewatch	·	2.2 km	MPC · JPL
606900	2019 JC_{47}	—	May 12, 2019	Haleakala	Pan-STARRS 1	AMO	290 m	MPC · JPL

== 606901–607000 ==
back to top

Designation			Discovery			Properties		Ref
Permanent	Provisional	Named after	Date	Site	Discoverer(s)	Category	Diam.	Ref
606901	2019 JQ_{52}	—	October 13, 2012	Haleakala	Pan-STARRS 1	·	1.8 km	MPC · JPL
606902	2019 JB_{59}	—	April 2, 2014	Mount Lemmon	Mount Lemmon Survey	HOF	2.0 km	MPC · JPL
606903	2019 JG_{62}	—	May 8, 2019	Haleakala	Pan-STARRS 1	·	1.2 km	MPC · JPL
606904	2019 JL_{62}	—	May 7, 2019	Haleakala	Pan-STARRS 1	·	2.3 km	MPC · JPL
606905	2019 JC_{77}	—	May 11, 2019	Haleakala	Pan-STARRS 1	EOS	1.7 km	MPC · JPL
606906	2019 KK_{1}	—	March 9, 2018	Mount Lemmon	Mount Lemmon Survey	L5	8.8 km	MPC · JPL
606907	2019 KY_{1}	—	September 12, 2010	La Sagra	OAM	·	620 m	MPC · JPL
606908	2019 KB_{2}	—	February 25, 2006	Kitt Peak	Spacewatch	AMO	770 m	MPC · JPL
606909	2019 KQ_{2}	—	April 27, 2016	Haleakala	Pan-STARRS 1	H	460 m	MPC · JPL
606910	2019 KH_{7}	—	May 30, 2019	Haleakala	Pan-STARRS 1	·	1.3 km	MPC · JPL
606911	2019 KG_{17}	—	April 1, 2003	Apache Point	SDSS Collaboration	EOS	1.4 km	MPC · JPL
606912	2019 KF_{20}	—	May 26, 2019	Haleakala	Pan-STARRS 1	·	1.5 km	MPC · JPL
606913	2019 LV_{18}	—	September 29, 2009	Mount Lemmon	Mount Lemmon Survey	·	2.3 km	MPC · JPL
606914	2019 ML_{1}	—	October 10, 1996	Kitt Peak	Spacewatch	H	400 m	MPC · JPL
606915	2019 MK_{7}	—	August 4, 2012	Haleakala	Pan-STARRS 1	·	860 m	MPC · JPL
606916	2019 MQ_{8}	—	June 11, 2015	Haleakala	Pan-STARRS 1	·	990 m	MPC · JPL
606917	2019 MJ_{12}	—	June 30, 2019	Haleakala	Pan-STARRS 1	L4	6.4 km	MPC · JPL
606918	2019 MF_{15}	—	November 25, 2009	Mount Lemmon	Mount Lemmon Survey	L4	7.1 km	MPC · JPL
606919	2019 NL	—	August 22, 2011	Haleakala	Pan-STARRS 1	BAR	1.1 km	MPC · JPL
606920	2019 NQ_{1}	—	July 30, 2011	Siding Spring	SSS	·	1.8 km	MPC · JPL
606921	2019 NR_{5}	—	June 26, 2015	Haleakala	Pan-STARRS 1	·	770 m	MPC · JPL
606922	2019 NY_{6}	—	March 29, 2008	Mount Lemmon	Mount Lemmon Survey	·	820 m	MPC · JPL
606923	2019 NC_{10}	—	January 10, 2013	Haleakala	Pan-STARRS 1	L4 · ERY	5.8 km	MPC · JPL
606924	2019 NE_{12}	—	July 1, 2019	Haleakala	Pan-STARRS 1	·	1.1 km	MPC · JPL
606925	2019 NW_{21}	—	August 26, 2008	La Sagra	OAM	·	2.1 km	MPC · JPL
606926	2019 NS_{22}	—	December 7, 2012	Haleakala	Pan-STARRS 1	PHO	1 km	MPC · JPL
606927	2019 NJ_{38}	—	July 4, 2019	Haleakala	Pan-STARRS 1	L4	6.1 km	MPC · JPL
606928	2019 OZ_{4}	—	December 27, 2016	Mount Lemmon	Mount Lemmon Survey	T_{j} (2.97) · EUP	4.2 km	MPC · JPL
606929	2019 OZ_{6}	—	February 28, 2014	Haleakala	Pan-STARRS 1	L4	6.4 km	MPC · JPL
606930	2019 PJ_{11}	—	March 12, 2008	Kitt Peak	Spacewatch	·	590 m	MPC · JPL
606931	2019 PA_{30}	—	July 21, 2006	Catalina	CSS	·	1.7 km	MPC · JPL
606932	2019 PJ_{32}	—	April 11, 2007	Kitt Peak	Spacewatch	V	530 m	MPC · JPL
606933	2019 PC_{37}	—	March 21, 2015	Haleakala	Pan-STARRS 1	L4	8.2 km	MPC · JPL
606934	2019 QD_{5}	—	July 18, 2012	Siding Spring	SSS	·	640 m	MPC · JPL
606935	2019 QK_{50}	—	July 25, 2015	Haleakala	Pan-STARRS 1	EUN	700 m	MPC · JPL
606936	2019 RL_{57}	—	June 18, 2018	Haleakala	Pan-STARRS 1	L4 · ERY	5.9 km	MPC · JPL
606937	2019 RQ_{67}	—	December 1, 2011	Haleakala	Pan-STARRS 1	·	1.0 km	MPC · JPL
606938	2019 SO_{2}	—	July 13, 2019	Haleakala	Pan-STARRS 1	·	790 m	MPC · JPL
606939	2019 SD_{3}	—	September 22, 2019	Haleakala	Pan-STARRS 1	AMO	160 m	MPC · JPL
606940	2019 SM_{3}	—	June 13, 2016	Haleakala	Pan-STARRS 1	H	480 m	MPC · JPL
606941	2019 SB_{8}	—	August 8, 2019	Haleakala	Pan-STARRS 1	·	480 m	MPC · JPL
606942	2019 SD_{9}	—	September 25, 2019	Haleakala	Pan-STARRS 1	·	1.0 km	MPC · JPL
606943	2019 SO_{18}	—	April 5, 2014	Haleakala	Pan-STARRS 1	·	1.2 km	MPC · JPL
606944	2019 SH_{22}	—	June 12, 2008	Kitt Peak	Spacewatch	·	2.4 km	MPC · JPL
606945	2019 SG_{79}	—	April 5, 2011	Mount Lemmon	Mount Lemmon Survey	·	2.4 km	MPC · JPL
606946	2019 TL_{7}	—	November 11, 2005	Kitt Peak	Spacewatch	·	2.1 km	MPC · JPL
606947	2019 TG_{39}	—	July 2, 2014	Haleakala	Pan-STARRS 1	·	1.2 km	MPC · JPL
606948	2019 TP_{54}	—	November 13, 2010	Mount Lemmon	Mount Lemmon Survey	GEF	900 m	MPC · JPL
606949	2019 UE	—	February 3, 2008	Catalina	CSS	H	400 m	MPC · JPL
606950	2019 UQ_{23}	—	September 30, 2003	Kitt Peak	Spacewatch	·	1.1 km	MPC · JPL
606951	2019 VX_{27}	—	September 19, 2014	Haleakala	Pan-STARRS 1	WIT	570 m	MPC · JPL
606952	2019 WF_{6}	—	September 28, 2002	Haleakala	NEAT	·	1.3 km	MPC · JPL
606953	2019 WN_{7}	—	November 28, 2019	Haleakala	Pan-STARRS 1	H	350 m	MPC · JPL
606954	2019 WO_{7}	—	April 9, 2016	Haleakala	Pan-STARRS 1	·	1.7 km	MPC · JPL
606955	2019 WE_{14}	—	March 17, 2012	Mount Lemmon	Mount Lemmon Survey	·	1.3 km	MPC · JPL
606956	2019 XE	—	March 28, 2018	Mount Lemmon	Mount Lemmon Survey	H	350 m	MPC · JPL
606957	2019 XB_{4}	—	September 7, 2019	Palomar	Zwicky Transient Facility	·	1.7 km	MPC · JPL
606958	2019 XE_{4}	—	December 3, 2019	Haleakala	Pan-STARRS 2	H	390 m	MPC · JPL
606959	2019 XS_{10}	—	January 30, 2011	Mount Lemmon	Mount Lemmon Survey	·	1.7 km	MPC · JPL
606960	2020 AR	—	December 7, 2019	Mount Lemmon	Mount Lemmon Survey	H	320 m	MPC · JPL
606961	2020 AD_{4}	—	March 3, 2006	Catalina	CSS	·	700 m	MPC · JPL
606962	2020 BM_{4}	—	August 1, 2016	Haleakala	Pan-STARRS 1	·	270 m	MPC · JPL
606963	2020 BX_{59}	—	September 12, 2007	Catalina	CSS	·	1.2 km	MPC · JPL
606964	2020 FC_{14}	—	June 14, 2005	Kitt Peak	Spacewatch	·	1.1 km	MPC · JPL
606965	2020 GL_{6}	—	February 17, 2007	Kitt Peak	Spacewatch	·	1.1 km	MPC · JPL
606966	2020 GN_{6}	—	November 10, 2013	Mount Lemmon	Mount Lemmon Survey	·	1.1 km	MPC · JPL
606967	2020 GA_{23}	—	September 5, 2008	Kitt Peak	Spacewatch	·	2.0 km	MPC · JPL
606968	2020 HS_{13}	—	April 4, 2005	Catalina	CSS	·	980 m	MPC · JPL
606969	2020 HT_{15}	—	May 10, 2013	Kitt Peak	Spacewatch	(2076)	630 m	MPC · JPL
606970	2020 HL_{16}	—	June 7, 2013	Haleakala	Pan-STARRS 1	·	720 m	MPC · JPL
606971	2020 HX_{24}	—	April 21, 2009	Kitt Peak	Spacewatch	MAS	540 m	MPC · JPL
606972	2020 HW_{26}	—	January 17, 2015	Haleakala	Pan-STARRS 1	·	1.1 km	MPC · JPL
606973	2020 HO_{30}	—	June 5, 2016	Haleakala	Pan-STARRS 1	·	890 m	MPC · JPL
606974	2020 HN_{35}	—	December 7, 2012	Haleakala	Pan-STARRS 1	·	1.7 km	MPC · JPL
606975	2020 JO_{5}	—	July 25, 2017	Haleakala	Pan-STARRS 1	·	520 m	MPC · JPL
606976	2020 JU_{6}	—	March 30, 2016	Haleakala	Pan-STARRS 1	·	920 m	MPC · JPL
606977	2020 JK_{8}	—	October 8, 2008	Kitt Peak	Spacewatch	·	1.1 km	MPC · JPL
606978	2020 JU_{8}	—	October 24, 2011	Haleakala	Pan-STARRS 1	·	630 m	MPC · JPL
606979	2020 JQ_{10}	—	March 26, 2011	Kitt Peak	Spacewatch	·	1.4 km	MPC · JPL
606980	2020 JY_{10}	—	October 24, 2008	Kitt Peak	Spacewatch	·	1.6 km	MPC · JPL
606981	2020 JQ_{17}	—	August 26, 2012	Haleakala	Pan-STARRS 1	·	1.2 km	MPC · JPL
606982	2020 KU_{28}	—	April 1, 2016	Haleakala	Pan-STARRS 1	·	680 m	MPC · JPL
606983	2020 MY_{4}	—	June 29, 2020	Haleakala	Pan-STARRS 1	·	1.2 km	MPC · JPL
606984	2020 MB_{7}	—	April 6, 2017	Haleakala	Pan-STARRS 1	H	390 m	MPC · JPL
606985	2020 OD_{8}	—	November 21, 1998	Kitt Peak	Spacewatch	centaur	10 km	MPC · JPL
606986	2020 OV_{11}	—	May 15, 2013	Haleakala	Pan-STARRS 1	·	530 m	MPC · JPL
606987	2020 PM_{55}	—	October 29, 2010	Mount Lemmon	Mount Lemmon Survey	L4	6.8 km	MPC · JPL
606988	2020 RR_{5}	—	September 14, 2020	Haleakala	Pan-STARRS 1	centaur	40 km	MPC · JPL
606989	2020 RV_{41}	—	September 5, 2008	Kitt Peak	Spacewatch	L4 · ERY	6.5 km	MPC · JPL
606990	2020 RF_{98}	—	September 29, 2009	Mount Lemmon	Mount Lemmon Survey	L4	6.3 km	MPC · JPL
606991	2020 SM_{7}	—	September 19, 2003	Palomar	NEAT	·	410 m	MPC · JPL
606992	2020 SE_{30}	—	November 16, 2010	Mount Lemmon	Mount Lemmon Survey	·	590 m	MPC · JPL
606993	2020 SU_{68}	—	December 13, 2010	Mount Lemmon	Mount Lemmon Survey	L4	7.0 km	MPC · JPL
606994	2020 TY_{15}	—	November 11, 2006	Mount Lemmon	Mount Lemmon Survey	·	1.5 km	MPC · JPL
606995	2020 TH_{17}	—	March 25, 2006	Mount Lemmon	Mount Lemmon Survey	·	1.1 km	MPC · JPL
606996	2020 TX_{18}	—	October 26, 2013	Mount Lemmon	Mount Lemmon Survey	·	720 m	MPC · JPL
606997	2020 TE_{20}	—	October 27, 2008	Mount Lemmon	Mount Lemmon Survey	·	550 m	MPC · JPL
606998	2020 UF_{39}	—	October 21, 2012	Kitt Peak	Spacewatch	·	1.0 km	MPC · JPL
606999	2020 XL_{17}	—	December 30, 2007	Kitt Peak	Spacewatch	·	1.1 km	MPC · JPL
607000	2020 YH_{9}	—	December 6, 2011	Haleakala	Pan-STARRS 1	·	1.5 km	MPC · JPL

back to top

== Meaning of names ==
As minor planet discoveries are confirmed, they are given a permanent number by the IAU's Minor Planet Center (MPC), and the discoverers can then submit names for them, following the IAU's naming conventions. The list below concerns those minor planets in the specified number-range that have received names, and explains the meanings of those names.

Official naming citations of newly named small Solar System bodies are approved and published in a bulletin by IAU's Working Group for Small Bodies Nomenclature (WGSBN). Before May 2021, citations were published in MPC's Minor Planet Circulars for many decades. Recent citations can also be found on the JPL Small-Body Database (SBDB). Until his death in 2016, German astronomer Lutz D. Schmadel compiled these citations into the Dictionary of Minor Planet Names (DMP) and regularly updated the collection.

Based on Paul Herget's The Names of the Minor Planets, Schmadel also researched the unclear origin of numerous asteroids, most of which had been named prior to World War II. This article incorporates text from this source, which is in the public domain: SBDB New namings may only be added to this list below after official publication as the preannouncement of names is condemned. The WGSBN publishes a comprehensive guideline for the naming rules of non-cometary small Solar System bodies.

Named minor planet	Provisional	This minor planet was named for...	Ref · Catalog
606017 Irimes	2017 DL_{25}	Romulus Irimes, a Romanian amateur astronomer.	IAU · 606017
606339 Kierpiec	2017 UY_{13}	Grzegorz Kierpiec (born 1980), a Polish school teacher and Catholic priest, known for his long-distance cycling expeditions.	IAU · 606339
606701 Golda	2018 SA_{16}	Zdzisław A. Golda (born 1953), a Polish astrophysicist and cosmologist at Jagiellonian University in Kraków.	IAU · 606701
606875 Bertgrice	2019 JW_{32}	Herbert Grice (1909–1991), the discoverer's father-in-law.	IAU · 606875
