= (606357) 2017 UV43 =

Centaur

(606357) 2017 UV_{43}
Discovery
- Discovered by: Mount Lemmon Srvy.
- Discovery site: Mount Lemmon Obs.
- Discovery date: 13 March 2005

Designations
- Alternative designations: 2005 EE_{207}
- Minor planet category: centaur; unusual; distant

Orbital characteristics
- Epoch 27 April 2019 (JD 2458600.5)
- Uncertainty parameter 3
- Observation arc: 12.78 yr (4,669 d)
- Aphelion: 8.4939 AU
- Perihelion: 4.9797 AU
- Semi-major axis: 6.7368 AU
- Eccentricity: 0.2608
- Orbital period (sidereal): 17.49 yr (6,387 d)
- Mean anomaly: 319.17°
- Mean motion: 0° 3^{m} 23.04^{s} / day
- Inclination: 5.2004°
- Longitude of ascending node: 320.86°
- Argument of perihelion: 181.57°
- Jupiter MOID: 0.2295 AU
- T_{Jupiter}: 2.9600

Physical characteristics
- Mean diameter: 8 km
- Geometric albedo: 0.09 (assumed)
- Absolute magnitude (H): 13.7

(606357) 2017 UV_{43} is a centaur from the outer Solar System, approximately 8 kilometers (5 miles) in diameter. It was discovered by the Mount Lemmon Survey on 13 March 2005. The unusual minor planet follows an orbit similar to those of the fragments of comet Shoemaker–Levy 9. This minor planet was numbered (606357) by the Minor Planet Center on 27 October 2021 (M.P.C. 136418). As of November 2021, it has not yet been named.

== Description ==
2017 UV_{43} is classified as an unusual object and centaur. It was first observed by the Mount Lemmon Survey on 13 March 2005. Previously, before the identification with 2005 EE_{207} was made, the first observation was made on 27 October 2017 by the Pan-STARRS program at Haleakala Observatory, Hawaii, United States.

It orbits the Sun at a distance of 5.0–8.5 AU once every 17 years and 6 months (6,387 days; semi-major axis of 6.74 AU). Its orbit has an eccentricity of 0.26 and an inclination of 5° with respect to the ecliptic. The body's observation arc begins with its first observation by the Mount Lemmon Survey in March 2005.

=== Comet Shoemaker–Levy 9 ===
As of December 2017, 2017 UV_{43} has an orbit similar to the average one of the fragments of comet Shoemaker–Levy 9 (semi-major axis: 6.81±0.04 AU, eccentricity: 0.210±0.004, inclination: 5.87°±0.08°, longitude of the ascending node: 220.8°±0.2° and argument of perihelion: 354.98°±0.05°).
