= 2009 =

2009 in various calendars
- Gregorian calendar: 2009; MMIX
- Ab urbe condita: 2762
- Armenian calendar: 1458; ԹՎ ՌՆԾԸ
- Assyrian calendar: 6759
- Baháʼí calendar: 165–166
- Balinese saka calendar: 1930–1931
- Bengali calendar: 1415–1416
- Berber calendar: 2959
- British Regnal year: 57 Eliz. 2 – 58 Eliz. 2
- Buddhist calendar: 2553
- Burmese calendar: 1371
- Byzantine calendar: 7517–7518
- Chinese calendar: 戊子年 (Earth Rat); 4706 or 4499 — to — 己丑年 (Earth Ox); 4707 or 4500
- Coptic calendar: 1725–1726
- Discordian calendar: 3175
- Ethiopian calendar: 2001–2002
- Hebrew calendar: 5769–5770
- Hindu calendars
- Vikram Samvat: 2065–2066
- Shaka Samvat: 1930–1931
- Kali Yuga: 5109–5110
- Holocene calendar: 12009
- Igbo calendar: 1009–1010
- Iranian calendar: 1387–1388
- Islamic calendar: 1430–1431
- Japanese calendar: Heisei 21 (平成２１年)
- Javanese calendar: 1941–1942
- Juche calendar: 98
- Julian calendar: Gregorian minus 13 days
- Korean calendar: 4342
- Minguo calendar: ROC 98 民國98年
- Nanakshahi calendar: 541
- Thai solar calendar: 2552
- Tibetan calendar: ས་ཕོ་བྱི་བ་ལོ་ (male Earth-Rat); 2135 or 1754 or 982 — to — ས་མོ་གླང་ལོ་ (female Earth-Ox); 2136 or 1755 or 983
- Unix time: 1230768000 – 1262303999

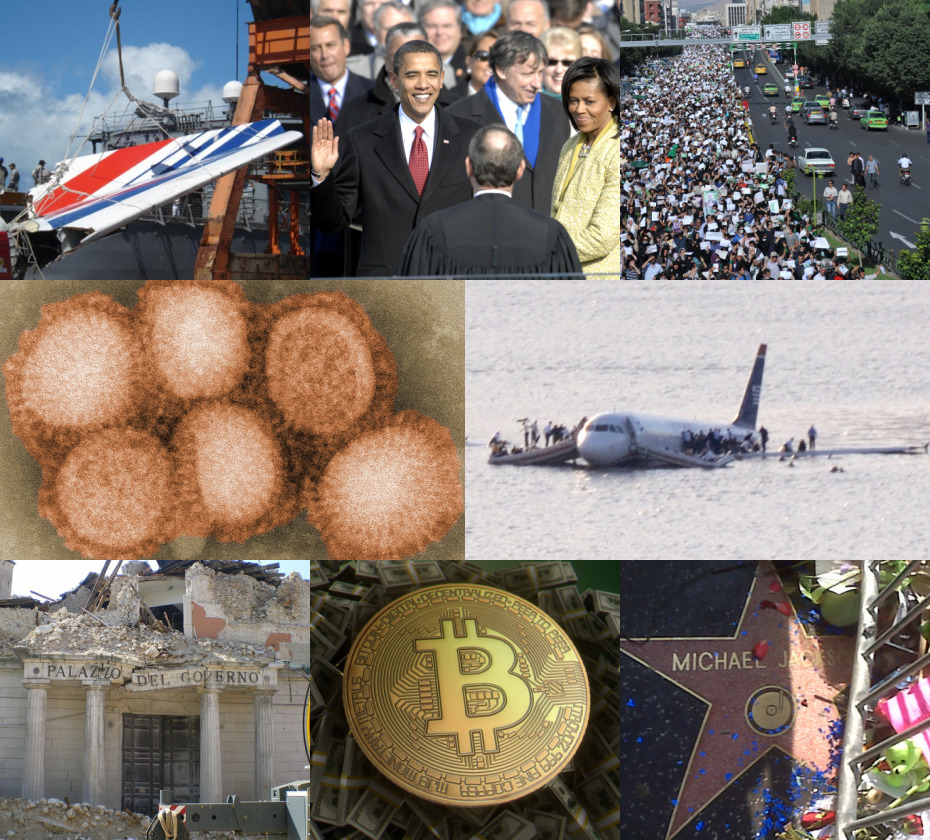
Clockwise from top-left: Air France Flight 447 crashes in the Atlantic Ocean, killing 228; Barack Obama becomes the first African American to become President of the United States; Protests erupt over the 2009 Iranian presidential election; US Airways Flight 1549 crash-lands in the Hudson River with no fatalities, with the event becoming known as the "Miracle on the Hudson"; The "King of Pop" Michael Jackson dies by acute propofol intoxication; Bitcoin is initially launched by the pseudonymous name Satoshi Nakamoto; An earthquake strikes central Italy, killing 308; The H1N1 virus is responsible for the swine flu pandemic.

2009 (MMIX) was a common year starting on Thursday of the Gregorian calendar, the 2009th year of the Common Era (CE) and Anno Domini (AD) designations, the 9th year of the 3rd millennium and the 21st century, and the 10th and last year of the 2000s decade.

2009 was designated as the International Year of Astronomy by the United Nations to coincide with the 400th anniversary of Galileo Galilei's first known astronomical studies with a telescope and the publication of Astronomia Nova by Johannes Kepler. It was also declared as the International Year of Natural Fibres by the United Nations General Assembly, as well as the International Year of Reconciliation and the Year of the Gorilla (UNEP and UNESCO).

== Population ==
The world population on January 1, 2009, was estimated to be 6.888 billion people and increased to 6.977 billion people by January 1, 2010. An estimated 143.0 million births and 54.1 million deaths took place in 2009. The average global life expectancy was 69.7 years, an increase of 0.4 years from 2008. The estimated number of global refugees decreased from 10.5 million to 10.4 million by the end of the year. The largest sources of refugees were Afghanistan with 2.9 million people and Iraq with 1.8 million people.

== Conflicts ==
There were 36 conflicts in 2009 that resulted in at least 25 fatalities, six of which resulted in at least 1,000 fatalities: the Taliban insurgency in Afghanistan, the Iraqi insurgency, the insurgency by the Pakistani Taliban, the conflict against the FDLR in Rwanda, Eelam War IV in Sri Lanka, and the Somali Civil War. All conflicts in 2009 were intrastate conflicts that involved violent non-state actors.

Several new conflicts began against rebel groups in 2009. The CPJP reignited conflict in the Central African Bush War, a faction of the NDFB broke a 2004 ceasefire with India in the Bodoland region, and a conflict broke out between Myanmar and the MNDAA when the government forced the MNDAA out of the Kokang. Boko Haram launched an insurgency in Nigeria, which was paused when its leader Mohammed Yusuf was killed.

Rwanda and the Democratic Republic of the Congo (DRC) resumed conflict against the FDLR when they launched Operation Umoja Wetu in January. The DRC and a United Nations mission launched Operation Kimia II against the FDLR in March after the group regained its strength. Conflict also resumed in Angola against the Forças Armadas de Cabinda, and al-Qaeda in the Arabian Peninsula formed in Yemen to expand al-Qaeda's insurgency in the country. Bombings continued during the Iraqi insurgency, including a series of attacks in Baghdad that killed over 100 people in December. The Maersk Alabama was hijacked by Somali pirates in April, prompting a rescue operation by the United States Navy.

The Ihussi Accord ended conflict between the Democratic Republic of the Congo and the CNDP within the broader Kivu conflict. This was the only peace agreement reached in 2009. Eelam War IV, the final stage in the Sri Lankan civil war, ended in May when the Sri Lankan government defeated the Liberation Tigers of Tamil Eelam. It remained the deadliest conflict of the year.

== Culture ==
The highest-grossing film globally in 2009 was Avatar, followed by Harry Potter and the Half-Blood Prince and Ice Age: Dawn of the Dinosaurs. The best-selling album globally in 2009 was I Dreamed a Dream by Susan Boyle, followed by The E.N.D. by the Black Eyed Peas and This Is It by Michael Jackson.

== Economy ==
The global economy began a slow recovery from its economic recession in late 2009 following a severe economic crisis the previous year. Gross world product shrank by 2.2% in 2009, which marked its first contraction since World War II. Unemployment increased and inflation decreased throughout the world.

== Environment and weather ==
The year 2009 tied with 2006 as the fifth hottest year on record. It began in a La Niña period which ran until April, and was followed by El Niño from June through the end of the year. In January, a heat wave in southern Australia caused record-breaking temperatures while extreme cold occurred in northern and eastern Europe. A cold wave took place in Canada and the midwestern United States in July.

Central Europe faced severe floods following heavy rain in June, while major floods occurred in Turkey in September in Italy and India in October. A magnitude 6.3 earthquake in Italy killed approximately 300 people in April, and a magnitude 7.5 earthquake in Indonesia killed approximately 1,100 people in September. An earthquake in the Pacific caused a major tsunami that struck American Samoa, Samoa, and Tonga.

The 2009 Atlantic hurricane season had nine named storms, including three hurricanes: Hurricane Bill, Hurricane Fred, and Hurricane Ida. This was the smallest number of named storms since the 1997 Atlantic hurricane season. The 2009 Pacific typhoon season was slightly below average in intensity overall, but it was the most destructive season for the Philippines in decades. The season had 25 named storms, including 14 typhoons. The most intense were Typhoon Nida, Typhoon Melor, Typhoon Choi-wan, Typhoon Lupit, and Typhoon Parma.

== Health ==
A swine flu pandemic caused by the H1N1 virus was the primary public health concern of 2009.

== Politics and law ==
The 2009 G20 summit took place in London and was met with major protests.

American journalists Euna Lee and Laura Ling were arrested by North Korea in March after being accused of crossing the China–North Korea border, and they were released in August.

== Events ==
=== January ===
- January 1
  - Japan, Mexico, Turkey and Uganda assume their seats on the United Nations Security Council.
  - Asunción, the capital of Paraguay, becomes the American Capital of Culture and Vilnius and Linz become the European Capitals of Culture.
  - Slovakia adopts the euro as its national currency, replacing the Slovak koruna.
  - A Bay Area Rapid Transit police officer shoots and kills Oscar Grant, an unarmed black man, at Fruitvale station in Oakland, United States. The event becomes one of the inciting incidents for the global Black Lives Matter movement.
- January 3 – The first ("Genesis") block of the blockchain of the cryptocurrency and decentralized payment system Bitcoin is established by the creator of the system, known as Satoshi Nakamoto.
- January 15 – US Airways Flight 1549 ditches in the Hudson River in an accident that becomes known as the "Miracle on the Hudson", as all 155 people on board are rescued.
- January 18 – Gaza War: Hamas announces that they will accept the Israel Defense Forces offer of a ceasefire, ending the conflict.
- January 20 – Barack Obama is sworn in as the 44th President of the United States, becoming the first African-American to hold the office.
- January 21
  - Israel withdraws from the Gaza Strip, officially ending its three-week war with Hamas. However, intermittent air strikes by both sides continue in the following weeks.
  - Virginia Tech student Zhu Haiyang decapitates Yang Xin in the first campus murder since the Virginia Tech shooting in 2007.
- January 26
  - The first trial at the International Criminal Court opens. Former Union of Congolese Patriots leader Thomas Lubanga Dyilo is accused of training child soldiers to kill, pillage and rape.
  - The Icelandic government and banking system collapse. Prime Minister Geir Haarde immediately resigns.
  - An annular solar eclipse takes place over the Indian Ocean, the 50th solar eclipse of Saros cycle 131.
- January 28 – WikiLeaks releases 86 intercepted telephone recordings of politicians and businessmen involved in the 2008 Peru oil scandal.
- January 31 – Tiféret Israel Synagogue attack, profanation of the oldest synagogue in Caracas, Venezuela.

=== February ===
- February 1
  - Patriarch Kirill of Moscow is enthroned as the Patriarch of the Russian Orthodox Church following the death of his predecessor, Alexy II in 2008.
  - Jóhanna Sigurðardóttir is appointed as the new Prime Minister of Iceland, becoming the world's first openly lesbian head of government.
- February 7 – Bushfires in Victoria leave 173 dead in the worst natural disaster in Australia's history.
- February 8 – 2009 Liechtenstein general election: The Patriotic Union led by Klaus Tschütscher wins a majority of 13 seats in the Landtag.
- February 12 – Colgan Air Flight 3407 crashes in Clarence Center, New York while on final approach to Buffalo Niagara International Airport, killing all 49 people on board the aircraft as well as one person on the ground.
- February 13 – At 23:31:30 UTC, the decimal representation of Unix time reached 1234567890 seconds. Celebrations were held around the world, among various technical subcultures, to celebrate the 1234567890th second.
- February 25 – Soldiers of Bangladeshi border security force Bangladesh Rifles (BDR) mutiny and take the commanding army officers and their families hostages at the force's headquarters in Pilkhana, Dhaka. 57 army officers are killed along with 17 civilians by the mutineers.
- February 26 – Former Serbian president Milan Milutinović is acquitted by the International Criminal Tribunal for the former Yugoslavia regarding war crimes during the Kosovo War.

=== March ===
- March 2 – The President of Guinea-Bissau, João Bernardo Vieira, is assassinated during an armed attack on his residence in Bissau.
- March 4 – The International Criminal Court issues an arrest warrant for Sudanese President Omar al-Bashir for war crimes and crimes against humanity in Darfur. al-Bashir is the first sitting head of state to be indicted by the ICC since its establishment in 2002.
- March 5 - Michael Jackson announces his This Is It concert residency in London, England. However, a fortnight before the concerts were supposed to begin, Jackson died at the age of 50 from acute propofol intoxication.
- March 7 – NASA's Kepler Mission, a space photometer that will search for extrasolar planets in the Milky Way galaxy, is launched from Cape Canaveral Air Force Station, Florida, USA.
- March 17 – The President of Madagascar, Marc Ravalomanana, is overthrown in a coup d'état, following a month of unrest in Antananarivo.
- March 23 – A McDonnell Douglas MD-11 operated by FedEx suffers a bounced landing at Narita international airport resulting in the loss of 2 lives.
- March 31 – Rachel Crandall Crocker founds the International Transgender Day of Visibility.

=== April ===
- April 1 – Albania and Croatia join NATO.
- April 5 – North Korea launches a rocket from its Tonghae Satellite Launching Ground, which it says is carrying the Kwangmyŏngsŏng-2 satellite, prompting an emergency meeting of the United Nations Security Council.
- April 6 – A 6.3 magnitude earthquake strikes near L'Aquila, Italy, killing 308 and injuring more than 1,500.
- April 7 – April 2009 Moldovan parliamentary election protests: four people died and 270 were injured.
- April 8 - April 12 – Maersk Alabama Hijacking occurs, the ship being taken over by Somali pirates off the coast of Somalia.
- April 21 – UNESCO launches The World Digital Library.

=== May ===
- May 11–24 – Space Shuttle Atlantis is launched to refurbish the Hubble Space Telescope on May 11, landing at Edwards Air Force Base May 24.
- May 12–16 – The Eurovision Song Contest 2009 takes place in Moscow, Russia, and is won by Norwegian entrant Alexander Rybak with the song "Fairytale".
- May 15
  - France–Pakistan Atomic Energy Framework bilateral energy treaty is signed.
  - The album 21st Century Breakdown is released by American rock band Green Day, which sold over 5 million copies.
- May 17 – Video game Minecraft, the best-selling video game of all time, is first released to the public.
- May 18 – Following more than 25 years of fighting, the Sri Lankan Civil War ends with the total military defeat of the Liberation Tigers of Tamil Eelam.
- May 19 – German football club RB Leipzig is founded by Red Bull.
- May 22 – Metalworkers at a Ssangyong Motor factory in Pyeongtaek, South Korea begin a 77-day strike.
- May 25 – North Korea announces that it has conducted a second successful nuclear test in North Hamgyong Province. The United Nations Security Council condemns the reported test.
- May 27 - AT&T Stadium, home of the NFL’s Dallas Cowboys, opens to the public

=== June ===
- June 1 – Air France Flight 447, en route from Rio de Janeiro, Brazil, to Paris, crashes into the Atlantic Ocean, killing all 228 on board.
- June 11 – The outbreak of the H1N1 influenza strain, commonly referred to as "swine flu", is deemed a global pandemic.
- June 12 – Analog television ends in the United States as part of the digital television transition.
- June 13 – Mass protests erupt across Iran following a disputed presidential election in which Mahmoud Ahmadinejad was reelected president, the largest demonstrations in the country since the Iranian Revolution.
- June 18 – NASA launches the Lunar Reconnaissance Orbiter / LCROSS probes to the Moon, the first American lunar mission since Lunar Prospector in 1998.
- June 19 – War in Afghanistan: British forces began Operation Panther's Claw, in which more than 350 troops made an aerial assault on Taliban positions in southern Afghanistan.
- June 21 – Greenland gains self-rule.
- June 22 – June 2009 Washington Metro train collision, 9 people were killed and 80 people were injured when a Red Line (Washington Metro) train rear ended another train between Takoma and Fort Totten stations, this resulted in the worst train crash in DC Metro's history.
- June 25 – The death of American pop star Michael Jackson triggers an outpouring of worldwide grief. Online, reactions to the event cripple several major websites and services, as the abundance of people accessing the web addresses pushes internet traffic to unprecedented and historic levels.
- June 28 – The Military of Honduras ousts Honduran President Manuel Zelaya in a coup d'état, condemned by OAS.
- June 29 – Viareggio train derailment occurred when a freight train carrying liquified petroleum gas derailed at Viareggio railway station in Lucca, Italy. The accident killed 32 people and injured 26 people.
- June 30 – Yemenia Flight 626 crashes off the coast of Moroni, Comoros, killing all but one of the 153 passengers and crew.

=== July ===
- July 4 – Steve McNair, former NFL quarterback for the Tennessee Titans, is shot and killed by his girlfriend in Nashville, Tennessee.
- July 5 – Violent riots broke out in Ürümqi, Xinjiang. PRC officials said that a total of 197 people died. Two monorails of the Walt Disney World Monorail System collided at the Transportation & Ticket Center in Bay Lake, Florida, United States, killing one pilot and injuring seven others.
- July 7 – A public memorial service for Michael Jackson is held at Staples Center. It is watched by over 2.5 billion people worldwide.
- July 15 – Caspian Airlines Flight 7908, en route from Tehran, Iran, to Yerevan, Armenia crashes into the Jannatabad village in Qazvin Province; killing all 168 on board.
- July 16 – Iceland's national parliament, the Althingi, votes to pursue joining the EU.
- July 17 – Two bombs exploded separately at the JW Marriott and Ritz-Carlton Hotels in Jakarta, Indonesia, killing 9 people (including 2 suicide bombers) and injuring 53.
- July 19 – Amateur astronomer Anthony Wesley is the first to report that a new dark spot has developed on the planet Jupiter. This event would come to be known as the 2009 Jupiter impact event.
- July 22 – The longest total solar eclipse of the 21st century, lasting up to 6 minutes and 38.86 seconds (0.14 seconds shorter than 6 minutes and 39 seconds), occurs over parts of Asia and the Pacific Ocean.
- July 26 – The Islamic extremist group Boko Haram initiates an uprising in Bauchi State, Nigeria and quickly spreads throughout the northern part of the country.

=== August ===
- August 1 – Former President of the Philippines Corazon Aquino dies at the age of 76 of cardiopulmonary arrest after complications of colon cancer. A memorial service and funeral is scheduled for August 5. (Philippine Daily Inquirer)
- August 3 – Bolivia becomes the first South American country to declare the right of indigenous people to govern themselves.
- August 6 – The metalworkers' union at the Ssangyong Motor plant in Pyeongtaek agrees to end the 77-day strike, after a police raid via helicopters leads to several deaths and arrests.
- August 7 – Typhoon Morakot hits Taiwan, killing 673 and stranding more than 1,000 via the worst flooding on the island in half a century.
- August 8 – A small plane and a tour helicopter collide over the Hudson River in the United States. (CNN)
- August 14 – The United Kingdom imposes direct rule on the Turks and Caicos Islands after an inquiry that found evidence of government corruption.
- August 30 – At least five people are killed and 275 injured in a train crash near Yaoundé, Cameroon. (BBC) (Press TV)

=== September ===
- September 2 – 2009 Andhra Pradesh Chief Minister helicopter crash. A helicopter carrying Y. S. Rajasekhara Reddy went missing in the Nallamala Forest area. It was later confirmed to have crashed with all five people including Reddy pronounced dead.
- September 9 – The Dubai Metro, the first urban train network in the Arabian Peninsula, officials opens.
- September 21 – China becomes the first country to succeed a completed clinical trial by a company for the 2009/H1N1 vaccine in the world during the swine flu pandemic.
- September 22 – WikiLeaks exposes the contents of Kaupthing Bank's internal documents prior to the Icelandic Financial Crisis. These documents showed suspicious amounts of money were loaned to bank owners, and debts being written off.
- September 23 – Korba chimney collapse: At least 45 workers are killed when lightning strikes a chimney under construction in Korba, Chhattisgarh, India, causing it to collapse.
- September 26 – Typhoon Ketsana, PAGASA Name: Ondoy, makes landfall in The Philippines, killing hundreds in Metro Manila and flooding in Huế, Vietnam.
- September 28 – At least 157 demonstrators are massacred by the Guinean military at the Stade du 28 Septembre during a protest against the government that came to power in a coup d'état the previous year.
- September 29 – A 8.1 M_{w} earthquake strikes Samoa, with a maximum Mercalli intensity of VII (Very strong), leaving at least 192 people dead.
- September 30 – A 7.6 M_{w} earthquake strikes Sumatra, Indonesia, with a maximum Mercalli intensity of VIII (Severe), leaving at least 1,115 people dead.

=== October ===
- October 1 – Paleontologists announce the discovery of an Ardipithecus ramidus fossil skeleton, deeming it the oldest remains of a human ancestor yet found.
- October 2
  - Ireland holds a second referendum on the EU's Lisbon Treaty. The amendment is approved by the Irish electorate, having been rejected in the Lisbon I referendum held last year.
  - The International Olympic Committee awards Rio de Janeiro the right to host the 2016 Summer Olympics.
- October 15 – It is revealed the company Trafigura has been using a super-injunction to stop The Guardian from reporting about the 2006 Côte d'Ivoire toxic dumping incident, which Trafigura was responsible for.
- October 18 – British racing driver Jenson Button won his first Formula One World Championship, driving for Brawn GP at the Brazilian Grand Prix.
- October 20
  - Susilo Bambang Yudhoyono is inaugurated for a second term as President of Indonesia.
  - WikiLeaks leaked the membership listing of a radical political group known as the British National Party.
- October 22 – Microsoft releases Windows 7 to all computers and laptops, including an edition for ATMs.
- October 23 – The 2009 Cataño oil refinery fire began after an explosion at the refinery in Bayamón, Puerto Rico.
- October 24 – The 2009 El Ayyat railway accident occurred in Giza, Egypt, when a passenger train derailed due to stoppage of animals on the train tracks. 50 people were killed and 30 people were injured.
- October 25 – Two suicide attacks in Baghdad, Iraq, kill 155 people and injure at least 721 people.

=== November ===
- November 3
  - The Czech Republic becomes the final member-state of the European Union to sign the Treaty of Lisbon, thereby permitting that document's initiation into European law.
  - The Prime Minister of Belgium, Herman Van Rompuy, is designated the first permanent President of the European Council, a position he takes up on December 1, 2009.
- November 5 – Fourteen people are killed during the 2009 Fort Hood shooting.
- November 10 – Call of Duty: Modern Warfare 2 was released.
- November 13 – Having analyzed the data from the LCROSS lunar impact, NASA announces that it has found a "significant" quantity of water in the Moon's Cabeus crater.
- November 23 – In the Philippines, at least 58 people are abducted and killed in the province of Maguindanao, in what the Committee to Protect Journalists called the single deadliest attack on journalists in history.
- November 24 – The Avdhela Project, an Aromanian digital library and cultural initiative, is founded in Bucharest, Romania.

=== December ===
- December 1 – The Treaty of Lisbon comes into force.
- December 5 – Fire at the Lame Horse nightclub in Perm, Russia kills 156 people. The nightclub owner was sentenced to nearly ten years in prison.
- December 7–18 – The UNFCCC's 2009 United Nations Climate Change Conference is held in Copenhagen, Denmark.
- December 8 – A series of attacks in Baghdad, Iraq kill at least 127 people and injure at least 448 more.
- December 15 – First flight of the Boeing 787 Dreamliner.
- December 16 – Astronomers discover GJ 1214 b, the first-known exoplanet on which water could exist.
- December 22 – Serbia applies for membership to the European Union.
- December 25 – A terrorist attempts to bomb Northwest Airlines Flight 253 en route from Amsterdam to Detroit.

== Nobel Prizes ==
The Nobel Prize medallion.

- Chemistry – Ada Yonath, Venkatraman Ramakrishnan, and Thomas A. Steitz
- Economics – Elinor Ostrom and Oliver E. Williamson
- Literature – Herta Müller
- Peace – Barack Obama
- Physics – Charles K. Kao, Willard Boyle, and George E. Smith
- Physiology or Medicine – Elizabeth Blackburn, Carol W. Greider, and Jack W. Szostak

== Bibliography ==
- Berg, Robert J.; Avila, Lixion A. (2011). "Atlantic Hurricane Season of 2009". Monthly Weather Review. 139 (4): 1049–1069. doi:10.1175/2010MWR3476.1. ISSN 0027-0644.
- "Year in World News: 2009". CBS News. December 14, 2009. Archived from the original on January 23, 2026.
- Harbom, Lotta; Wallensteen, Peter (2010). "Armed Conflicts, 1946-2009". Journal of Peace Research. 47 (4): 501–509. doi:10.1177/0022343310376887. ISSN 0022-3433. JSTOR 20752204.
- Lea, Adam; Saunders, Mark (January 21, 2010). Summary of 2009 NW Pacific Typhoon Season and Verification of Authors' Seasonal Forecasts (PDF). Tropical Storm Risk (Report). University College London. Archived (PDF) from the original on June 17, 2025.
- Annual 2009 Global Climate Report (Report). National Oceanic and Atmospheric Administration. 2009. Archived from the original on August 12, 2025.
- World Population Prospects 2024 (Report). United Nations Department of Economic and Social Affairs. 2024. Archived from the original on October 27, 2025.
- World Economic Situation and Prospects 2010 (PDF) (Report). World Economic Situation and Prospects (WESP). United Nations Department of Economic and Social Affairs. 2010. doi:10.18356/abf233a2-en. ISBN 9789210557429.
- 2009 Global Trends (Report). United Nations High Commissioner for Refugees. 2010.
