= 2010 Jupiter impact event =

Impact event

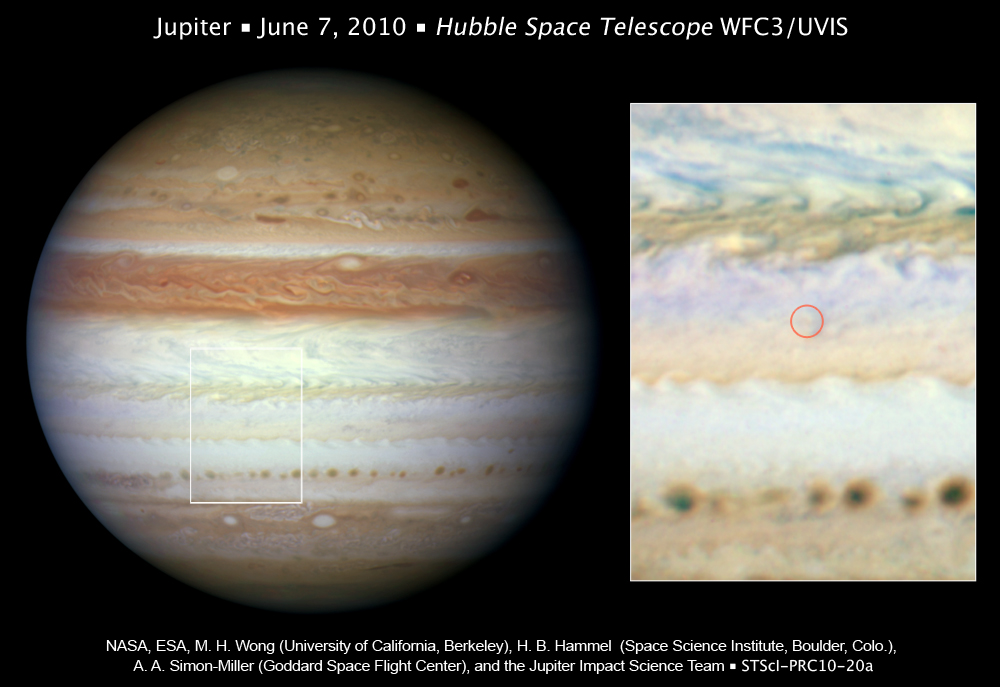
- Observations made by NASA's Hubble Space Telescope
- Date: 3 June 2010
- Location: Jupiter

On June 3, 2010, a bolide impact event occurred on Jupiter by an object estimated to be about 8–13 metres (26–43 ft) in diameter. The impactor may have been an asteroid, comet, centaur, extinct comet, or temporary satellite capture.

== Observation ==
2010 Jupiter impact event

The impact happened 3 June 2010, and was recorded and first reported by amateur astronomer Anthony Wesley from Australia. The event was confirmed by Christopher Go at the Philippines, who recorded the event and released a video. Wesley is the same person who had been first to report the 2009 Jupiter impact event.

The observed flash lasted about two seconds. It was located in the South Equatorial Belt, about fifty degrees from the central meridian. The June 2010 superbolide impactor probably measured between 8 and 13 metres (26 and 43 ft) across, with a mass between 500 and 2,000 tonnes (490 and 1,970 long tons; 550 and 2,200 short tons). Jupiter probably gets hit by several objects of this size each year.

On 20 August 2010 UT, yet another flash event was detected on Jupiter. As of 23 August two other observers had recorded the same event.

== See also ==
- Impact events on Jupiter
- List of Jupiter events
