= Ko Arimatsu =

Japanese astronomer (born 1987)

- 有松 亘
- Born: 1987 (age 38–39); Gunma Prefecture, Japan
- Education: University of Tokyo: Graduate School of Science (MS, PhD); Faculty of Science (BS)
- Scientific career
- Fields: Planetary science; Astronomy
- Workplaces: National Astronomical Observatory of Japan: Ishigakijima Astronomical Observatory; Astronomical Information Center
- Thesis: A study on extrasolar cometary source populations with the AKARI far-infrared all-sky survey (2015)
- Website: arimatsuko.com

Ko Arimatsu (Japanese: 有松 亘, Hepburn: Arimatsu Kō; born 1987) is a Japanese astronomer working at Ishigakijima Astronomical Observatory of the National Astronomical Observatory of Japan. He specializes in taking video observations of stellar occultations and planetary impacts by small Solar System bodies. His research involves making use of small, low-cost telescopes built from commercially available equipment, which has resulted in scientific discoveries including an asteroid impact on Jupiter, a kilometre-sized Kuiper belt object, and an atmosphere around the small object (612533) 2002 XV93. He engages in astronomy outreach for the public, providing lectures, illustrations, and commentary about his research for newspapers, magazines and television programs.

== Early life and education ==
Arimatsu was born in Gunma Prefecture in 1987. At an early age, he became interested in astronomy and tinkered with telescopes for stargazing when he was in junior high school. He attended Gunma Prefectural Maebashi High School and graduated in March 2006. From April 2006 to March 2010, he studied as an undergraduate at the astronomy department of University of Tokyo's Faculty of Science. He continued his study of astronomy at University of Tokyo's Graduate School of Science in April 2010, where he worked on analyzing infrared astronomical data from the AKARI satellite. He obtained his master's degree in March 2012 and then his doctorate in March 2015.

== Career ==
From April 2015 to March 2018, Arimatsu worked as a postdoctoral researcher for the National Astronomical Observatory of Japan's (NAOJ's) Astronomical Information Center and Japan Society for the Promotion of Science. He moved to Kyoto University's Graduate School of Science in September 2018, where he worked as a researcher for the Astronomical Observatory until December 2020. From January 2021 to November 2025, he worked as a program-specific assistant professor for Kyoto University's Hakubi Center for Advanced Research.

As of December 2025, Arimatsu works as a lecturer for NAOJ's Astronomical Information Center and director of NAOJ's Ishigakijima Astronomical Observatory. He engages in astronomy outreach for the public, providing illustrations, photographs, and commentary about his research for newspapers, magazines and television programs. Outside of research, he supervises books related to astronomy, such as the novel Ōruri Ryūsei-gun (オオルリ流星群; lit. 'Blue-and-White Flycatcher Meteor Shower') by Naoki Prize-winning author Shin Iyohara in 2022. The novel's story was inspired by Arimatsu's OASES project and its 2019 discovery of a Kuiper belt object. Arimatsu also supervised the Japanese translation of Anita Ganeri's children's book Through the Night Sky (Oyasumi no ato de (おやすみのあとで; lit. 'After Goodnight')), which was published in 2025.

=== Research ===
==== Low-cost projects ====
Ko Arimatsu specializes in taking video observations of stellar occultations and planetary impacts by small Solar System bodies. He led three projects dedicated to observing these astronomical phenomena: the Organized Autotelescopes for Serendipitous Event Survey (OASES), the Planetary ObservatioN Camera for Optical Transient Surveys (PONCOTS), and the Trans-neptunian Atmospheres and Belts Analysis through Stellar-occultation Coordinated Observations (TABASCO). All projects primarily made use of small telescopes equipped with high-speed video cameras, which are assembled from low-cost and commercially available equipment. By using low-cost equipment, Arimatsu aims to make scientific discoveries accessible to amateur astronomers.

Arimatsu's first project, OASES, began in 2015 with the aim of observing serendipitous stellar occultations by unseen small Solar System bodies. OASES particularly sought after small objects in the Kuiper belt and Oort cloud, which are too faint to be seen directly by telescopes but could be detected through stellar occultations. The development budget of OASES was 3.5 million yen (~US$32,000 in 2019), which was less than 0.3% of the typical budget of competing international projects like the Taiwanese–American Occultation Survey. Using two 28 cm (11 in) telescopes on the rooftop of the Miyako open-air school in Miyako Island, Okinawa Prefecture, the OASES project detected its first occultation by a kilometre-sized Kuiper belt object on 28 June 2016. The discovery was announced in a Nature Astronomy paper published by Arimatsu as the lead author in January 2019. In 2024, the OASES project received upgrades to its camera system and increased its number of telescopes to four.

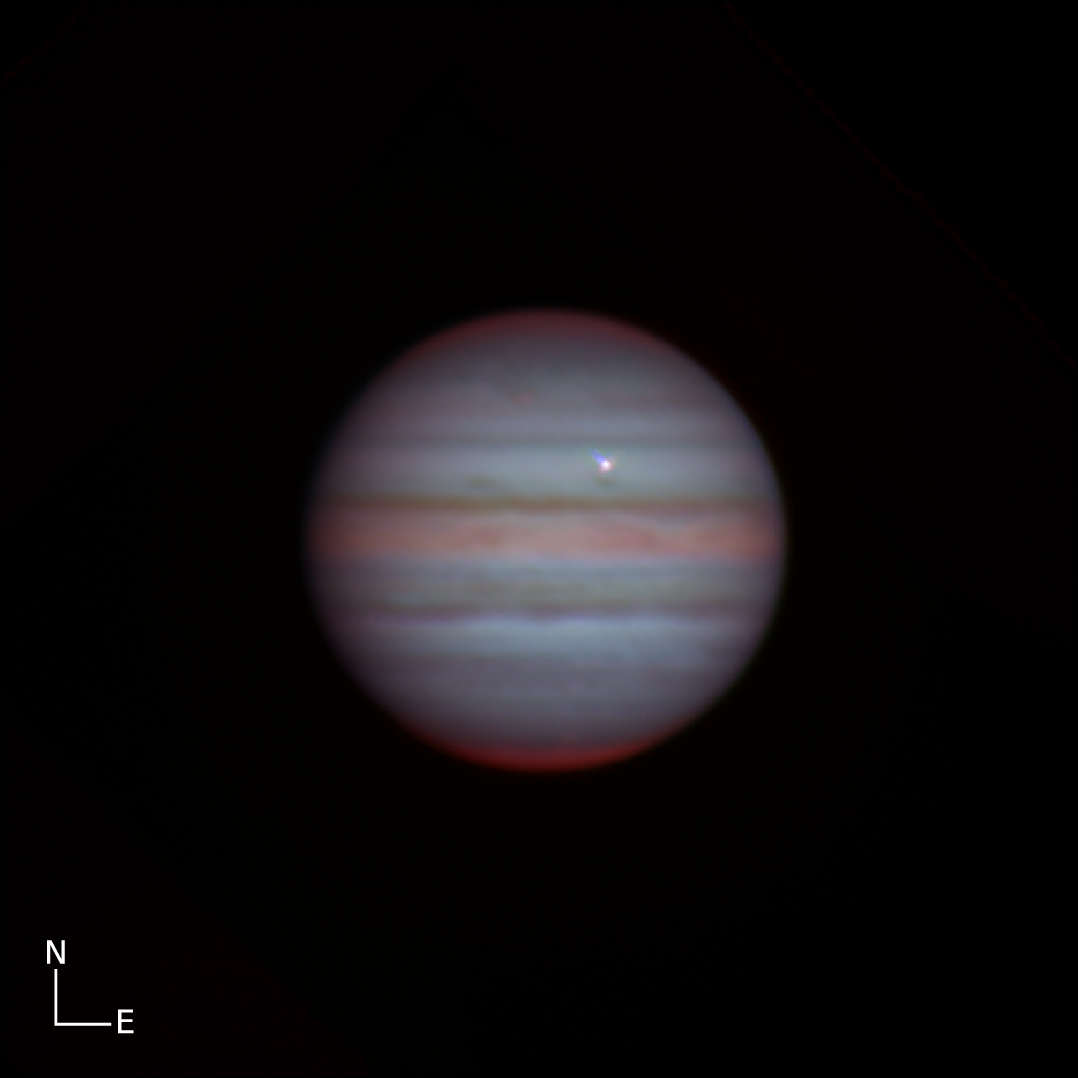
Arimatsu's PONCOTS project captured this color photo of an asteroid impacting Jupiter (visible as a bright spot) on 15 October 2021 13:24:13 UTC.

Arimatsu's second project, PONCOTS, operated similarly to OASES, but had the goal of taking color video observations of asteroid impacts on other planets. PONCOTS began as a spin-off of OASES in the summer of 2021, during the COVID-19 pandemic. In a 2022 interview with the Niigata Sogo Television, Arimatsu stated that he started PONCOTS because he was bored and had lots of free time. The pandemic prevented him from travelling to remote locations for observing, so he assembled his own 28-cm telescope from commercially available equipment at a total cost of about 1.4 million yen. Using his homemade telescope at Kyoto University's Yoshida Campus, Arimatsu achieved the first color recording of an asteroid impact on Jupiter on 15 October 2021. He and his colleagues announced the discovery in a paper published in The Astrophysical Journal Letters in June 2022, and at the Astronomical Society of Japan's 2022 Autumn Meeting in September. In a Kyoto University press release on the discovery, Arimatsu remarked that the methodology of PONCOTS was no different from what he did back when he was observing Jupiter in junior high, which made him regret not discovering an impact sooner.

Arimatsu's latest project, TABASCO, began in 2023 with the goal of characterizing known trans-Neptunian objects through planned observations of stellar occultations. The project employs a network of meter- to sub-meter-sized telescopes stationed across Japan. TABASCO achieved its first successful detection of an occultation by (612533) 2002 XV93 on 10 January 2024. The observations revealed that 2002 XV_{93} had a thin atmosphere, a property once thought to be impossible due to the object's small size. Arimatsu and colleagues announced the discovery of 2002 XV_{93}'s atmosphere in a Nature Astronomy paper published in May 2026. TABASCO has also detected occultations by (26375) 1999 DE9 on 9 March 2024 and by 55565 Aya on 10 May 2024, the occultation results of Aya were published on 13 October 2026.

==== Other activities ====
Outside of his main projects and graduate studies, Arimatsu has participated in other types of astronomical research, mostly relating to occultations. Arimatsu has been involved in scientific publications relating to Kiso Observatory's Tomo-e Gozen camera system since 2016. During 2019, Arimatsu led occultation studies on the atmospheres of dwarf planets Pluto and Quaoar for the European Research Council's Lucky Star project. In 2023, Arimatsu coordinated a campaign involving amateur astronomers to observe a stellar occultation by asteroid 98943 Torifune, in preparation for its exploration by JAXA's Hayabusa2 mission. In 2026, Arimatsu collaborated with Kohji Tsumura on analyzing the Sun's F-corona in public solar eclipse imagery from NASA's Artemis II mission, demonstrating the ability to produce scientific results without specialized observational equipment.

== Awards ==
On 11 June 2021, the International Astronomical Union named the main-belt asteroid 27590 Koarimatsu in recognition of his work on the OASES project.

== Selected publications ==
Notable first-author publications by Ko Arimatsu include:

- Arimatsu, Ko; Yoshida, Fumi; Hayamizu, Tsutomu; et al. (May 2026). "Detection of an atmosphere on a trans-Neptunian object beyond Pluto". Nature Astronomy. 10 (7): 980–987. arXiv:2605.02243. Bibcode:2026NatAs..10..980A. doi:10.1038/s41550-026-02846-1.
- Arimatsu, Ko; Yoshida, Fumi; Hayamizu, Tsutomu; et al. (October 2024). "Diffraction modelling of a 2023 March 5 stellar occultation by subkilometer-sized asteroid (98943) 2001 CC21". Publications of the Astronomical Society of Japan. 76 (5): 940–949. arXiv:2407.19836. Bibcode:2024PASJ...76..940A. doi:10.1093/pasj/psae060.
- Arimatsu, Ko; Tsumura, Kohji; Usui, Fumihiko; Watanabe, Jun-ichi (June 2022). "Detection of an Extremely Large Impact Flash on Jupiter by High-cadence Multiwavelength Observations". The Astrophysical Journal Letters. 933 (1): L5. arXiv:2206.01050. Bibcode:2022ApJ...933L...5A. doi:10.3847/2041-8213/ac7573.
- Arimatsu, K.; Hashimoto, G. L.; Kagitani, M.; et al. (June 2020). "Evidence for a rapid decrease of Pluto's atmospheric pressure revealed by a stellar occultation in 2019". Astronomy & Astrophysics. 638: L5. arXiv:2005.09189. Bibcode:2020A&A...638L...5A. doi:10.1051/0004-6361/202037762.
- Arimatsu, Ko; Ohsawa, Ryou; Hashimoto, George L.; et al. (December 2019). "New Constraint on the Atmosphere of (50000) Quaoar from a Stellar Occultation". The Astronomical Journal. 158 (6): 236. arXiv:1910.09988. Bibcode:2019AJ....158..236A. doi:10.3847/1538-3881/ab5058.
- Arimatsu, K.; Tsumura, K.; Usui, F.; et al. (January 2019). "A kilometre-sized Kuiper belt object discovered by stellar occultation using amateur telescopes". Nature Astronomy. 3 (4): 301–306. arXiv:1910.09994. Bibcode:2019NatAs...3..301A. doi:10.1038/s41550-018-0685-8.
- Arimatsu, Ko; Tsumura, Kohji; Ichikawa, Kohei; et al. (July 2017). "Organized Autotelescopes for Serendipitous Event Survey (OASES): Design and performance". Publications of the Astronomical Society of Japan. 69 (4) 68. arXiv:1706.00012. Bibcode:2017PASJ...69...68A. doi:10.1093/pasj/psx048.
