= 2009 Jupiter impact event =

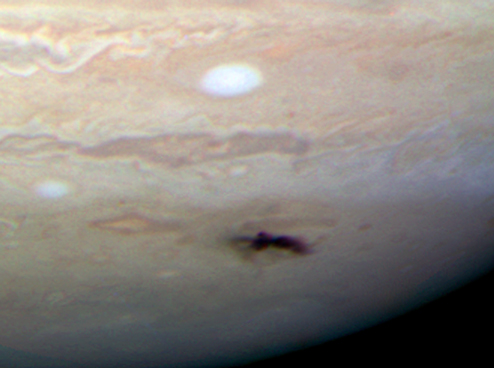
- Hubble image of the scar taken on July 23 showing a blemish of about 8,000 kilometres (5,000 mi) long
- Date: July 19, 2009
- Location: Jupiter

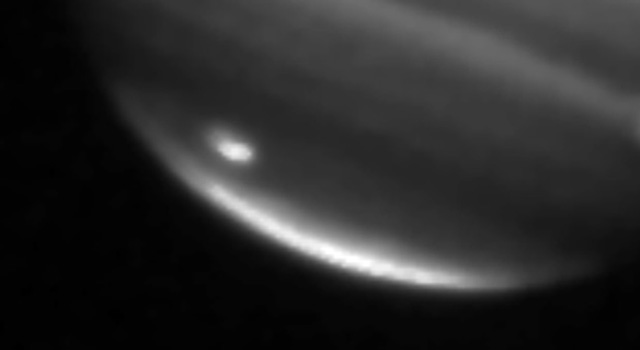
A picture of the 2009 impact mark captured by NASA Infrared Telescope Facility in Mauna Kea, Hawaii

On July 19, 2009, an impact event occurred on Jupiter, causing a black spot in the planet's atmosphere. The impact area covered 190 million square kilometers, similar in area to the planet's Little Red Spot and approximately the size of the Pacific Ocean. The impactor is estimated to have been about 200 to 500 meters in diameter. For comparison, the one for the Tunguska event was estimated to be in the 60–190 meters range.

== Discovery ==
Amateur astronomer Anthony Wesley discovered the impact at approximately 13:30 UTC on 19 July 2009 (exactly 15 years after the Jupiter impacts of comet Shoemaker–Levy 9, or SL9). He was at his home observatory just outside Murrumbateman, New South Wales, Australia, using stacked images on a 14.5-inch (36.8 cm) diameter reflecting telescope equipped with a low light machine vision video camera attached to the telescope. Wesley stated that:

When first seen close to the limb (and in poor conditions) it was only a vaguely dark spot, I [thought] likely to be just a normal dark polar storm. However as it rotated further into view, and the conditions improved I suddenly realised that it wasn't just dark, it was black in all channels, meaning it was truly a black spot.

Wesley sent an e-mail to others including the NASA Jet Propulsion Laboratory in Pasadena, California reporting his observations.

== Findings ==
Paul Kalas and collaborators confirmed the sighting. They had time on the Keck II telescope in Hawaii, and had been planning to observe Fomalhaut b, but they spent some of their time looking at the Jupiter impact. Infrared observation by Keck and the NASA Infrared Telescope Facility (IRTF) at Mauna Kea showed a bright spot where the impact took place, indicating the impact warmed a 190 million square km area of the lower atmosphere at 305° west, 57° south near Jupiter's south pole.

The spot's prominence indicated that it was composed of high-altitude aerosols similar to those seen during the SL9 impact. Using near-infrared wavelengths and the IRTF, Glenn Orton and his team detected bright upwelling particles in the planet's upper atmosphere and using mid-infrared wavelengths, found possible extra emission of ammonia gas.

The force of the explosion on Jupiter was thousands of times more powerful than the suspected comet or asteroid that exploded over the Tunguska River Valley in Siberia in June 1908. This would be approximately 12,500–13,000 megatons of TNT, over a million times more powerful than the Hiroshima bomb.

== Impactor ==
The object that hit Jupiter was not identified before Wesley discovered the impact. A 2003 paper estimated comets with a diameter larger than 1.5 kilometers impact Jupiter about every 90 to 500 years, while a 1997 survey suggested that the astronomer Cassini may have recorded an impact in 1690.

Given the size of the SL9 impactors, it is likely that this object was less than one kilometer in diameter. Finding water at the site would indicate that the impactor was a comet, as opposed to an asteroid or a very small, icy moon. At first it was believed that the object was more likely to be a comet since comets generally have more planet-crossing orbits. At the distance of Jupiter (5.2 AU) most small comets are not close enough to the Sun to be very active, and so would be hard to detect. Small kilometer-sized asteroids would also be hard to detect, however, and recent work by Orton et al. and Hammel et al. has strongly suggested the impactor was an asteroid, as it left only one impact site, did not reduce Jovian decametric radiation emission by contributing significant dust to the Jovian magnetosphere, and produced high altitude dusty debris full of silica, very different than what was produced by SL9.

As of 2012, the impactor is believed to have been an asteroid with a diameter of about 200 to 500 meters.

=== Visibility ===
Assuming it was an inactive comet (or asteroid) about 1 km in diameter, this object would have been no brighter than about apparent magnitude 25. (Jupiter shines about 130 billion times brighter than a 25th magnitude object.) Most asteroid surveys that use a wide field of view do not see fainter than about magnitude 22 (which is 16x brighter than magnitude 25). Even detecting satellites less than 10 km in diameter orbiting Jupiter is difficult and requires some of the best telescopes in the world. It is only since 1999 with the discovery of Callirrhoe that astronomers have been able to discover many of Jupiter's smallest moons.

== See also ==
- 2009 in spaceflight
- 2009 Sulawesi superbolide
- 2010 Jupiter impact event
- Impact events on Jupiter
- List of Jupiter events
