= Anthony Wesley =

Australian amateur astronomer

Anthony Wesley (born 1965 or 1966) is an Australian computer programmer and amateur astronomer, known for his discoveries of the 2009 and 2010 Jupiter impact events.

== Background ==
Wesley was born in Glen Innes, Australia in 1965. At as early as ten years old, he was given a small telescope, which sparked his interest in stargazing. By 2003, Wesley had become involved in planetary photography. Over time his work became more focused on Jupiter, leading to his discoveries of the 2009 and 2010 impact events. Prior to these discoveries, scientists did not believe impacts of this relatively small size could be observed from Earth. Wesleys' work also brought to light the vital role amateur astronomers play in space discovery.

== Impact discoveries ==
=== 2009 ===
On 19 July 2009 at approximately 13:30, Wesley found fame after discovering a scar near Jupiter's South Pole the size of the Pacific Ocean. Wesley discovered the impact at approximately 13:30 UTC on On 19 July 2009 (almost exactly 15 years after the Jupiter impact of comet Shoemaker-Levy 9, or SL9), Wesley discovered an impact on Jupiter that caused a black spot in the planet's atmosphere. He was at his home observatory just outside Murrumbateman, New South Wales, Australia, using stacked images on a 36.8-centimetre (14.5 in) diameter reflecting telescope equipped with a low light machine vision video camera attached to the telescope.

=== 2010 ===
On 3 June 2010, Wesley was away from his home visiting a friend, when with a 37-centimetre (15 in) telescope he took an image of a small celestial object burning up inJupiter's atmosphere. The observed flash lasted about two seconds. The object was believed to be an asteroid, making it the first image of a meteorite hitting a planet.

The find was praised by NASA and fellow astronomers, who were under the impression that after the 1994 collision another would not be expected for several hundred years.
