= Jupiter's South Pole =

Coordinates: 90°S 0°W

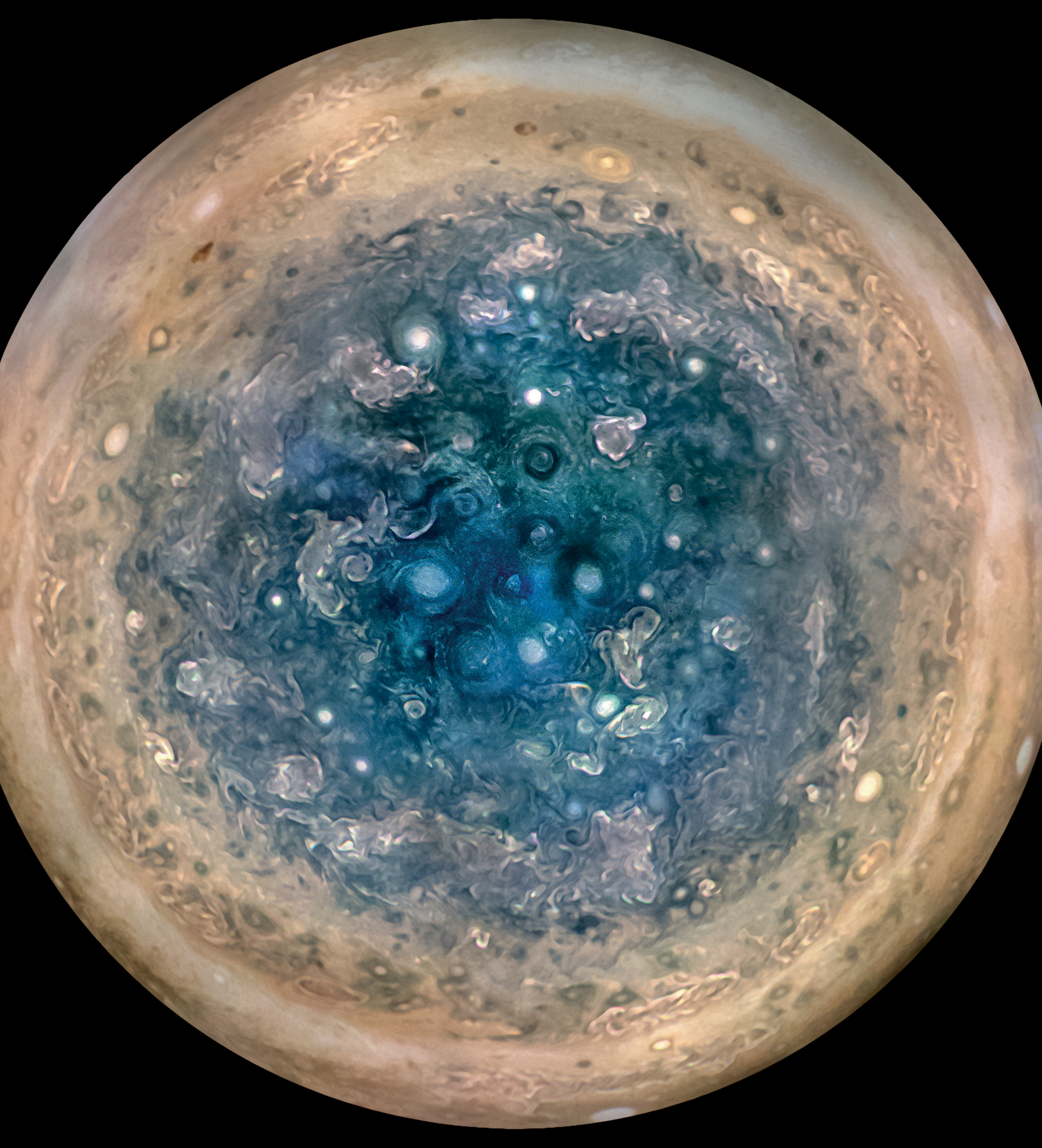
Photo of Jupiter's South Pole taken by the JunoCam on May 25, 2017

The South Pole of Jupiter was first photographed in detail by the Juno spacecraft, which arrived at Jupiter in July 2016 and entered a polar orbit. In the images it returned, six cyclones were discovered at the planet's South Pole. Five of the polar cyclones encircle a center vortex. Additionally, in 2007 and 2016, data collected by X-ray telescopes orbiting Earth suggested Jupiter's South Pole has an aurora. This is attributed to Jupiter having a strong magnetic field, which causes the aurora to form an ovular shape, known as the Southern Auroral Oval. Using UV instruments, researchers have been able to observe reflected sunlight, from which they have identified an increase in acetylene (C2H2) absorptions in Jupiter's Southern Auroral Oval.

== History of exploration ==
The earliest missions to observe Jupiter closely were Pioneer 10 and Pioneer 11. In 1973, Pioneer 10, at its closest, passed Jupiter at a distance of 81,000 miles, which captured images and collected infrared readings of the planet's atmosphere. In 1974, Pioneer 11 flew within 26,400 miles from the planets surface, solely capturing images of the planets surface. Later missions, being that of Voyager 1 and Voyager 2, prioritized observation of Jupiter's ring and its moons. After the implementation of orbital planetary exploration, the only probe that had orbited Jupiter, besides Juno, was Galileo, from 1995 to 2003; however, its orbital inclination made it impossible to observe the polar regions of Jupiter; Cassini, a non-orbital spacecraft, flew past Jupiter in 2000, and had no opportunity to photograph the polar regions. Thus, they remained largely unknown until the observations during the Juno mission in 2016 (the images of the previous flyby missions and Earth telescopes had low resolution); however, in 2000, the polar X-ray spots of Jupiter (the southern one is significantly weaker than the northern one) were detected.

== Polar cyclones ==
The cyclones found near Jupiter's South Pole have an average diameter of 5,000 km, each of them having wind speeds up to 100 m/s (360 kph). The Juno Spacecraft was able to identify polygonial patterns for the layout of the cyclones. The center vertices located closest to the South Pole is surrounded by five cyclones, each relatively equidistant from each other and the center vortex. This generally forms a shape similar to that of a pentagon. The central polar cyclone forces the surrounding cyclones away from itself, allowing for the cluster of storms to remain stable since their first observation 10 years ago. This stability is a balance between the attraction of the exterior vortices to the Pole and the forces of the central cyclone pushing them away. The rotational motion of these cyclones generally follows a two-dimensional turbulent regime, in that the turbulence moves across the surface completely, rather than up and down. The energy and wind directions of the cyclones are rapid rotational atmospheres that behave similar to that of thin, churning layers of liquid.

== Magnetic field ==
Aurorae on Jupiter's South Pole, as viewed by the Hubble Space Telescope

Jupiter has a strong magnetic field, which is nearly 20,000 times that of the strength of Earth's magnetic field, which causes an intense and consistent aurora to occur near both of Jupiter's poles. This generates auroral emissions, resulting in distortion that creates an ovular shape surrounding the planet's South Pole. This is known as the Southern Auroral Oval and it increases the amount of acetylene (C2H2) that is absorbed within the generalized location. In addition to acetylene absorption, the aurora generates atmospheric heating that is localized to the Auroral Oval. It is believed this is due to a spike in charged particles, resulting in ion-neutral and electron recombination reactions.
