= Comet Shoemaker–Levy 9 =

Comet that collided with Jupiter

D/1993 F2 (Shoemaker–Levy)
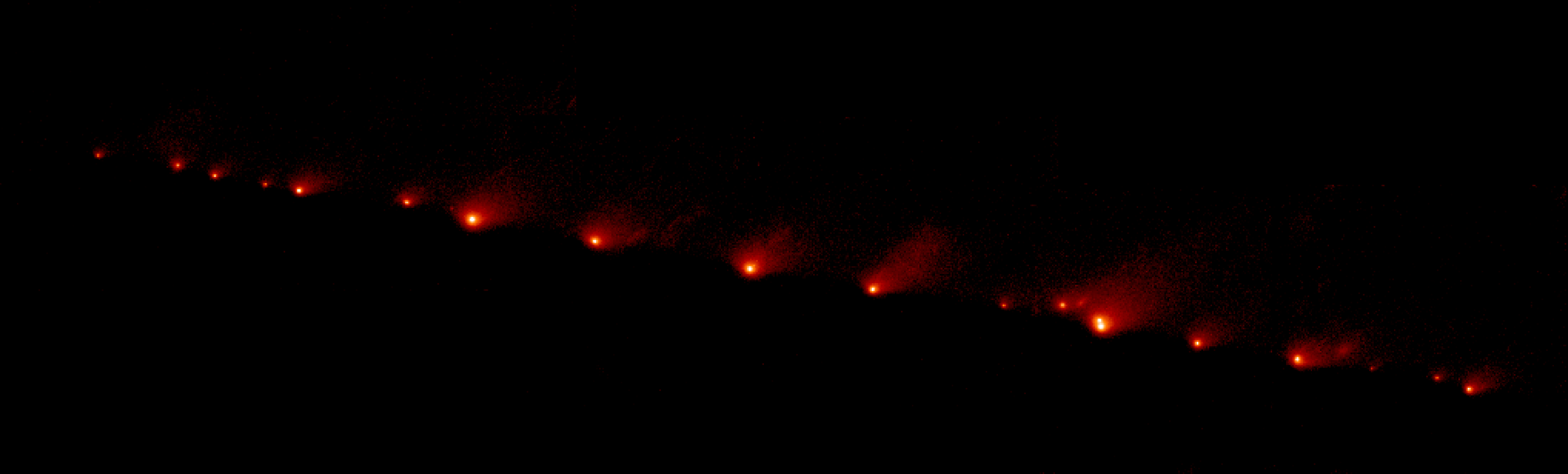
- Shoemaker–Levy 9, disrupted comet on a collision course (total of 21 fragments, taken in July 1994)

Discovery
- Discovered by: Carolyn Shoemaker; Eugene Shoemaker; David Levy
- Discovery site: Palomar Observatory
- Discovery date: March 24, 1993

Orbital characteristics
- Inclination: 94.2°

Physical characteristics
- Dimensions: 1.8 km (1.1 mi)

Comet Shoemaker–Levy 9 (formally designated D/1993 F2) was a comet that broke apart in July 1992 and collided with Jupiter in July 1994, providing the first direct observation of an extraterrestrial collision of Solar System objects. This generated a large amount of coverage in the popular media, and the comet was closely observed by astronomers worldwide. The collision provided new information about Jupiter and highlighted its possible role in reducing space debris in the inner Solar System.

The comet was discovered by astronomers Carolyn and Eugene M. Shoemaker, and David Levy in 1993. Shoemaker–Levy 9 (SL9) had been captured by Jupiter and was orbiting the planet at the time. It was located on the night of March 24 in two photographs taken with the 46 cm (18 in) Schmidt telescope at the Palomar Observatory in California. It was the first active comet observed to be orbiting a planet, and had probably been captured by Jupiter around 20 to 30 years earlier.

Calculations showed that its unusual fragmented form was due to a previous closer approach to Jupiter in July 1992. At that time, the orbit of Shoemaker–Levy 9 passed within Jupiter's Roche limit, and Jupiter's tidal forces had acted to pull the comet apart. The comet was later observed as a series of fragments ranging up to 2 km (1.2 mi) in diameter. These fragments collided with Jupiter's southern hemisphere between July 16 and 22, 1994 at a speed of approximately 60 km/s (37 mi/s) (Jupiter's escape velocity) or 216,000 km/h (134,000 mph). The prominent scars from the impacts were more visible than the Great Red Spot and persisted for many months.

== Discovery ==
While conducting a program of observations designed to uncover near-Earth objects, the Shoemakers and Levy discovered Comet Shoemaker–Levy 9 on the night of March 24, 1993, in two photographs taken with the 46 cm (1.51 ft) Schmidt telescope at the Palomar Observatory in California. The comet was thus a serendipitous discovery, but one that quickly overshadowed the results from their main observing program.

Comet Shoemaker–Levy 9 was the ninth periodic comet (a comet whose orbital period is 200 years or less) discovered by Shoemaker and Levy, thence its name. It was their eleventh comet discovery overall including their discovery of two non-periodic comets, which use a different nomenclature. The discovery was announced in IAU Circular 5725 on March 26, 1993.

The discovery image gave the first hint that comet Shoemaker–Levy 9 was an unusual comet, as it appeared to show multiple nuclei in an elongated region about 50 arcseconds long and 10 arcseconds wide. Brian G. Marsden of the Central Bureau for Astronomical Telegrams noted that the comet lay only about 4 degrees from Jupiter as seen from Earth, and that although this could be a line-of-sight effect, its apparent motion in the sky suggested that the comet was physically close to the planet.

== Comet with a Jovian orbit ==
Orbital studies of the new comet soon revealed that it was orbiting Jupiter rather than the Sun, unlike any other comet then known. Its orbit around Jupiter was very loosely bound, with a period of about 2 years and an apoapsis (the point in the orbit farthest from the planet) of 0.33 astronomical units (49 million kilometres; 31 million miles). Its orbit around the planet was highly eccentric (e = 0.9986).

Tracing back the comet's orbital motion revealed that it had been orbiting Jupiter for some time. It is likely that it was captured from a solar orbit in the early 1970s, although the capture may have occurred as early as the mid-1960s. Several other observers found images of the comet in precovery images obtained before March 24, including Kin Endate from a photograph exposed on March 15, Satoru Otomo on March 17, and a team led by Eleanor Helin from images on March 19. An image of the comet on a Schmidt photographic plate taken on March 19 was identified on March 21 by M. Lindgren, in a project searching for comets near Jupiter. However, as his team were expecting comets to be inactive or at best exhibit a weak dust coma, and SL9 had a peculiar morphology, its true nature was not recognised until the official announcement 5 days later. No precovery images dating back to earlier than March 1993 have been found. Before the comet was captured by Jupiter, it was probably a short-period comet with an aphelion just inside Jupiter's orbit, and a perihelion interior to the asteroid belt.

The volume of space within which an object can be said to orbit Jupiter is defined by Jupiter's Hill sphere. When the comet passed Jupiter in the late 1960s or early 1970s, it happened to be near its aphelion, and found itself slightly within Jupiter's Hill sphere. Jupiter's gravity nudged the comet towards it. Because the comet's motion with respect to Jupiter was very small, it fell almost straight toward Jupiter, which is why it ended up on a Jove-centric orbit of very high eccentricity—that is to say, the ellipse was nearly flattened out.

The comet had apparently passed extremely close to Jupiter on July 7, 1992, just over 40,000 km (25,000 mi) above its cloud tops—a smaller distance than Jupiter's radius of 70,000 km (43,000 mi), and well within the orbit of Jupiter's innermost moon Metis and the planet's Roche limit, inside which tidal forces are strong enough to disrupt a body held together only by gravity. Although the comet had approached Jupiter closely before, the July 7 encounter seemed to be by far the closest, and the fragmentation of the comet is thought to have occurred at this time. Each fragment of the comet was denoted by a letter of the alphabet, from "fragment A" through to "fragment W", a practice already established from previously observed fragmented comets.

More exciting for planetary astronomers was that the best orbital calculations suggested that the comet would pass within 45,000 km (28,000 mi) of the center of Jupiter, a distance smaller than the planet's radius, meaning that there was an extremely high probability that SL9 would collide with Jupiter in July 1994. Studies suggested that the train of nuclei would plow into Jupiter's atmosphere over a period of about five days.

== Predictions for the collision ==
The discovery that the comet was likely to collide with Jupiter caused great excitement within the astronomical community and beyond, as astronomers had never before seen two significant Solar System bodies collide. Intense studies of the comet were undertaken, and as its orbit became more accurately established, the possibility of a collision became a certainty. The collision would provide a unique opportunity for scientists to look inside Jupiter's atmosphere, as the collisions were expected to cause eruptions of material from the layers normally hidden beneath the clouds.

Astronomers estimated that the visible fragments of SL9 ranged in size from a few hundred metres (around 1,000 ft) to two kilometres (1.2 mi) across, suggesting that the original comet may have had a nucleus up to 5 km (3.1 mi) across—somewhat larger than Comet Hyakutake, which became very bright when it passed close to the Earth in 1996. One of the great debates in advance of the impact was whether the effects of the impact of such small bodies would be noticeable from Earth, apart from a flash as they disintegrated like giant meteors. The most optimistic prediction was that large, asymmetric ballistic fireballs would rise above the limb of Jupiter and into sunlight to be visible from Earth. Other suggested effects of the impacts were seismic waves travelling across the planet, an increase in stratospheric haze on the planet due to dust from the impacts, and an increase in the mass of the Jovian ring system. However, given that observing such a collision was completely unprecedented, astronomers were cautious with their predictions of what the event might reveal.

== Impacts ==
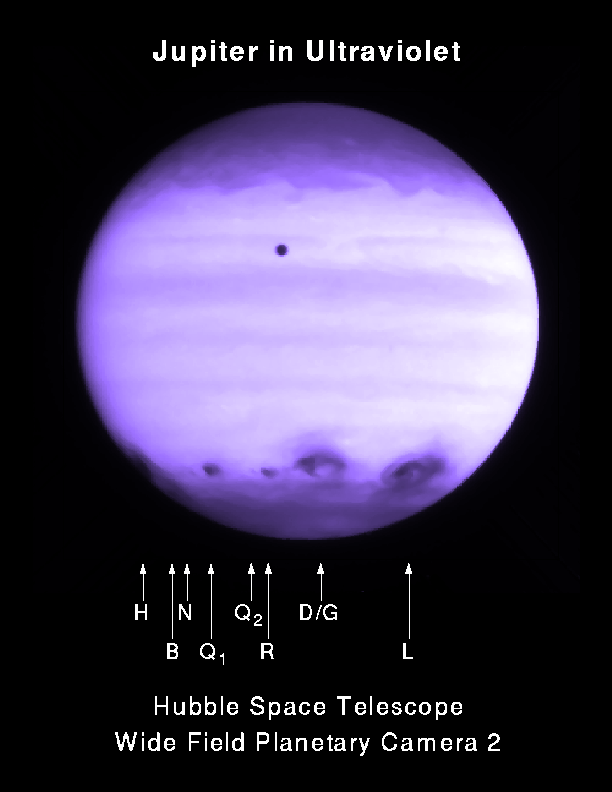
Jupiter in ultraviolet (about 2.5 hours after R's impact). The black dot near the top is Io transiting Jupiter.

Anticipation grew as the predicted date for the collisions approached, and astronomers trained terrestrial telescopes on Jupiter. Several space observatories did the same, including the Hubble Space Telescope, the ROSAT X-ray-observing satellite, the W. M. Keck Observatory, and the Galileo spacecraft, then on its way to a rendezvous with Jupiter scheduled for 1995. Although the impacts took place on the side of Jupiter hidden from Earth, Galileo, then at a distance of 1.6 AU (240 million km; 150 million mi) from the planet, was able to see the impacts as they occurred. Jupiter's rapid rotation brought the impact sites into view for terrestrial observers a few minutes after the collisions.

Two other space probes made observations at the time of the impact: the Ulysses spacecraft, primarily designed for solar observations, was pointed toward Jupiter from its location 2.6 AU (390 million km; 240 million mi) away, and the distant Voyager 2 probe, some 44 AU (6.6 billion km; 4.1 billion mi) from Jupiter and on its way out of the Solar System following its encounter with Neptune in 1989, was programmed to look for radio emission in the 1–390 kHz range and make observations with its ultraviolet spectrometer.

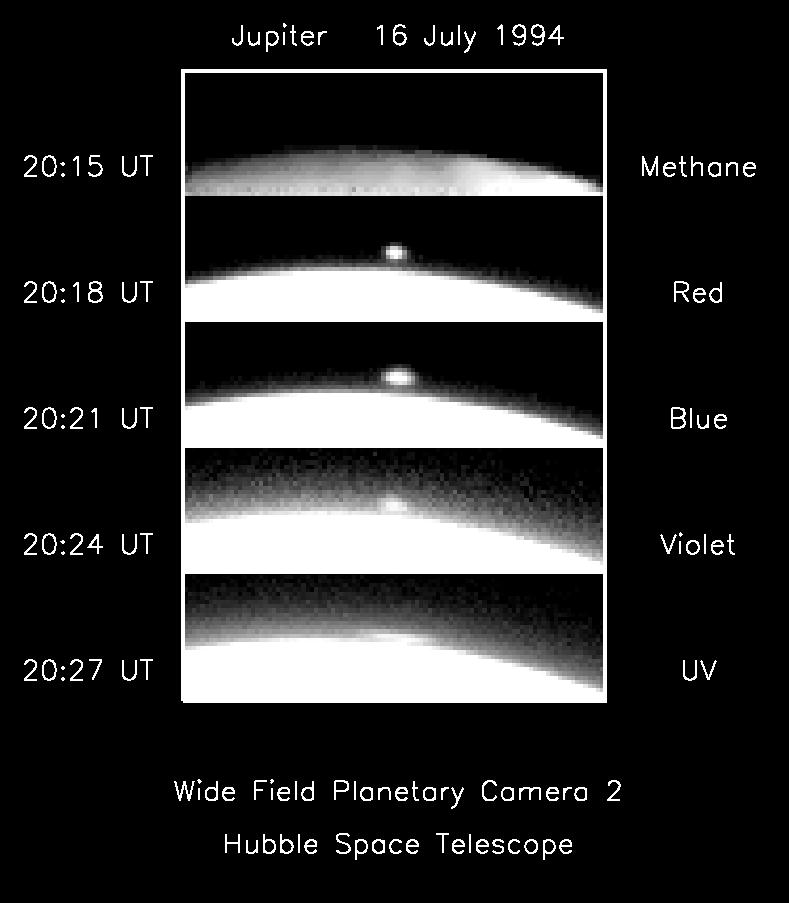
Hubble Space Telescope images of a fireball from the first impact appearing over the limb of the planet

Animation of Shoemaker–Levy 9's orbit around Jupiter Jupiter · Fragment A · Fragment D · Fragment G · Fragment N · Fragment W

Astronomer Ian Morison described the impacts as following:

The first impact occurred at 20:13 UTC on July 16, 1994, when fragment A of the [comet's] nucleus slammed into Jupiter's southern hemisphere at about 60 km/s (35 mi/s). Instruments on Galileo detected a fireball that reached a peak temperature of about 24,000 K (23,700 °C; 42,700 °F), compared to the typical Jovian cloud-top temperature of about 130 K (−143 °C; −226 °F). It then expanded and cooled rapidly to about 1,500 K (1,230 °C; 2,240 °F). The plume from the fireball quickly reached a height of over 3,000 km (1,900 mi) and was observed by the HST.

A few minutes after the impact fireball was detected, Galileo measured renewed heating, probably due to ejected material falling back onto the planet. Earth-based observers detected the fireball rising over the limb of the planet shortly after the initial impact.

Despite published predictions, astronomers had not expected to see the fireballs from the impacts and did not have any idea how visible the other atmospheric effects of the impacts would be from Earth. Observers soon saw a huge dark spot after the first impact; the spot was visible from Earth. This and subsequent dark spots were thought to have been caused by debris from the impacts, and were markedly asymmetric, forming crescent shapes in front of the direction of impact.

Over the next six days, 21 distinct impacts were observed, with the largest coming on July 18 at 07:33 UTC when fragment G struck Jupiter. This impact created a giant dark spot over 12,000 km or 7,500 mi (almost one Earth diameter) across, and was estimated to have released an energy equivalent to 6 million megatons of TNT (600 times the world's nuclear arsenal). Two impacts 12 hours apart on July 19 created impact marks of similar size to that caused by fragment G, and impacts continued until July 22, when fragment W struck the planet.

== Observations and discoveries ==
=== Chemical studies ===
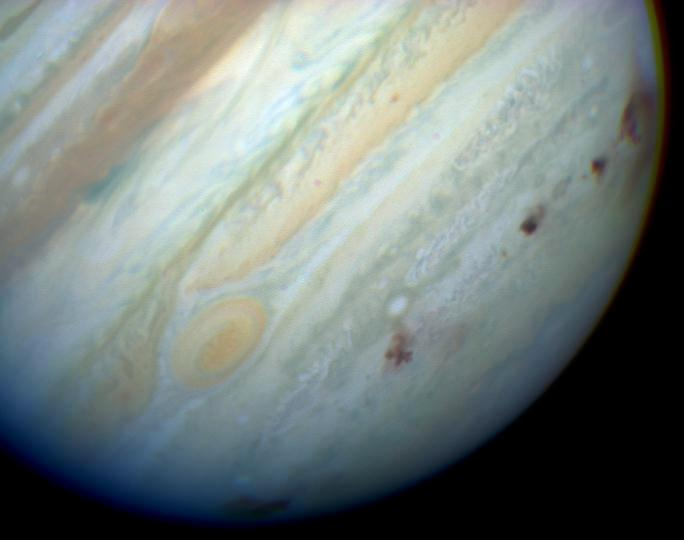
Brown spots mark impact sites on Jupiter's southern hemisphere.

Observers hoped that the impacts would give them a first glimpse of Jupiter beneath the cloud tops, as lower material was exposed by the comet fragments punching through the upper atmosphere. Spectroscopic studies revealed absorption lines in the Jovian spectrum due to diatomic sulfur (S_{2}) and carbon disulfide (CS_{2}), the first detection of either in Jupiter, and only the second detection of S_{2} in any astronomical object. Other molecules detected included ammonia (NH_{3}) and hydrogen sulfide (H_{2}S). The amount of sulfur implied by the quantities of these compounds was much greater than the amount that would be expected in a small cometary nucleus, showing that material from within Jupiter was being revealed. Oxygen-bearing molecules such as sulfur dioxide were not detected, to the surprise of astronomers.

As well as these molecules, emission from heavy atoms such as iron, magnesium and silicon were detected, with abundances consistent with what would be found in a cometary nucleus. Although a substantial amount of water was detected spectroscopically, it was not as much as predicted, meaning that either the water layer thought to exist below the clouds was thinner than predicted, or that the cometary fragments did not penetrate deeply enough.

=== Waves ===
As predicted, the collisions generated enormous waves that swept across Jupiter at speeds of 450 m/s (1,500 ft/s) and were observed for over two hours after the largest impacts. The waves were thought to be travelling within a stable layer acting as a waveguide, and some scientists thought the stable layer must lie within the hypothesised tropospheric water cloud. However, other evidence seemed to indicate that the cometary fragments had not reached the water layer, and the waves were instead propagating within the stratosphere.

=== Other observations ===
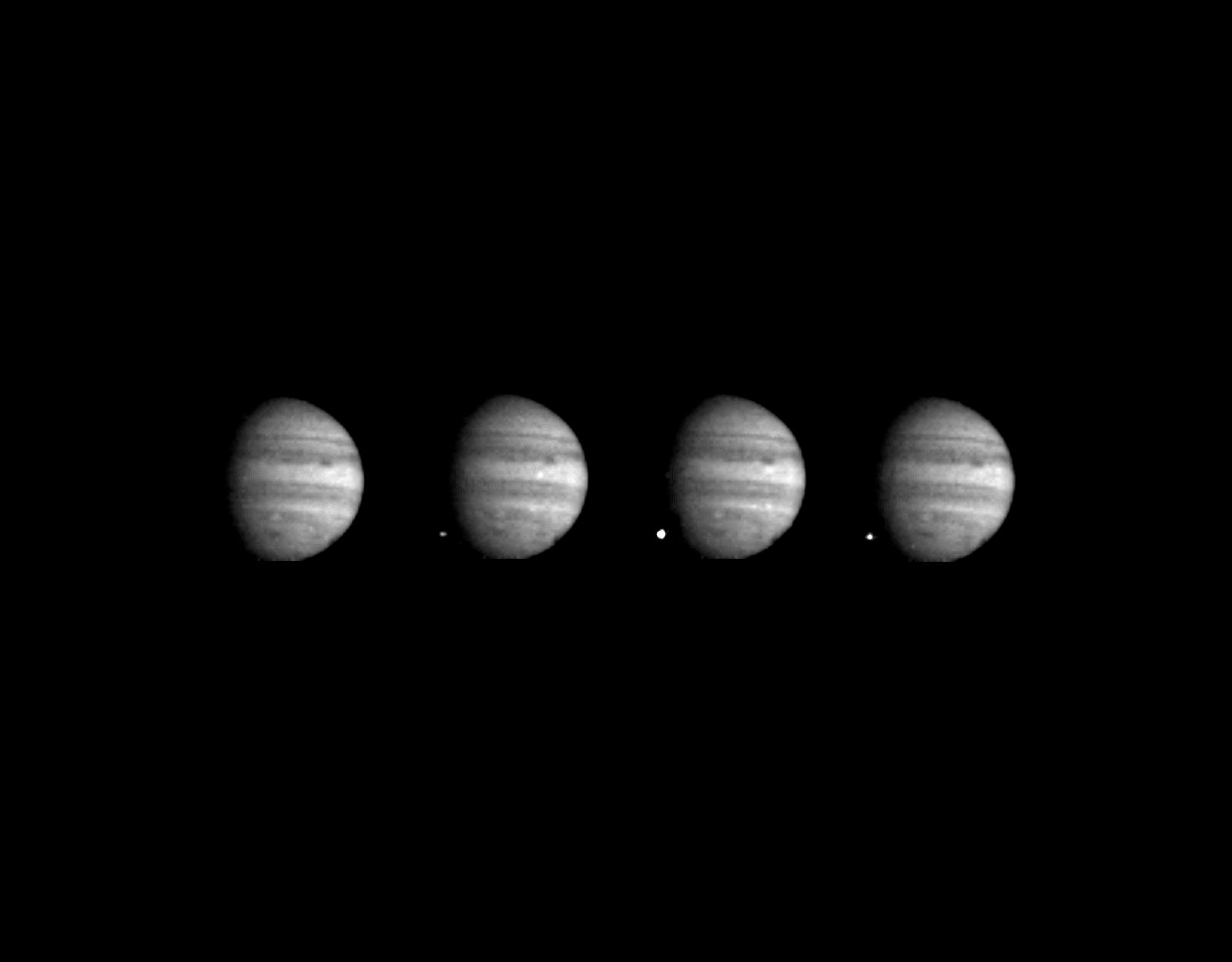
A sequence of Galileo images, taken several seconds apart, showing the appearance of the fireball of fragment W on the dark side of Jupiter

Radio observations revealed a sharp increase in continuum emission at a wavelength of 21 cm (8.3 in) after the largest impacts, which peaked at 120% of the normal emission from the planet. This was thought to be due to synchrotron radiation, caused by the injection of relativistic electrons—electrons with velocities near the speed of light—into the Jovian magnetosphere by the impacts.

About an hour after fragment K entered Jupiter, observers recorded auroral emission near the impact region, as well as at the antipode of the impact site with respect to Jupiter's strong magnetic field. The cause of these emissions was difficult to establish due to a lack of knowledge of Jupiter's internal magnetic field and of the geometry of the impact sites. One possible explanation was that upwardly accelerating shock waves from the impact accelerated charged particles enough to cause auroral emission, a phenomenon more typically associated with fast-moving solar wind particles striking a planetary atmosphere near a magnetic pole.

Some astronomers had suggested that the impacts might have a noticeable effect on the Io torus, a torus of high-energy particles connecting Jupiter with the highly volcanic moon Io. High resolution spectroscopic studies found that variations in the ion density, rotational velocity, and temperatures at the time of impact and afterwards were within the normal limits.

Voyager 2 failed to detect anything with calculations, showing that the fireballs were just below the craft's limit of detection; no abnormal levels of UV radiation or radio signals were registered after the blast. Ulysses also failed to detect any abnormal radio frequencies.

== Post-impact analysis ==
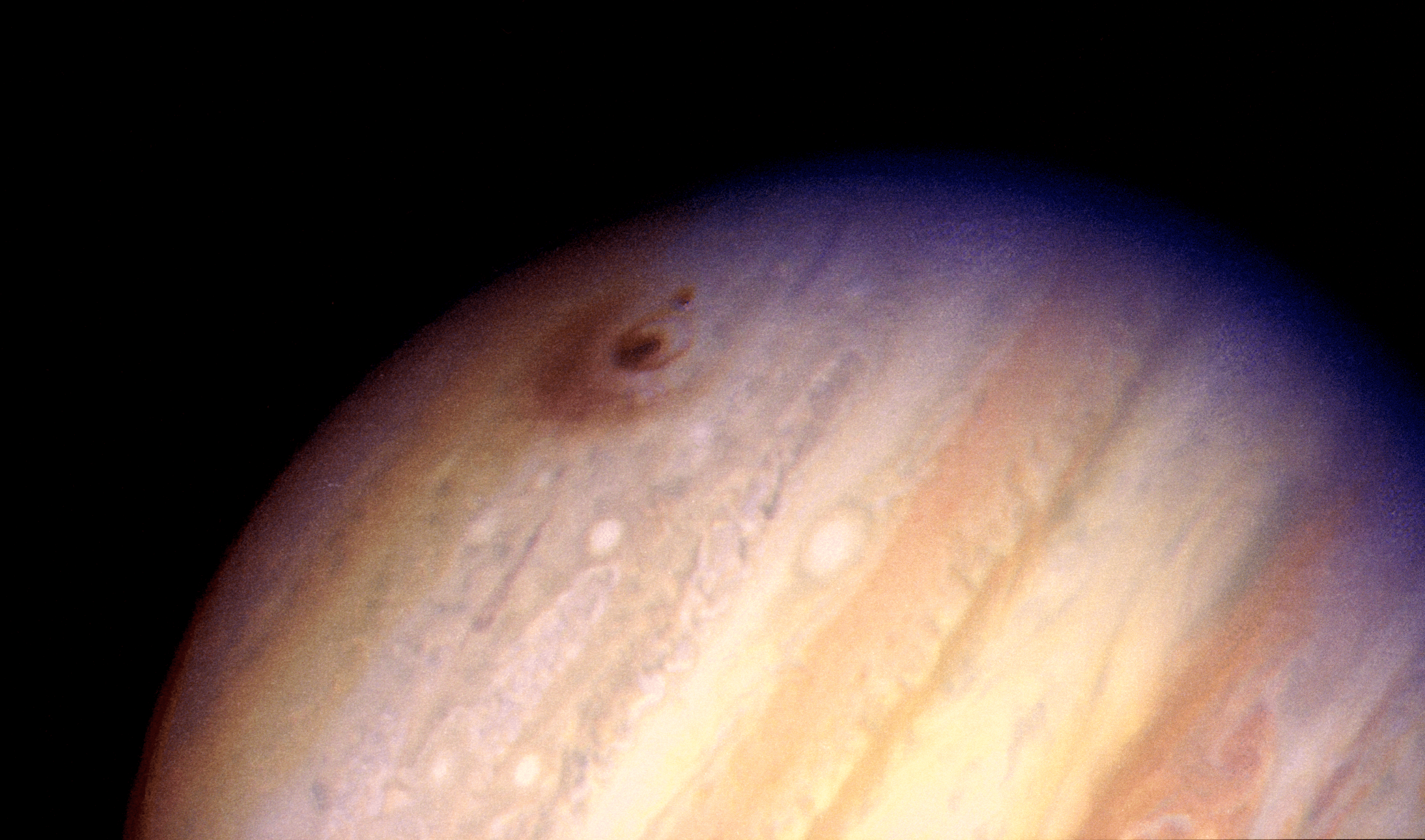
A reddish, asymmetric ejecta pattern

Several models were devised to compute the density and size of Shoemaker–Levy 9. Its average density was calculated to be about 0.5 g/cm^{3} (0.018 lb/cu in); the breakup of a much less dense comet would not have resembled the observed string of objects. The size of the parent comet was calculated to be about 1.8 km (1.1 mi) in diameter. These predictions were among the few that were actually confirmed by subsequent observation.

One of the surprises of the impacts was the small amount of water revealed compared to predictions. Before the impact, models of Jupiter's atmosphere had indicated that the break-up of the largest fragments would occur at atmospheric pressures of anywhere from 30 kilopascals to a few tens of megapascals (from 0.3 to a few hundred bar), with some predictions that the comet would penetrate a layer of water and create a bluish shroud over that region of Jupiter.

Astronomers did not observe large amounts of water following the collisions, and later impact studies found that fragmentation and destruction of the cometary fragments in a meteor air burst probably occurred at much higher altitudes than previously expected, with even the largest fragments being destroyed when the pressure reached 250 kPa (36 psi), well above the expected depth of the water layer. The smaller fragments were probably destroyed before they even reached the cloud layer.

== Longer-term effects ==
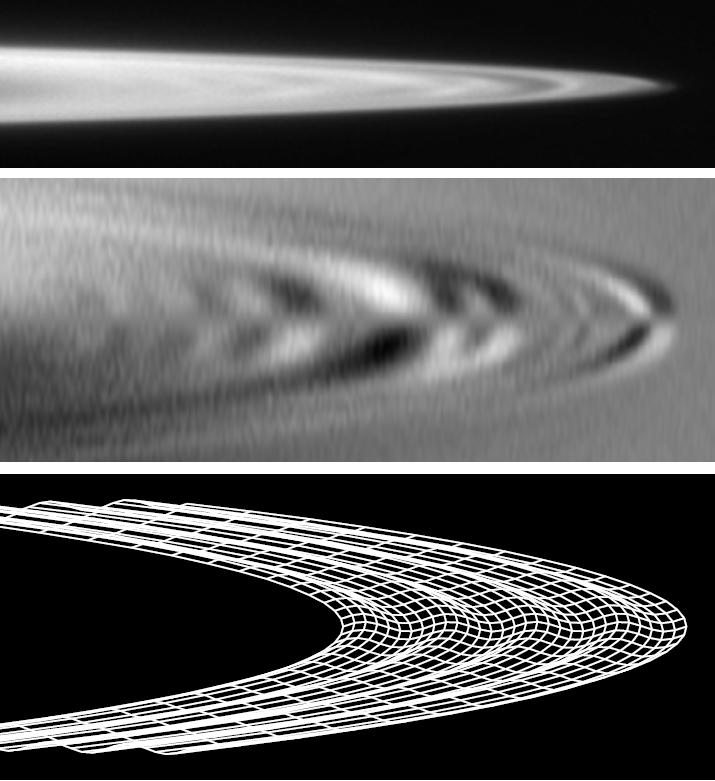
Ripples in the rings of Jupiter seen by Galileo spacecraft, caused by Shoemaker–Levy 9

The visible scars from the impacts could be seen on Jupiter for many months. They were extremely prominent, and observers described them as more easily visible than the Great Red Spot. A search of historical observations revealed that the spots were probably the most prominent transient features ever seen on the planet, and that although the Great Red Spot is notable for its striking color, no spots of the size and darkness of those caused by the SL9 impacts had ever been recorded before, or since.

The impact produced many new species in the stratosphere of Jupiter. Long-lasting species are H_{2}O, CO, CS and HCN. H_{2}O emission was monitored between 2002 and 2019 with the Odin Space Telescope and showed a linear decline. Spectroscopic observers found that ammonia and carbon disulfide (CS_{2}) persisted in the atmosphere for at least fourteen months after the collisions, with a considerable amount of ammonia being present in the stratosphere as opposed to its normal location in the troposphere. CS was detected 19 years after the impact with the Atacama Submillimeter Telescope Experiment in the atmosphere of Jupiter. The CS total mass showed a 90% decrease.

The new species can help to reveal the processes in Jupiter's aurora. ALMA detected CO and HCN. In and near the auroral region HCN was depleted. Chemical processes bonds HCN on large aurora-produced aerosols. James Webb Space Telescope observations from December 2022 detected an increase of H_{2}O in the south polar region, while CO_{2} is depleted. This is seen as an exchange of oxygen between the two molecules in the southern auroral region. HCN is also depleted towards the south polar region.

Atmospheric temperatures dropped to normal levels much more quickly at the larger impact sites than at the smaller sites: at the larger impact sites, temperatures were elevated over a region 15,000 to 20,000 km (9,300 to 12,400 mi) wide, but dropped back to normal levels within a week of the impact. At smaller sites, temperatures 10 K (10 °C; 18 °F) higher than the surroundings persisted for almost two weeks. Global stratospheric temperatures rose immediately after the impacts, then fell to below pre-impact temperatures two to three weeks afterwards, before rising slowly to normal temperatures.

Comet Shoemaker–Levy 9 also caused ripples in the faint ring system of Jupiter, which were first observed by Galileo. Thirteen years later, the New Horizons spacecraft en route to Pluto also observed ripples, suggesting that subsequent events may have also tilted the rings. Additionally it is predicted that the comet could have formed a new ring around Jupiter.

== Frequency of impacts ==
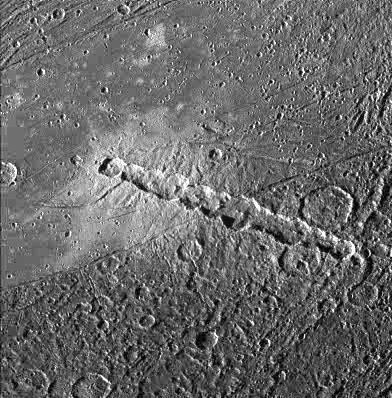
Enki Catena, a chain of craters on Ganymede, probably caused by a similar impact event. The picture covers an area approximately 190 km (120 mi) across

SL9 is not unique in having orbited Jupiter for a time; five comets, including 82P/Gehrels, 147P/Kushida–Muramatsu, and 111P/Helin–Roman–Crockett, are known to have been temporarily captured by the planet. Cometary orbits around Jupiter are unstable, as they will be highly elliptical and likely to be strongly perturbed by the Sun's gravity at apojove (the farthest point on the orbit from the planet).

By far the most massive planet in the Solar System, Jupiter can capture objects relatively frequently, but the size of SL9 makes it a rarity: one post-impact study estimated that comets 0.3 km (0.19 mi) in diameter impact the planet once in approximately 500 years and those 1.6 km (1 mi) in diameter do so just once in every 6,000 years.

There is very strong evidence that comets have previously been fragmented and collided with Jupiter and its satellites. During the Voyager missions to the planet, planetary scientists identified 13 crater chains on Callisto and three on Ganymede, the origin of which was initially a mystery. Crater chains seen on the Moon often radiate from large craters, and are thought to be caused by secondary impacts of the original ejecta, but the chains on the Jovian moons did not lead back to a larger crater. The impact of SL9 strongly implied that the chains were due to trains of disrupted cometary fragments crashing into the satellites.

=== Impact of July 19, 2009 ===
On July 19, 2009, exactly 15 years after the SL9 impacts, a new black spot about the size of the Pacific Ocean appeared in Jupiter's southern hemisphere. Thermal infrared measurements showed the impact site was warm and spectroscopic analysis detected the production of excess hot ammonia and silica-rich dust in the upper regions of Jupiter's atmosphere. Scientists have concluded that another impact event had occurred, but this time a more compact and stronger object, probably a small undiscovered asteroid, was the cause.

== Jupiter's role in the protection of the inner Solar System ==
The events of SL9's interaction with Jupiter greatly highlighted Jupiter's role in protecting the inner planets from both interstellar and in-system debris by acting as a "cosmic vacuum cleaner" for the Solar System (Jupiter barrier). The planet's strong gravitational influence attracts many small comets and asteroids and the rate of cometary impacts on Jupiter is thought to be between 2,000 and 8,000 times higher than the rate on Earth.

The extinction of the non-avian dinosaurs at the end of the Cretaceous period is generally thought to have been caused by the Cretaceous–Paleogene impact event, which created the Chicxulub crater, demonstrating that cometary impacts are indeed a serious threat to life on Earth. Astronomers have speculated that without Jupiter's immense gravity, extinction events might have been more frequent on Earth and complex life might not have been able to develop. This is part of the argument used in the Rare Earth hypothesis.

In 2009, it was shown that the presence of a smaller planet at Jupiter's position in the Solar System might increase the impact rate of comets on the Earth significantly. A planet of Jupiter's mass still seems to provide increased protection against asteroids, but the total effect on all orbital bodies within the Solar System is unclear. This and other recent models call into question the nature of Jupiter's influence on Earth impacts.

== See also ==
- List of Jupiter events
- Impact events on Jupiter
- Atmosphere of Jupiter
- 73P/Schwassmann–Wachmann, a near-Earth comet in the process of disintegrating
