= Jupiter barrier =

Outer planets shielding the inner planets

Jupiter Barrier or Jupiter Saturn Barrier is the name for an effect of the gas giants (in particular Jupiter), that reduces the likelihood for objects from the outer Solar System (in particular from the Oort cloud) to reach the inner Solar System.

Jupiter has been nicknamed the Solar System's "cosmic vacuum cleaner" by astronomers who speculate that its gravity reduces the amount of objects reaching the inner Solar System, protecting the smaller planets from impact events. Because such collisions can nearly, if not completely, destroy all life on a planet, the protection of the Jupiter barrier may have supported the evolution of biological complexity on Earth.

== See also ==
- Jupiter trojan
- Late Heavy Bombardment
