= Outline of Uranus =

Overview of and topical guide to Uranus

The following outline is provided as an overview of and topical guide to Uranus:

Uranus – seventh planet from the Sun. It has the third-largest planetary radius and fourth-largest planetary mass in the Solar System. Uranus is similar in composition to Neptune, and both have different bulk chemical composition from that of the larger gas giants Jupiter and Saturn. For this reason, scientists often classify Uranus and Neptune as "ice giants" to distinguish them from the gas giants. Uranus's atmosphere is similar to Jupiter's and Saturn's in its primary composition of hydrogen and helium, but it contains more "ices" such as water, ammonia, and methane, along with traces of other hydrocarbons. It has the coldest planetary atmosphere in the Solar System, with a minimum temperature of 49 K (−224.2 °C), and has a complex, layered cloud structure with water thought to make up the lowest clouds and methane the uppermost layer of clouds. The interior of Uranus is mainly composed of ice and rock.

== Classification of Uranus ==
- Astronomical object
  - Gravitationally rounded object
    - Planet
      - Giant planet
        - Ice giant
      - Planet of the Solar System
        - Outer planet
        - Superior planet

== Location of Uranus ==
- Milky Way Galaxy – barred spiral galaxy
  - Orion Arm – a spiral arm of the Milky Way
    - Solar System – the Sun and the objects that orbit it, including 8 planets, the seventh and second-furthest planet from the Sun being Uranus
      - Orbit of Uranus

== Movement of Uranus ==
- Orbit of Uranus
- Rotation of Uranus

== Features of Uranus ==
- Atmosphere of Uranus
- Climate of Uranus
- Rings of Uranus

== Natural satellites of Uranus ==
- Moons of Uranus

=== Inner moons of Uranus ===
- Cordelia
- Ophelia
- Uranus XXVIII
- Bianca
- Cressida
- Desdemona
- Juliet
- Portia
- Rosalind
- Cupid
- Belinda
- Perdita
- Puck
- Mab

=== Large moons of Uranus ===
- Miranda
- List of geological features on Miranda
- Ariel
- List of geological features on Ariel
- Umbriel
- Titania
- Oberon

=== Irregular moons of Uranus ===
- Francisco
- Caliban
- Stephano
- S/2023 U 1
- Trinculo
- Sycorax
- Margaret
- Prospero
- Setebos
- Ferdinand

== History of Uranus ==
History of Uranus

=== Exploration of Uranus ===
Exploration of Uranus

==== Flyby missions to explore Uranus ====
- Voyager 2

== Future of Uranus exploration ==
=== Proposed missions to explore Uranus ===
- Uranus orbiter and probe

== See also ==
- Outline of astronomy
  - Outline of the Solar System
- Outline of space exploration
