= Tidal acceleration =

Natural phenomenon due to which tidal locking occurs

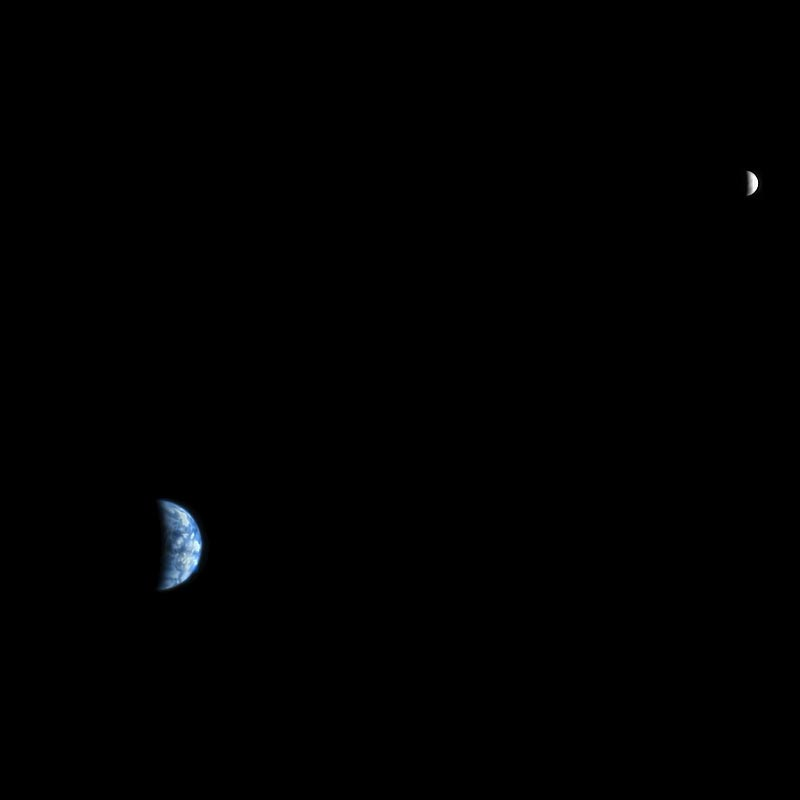
A picture of Earth and the Moon from Mars. The presence of the Moon (which has about 1/81 the mass of Earth), is slowing Earth's rotation and extending the day by a little under 2 milliseconds every 100 years.

Tidal acceleration is an effect of the tidal forces between an orbiting natural satellite (e.g. the Moon) and the primary planet that it orbits (e.g. Earth). The acceleration causes a gradual recession of a satellite in a prograde orbit (satellite moving to a higher orbit, away from the primary body, with a lower orbital speed and hence a longer orbital period), and a corresponding slowdown of the primary's rotation, known as tidal braking. The process eventually leads to tidal locking, usually of the smaller body first, and later the larger body (e.g. theoretically with Earth-Moon system in 50 billion years). The Earth–Moon system is the best-studied case.

The similar process of tidal deceleration occurs for satellites that have an orbital period that is shorter than the primary's rotational period, or that orbit in a retrograde direction. These satellites will have a higher and higher orbital velocity and a shorter and shorter orbital period, until a final collision with the primary.

The naming is somewhat confusing, because the average speed of the satellite relative to the body it orbits is decreased as a result of tidal acceleration, and increased as a result of tidal deceleration. This conundrum occurs because a positive acceleration at one instant causes the satellite to loop farther outward during the next half orbit, decreasing its average speed. A continuing positive acceleration causes the satellite to spiral outward with a decreasing speed and angular rate, resulting in a negative acceleration of angle. A continuing negative acceleration has the opposite effect.

== Earth–Moon system ==
=== Discovery history of the secular acceleration ===
Edmond Halley was the first to suggest, in 1695, that the mean motion of the Moon was apparently getting faster, by comparison with ancient eclipse observations, but he gave no data. (It was not yet known in Halley's time that what is actually occurring includes a slowing-down of Earth's rate of rotation: see also Ephemeris time – History. When measured as a function of mean solar time rather than uniform time, the effect appears as a positive acceleration.) In 1749 Richard Dunthorne confirmed Halley's suspicion after re-examining ancient records, and produced the first quantitative estimate for the size of this apparent effect: a centurial rate of +10″ (arcseconds) in lunar longitude, which is a surprisingly accurate result for its time, not differing greatly from values assessed later, e.g. in 1786 by de Lalande, and to compare with values from about 10″ to nearly 13″ being derived about a century later.

Pierre-Simon Laplace produced in 1786 a theoretical analysis giving a basis on which the Moon's mean motion should accelerate in response to perturbational changes in the eccentricity of the orbit of Earth around the Sun. Laplace's initial computation accounted for the whole effect, thus seeming to tie up the theory neatly with both modern and ancient observations.

However, in 1854, John Couch Adams caused the question to be re-opened by finding an error in Laplace's computations: it turned out that only about half of the Moon's apparent acceleration could be accounted for on Laplace's basis by the change in Earth's orbital eccentricity. Adams' finding provoked a sharp astronomical controversy that lasted some years, but the correctness of his result, agreed upon by other mathematical astronomers including C. E. Delaunay, was eventually accepted. The question depended on correct analysis of the lunar motions, and received a further complication with another discovery, around the same time, that another significant long-term perturbation that had been calculated for the Moon (supposedly due to the action of Venus) was also in error, was found on re-examination to be almost negligible, and practically had to disappear from the theory. A part of the answer was suggested independently in the 1860s by Delaunay and by William Ferrel: tidal retardation of Earth's rotation rate was lengthening the unit of time and causing a lunar acceleration that was only apparent.

It took some time for the astronomical community to accept the reality and the scale of tidal effects. But eventually it became clear that three effects are involved, when measured in terms of mean solar time. Beside the effects of perturbational changes in Earth's orbital eccentricity, as found by Laplace and corrected by Adams, there are two tidal effects (a combination first suggested by Emmanuel Liais). First there is a real retardation of the Moon's angular rate of orbital motion, due to tidal exchange of angular momentum between Earth and Moon. This increases the Moon's angular momentum around Earth (and moves the Moon to a higher orbit with a lower orbital speed). Secondly, there is an apparent increase in the Moon's angular rate of orbital motion (when measured in terms of mean solar time). This arises from Earth's loss of angular momentum and the consequent increase in length of day.

=== Effects of Moon's gravity ===
A diagram of the Earth–Moon system showing how the tidal bulge is pushed ahead by Earth's rotation. This offset bulge exerts a net torque on the Moon, boosting it while slowing Earth's rotation.

The plane of the Moon's orbit around Earth lies close to the plane of Earth's orbit around the Sun (the ecliptic), rather than in the plane of the Earth's rotation (the equator) as is usually the case with planetary satellites. The mass of the Moon is sufficiently large, and it is sufficiently close, to raise tides in the matter of Earth. Foremost among such matter, the water of the oceans bulges out both towards and away from the Moon. If the material of the Earth responded immediately, there would be a bulge directly toward and away from the Moon. In the solid Earth tides, there is a delayed response due to the dissipation of tidal energy. The case for the oceans is more complicated, but there is also a delay associated with the dissipation of energy since the Earth rotates at a faster rate than the Moon's orbital angular velocity. This lunitidal interval in the responses causes the tidal bulge to be carried forward. Consequently, the line through the two bulges is tilted with respect to the Earth-Moon direction exerting torque between the Earth and the Moon. This torque boosts the Moon in its orbit and slows the rotation of Earth.

As a result of this process, the mean solar day, which has to be 86,400 equal seconds, is actually getting longer when measured in SI seconds with stable atomic clocks. (The SI second, when adopted, was already a little shorter than the current value of the second of mean solar time.) The small difference accumulates over time, which leads to an increasing difference between our clock time (Universal Time) on the one hand, and International Atomic Time and ephemeris time on the other hand: see ΔT. This led to the introduction of the leap second in 1972 to compensate for differences in the bases for time standardization.

In addition to the effect of the ocean tides, there is also a tidal acceleration due to flexing of Earth's crust, but this accounts for only about 4% of the total effect when expressed in terms of heat dissipation.

If other effects were ignored, tidal acceleration would continue until the rotational period of Earth matched the orbital period of the Moon. At that time, the Moon would always be overhead of a single fixed place on Earth. Such a situation already exists in the Pluto–Charon system. However, the slowdown of Earth's rotation is not occurring fast enough for the rotation to lengthen to a month before other effects make this irrelevant: about 1 to 1.5 billion years from now, the continual increase of the Sun's radiation will likely cause Earth's oceans to vaporize, removing the bulk of the tidal friction and acceleration. Even without this, the slowdown to a month-long day would still not have been completed by 4.5 billion years from now when the Sun will probably evolve into a red giant and likely destroy both Earth and the Moon.

Tidal acceleration is one of the few examples in the dynamics of the Solar System of a so-called secular perturbation of an orbit, i.e. a perturbation that continuously increases with time and is not periodic. Up to a high order of approximation, mutual gravitational perturbations between major or minor planets only cause periodic variations in their orbits, that is, parameters oscillate between maximum and minimum values. The tidal effect gives rise to a quadratic term in the equations, which leads to unbounded growth. In the mathematical theories of the planetary orbits that form the basis of ephemerides, quadratic and higher order secular terms do occur, but these are mostly Taylor expansions of very long time periodic terms. The reason that tidal effects are different is that unlike distant gravitational perturbations, friction is an essential part of tidal acceleration, and leads to permanent loss of energy from the dynamic system in the form of heat. In other words, we do not have a Hamiltonian system here.

=== Angular momentum and energy ===
The gravitational torque between the Moon and the tidal bulge of Earth causes the Moon to be constantly promoted to a slightly higher orbit and Earth to be decelerated in its rotation. As in any physical process within an isolated system, total energy and angular momentum are conserved. Effectively, energy and angular momentum are transferred from the rotation of Earth to the orbital motion of the Moon (however, most of the energy lost by Earth (−3.78 TW) is converted to heat by frictional losses in the oceans and their interaction with the solid Earth, and only about 1/30th (+0.121 TW) is transferred to the Moon). The Moon moves farther away from Earth (+38.30±0.08 mm/yr), so its potential energy, which is still negative (in Earth's gravity well), increases, i. e. becomes less negative. It stays in orbit, and from Kepler's 3rd law it follows that its average angular velocity actually decreases, so the tidal action on the Moon actually causes an angular deceleration, i.e. a negative acceleration (−25.97±0.05"/century^{2}) of its rotation around Earth. The actual speed of the Moon also decreases. Although its kinetic energy decreases, its potential energy increases by a larger amount, i. e. E_{p} = -2E_{c} (Virial Theorem).

The rotational angular momentum of Earth decreases and consequently the length of the day increases. The net tide raised on Earth by the Moon is dragged ahead of the Moon by Earth's much faster rotation. Tidal friction is required to drag and maintain the bulge ahead of the Moon, and it dissipates the excess energy of the exchange of rotational and orbital energy between Earth and the Moon as heat. If the friction and heat dissipation were not present, the Moon's gravitational force on the tidal bulge would rapidly (within two days) bring the tide back into synchronization with the Moon, and the Moon would no longer recede. Most of the dissipation occurs in a turbulent bottom boundary layer in shallow seas such as the European Shelf around the British Isles, the Patagonian Shelf off Argentina, and the Bering Sea.

The dissipation of energy by tidal friction averages about 3.64 terawatts of the 3.78 terawatts extracted, of which 2.5 terawatts are from the principal M_{2} lunar component and the remainder from other components, both lunar and solar.

An equilibrium tidal bulge does not really exist on Earth because the continents do not allow this mathematical solution to take place. Oceanic tides actually rotate around the ocean basins as vast gyres around several amphidromic points where no tide exists. The Moon pulls on each individual undulation as Earth rotates—some undulations are ahead of the Moon, others are behind it, whereas still others are on either side. The "bulges" that actually do exist for the Moon to pull on (and which pull on the Moon) are the net result of integrating the actual undulations over all the world's oceans.

=== Historical evidence ===
This mechanism has been working for 4.5 billion years, since oceans first formed on Earth, but less so at times when much or most of the water was ice. There is geological and paleontological evidence that Earth rotated faster and that the Moon was closer to Earth in the remote past. Tidal rhythmites are alternating layers of sand and silt laid down offshore from estuaries having great tidal flows. Daily, monthly and seasonal cycles can be found in the deposits. This geological record is consistent with these conditions 620 million years ago: the day was 21.9±0.4 hours, and there were 13.1±0.1 synodic months/year and 400±7 solar days/year. The average recession rate of the Moon between then and now has been 2.17±0.31 cm/year, which is about half the present rate. The present high rate may be due to near resonance between natural ocean frequencies and tidal frequencies.

Analysis of layering in fossil mollusc shells from 70 million years ago, in the Late Cretaceous period, shows that there were 372 days a year, and thus that the day was about 23.5 hours long then.

=== Quantitative description of the Earth–Moon case ===
The motion of the Moon can be followed with an accuracy of a few centimeters by lunar laser ranging (LLR). Laser pulses are bounced off corner-cube prism retroreflectors on the surface of the Moon, emplaced during the Apollo missions of 1969 to 1972 and by Lunokhod 1 in 1970 and Lunokhod 2 in 1973. Measuring the return time of the pulse yields a very accurate measure of the distance. These measurements are fitted to the equations of motion. This yields numerical values for the Moon's secular deceleration, i.e. negative acceleration, in longitude and the rate of change of the semimajor axis of the Earth–Moon ellipse. From the period 1970–2015, the results are:

−25.97 ± 0.05 arcsecond/century^{2} in ecliptic longitude
+38.30 ± 0.08 mm/yr in the mean Earth–Moon distance

This is consistent with results from satellite laser ranging (SLR), a similar technique applied to artificial satellites orbiting Earth, which yields a model for the gravitational field of Earth, including that of the tides. The model accurately predicts the changes in the motion of the Moon.

Finally, ancient observations of solar eclipses give fairly accurate positions for the Moon at those moments. Studies of these observations give results consistent with the value quoted above.

The other consequence of tidal acceleration is the deceleration of the rotation of Earth. The rotation of Earth is somewhat erratic on all time scales (from hours to centuries) due to various causes. The small tidal effect cannot be observed in a short period, but the cumulative effect on Earth's rotation as measured with a stable clock (ephemeris time, International Atomic Time) of a shortfall of even a few milliseconds every day becomes readily noticeable in a few centuries. Since some event in the remote past, more days and hours have passed (as measured in full rotations of Earth) (Universal Time) than would be measured by stable clocks calibrated to the present, longer length of the day (ephemeris time). This is known as ΔT. Recent values can be obtained from the International Earth Rotation and Reference Systems Service (IERS). A table of the actual length of the day in the past few centuries is also available.

From the observed change in the Moon's orbit, the corresponding change in the length of the day can be computed (where "cy" means "century", d day, s second, ms millisecond, 10^{−3} s, and ns nanosecond, 10^{−9} s):

+2.4 ms/d/century or +88 s/cy^{2} or +66 ns/d^{2}.

However, from historical records over the past 2700 years the following average value is found:

+1.72 ± 0.03 ms/d/century or +63 s/cy^{2} or +47 ns/d^{2}. (i.e. an accelerating cause is responsible for -0.7 ms/d/cy)

By twice integrating over the time, the corresponding cumulative value is a parabola having a coefficient of T^{2} (time in centuries squared) of (^{1}/_{2}) 63 s/cy^{2} :

ΔT = (^{1}/_{2}) 63 s/cy^{2} T^{2} = +31 s/cy^{2} T^{2}.

Opposing the tidal deceleration of Earth is a mechanism that is in fact accelerating the rotation. Earth is not a sphere, but rather an ellipsoid that is flattened at the poles. SLR has shown that this flattening is decreasing. The explanation is that during the ice age large masses of ice collected at the poles, and depressed the underlying rocks. The ice mass started disappearing over 10000 years ago, but Earth's crust is still not in hydrostatic equilibrium and is still rebounding (the relaxation time is estimated to be about 4000 years). As a consequence, the polar diameter of Earth increases, and the equatorial diameter decreases (Earth's volume must remain the same). This means that mass moves closer to the rotation axis of Earth, and that Earth's moment of inertia decreases. This process alone leads to an increase of the rotation rate (phenomenon of a spinning figure skater who spins ever faster as they retract their arms). From the observed change in the moment of inertia the acceleration of rotation can be computed: the average value over the historical period must have been about −0.6 ms/d/century. This largely explains the historical observations.

== Other cases of tidal acceleration ==
Most natural satellites of the planets undergo tidal acceleration to some degree (usually small), except for the two classes of tidally decelerated bodies. In most cases, however, the effect is small enough that even after billions of years most satellites will not actually be lost. The effect is probably most pronounced for Mars's second moon Deimos, which may become an Earth-crossing asteroid after it leaks out of Mars's grip.

Moreover, this tidal effect isn't solely limited to planetary satellites; it also manifests between different components within a binary star system. The gravitational interactions within such systems can induce tidal forces, leading to fascinating dynamics between the stars or their orbiting bodies, influencing their evolution and behavior over cosmic timescales.

== Tidal deceleration ==
In tidal acceleration (1), a satellite orbits in the same direction as (but slower than) its parent body's rotation. The nearer tidal bulge (red) attracts the satellite more than the farther bulge (blue), imparting a net positive force (dotted arrows showing forces resolved into their components) in the direction of orbit, lifting it into a higher orbit. In tidal deceleration (2) with the rotation reversed, the net force opposes the direction of orbit, lowering it.

This comes in two varieties:

1. Fast satellites: Some inner moons of the giant planets and Phobos orbit within the synchronous orbit radius so that their orbital period is shorter than their planet's rotation. In other words, they orbit their planet faster than the planet rotates. In this case the tidal bulges raised by the moon on their planet lag behind the moon, and act to decelerate it in its orbit. The net effect is a decay of that moon's orbit as it gradually spirals towards the planet. The planet's rotation also speeds up slightly in the process. In the distant future these moons will strike the planet or cross within their Roche limit and be tidally disrupted into fragments. However, all such moons in the Solar System are very small bodies and the tidal bulges raised by them on the planet are also small, so the effect is usually weak and the orbit decays slowly. The moons affected are:
  - Around Mars: Phobos
  - Around Jupiter: Metis and Adrastea
  - Around Saturn: none, except for the ring particles (like Jupiter, Saturn is a very rapid rotator but has no satellites close enough)
  - Around Uranus: Cordelia, Ophelia, Uranus XXVIII, Bianca, Cressida, Desdemona, Juliet, Portia, Rosalind, Cupid, Belinda, and Perdita
  - Around Neptune: Naiad, Thalassa, Despina, Galatea and Larissa
  Some hypothesize that after the Sun becomes a red giant, its surface rotation will be much slower and it will cause tidal deceleration of any remaining planets.
2. Retrograde satellites: All retrograde satellites experience tidal deceleration to some degree because their orbital motion and their planet's rotation are in opposite directions, causing restoring forces from their tidal bulges. A difference to the previous "fast satellite" case here is that the planet's rotation is also slowed down rather than sped up (angular momentum is still conserved because in such a case the values for the planet's rotation and the moon's revolution have opposite signs). The only satellite in the Solar System for which this effect is non-negligible is Neptune's moon Triton. All the other retrograde satellites are on distant orbits and tidal forces between them and the planet are negligible.

Mercury and Venus are believed to have no satellites chiefly because any hypothetical satellite would have suffered deceleration long ago and crashed into the planets due to the very slow rotation speeds of both planets; in addition, Venus also has retrograde rotation.

== See also ==
- Tidal locking
- Tidal force
- Tides
- Tidal heating
