= Tidal locking =

Situation in which an astronomical object's orbital period matches its rotational period

At left, tidally locked, the Moon rotates at the same rate it orbits the Earth, keeping the same face toward the planet. At right, not tidally locked, if the Moon did not rotate then the face would change over the course of an orbit. Viewed from north; not to scale.

A side view of the Pluto–Charon system. Pluto and Charon are tidally locked to each other.

Tidal locking between a pair of co-orbiting astronomical bodies occurs when one of the bodies reaches a state where there is no longer any net change in its rotation rate over the course of a complete orbit. In the case where a tidally locked object possesses synchronous rotation, the object takes just as long to rotate around its own axis as it does to revolve around its partner. For example, the same side of the Moon always faces Earth, although there is some variability because the Moon's orbit is not perfectly circular. Usually, only the satellite is tidally locked to the larger body. However, if both the difference in mass between the two bodies and the distance between them are relatively small, each may be tidally locked to the other; this is the case for Pluto and Charon, and for Eris and Dysnomia. Alternative names for tidal locking are gravitational locking, captured rotation, and spin–orbit locking. The process that ends in tidal locking is called tidal despinning, which ends in a tidally despun (or just despun) body.

The effect arises between two bodies when their gravitational interaction slows a body's rotation until it becomes tidally locked. Over many millions of years, the interaction forces changes to their orbits and rotation rates, as a result of energy exchange and heat dissipation. When one of the bodies reaches a state where there is no longer any net change in its rotation rate over the course of a complete orbit, it is said to be tidally locked. The object tends to stay in this state because leaving it would require adding energy back into the system. The object's orbit may migrate over time so as to undo the tidal lock, for example, if a giant planet perturbs the object.

There is ambiguity in the use of the terms 'tidally locked' and 'tidal locking', in that some scientific sources use it to refer exclusively to 1:1 synchronous rotation (e.g. the Moon), while others include non-synchronous orbital resonances in which there is no further transfer of angular momentum over the course of one orbit. In Mercury's case, the planet completes three rotations for every two revolutions around the Sun, a 3:2 spin–orbit resonance. In the special case where an orbit is nearly circular and the body's rotation axis is not significantly tilted, such as the Moon, tidal locking results in the same hemisphere of the revolving object constantly facing its partner. Regardless of which definition of tidal locking is used, the hemisphere that is visible changes slightly due to variations in the locked body's orbital velocity and the inclination of its rotation axis over time.

== Mechanism ==
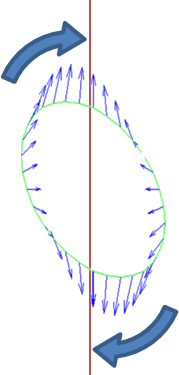
Here, the body's tidal bulges (green) are misaligned with the direction of the attracting force (red). The local tidal forces (blue) exert a net torque that twists the body back toward realignment.

Consider a pair of co-orbiting objects, A and B. The change in rotation rate necessary to tidally lock body B to the larger body A is caused by the torque applied by A's gravity on bulges it has induced on B by tidal forces.

The gravitational force from object A upon B will vary with distance, being greatest at the nearest surface to A and least at the most distant. This creates a gravitational gradient across object B that will distort its equilibrium shape slightly. The body of object B will become elongated along the axis oriented toward A, and conversely, slightly reduced in dimension in directions orthogonal to this axis. The elongated distortions are known as tidal bulges. (For the solid Earth, these bulges can reach displacements of up to around 0.4 m or 1 ft 4 in.) When B is not yet tidally locked, the bulges travel over its surface due to orbital motions, with one of the two "high" tidal bulges traveling close to the point where body A is overhead. For large astronomical bodies that are nearly spherical due to self-gravitation, the tidal distortion produces a slightly prolate spheroid, i.e. an axially symmetric ellipsoid that is elongated along its major axis. Smaller bodies also experience distortion, but this distortion is less regular.

The material of B exerts resistance to this periodic reshaping caused by the tidal force. In effect, some time is required to reshape B to the gravitational equilibrium shape, by which time the forming bulges have already been carried some distance away from the A–B axis by B's rotation. Seen from a vantage point in space, the points of maximum bulge extension are displaced from the axis oriented toward A. If B's rotation period is shorter than its orbital period, the bulges are carried forward of the axis oriented toward A in the direction of rotation, whereas if B's rotation period is longer, the bulges instead lag behind.

Because the bulges are now displaced from the A–B axis, A's gravitational pull on the mass in them exerts a torque on B. The torque on the A-facing bulge acts to bring B's rotation in line with its orbital period, whereas the "back" bulge, which faces away from A, acts in the opposite sense. However, the bulge on the A-facing side is closer to A than the back bulge by a distance of approximately B's diameter, and so experiences a slightly stronger gravitational force and torque. The net resulting torque from both bulges, then, is always in the direction that acts to synchronize B's rotation with its orbital period, leading eventually to tidal locking.

=== Orbital changes ===
In (1), a satellite orbits in the same direction as (but slower than) its parent body's rotation. The nearer tidal bulge (red) attracts the satellite more than the farther bulge (blue), slowing the parent's rotation while imparting a net positive force (dotted arrows showing forces resolved into their components) in the direction of orbit, lifting it into a higher orbit (tidal acceleration). In (2) with the rotation reversed, the net force opposes the satellite's direction of orbit, lowering it (tidal deceleration).

If rotational frequency is larger than orbital frequency, a small torque counteracting the rotation arises, eventually locking the frequencies (situation depicted in green)

The angular momentum of the whole A–B system is conserved in this process, so that when B slows down and loses rotational angular momentum, its orbital angular momentum is boosted by a similar amount (there are also some smaller effects on A's rotation). This results in a raising of B's orbit about A in tandem with its rotational slowdown. For the other case where B starts off rotating too slowly, tidal locking both speeds up its rotation, and lowers its orbit.

=== Locking of the larger body ===
The tidal locking effect is also experienced by the larger body A, but at a slower rate because B's gravitational effect is weaker due to B's smaller mass. For example, Earth's rotation is gradually being slowed by the Moon, by an amount that becomes noticeable over geological time as revealed in the fossil record. Current estimations are that this (together with the tidal influence of the Sun) has helped lengthen the Earth day from about 6 hours to the current 24 hours (over about 4.5 billion years). Currently, atomic clocks show that Earth's day lengthens, on average, by about 2.3 milliseconds per century. Given enough time, this would create a mutual tidal locking between Earth and the Moon. The length of Earth's day would increase and the length of a lunar month would also increase. Earth's sidereal day would eventually have the same length as the Moon's sidereal orbital period, by then much longer than the present 27.3 Earth days, about 47 times the length of the Earth day at present. However, Earth is not expected to become tidally locked to the Moon before the Sun becomes a red giant and engulfs both.

For bodies of similar size the effect may be of comparable size for both, and both may become tidally locked to each other on a much shorter timescale. An example is the dwarf planet Pluto and its satellite Charon. They have already reached a state where Charon is visible from only one hemisphere of Pluto and vice versa.

=== Eccentric orbits ===
A widely spread misapprehension is that a tidally locked body permanently turns one side to its host.

— Heller et al. (2011)

For orbits that do not have an eccentricity close to zero, the rotation rate tends to become locked with the orbital speed when the body is at periapsis, which is the point of strongest tidal interaction between the two objects. If the orbiting object has a companion, this third body can cause the rotation rate of the parent object to vary in an oscillatory manner. This interaction can also drive an increase in orbital eccentricity of the orbiting object around the primary – an effect known as eccentricity pumping.

In some cases where the orbit is eccentric and the tidal effect is relatively weak, the smaller body may end up in a so-called spin–orbit resonance, rather than being tidally locked. Here, the ratio of the rotation period of a body to its own orbital period is some simple fraction different from 1:1. A well known case is the rotation of Mercury, which is locked to its own orbit around the Sun in a 3:2 resonance. This results in the rotation speed roughly matching the orbital speed around perihelion.

Many exoplanets (especially the close-in ones) are expected to be in spin–orbit resonances higher than 1:1. A Mercury-like terrestrial planet can, for example, become captured in a 3:2, 2:1, or 5:2 spin–orbit resonance, with the probability of each being dependent on the orbital eccentricity.

== Occurrence ==
=== Moons ===
Due to tidal locking, the inhabitants of the central body will never be able to see the satellite's green area.

All nineteen known moons in the Solar System that are large enough to be round are tidally locked with their primaries, because they orbit very closely and tidal force increases rapidly (as a cubic function) with decreasing distance. On the other hand, most of the irregular outer satellites of the giant planets (e.g. Phoebe), which orbit much farther away than the large well-known moons, are not tidally locked.

Pluto and Charon are an extreme example of a tidal lock. Charon is a relatively large moon in comparison to its primary and also has a very close orbit. This results in Pluto and Charon being mutually tidally locked. Pluto's other moons are not tidally locked; Styx, Nix, Kerberos, and Hydra all rotate chaotically due to the influence of Charon. Similarly, Eris and Dysnomia are mutually tidally locked, as are Salacia and Actaea. Orcus and Vanth might also be mutually tidally locked, but the data is not conclusive.

The tidal locking situation for asteroid moons is largely unknown, but closely orbiting binaries are expected to be tidally locked, as well as contact binaries.

==== Earth's Moon ====
This simulation shows the variability in the portion of the Moon visible from Earth due to libration over the course of an orbit. Lighting phases from the Sun are not included.

Earth's Moon's rotation and orbital periods are tidally locked with each other, so no matter when the Moon is observed from Earth, the same hemisphere of the Moon is always seen. Most of the far side of the Moon was not seen until 1959, when photographs of most of the far side were transmitted from the Soviet spacecraft Luna 3.

When Earth is observed from the Moon, Earth does not appear to move across the sky. It remains in nearly the same place while showing nearly all its surface as it rotates on its axis.

Despite the Moon's rotational and orbital periods being exactly locked, about 59 percent of the Moon's total surface may be seen with repeated observations from Earth, due to the phenomena of libration and parallax. Librations are primarily caused by the Moon's varying orbital speed due to the eccentricity of its orbit: this allows up to about 6° more along its perimeter to be seen from Earth. Parallax is a geometric effect: at the surface of Earth observers are offset from the line through the centers of Earth and Moon; this accounts for about a 1° difference in the Moon's surface which can be seen around the sides of the Moon when comparing observations made during moonrise and moonset.

=== Planets ===
It was thought for some time that Mercury was in synchronous rotation with the Sun. This was because whenever Mercury was best placed for observation, the same side faced inward. Radar observations in 1965 demonstrated instead that Mercury has a 3:2 spin–orbit resonance, rotating three times for every two revolutions around the Sun, which results in the same positioning at those observation points. Modeling has demonstrated that Mercury was captured into the 3:2 spin–orbit state very early in its history, probably within 10–20 million years after its formation.

The 583.92-day interval between successive close approaches of Venus to Earth is equal to 5.001444 Venusian solar days, making approximately the same face visible from Earth at each close approach. Whether this relationship arose by chance or is the result of some kind of tidal locking with Earth is unknown.

The exoplanet Proxima Centauri b discovered in 2016 which orbits around Proxima Centauri, is almost certainly tidally locked, expressing either synchronized rotation or a 3:2 spin–orbit resonance like that of Mercury.

One form of hypothetical tidally locked exoplanets are eyeball planets, which in turn are divided into "hot" and "cold" eyeball planets.

=== Stars ===
Close binary stars throughout the universe are expected to be tidally locked with each other, and extrasolar planets that have been found to orbit their primaries extremely closely are also thought to be tidally locked to them. An unusual example, confirmed by MOST, may be Tau Boötis, a star that is probably tidally locked by its planet Tau Boötis b. If so, the tidal locking is almost certainly mutual.

== Timescale ==
An estimate of the time for a body to become tidally locked can be obtained using the following formula:

$$t_{\text{lock}} \approx \frac{\omega a^6 I Q}{3 G m_p^2 k_2 R^5}$$

where

- $\omega\,$ is the initial spin rate expressed in radians per unit time,
- $a\,$ is the semi-major axis of the motion of the satellite around the planet (given by the average of the periapsis and apoapsis distances),
- $I\,$ $\approx 0.4\; m_s R^2$ is the moment of inertia of the satellite, where
- $m_s$ is the mass of the satellite and
- $R$ is the mean radius of the satellite,
- $Q\,$ is the dissipation function of the satellite,
- $G\,$ is the gravitational constant,
- $m_p\,$ is the mass of the planet (i.e., the object being orbited), and
- $k_2\,$ is the tidal Love number of the satellite.

$Q$ and $k_2$ are generally very poorly known except for the Moon, which has $k_2/Q=0.0011$. For a really rough estimate it is common to take $Q \approx 100$ (perhaps conservatively, giving overestimated locking times), and

$$k_2 \approx \frac{1.5}{1+\frac{19\mu}{2\rho g R}},$$

where

- $\rho\,$ is the density of the satellite
- $g\approx Gm_s/R^2$ is the surface gravity of the satellite
- $\mu\,$ is the rigidity of the satellite. This can be roughly taken as 3×10^{10} N/m^{2} for rocky objects and 4×10^{9} N/m^{2} for icy ones.

Even knowing the size and density of the satellite leaves many parameters that must be estimated (especially ω, Q, and μ), so that any calculated locking times obtained are expected to be inaccurate, even to factors of ten. Further, during the tidal locking phase the semi-major axis $a$ may have been significantly different from that observed nowadays due to subsequent tidal acceleration, and the locking time is extremely sensitive to this value.

Because the uncertainty is so high, the above formulas can be simplified to give a somewhat less cumbersome one. By assuming that the satellite is spherical, $k_2\ll1\, , Q = 100$, and it is sensible to guess one revolution every 12 hours in the initial non-locked state (most asteroids have rotational periods between about 2 hours and about 2 days)

$t_{\text{lock}} \approx 6\ \frac{a^6R\mu}{m_sm_p^2} \times 10^{10}\ \text{years},$

with masses in kilograms, distances in meters, and $\mu$ in newtons per meter squared; $\mu$ can be roughly taken as 3×10^{10} N/m^{2} for rocky objects and 4×10^{9} N/m^{2} for icy ones.

There is an extremely strong dependence on semi-major axis $a$.

For the locking of a primary body to its satellite as in the case of Pluto, the satellite and primary body parameters can be swapped.

One conclusion is that, other things being equal (such as $Q$ and $\mu$), a large moon will lock faster than a smaller moon at the same orbital distance from the planet because $m_s\,$ grows as the cube of the satellite radius $R$. A possible example of this is in the Saturn system, where Hyperion is not tidally locked, whereas the larger Iapetus, which orbits at a greater distance, is. However, this is not clear cut because Hyperion also experiences strong driving from the nearby Titan, which forces its rotation to be chaotic.

The above formulae for the timescale of locking may be off by orders of magnitude, because they ignore the frequency dependence of $k_2/Q$. More importantly, they may be inapplicable to viscous binaries (double stars, or double asteroids that are rubble), because the spin–orbit dynamics of such bodies is defined mainly by their viscosity, not rigidity.

== List of known tidally locked bodies ==
=== Solar System ===
All the bodies below are tidally locked, and all but Mercury are moreover in synchronous rotation. (Mercury is tidally locked, but not in synchronous rotation.)

Parent body	Tidally-locked satellites
Sun	Mercury (3:2 spin–orbit resonance)
Earth	Moon
Mars	Phobos · Deimos
Jupiter	Metis · Adrastea · Amalthea · Thebe · Io · Europa · Ganymede · Callisto
Saturn	Pan · Atlas · Prometheus · Pandora · Epimetheus · Janus · Mimas · Enceladus · Telesto · Tethys · Calypso · Dione · Rhea · Titan · Iapetus
Uranus	Miranda · Ariel · Umbriel · Titania · Oberon
Neptune	Proteus · Triton
Pluto	Charon (mutually locked)
Salacia	Actaea (mutually locked)
Eris	Dysnomia (mutually locked)

=== Extra-solar ===
- The most successful detection methods of exoplanets (transits and radial velocities) suffer from a clear observational bias favoring the detection of planets near the star; thus, 85% of the exoplanets detected are inside the tidal locking zone, which makes it difficult to estimate the true incidence of this phenomenon. Tau Boötis is known to be locked to the close-orbiting giant planet Tau Boötis b.

== Bodies likely to be locked ==
=== Solar System ===
Based on comparison between the likely time needed to lock a body to its primary, and the time it has been in its present orbit (comparable with the age of the Solar System for most planetary moons), a number of moons are thought to be locked. However their rotations are not known or not known enough. These are:

==== Probably locked to Saturn ====
- Daphnis
- Aegaeon
- Methone
- Anthe
- Pallene
- Helene
- Polydeuces

==== Probably locked to Uranus ====
- Cordelia
- Ophelia
- Bianca
- Cressida
- Desdemona
- Juliet
- Portia
- Rosalind
- Cupid
- Belinda
- Perdita
- Puck
- Mab

==== Probably locked to Neptune ====
- Naiad
- Thalassa
- Despina
- Galatea
- Larissa

==== Probably mutually tidally locked ====
- Orcus and Vanth

=== Extrasolar ===
- Gliese 581c, Gliese 581b, and Gliese 581e may be tidally locked to their parent star Gliese 581.
- All planets in the TRAPPIST-1 system are likely to be tidally locked.

== See also ==
- Conservation of angular momentum – Conserved physical quantity; rotational analogue of linear momentum
- Gravity-gradient stabilization – Method for the stabilization and the orientation of various spacecraft
- Kozai mechanism – Phenomenon affecting the orbit of a binary system
- Orbital resonance – Regular and periodic mutual gravitational influence of orbiting bodies
- Planetary habitability – Known extent to which a planet is suitable for life
- Pseudo-synchronous rotation – a near synchronization of revolution and rotation at periastron
- Roche limit – Orbital radius at which a satellite might break up due to gravitational force
- Synchronous orbit – Orbit of an astronomical body equal to that body's average rotational period
- Tidal acceleration – Natural phenomenon due to which tidal locking occurs
- Rotation around a fixed axis – Type of motion
