= Moons of Uranus =

Natural satellites of the planet Uranus

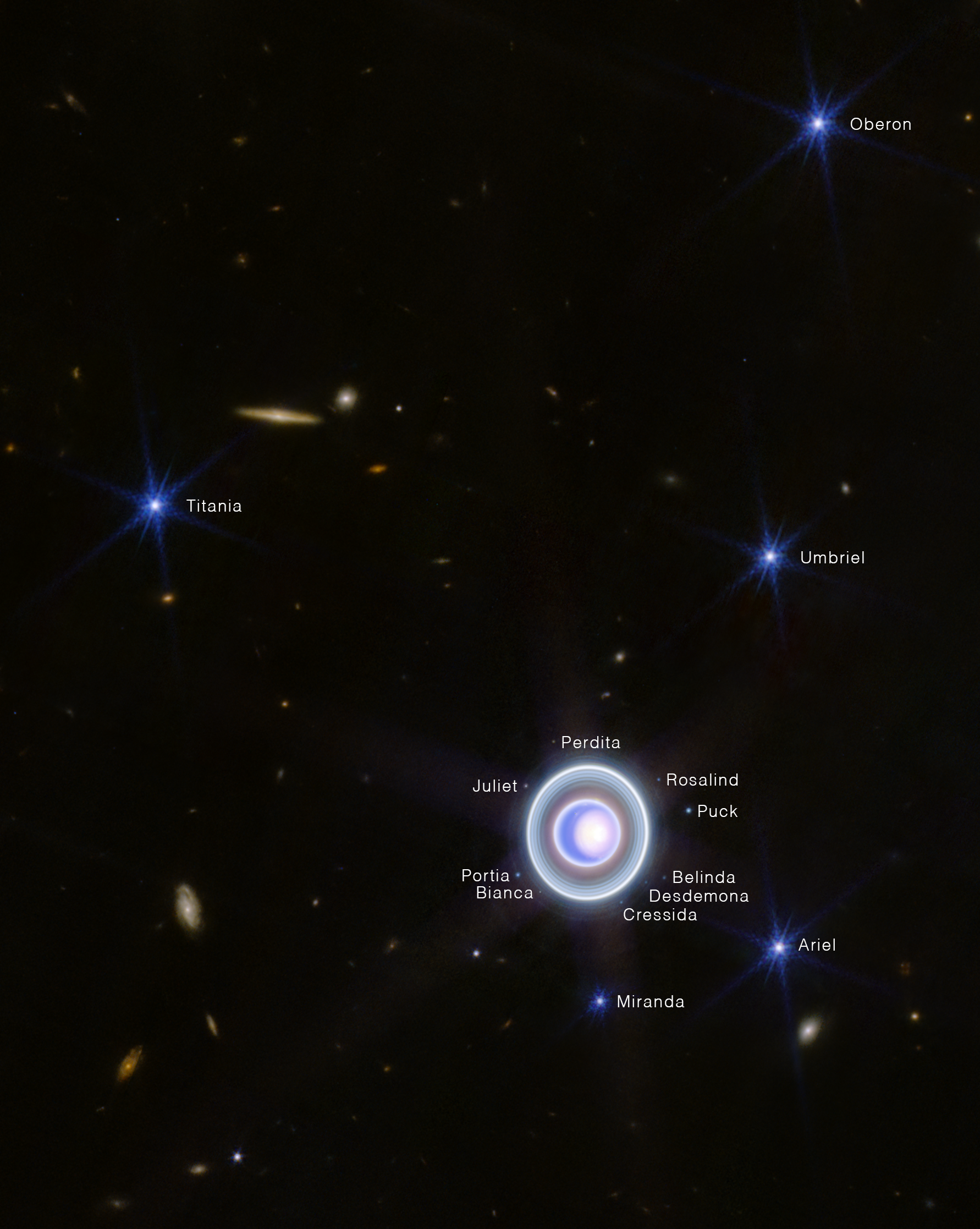
A near-infrared image of the six largest moons and eight largest inner moons of Uranus as captured by the James Webb Space Telescope on 4 September 2023

There are currently 29 known moons of the planet Uranus. The 27 with names are named after characters that appear in, or are mentioned in, William Shakespeare's plays and Alexander Pope's poem The Rape of the Lock. Uranus's moons are divided into three groups: fourteen inner moons, five major moons, and ten irregular moons. The inner and major moons all have prograde orbits and are cumulatively classified as regular moons. In contrast, the orbits of the irregular moons are distant, highly inclined, and mostly retrograde.

The inner moons are small dark bodies that share common properties and origins with Uranus's rings. The five major moons are ellipsoidal, indicating that they reached hydrostatic equilibrium at some point in their past (and may still be in equilibrium), and four of them show signs of internally driven processes such as canyon formation and volcanism on their surfaces. The largest of these five, Titania, is 1,578 km in diameter and the eighth-largest moon in the Solar System, about one-twentieth the mass of the Earth's Moon. The orbits of the regular moons are nearly coplanar with Uranus's equator, which is tilted 97.77° to its orbit. Uranus's irregular moons have elliptical and strongly inclined (mostly retrograde) orbits at large distances from the planet.

William Herschel discovered the first two moons, Titania and Oberon, in 1787. The other three ellipsoidal moons were discovered in 1851 by William Lassell (Ariel and Umbriel) and in 1948 by Gerard Kuiper (Miranda). These five may be in hydrostatic equilibrium. The remaining moons were discovered after 1985, either during the Voyager 2 flyby mission or with the aid of advanced Earth-based telescopes.

== Discovery ==
The first two moons to be discovered were Titania and Oberon, which were spotted by Sir William Herschel on January 11, 1787, six years after he had discovered the planet itself. Later, Herschel thought he had discovered up to six moons (see below) and perhaps even a ring. For nearly 50 years, Herschel's instrument was the only one with which the moons had been seen. In the 1840s, better instruments and a more favorable position of Uranus in the sky led to sporadic indications of satellites additional to Titania and Oberon. Eventually, the next two moons, Ariel and Umbriel, were discovered by William Lassell in 1851. The Roman numbering scheme of Uranus's moons was in a state of flux for a considerable time, and publications hesitated between Herschel's designations (where Titania and Oberon are Uranus II and IV) and William Lassell's (where they are sometimes I and II). With the confirmation of Ariel and Umbriel, Lassell numbered the moons I through IV from Uranus outward, and this finally stuck. In 1852, Herschel's son John Herschel gave the four then-known moons their names.

No other discoveries were made for almost another century. In 1948, Gerard Kuiper at the McDonald Observatory discovered the smallest and the last of the five large, spherical moons, Miranda. Decades later, the flyby of the Voyager 2 space probe in January 1986 led to the discovery of ten further inner moons. Another satellite, Perdita, was discovered in 1999 by Erich Karkoschka after studying old Voyager photographs.

Uranus was the last giant planet without any known irregular moons until 1997, when astronomers using ground-based telescopes discovered Sycorax and Caliban. From 1999 to 2003, astronomers continued searching for irregular moons of Uranus using more powerful ground-based telescopes, resulting in the discovery of seven more Uranian irregular moons. In addition, two small inner moons, Cupid and Mab, were discovered using the Hubble Space Telescope in 2003. No other discoveries were reported until 2024, when Scott Sheppard and colleagues announced the discovery of one irregular moon of Uranus (S/2023 U 1) from 2023 observations by the Subaru Telescope at Mauna Kea, Hawaii.

In August 2025, a team of astronomers led by Maryame El Moutamid at the Southwest Research Institute announced the discovery of a new inner moon of Uranus (Uranus XXVIII) in James Webb Space Telescope images from February 2025. It was not detected earlier by Voyager 2 and the Hubble Space Telescope because it was too small and faint.

=== Spurious moons ===
After Herschel discovered Titania and Oberon on 11 January 1787, he subsequently believed that he had observed four other moons: two on 18 January and 9 February 1790, and two more on 28 February and 26 March 1794. It was thus believed for many decades thereafter that Uranus had a system of six satellites, though the four latter moons were never confirmed by any other astronomer. Lassell's observations of 1851, in which he discovered Ariel and Umbriel, however, failed to support Herschel's observations; Ariel and Umbriel, which Herschel certainly ought to have seen if he had seen any satellites besides Titania and Oberon, did not correspond to any of Herschel's four additional satellites in orbital characteristics. Herschel's four spurious satellites were thought to have sidereal periods of 5.89 days (interior to Titania), 10.96 days (between Titania and Oberon), 38.08 days, and 107.69 days (exterior to Oberon). It was therefore concluded that Herschel's four satellites were spurious, probably arising from the misidentification of faint stars in the vicinity of Uranus as satellites, and the credit for the discovery of Ariel and Umbriel was given to Lassell.

== Names ==
Although the first two Uranian moons were discovered in 1787, they were not named until 1852, a year after two more moons had been discovered. The responsibility for naming was taken by John Herschel, son of the discoverer of Uranus. Herschel, instead of assigning names from Greek mythology, named the moons after magical spirits in English literature: the fairies Oberon and Titania from William Shakespeare's A Midsummer Night's Dream, and the sylph Ariel and gnome Umbriel from Alexander Pope's The Rape of the Lock (Ariel is also a spirit in Shakespeare's The Tempest). It is uncertain if John Herschel was the originator of the names, or if it was instead William Lassell (who discovered Ariel and Umbriel) who chose the names and asked Herschel for permission.

Subsequent names, rather than continuing the airy spirits theme (only Puck and Mab continued the trend), have focused on Herschel's source material. In 1949, the fifth moon, Miranda, was named by its discoverer Gerard Kuiper after a human character in Shakespeare's The Tempest. The current IAU practice is to name moons after characters from Shakespeare's plays and The Rape of the Lock (although at present only Ariel, Umbriel, and Belinda have names drawn from the latter; all the rest are from Shakespeare). The outer retrograde moons are all named after characters from one play, The Tempest; the sole known outer prograde moon, Margaret, is named from Much Ado About Nothing.

Some asteroids, also named after the same Shakespearean characters, share names with moons of Uranus: 171 Ophelia, 218 Bianca, 593 Titania, 666 Desdemona, 763 Cupido, and 2758 Cordelia.

== Characteristics and groups ==
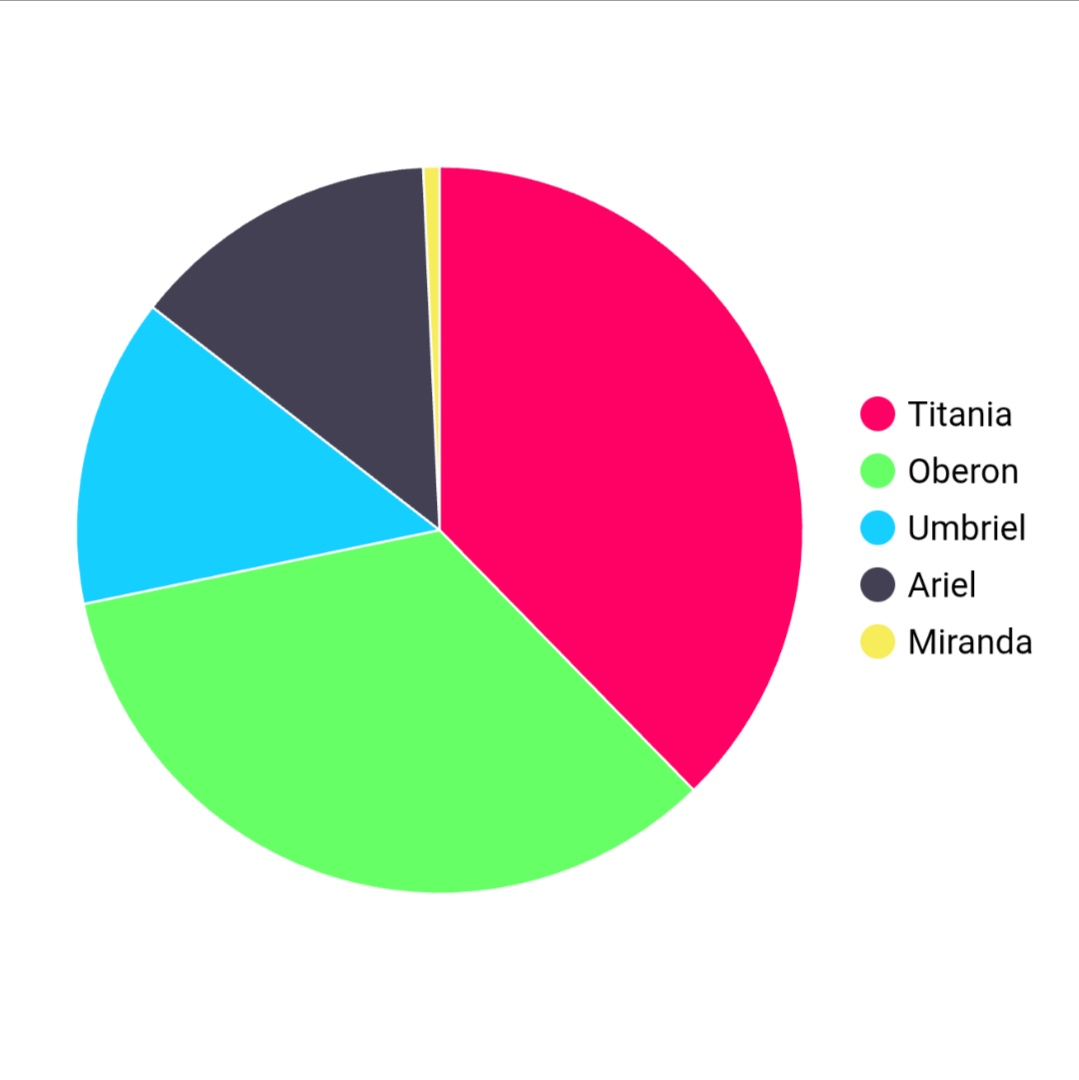
Pie chart showing the relative masses of the 5 major (rounded) Uranian moons

The Uranian satellite system is the least massive among those of the giant planets. Indeed, the combined mass of the five major satellites is less than half that of Triton (the seventh-largest moon in the Solar System) alone. (Note: The mass of Triton is about 2.14 × 10^{22} kg, whereas the combined mass of the Uranian moons is about 0.92 × 10^{22} kg.) The largest of the satellites, Titania, has a radius of 788.9 km, or less than half that of the Moon, but slightly more than that of Rhea, the second-largest moon of Saturn, making Titania the eighth-largest moon in the Solar System. Uranus is about 10,000 times more massive than its moons. (Note: Uranus mass of 8.681 × 10^{25} kg / Mass of Uranian moons of 0.93 × 10^{22} kg)

=== Inner moons ===
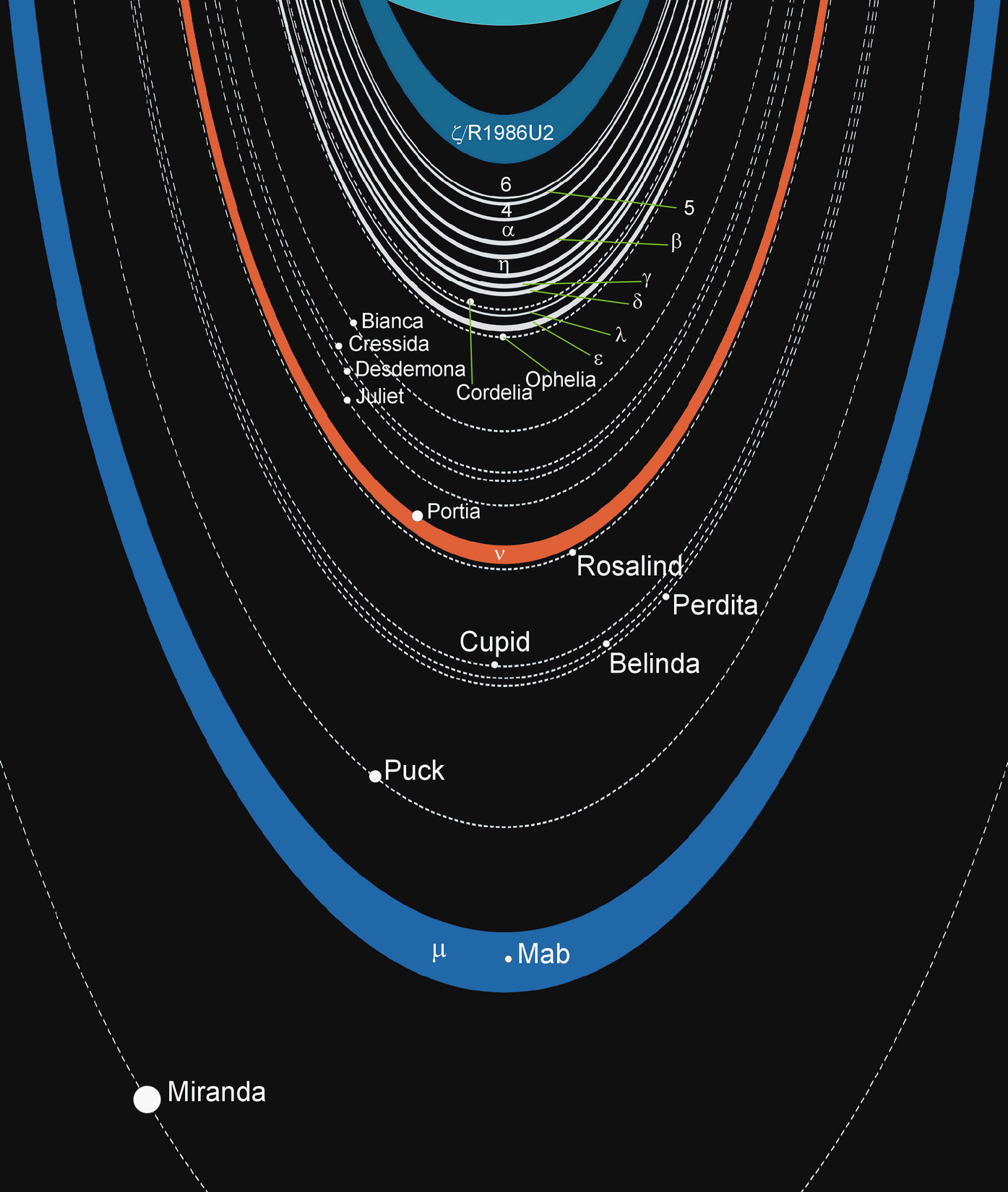
Schematic of the Uranian moon–ring system, excluding Uranus XXVIII, which was not known at the time of drawing

As of 2026, Uranus is known to have 14 inner moons, whose orbits all lie inside that of Miranda. Some of the inner moons are classified into two groups based on similar orbital distances: these are the Portia group, which includes the six moons Bianca, Cressida, Desdemona, Juliet, Portia, and Rosalind; and the Belinda group, which includes the three moons Cupid, Belinda, and Perdita. Uranus XXVIII, which orbits between Ophelia and Bianca, is not classified into either of these groups. All of the inner moons are intimately connected with the rings of Uranus, which probably resulted from the fragmentation of one or several small inner moons. The two innermost moons, Cordelia and Ophelia, are shepherds of Uranus's ε ring, whereas the small moon Mab is a source of Uranus's outermost μ ring. There may be two additional small (2–7 km in radius) undiscovered shepherd moons located about 100 km exterior to Uranus's α and β rings.

At 162 km, Puck is the largest of the inner moons of Uranus and the only one imaged by Voyager 2 in any detail. Puck and Mab are the two outermost inner satellites of Uranus. All inner moons are dark objects; their geometrical albedo is less than 10%. They are composed of water ice contaminated with a dark material, probably radiation-processed organics.

The inner moons constantly perturb each other, especially within the closely-packed Portia and Belinda groups. The system is chaotic and apparently unstable. Simulations show that the moons may perturb each other into crossing orbits, which may eventually result in collisions between the moons. Desdemona may collide with Cressida within the next million years, and Cupid will likely collide with Belinda in the next 10 million years; Perdita and Juliet may be involved in later collisions. Because of this, the rings and inner moons may be under constant flux, with moons colliding and re-accreting on short timescales.

=== Large moons ===
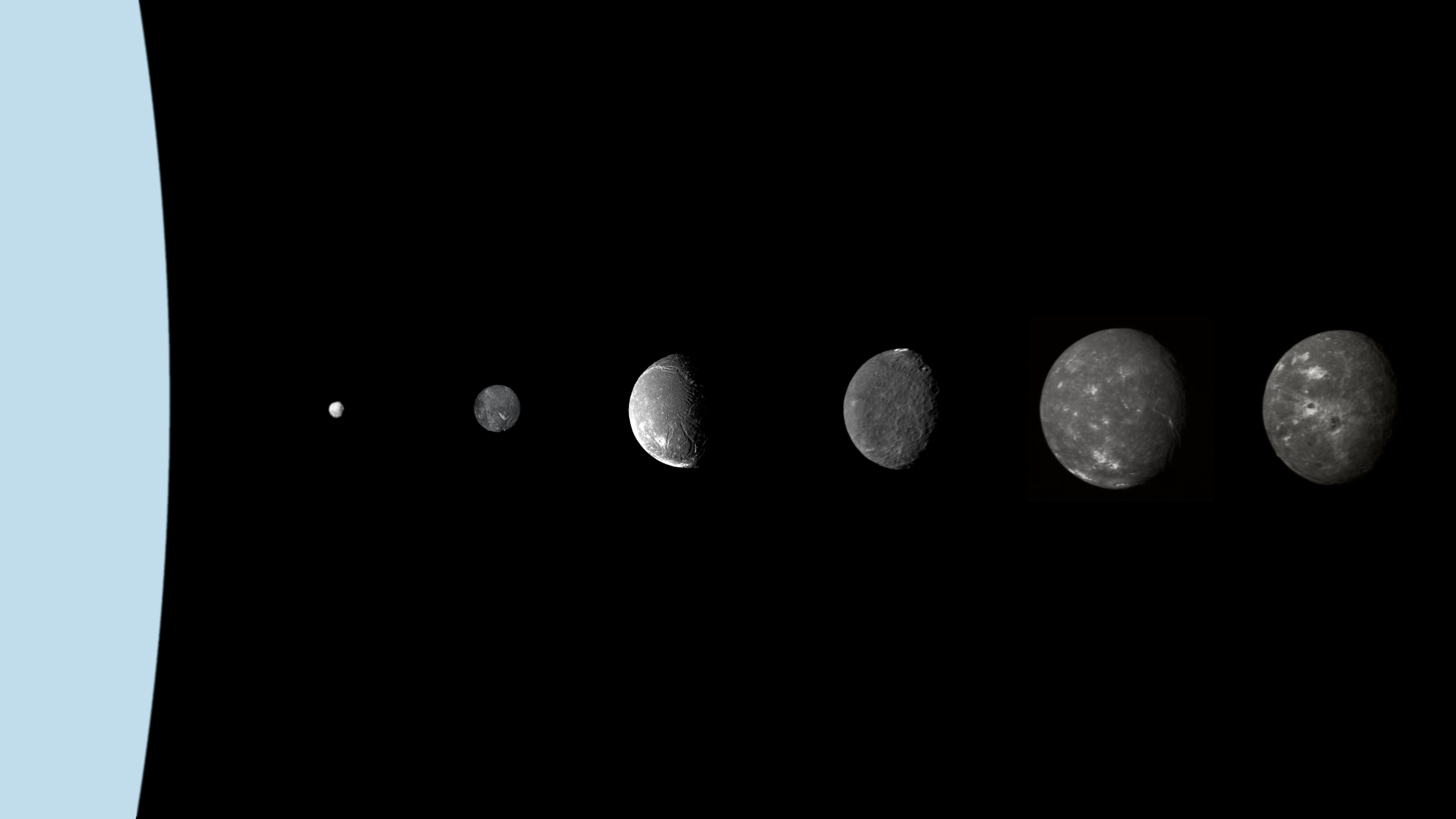
Uranus and its six largest moons compared at their proper relative sizes and in the correct order. From left to right: Puck, Miranda, Ariel, Umbriel, Titania, and Oberon

Uranus has five major moons: Miranda, Ariel, Umbriel, Titania, and Oberon. They range in diameter from 472 km for Miranda to 1578 km for Titania. All these moons are relatively dark objects: their geometrical albedo varies between 30 and 50%, whereas their Bond albedo is between 10 and 23%. Umbriel is the darkest moon and Ariel the brightest. The masses of the moons range from 6.7 × 10^{19} kg (Miranda) to 3.5 × 10^{21} kg (Titania). For comparison, the Moon has a mass of 7.5 × 10^{22} kg and a diameter of 3474 km. The major moons of Uranus are thought to have formed in the accretion disc, which existed around Uranus for some time after its formation or resulted from a large impact suffered by Uranus early in its history. This view is supported by their large thermal inertia, a surface property they share with dwarf planets like Pluto and Haumea. It differs strongly from the thermal behaviour of the Uranian irregular moons that is comparable to classical trans-Neptunian objects. This suggests a separate origin.

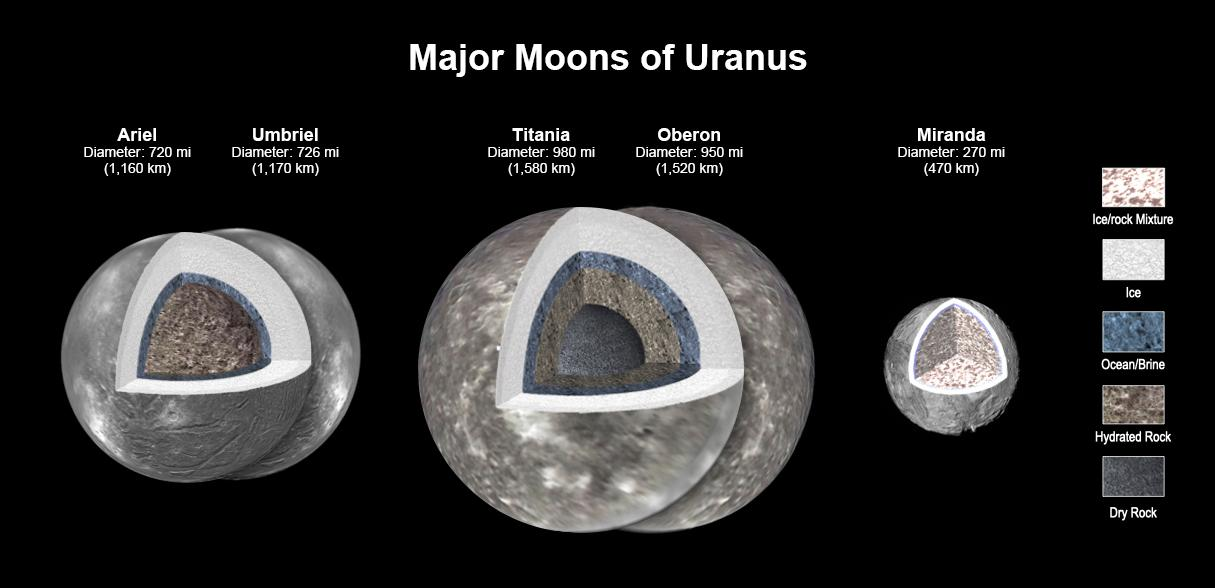
Moons (Ariel, Umbriel, Titania, Oberon, Miranda) Modeling (4 May 2023)

All major moons comprise approximately equal amounts rock and ice, except Miranda, which is made primarily of ice. The ice component may include ammonia and carbon dioxide. Their surfaces are heavily cratered, though all of them (except Umbriel) show signs of endogenic resurfacing in the form of lineaments (canyons) and, in the case of Miranda, ovoid race-track like structures called coronae. Extensional processes associated with upwelling diapirs are likely responsible for the origin of the coronae. Ariel appears to have the youngest surface with the fewest impact craters, while Umbriel's appears oldest. A past 3:1 orbital resonance between Miranda and Umbriel and a past 4:1 resonance between Ariel and Titania are thought to be responsible for the heating that caused substantial endogenic activity on Miranda and Ariel. One piece of evidence for such a past resonance is Miranda's unusually high orbital inclination (4.34°) for a body so close to the planet. The largest Uranian moons may be internally differentiated, with rocky cores at their centers surrounded by ice mantles. Titania and Oberon may harbor liquid water oceans at the core/mantle boundary. The major moons of Uranus are airless bodies. For instance, Titania was shown to possess no atmosphere at a pressure larger than 10–20 nanobar.

The path of the Sun in the local sky over the course of a local day during Uranus's and its major moons' summer solstice is quite different from that seen on most other Solar System worlds. The major moons have almost exactly the same rotational axial tilt as Uranus (their axes are parallel to that of Uranus). The Sun would appear to follow a circular path around Uranus's celestial pole in the sky, at the closest about 7 degrees from it, (Note: The axial tilt of Uranus is 97°.) during the hemispheric summer. Near the equator, it would be seen nearly due north or due south (depending on the season). At latitudes higher than 7°, the Sun would trace a circular path about 15 degrees in diameter in the sky, and never set during the hemispheric summer, moving to a position over the celestial equator during the Uranian equinox, and then invisible below the horizon during the hemispheric winter.

=== Irregular moons ===
Uranus's irregular moons range in size from 120 to 200 km (Sycorax) to under 10 km (S/2023 U 1). Five of these moons have had their rotation periods measured, and on average, those in the Uranian system rotate faster than irregular moons around other giant planets. This may reflect a history of more frequent or more energetic collisions within the Uranian system.

Due to the small number of known Uranian irregular moons, it is not yet clear which of them belong to groups with similar orbital characteristics. The only known group among Uranus's irregular moons is the Caliban group, which is clustered at orbital distances between 6–7 million km (3.7–4.3 million mi) and inclinations between 141–144°. The Caliban group includes three retrograde moons, which are Caliban, S/2023 U 1, and Stephano. Beyond that, there is also a statistically significant division of its retrograde moons into two broad categories: those with smaller, more circular orbits and those with larger, more eccentric orbits. However, the inclinations are distributed more or less randomly.

Uranus is somewhat unique in that its retrograde moons do not orbit as far from the planet as those of the other giant planets, and only has one prograde irregular. Margaret is the only known irregular prograde moon of Uranus, and it has one of the most eccentric orbits of any moon in the Solar System.

The intermediate inclinations 60° < i < 140° are devoid of known moons due to the Kozai instability. In this instability region, solar perturbations at apoapse cause the moons to acquire large eccentricities that lead to collisions with inner satellites or ejection. The lifetime of moons in the instability region is from 10 million to a billion years.

The orbits of Uranian irregular moons as seen from three different views. Prograde irregular moons are colored blue, retrograde irregular moons are colored red, and regular moons are colored magenta. Data as of 2026.

== List of moons ==
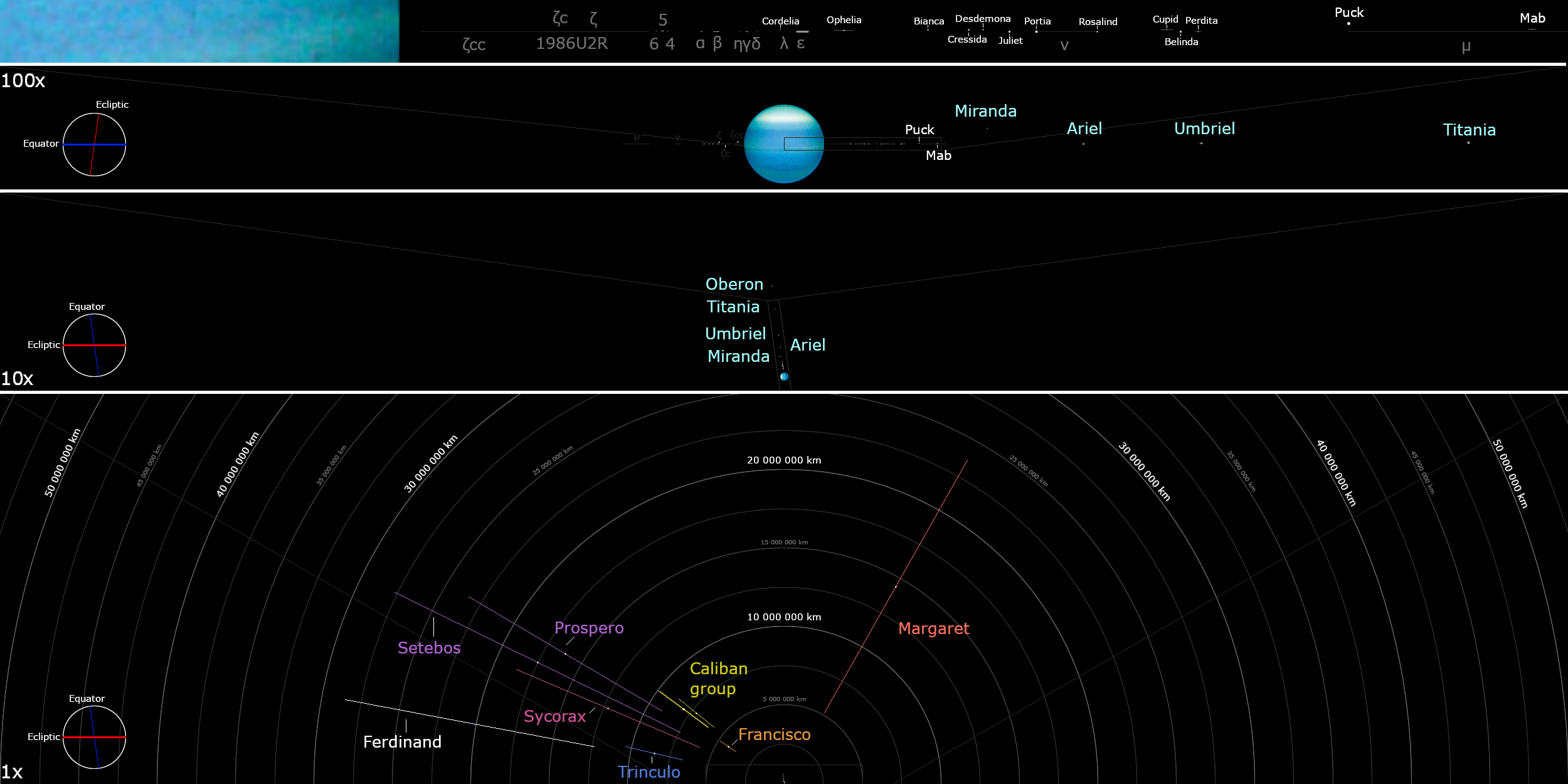
Orbital diagram of the orbital inclination and orbital distances for Uranus's rings and moon system at various scales. Open the image for full resolution.

The Uranian moons are listed here by orbital period, from shortest to longest. Moons massive enough for their surfaces to have collapsed into a spheroid are highlighted in light blue and bolded. The inner and major moons all have prograde orbits. Irregular moons with retrograde orbits are shown in dark grey. Margaret, the only known irregular moon of Uranus with a prograde orbit, is shown in light grey. The orbits and mean distances of the irregular moons are variable over short timescales due to frequent planetary and solar perturbations, therefore the listed orbital elements of all irregular moons are averaged over a 10,000-year numerical integration by Sheppard et al. (2024). These may differ from osculating orbital elements provided by other sources. The orbital elements of the inner moons listed here are based on the epoch of 1 January 2025; those for the major moons are based on the epoch of 1 January 2000; while orbital elements of irregular satellites are based on the epoch of 1 January 2020.

Key
Inner moons (14)	♠ **Major moons** (5)	♦ Caliban group (3)
† Margaret (1)	‡ Ungrouped retrograde irregular moons (6)	

Uranian moons
Label (Note: Label refers to the Roman numeral attributed to each moon in order of their discovery.)	Name	Pronunciation (key)	Image	Abs. magn. (Note: Absolute magnitudes of the major moons, Puck, Cordelia, and Ophelia are from Karkoschka, 2001. Those of the other inner satellites are calculated from the geometric albedos from the assumed diameters given in their respective Wikipedia articles. Absolute magnitudes of irregular satellites were taken from the Minor Planet Center's Natural Satellites Ephemeris Service.)	Diameter (km) (Note: Diameters with multiple entries such as "60 × 40 × 34" reflect that the body is not a perfect spheroid and that each of its dimensions have been measured well enough. The diameters and dimensions of Miranda, Ariel, Umbriel, and Oberon were taken from Thomas, 1988. The diameter of Titania is from Widemann, 2009. The diameters and dimensions of the inner moons are derived from Karkoschka, 2001, except for Cupid, Perdita, Mab, and Uranus XXVIII. The radii of Cupid, Perdita, and Mab were taken from Showalter, 2006. The dimensions of Uranus XXVIII are a calculated estimate. The radii of outer moons except Sycorax, Caliban, and S/2023 U 1 were taken from Sheppard's website. The radii of Sycorax and Caliban are from Farkas-Takács et al., 2017. The dimensions of S/2023 U 1 are a calculated estimate.)	Mass (× 10^{16} kg) (Note: Masses of the five major moons were taken from Jacobson & Park, 2025. Masses of Cordelia, Ophelia, and Cressida were taken from French, 2024. Masses of all other moons were calculated assuming a density of 1 g/cm^{3} and using given radii.)	Semi-major axis (km) (Note: Mean orbits of the inner and irregular satellites, other than Puck, are taken from JPL Small System Dynamics, while mean orbits of the five major moons and Puck are taken from Jacobson & Park (2025).)	Orbital period (d) (Note: Negative orbital periods indicate a retrograde orbit around Uranus (opposite to the planet's orbit). Orbital periods of irregular satellites may not be consistent with their semi-major axes due to perturbations.)	Inclination (°) (Note: Inclinations greater than 90° are retrograde. Orbital inclinations of inner satellites, other than Puck, are with respect to their Laplace planes. For the major satellites and Puck, inclination measures the angle between the moon's orbital plane and the plane defined by Uranus's equator. For irregular satellites, inclination measures the angle between the moon's orbital plane and the ecliptic.)	Eccentricity	Discovery year	Year announced	Discoverer	Group
VI	Cordelia	/kɔːrˈdiːliə/		10.9	39.6 (50 × 36)	6.08±0.57	49755	+0.3347	0.2	0.000	1986	1986	Terrile (Voyager 2)	ε ring shepherd
VII	Ophelia	/oʊˈfiːliə/		10.5	43.3 (54 × 38)	3.57±0.32	53765	+0.3764	0.2	0.011	1986	1986	Terrile (Voyager 2)	ε ring shepherd
XXVIII	S/2025 U 1			≈ 13.6	≈ 8–10	≈ 0.04	57844	+0.4201	4.0	0.039	2025	2025	El Moutamid et al. (JWST)	
VIII	Bianca	/biˈɑːŋkə/		9.9	50.9 (64 × 46)	≈ 6.9	59170	+0.4347	2.3	0.006	1986	1986	Smith (Voyager 2)	Portia
IX	Cressida	/ˈkrɛsədə/		9.0	79.0 (92 × 74)	18.39±2.12	61770	+0.4639	1.8	0.004	1986	1986	Synnott (Voyager 2)	Portia
X	Desdemona	/ˌdɛzdəˈmoʊnə/		9.1	64.3 (90 × 54)	≈ 14	62663	+0.4736	3.1	0.007	1986	1986	Synnott (Voyager 2)	Portia
XI	Juliet	/ˈdʒuːliət/		8.3	94.4 (150 × 74)	≈ 44	64362	+0.4931	3.0	0.006	1986	1986	Synnott (Voyager 2)	Portia
XII	Portia	/ˈpɔːrʃə/		7.8	134.9 (156 × 126)	≈ 130	66101	+0.5132	2.7	0.004	1986	1986	Synnott (Voyager 2)	Portia
XIII	Rosalind	/ˈrɒzələnd/		9.2	72 ± 12	≈ 20	69930	+0.5583	1.7	0.003	1986	1986	Synnott (Voyager 2)	Portia
XXVII	Cupid	/ˈkjuːpəd/		12.3	17.8 ± 1.4	≈ 0.30	74396	+0.6125	2.0	0.007	2003	2003	Showalter and Lissauer (HST)	Belinda
XIV	Belinda	/bəˈlɪndə/		8.8	80.2 (128 × 64)	≈ 27	75258	+0.6236	1.4	0.002	1986	1986	Synnott (Voyager 2)	Belinda
XXV	Perdita	/ˈpɜːrdətə/		11.4	26.6 ± 1.4	≈ 0.99	76418	+0.6382	1.6	0.005	1999	1999	Karkoschka (Voyager 2)	Belinda
XV	Puck	/ˈpʌk/		7.0	162 ± 4	≈ 220	86004	+0.76183	0.327	0.0001	1985	1986	Synnott (Voyager 2)	
XXVI	Mab	/ˈmæb/		11.1	≈ 12	≈ 0.09	97737	+0.9229	1.8	0.006	2003	2003	Showalter and Lissauer (HST)	μ ring source
V	**Miranda**^{♠}	/məˈrændə/		3.1	471.6 ± 1.4 (481 × 468 × 466)	6160±160	129846	+1.4135	4.421	0.0014	1948	1948	Kuiper	
I	**Ariel**^{♠}	/ˈɛəriɛl/		1.0	1157.8±1.2 (1162 × 1156 × 1155)	125000±840	190929	+2.5204	0.026	0.0014	1851	1851	Lassell	
II	**Umbriel**^{♠}	/ˈʌmbriəl/		1.8	1164.8±1.6	128000±1000	265986	+4.1442	0.083	0.0039	1851	1851	Lassell	
III	**Titania**^{♠}	/təˈtɑːniə/		0.8	1576.8±1.2	333820±2170	436298	+8.7059	0.114	0.0016	1787	1787	Herschel	
IV	**Oberon**^{♠}	/ˈoʊbərɒn/		1.0	1522.8±5.2	320950±3210	583511	+13.463	0.125	0.0016	1787	1787	Herschel	
XXII	Francisco^{‡}	/frænˈsɪskoʊ/		12.9	≈ 22	≈ 0.56	4275700	−267	146.8	0.144	2001	2003	Holman et al.	
XVI	Caliban^{♦}	/ˈkæləbæn/		8.9	42+20 −12	≈ 3.9	7167000	−580	141.4	0.200	1997	1997	Gladman et al.	Caliban
XX	Stephano^{♦}	/ˈstɛfənoʊ/		11.6	≈ 32	≈ 1.7	7951400	−677	143.6	0.235	1999	1999	Gladman et al.	Caliban
	S/2023 U 1^{♦}			13.7	≈ 8	≈ 0.027	7976600	−681	143.9	0.250	2023	2024	Sheppard et al.	Caliban
XXI	Trinculo^{‡}	/ˈtrɪŋkjʊloʊ/		12.7	≈ 18	≈ 0.31	8502600	−749	167.1	0.220	2001	2002	Holman et al.	
XVII	Sycorax^{‡}	/ˈsɪkəræks/		7.5	157+23 −15	≈ 200	12193200	−1286	157.0	0.520	1997	1997	Nicholson et al.	
XXIII	Margaret^{†}	/ˈmɑːrɡərət/		12.7	≈ 20	≈ 0.42	14425000	+1655	60.5	0.642	2003	2003	Sheppard and Jewitt	
XVIII	Prospero^{‡}	/ˈprɒspəroʊ/		10.6	≈ 50	≈ 6.5	16221000	−1974	149.4	0.441	1999	1999	Holman et al.	
XIX	Setebos^{‡}	/ˈsɛtɛbʌs/		10.6	≈ 47	≈ 5.4	17519800	−2215	153.9	0.579	1999	1999	Kavelaars et al.	
XXIV	Ferdinand^{‡}	/ˈfɜːrdənænd/		12.4	≈ 21	≈ 0.48	20421400	−2788	169.2	0.395	2001	2003	Holman et al.	

== See also ==
- List of natural satellites
