= Inner moon =

Natural satellite orbiting inside the orbit of a larger moon

In astronomy, an inner moon or inner natural satellite is a natural satellite following a prograde, low-inclination orbit inwards of the large satellites of the parent planet. They are generally thought to have been formed in situ at the same time as the coalescence of the original planet. Neptune's moons are an exception, as they are likely reaggregates of the pieces of the original bodies, which were disrupted after the capture of the large moon Triton. Inner satellites are distinguished from other regular satellites by their proximity to the parent planet, their short orbital periods (usually under a day), their low mass, small size, and irregular shapes.

A similar and related term is ring moon, for moons that dynamically interact with a planet's rings. Many inner moons are also ring moons.

== Discovery ==
Thirty-five inner satellites are currently known, found orbiting around all four of the giant planets (Jupiter, Saturn, Uranus and Neptune). Because of their small size, and glare from the nearby planet, they can be very difficult to observe from Earth. Some, such as Pan and Daphnis at Saturn, have only ever been observed by spacecraft.

The first inner satellite to be observed was Amalthea, discovered by E. E. Barnard in 1892. Next were the Saturnian moons Epimetheus and Janus, observed in 1966. These two moons share the same orbit, and the resulting confusion over their status was not resolved until the Voyager 1 flyby in 1980. Most of the remaining inner satellites were discovered by spacecraft Voyager 1 and Voyager 2 during their flybys of Jupiter (1979), Saturn (1980/1981), Uranus (1986) and Neptune (1989).

In more recent years, further inner satellites have been found orbiting Saturn (by the Cassini spacecraft from 2005 to 2009), Uranus (by the Hubble Space Telescope in 2003 and the James Webb Space Telescope in 2025), and Neptune (by Hubble in 2013).

== Orbits ==
All inner satellites follow nearly circular, prograde orbits. The median eccentricity is 0.0012, while the most eccentric inner satellite is Thebe with e=0.0177. Their inclination to their planets' equatorial planes is also very low. All but one have inclinations below one degree, the median being 0.1°. Naiad, Neptune's closest moon, is the exception, being inclined at 4.75° to Neptune's equator.

The innermost satellites orbit within the planetary rings, well within the fluid Roche limit, and only the internal strength and friction of their materials prevents them from being torn apart by tidal forces. This means that, if a pebble were placed in the part of the satellite furthest away from the planet, the tidal force outward is stronger than the satellite's gravity planetward, so the pebble would fall upward. This is why photos of these satellites show them to be completely clean of pebbles, dust and rocks.

The most extreme cases are Saturn's moon Pan, which orbits within the rings at only 70% of its fluid Roche limit, as well as Neptune's moon Naiad. Naiad's density is unknown, so its precise Roche limit is also unknown, but if its density were below 1100 kg/m^{3} it would lie at an even smaller fraction of its Roche limit than Pan.

Those satellites which have an orbital period shorter than their planet's rotation period experience tidal deceleration, causing a very gradual spiraling in towards the planet. In the distant future these moons will impact the planet or penetrate deeply enough within their Roche limit to be tidally disrupted into fragments. The moons so affected are Metis and Adrastea at Jupiter, and the majority of the inner moons of Uranus and Neptune − out to and including Perdita and Larissa, respectively. However, none of Saturn's moons experience this effect because Saturn is a relatively very fast rotator.

== Physical characteristics ==
=== Dimensions ===
The inner satellites are small in comparison with the major moons of their respective planets. All are too small to have attained a gravitationally-collapsed spheroidal shape. Many are highly elongated, such as for example, Amalthea, which is twice as long as wide. By far the largest of the inner satellites is Proteus, which is about 440 km across in its longest dimension and close to spherical, but not spherical enough to be considered a gravitationally collapsed shape. Proteus is larger than Mimas, the smallest known round satellite. Most known inner satellites are 50 to 200 km across, while the smallest confirmed is Daphnis at 6 to 8 km in size. (Aegaeon is even smaller at 0.66±0.12 km across, but is not large enough to clear a channel in the rings, as Daphnis does.) Unconfirmed bodies orbiting close to Saturn's F ring, such as S/2004 S 6, may be somewhat smaller moons, if they are not transient clumps of dust instead. The Cassini spacecraft has recently found indications (small dusty rings) that even smaller moonlets may be orbiting in the Cassini Division. The size of the smallest known inner moons around the outer planets increases with distance from the Sun, but this trend is thought to be due to increasingly difficult lighting and observing conditions rather than any physical trend. Smaller inner moons may eventually be discovered.

=== Rotation ===
Inner satellites are all tidally locked, that is, their orbit is synchronous with their rotation so that they only show one face toward their parent planet. Their long axes are typically aligned to point towards their planet.

=== Surfaces ===
All the inner satellites of Jupiter, Uranus, and Neptune have very dark surfaces with an albedo between 0.06 (Metis) and 0.10 (Adrastea). Saturn's satellites, in contrast, have very bright surfaces, with albedos between 0.4 and 0.6. This is thought to be because their surfaces are being coated with fresh ice particles swept up from the ring system within which they orbit. The inner satellites around the other planets may have been darkened by space weathering. None of the known inner satellites possesses an atmosphere.

=== Cratering ===
The inner satellites that have been imaged show heavily cratered surfaces. The cratering rate for bodies orbiting close to giant planets is greater than for the main and outer moons because of gravitational focusing: Sun-orbiting bodies which pass into a large region in the vicinity of a giant planet are preferentially deflected towards the planet by its gravitational field, so that the frequency of potential impactors passing through a given cross-sectional area close to the planet is much greater than in interplanetary space. As a result, it has been estimated that very small bodies in inner orbits are expected to be disrupted by external impactors on a timescale much shorter than the age of the Solar System. This would place a lower limit on the size of the inner moons that remain.

=== Accumulation of ring material ===
At least two of Saturn's inner moons (Atlas and Pan) have equatorial ridges. The ridge on Atlas is particularly prominent. Also, Pandora is mantled by some kind of fine deposit. It has been suggested that these features are due to the accretion of ring material onto these moons. Further evidence for such a process may include the low density of these bodies (due, perhaps, to the looseness of material so accumulated), and their high albedo. Prometheus has been seen to attract diffuse material from the F ring during periodic close approaches.

== List of inner satellites ==
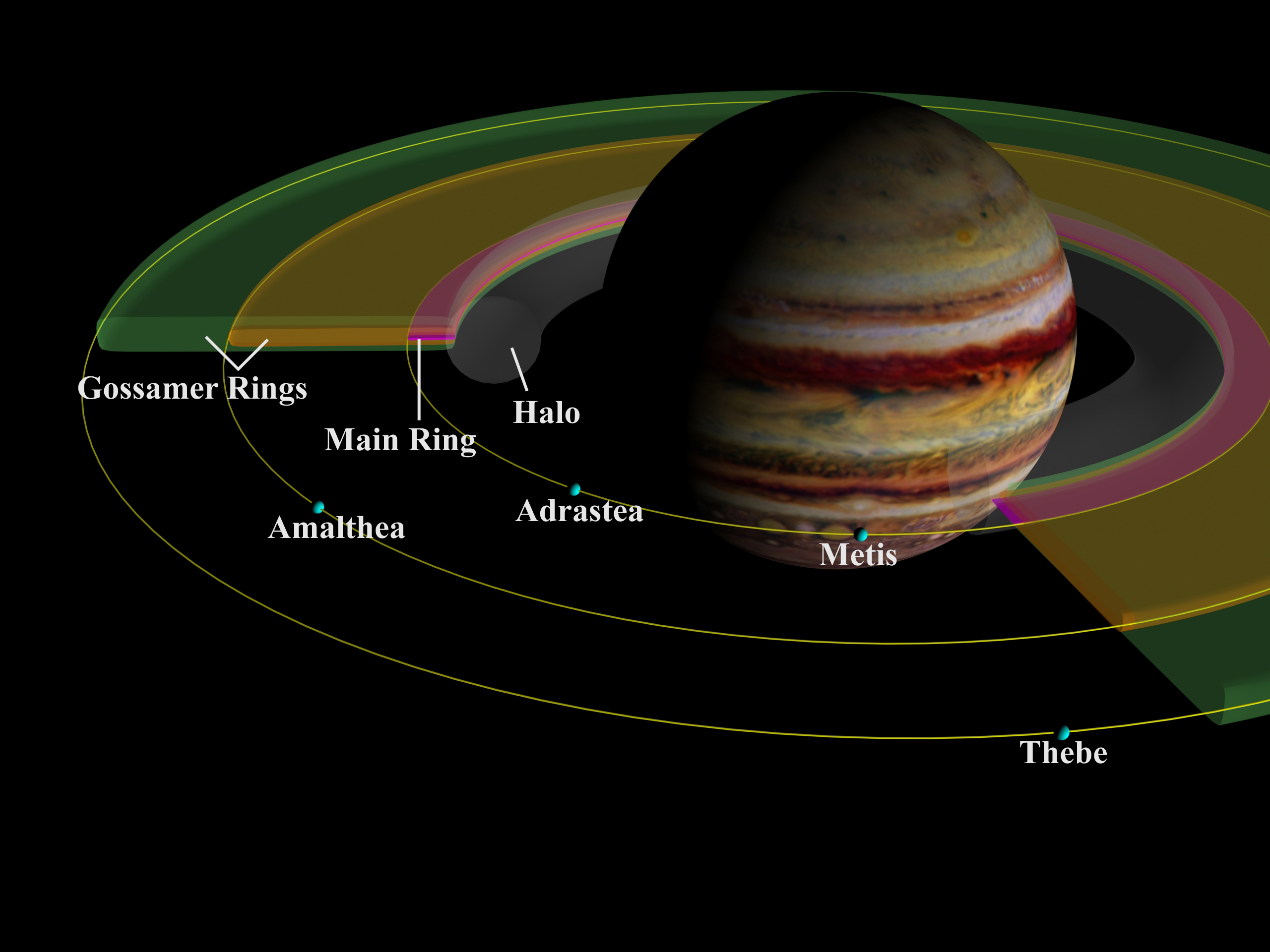
Jupiter's inner moons and rings

=== Inner satellites of Jupiter ===
Jupiter has the smallest set of inner satellites, including only the following four:

- Metis
- Adrastea
- Amalthea
- Thebe

The Galileo spacecraft may have observed some moonlets near Amalthea's orbit.

=== Inner satellites of Saturn ===
Saturn's ten known inner satellites are closely related to its ring system, and many of them orbit within the rings, creating gaps or "shepherded" ringlets between them.

- S/2009 S 1 and S/2009 S 2 – B-ring moonlets
- Pan – shepherd satellite in the Encke division of Saturn's A Ring
- Daphnis – shepherd satellite in the Keeler Gap of Saturn's A Ring
- Atlas – shepherd satellite of the outer edge of Saturn's A Ring
- Prometheus – inner shepherd satellite of Saturn's narrow F Ring
- Pandora
- Epimetheus and Janus – co-orbital satellites that periodically exchange orbital energy with each other
- Aegaeon – G-ring moonlet

S/2009 S 1 and Aegaeon are not large enough to clear their own channels in the rings. The same is true of the small moons Methone, Anthe, and Pallene, which orbit between the larger Saturnian moons Mimas and Enceladus.

A number of localised objects such as S/2004 S 3, S/2004 S 4, and S/2004 S 6, sometimes surrounded by a dusty halo, have been seen in the vicinity of the F ring, but at present it is not clear whether they are all transient clumps or whether some may include small solid objects (moons).

2008 schematic of the Uranian satellite and ring system

=== Inner satellites of Uranus ===
Uranus has by far the most extensive system of inner satellites, containing fourteen known moons:

- Cordelia and Ophelia – inner and outer shepherd satellites, respectively, for Uranus' brightest ring, the narrow ε ring
- Uranus XXVIII
- Bianca
- Cressida
- Desdemona
- Juliet
- Portia
- Rosalind
- Cupid
- Belinda
- Perdita
- Puck
- Mab – associated with the μ ring

=== Inner satellites of Neptune ===
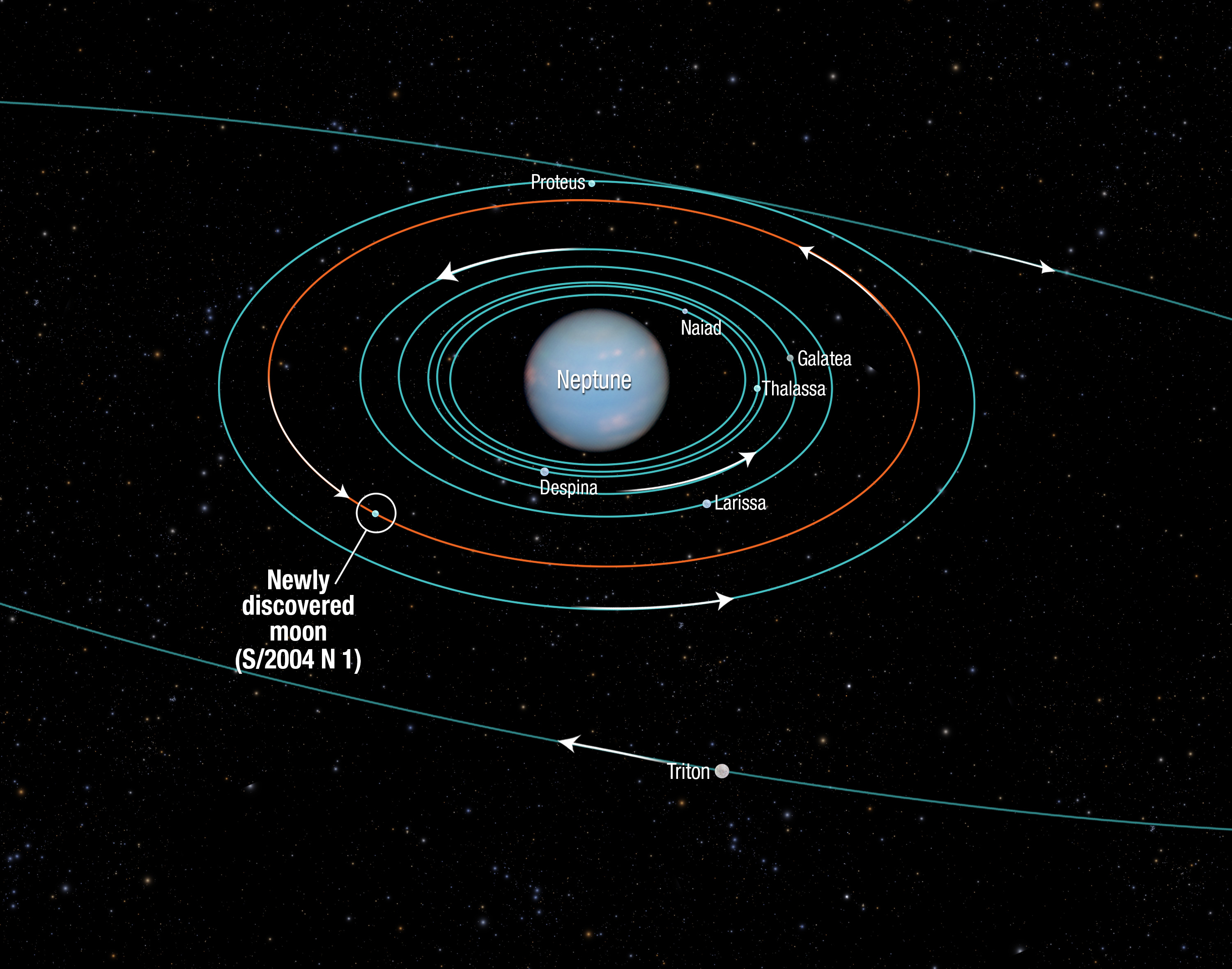
Diagram of Neptune's inner satellites.

Neptune has seven known inner satellites:

- Naiad
- Thalassa
- Despina
- Galatea − inner shepherd satellite of the very narrow Adams ring, which is broken into arcs
- Larissa
- Hippocamp
- Proteus

It is thought that they are rubble piles re-accreted from fragments of Neptune's original satellites (inner or not). These were strongly perturbed by Triton in the period soon after that moon's capture into a very eccentric initial orbit. The perturbations led to collisions between the satellites, and that portion of the fragments that were not lost re-accreted into the present inner satellites after Triton's orbit became circularised.

== Exploration ==
Most of the inner satellites have been imaged by the spacecraft Voyager 1 and Voyager 2. The majority have only been seen in images as single pixels, or resolved to only a few pixels across. However fairly detailed surface features have been seen on the following moons:

Planet	Spacecraft				
Planet	Voyager 1	Voyager 2	Galileo	Cassini	Juno
Jupiter	Amalthea		Amalthea; Thebe		Thebe
Saturn	Pandora; Prometheus; Janus; Epimetheus			Pan; Daphnis; Atlas; Pandora; Prometheus; Janus; Epimetheus	
Uranus		Puck			
Neptune		Larissa; Proteus			
