= Desdemona (disambiguation) =

Desdemona is a character in William Shakespeare's play Othello.

Desdemona may also refer to:

== Fictional characters ==
- Desdemona, a cat character in the comic strip Mutt and Jeff
- Desdemona, a character in the Jimmy Buffett novel Where Is Joe Merchant?
- Desdemona, a character in the book Vurt by author Jeff Noon
- Desdemona, a character in the Midnighters trilogy by the author Scott Westerfeld
- Desdemona, a character in the children's Cairo Jim novels by Geoffrey McSkimming
- Desdemona, a character recreated as Kynaston, played by Billy Crudup in the film Stage Beauty
- Desdemona, a role from Shakespeare's Othello in the film O, renamed "Desi Brable"
- Desdemona, a soprano role in Giuseppe Verdi's opera Otello (1887)
- Desdemona, a soprano role in the 1816 opera Otello by Gioachino Rossini
- Desdemona Stephanides, a character in the book Middlesex by author Jeffrey Eugenides
- Desdemona, a character in the video game Dragon Quest Heroes II
- Desdemona, a character in Lois McMaster Bujold's Penric and Desdemona series

== Music ==
- "Desdemona" (John's Children song), written by Marc Bolan and first recorded by John's Children
- "Desdemona", a song by Billy Merson
- Desdemona (Searchers song), a 1971 single by The Searchers
- "Desdemona", a song by American actor & singer Eddie Murphy from the 1993 album Love's Alright
- "Desdemona", a song by The Allman Brothers from the 2003 album Hittin' the Note
- "Desdemona", a song by The Kids from "Fame"
- "Desdemona", a song by American Football from the 2026 album American Football

== Space ==
- 666 Desdemona, an asteroid
- Desdemona (moon), a moon of Uranus

== Other uses ==
- Desdemona (play), by Toni Morrison, 2011
- Desdemona: A Play About a Handkerchief,, by Paula Vogel, 1993
- Desdemona, Texas, a ghost town in Eastland, Texas
- ST Desdemona, a Cypriot tugboat
