= Phase integral =

Phase integral may refer to:

- Phase integral, in statistical mechanics, a classical analog to the partition function.
- Phase integral, in astronomy, a concept related to bond albedo.
