= Portia (moon) =

Moon of Uranus

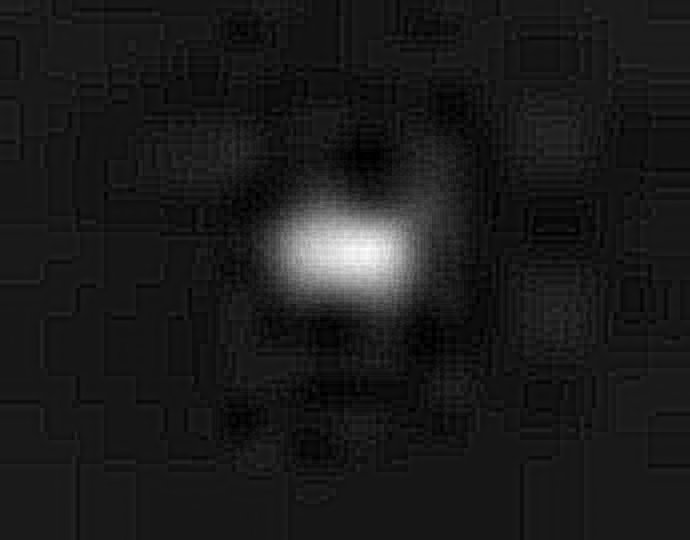

Discovery
- Discovered by: Stephen P. Synnott / Voyager 2
- Discovery date: January 3, 1986

Designations
- Designation: Uranus XII
- Pronunciation: /ˈpɔːrʃə/
- Adjectives: Portian /ˈpɔːrʃən/

Orbital characteristics
- Epoch 2008-09-01 00:00:00 UTC
- Semi-major axis: 66097.314 km
- Eccentricity: 0.00051
- Orbital period (sidereal): 0.513 d (calculated)
- Average orbital speed: 9.36 km/s (calculated)
- Inclination: 0.01643° (to Uranus's equator)
- Satellite of: Uranus

Physical characteristics
- Dimensions: 156 × 126 × 126 km (Note: The satellite's shape was modelled as a prolate spheroid (a × b × b); thus, only constraints for two axes were determined (a × b = 78 × 63 km).)
- Mean radius: 67.4±4.1 km (Note: This is the geometric mean of the three axes ($\sqrt[3]{a\cdot b\cdot b}$), calculated from $\sqrt{ab}$ = 70±4 km and $b/a$ = 0.8±0.1. However, various sources use 70±4 km or 78 × 63 km as the radius value or cross section size instead.)
- Volume: 1296800 km^{3} ± 14.8%
- Mass: (1.1671±0.1730)×10^{18} kg
- Mean density: 0.5–1.2 g/cm^{3} 0.9 g/cm^{3} (assumed)
- Synodic rotation period: synchronous (presumed)
- Axial tilt: zero (assumed)
- Albedo: 0.069 ± 0.008 (geometric); 0.026 ± 0.005 (Bond)
- Apparent magnitude: 20.35–20.48 (± 0.05) (at opposition)
- Absolute magnitude (H): 7.64–7.77 (± 0.05)

Portia is an inner satellite of Uranus. It was discovered from the images taken by Voyager 2 on 3 January 1986, and was given the temporary designation S/1986 U 1. The moon is named after Portia, the heroine of William Shakespeare's play The Merchant of Venice. It is also designated Uranus XII.

Portia is the second-largest inner satellite of Uranus after Puck. The Portian orbit, which lies inside Uranus's synchronous orbital radius, is slowly decaying due to tidal deceleration. The moon will one day either break up into a planetary ring or hit Uranus.

It is the largest member and the namesake of a group of satellites called the Portia group, which includes Bianca, Cressida, Desdemona, Juliet, Rosalind, Cupid, Belinda, and Perdita. These satellites have similar orbits and photometric properties.

Little is known about Portia beyond its dimensions of about 156 km × 126 km (97 mi × 78 mi), orbit, and geometric albedo of about 0.069.

In Voyager 2 imagery, Portia appears as an elongated object whose major axis points towards Uranus. The ratio of axes of Portia's prolate spheroid is 0.8 ± 0.1. Its surface is grey or slightly reddish in color. Fellow Portia group members Juliet, Belinda, Cressida, Desdemona, and Rosalind have particularly similar spectra to Portia.

Studies have come to mixed conclusions on the presence of water ice on Portia. Observations with the Hubble Space Telescope in 1997 found a small dip in the spectra of the Portia group moons, tentatively suggested to be of water ice. Another group reported results on Portia individually, observing with the Hubble Space Telescope in 1998. Portia's orbital motion moved it out of the camera's view before observations were complete. However, they found that Portia's partial results were similar to that of Puck, which showed an absorption feature matching water ice, so by extrapolating they concluded that this was likely the case for Portia as well. 2003 observations with the W.M. Keck II telescope failed to find any water ice absorption features. Later observations in 2019 with the Keck telescope suggested the absence of water ice on the surface, though they acknowledged that they could have missed a small water ice absorption feature. Observations with James Webb Space Telescope in 2023 found evidence for water ice or hydrated minerals on Portia's surface.

== Gallery ==
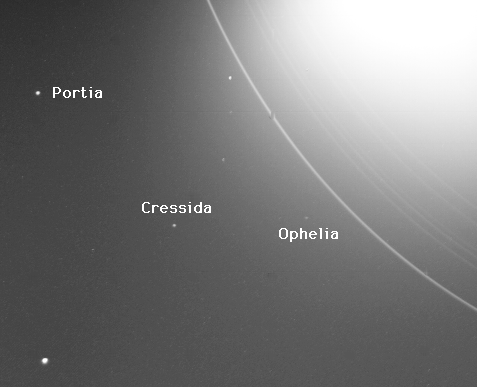
NASA image of three minor moons of Uranus: Portia, Cressida and Ophelia.

== See also ==
- Moons of Uranus
