= 666 Desdemona =

Main-belt asteroid

Discovery
- Discovered by: A. Kopff
- Discovery site: Heidelberg Obs.
- Discovery date: 23 July 1908

Designations
- Pronunciation: /dɛzdɪˈmoʊnə/
- Named after: Desdemona (character in Othello)
- Alternative designations: 1908 DM
- Minor planet category: main-belt · (middle)

Orbital characteristics
- Epoch 16 February 2017 (JD 2457800.5)
- Uncertainty parameter 0
- Observation arc: 107.90 yr (39,410 days)
- Aphelion: 3.2102 AU
- Perihelion: 1.9755 AU
- Semi-major axis: 2.5928 AU
- Eccentricity: 0.2381
- Orbital period (sidereal): 4.18 yr (1,525 days)
- Mean anomaly: 309.91°
- Mean motion: 0° 14^{m} 9.96^{s} / day
- Inclination: 7.5856°
- Longitude of ascending node: 215.41°
- Argument of perihelion: 174.16°

Physical characteristics
- Mean diameter: 28.4+0.9 −0.8 km (pole solution 1); 28.3+0.9 −1.0 km (pole solution 2)
- Synodic rotation period: 14.60795±0.00008 h (pole solution 1); 14.60796±0.00003 h (pole solution 2)
- Pole ecliptic longitude: 10° ± 4° or 174° ± 3°
- Pole ecliptic latitude: 39° ± 5° or 36° ± 11°
- Geometric albedo: 0.111+0.007 −0.009 (pole solution 1); 0.111+0.006 −0.014 (pole solution 2); 0.095±0.015; 0.1026±0.0207; 0.105±0.006; 0.1055±0.008 (IRAS:17); 0.1372 (derived)
- Spectral type: S
- Absolute magnitude (H): 10.6 · 10.90

666 Desdemona is a stony asteroid from the middle region of the asteroid belt, approximately 29 kilometers in diameter. It was discovered on 23 July 1908, by German astronomer August Kopff at Heidelberg Observatory in southern Germany, and named after Desdemona, character in Shakespeare's The Tragedy of Othello, the Moor of Venice. The name may have been inspired by the asteroid's provisional designation 1908 DM.

== Classification and orbit ==
Desdemona is a stony S-type asteroid that orbits the Sun in the middle main-belt at a distance of 2.0–3.2 AU once every 4 years and 2 months (1,525 days). Its orbit has an eccentricity of 0.24 and an inclination of 8° with respect to the ecliptic. As no precoveries were taken, the asteroid's observation arc begins with its official discovery observation at Heidelberg.

== Physical characteristics ==
=== Rotation period ===
In 2013, a rotational lightcurve for this asteroid was obtained from photometric observations made by astronomer Anna Marciniak at Poznań Observatory, Poland. It gave a rotation period of 14.607±0.004 hours with a brightness variation of 0.22 in magnitude (U=2+), superseding a period from in 2000, obtained at the Californian Santana Observatory (646), which gave a slightly longer period of 15.45±0.01 hours and an amplitude of 0.11 (U=2).

Between 2004 and 2006, three more lightcurves were constructed from photometric observations, but they were all fragmentary and based on results with less than full coverage (U=2-/1+/2-). (Note: Three different observations by Laurent Bernasconi, Jean Strajnic et al., and René Roy between 2004 and 2006 rendered a rotation period 9.6 hours with a brightness variation of 0.07, 0.16 and 0.09 in magnitude, respectively. All observations are labelled tentative and CALL assigned a Quality-Code between 1+ and -2. Summary figures at Collaborative Asteroid Lightcurve Link (CALL) and Asteroids and comets rotation curves – (666) Desdemona Geneva Observatory, Light-curves)

=== Diameter and albedo ===
According to the surveys carried out by the Infrared Astronomical Satellite IRAS, the Japanese Akari satellite, and NASA's Wide-field Infrared Survey Explorer (WISE) with its subsequent NEOWISE mission, the asteroid's surface has an albedo between 0.095 and 0.106. While the Collaborative Asteroid Lightcurve Link agrees with the space-based IRAS and Akari surveys on a diameter of approximately 27 kilometers, the results from WISE and NEOWISE found a larger diameter of 31.5 to 32.7 kilometers, respectively.

== Naming ==
This minor planet was named after Desdemona, the wife of Othello in the play The Tragedy of Othello, the Moor of Venice written by William Shakespeare in 1604 (also see 2985 Shakespeare). It is presumed that the naming of "Desdemona" could have been inspired by the two letters of its provisional designation (1908 DM). One of the satellites of Uranus (Uranus X), discovered by Voyager 2 in 1986, is also named Desdemona (H 68).
