= Erich Karkoschka =

American astronomer

Erich Karkoschka (born 1955) is a planetary researcher at the Lunar and Planetary Laboratory of the University of Arizona. He discovered a satellite of Uranus, S/1986 U 10 (later named Perdita) on photographs taken by the Voyager 2 spacecraft. He has assembled a number of movies including: the Huygens landing on the moon Titan, the seasonal patterns on Uranus, and a rare triple eclipse on Jupiter. The Jupiter and Uranus images were released as US postage stamps in 2016.

His book, The Observer's Sky Atlas, has been translated into several languages as a resource for those interested in observing the sky.

An asteroid, 30786 Karkoschka (1988 QC), is named in his honour.
