= Cressida (moon) =

Moon of Uranus

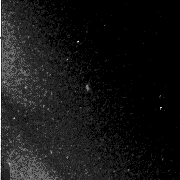
- Cressida imaged by Voyager 2 on January 24, 1986 at a resolution of 10 km/pixel

Discovery
- Discovered by: Stephen P. Synnott with Voyager 2
- Discovery date: January 9, 1986

Designations
- Designation: Uranus IX
- Pronunciation: /ˈkrɛsɪdə/
- Named after: Χρησίδα
- Adjectives: Cressidian /krɛˈsɪdiən/

Orbital characteristics
- Epoch 2008-09-01 00:00:00 UTC
- Semi-major axis: 61766.760 km
- Eccentricity: 0.00056
- Orbital period (sidereal): 0.464 d (calculated)
- Average orbital speed: 9.69 km/s (calculated)
- Inclination: 0.05023° (to Uranus' equator)
- Satellite of: Uranus

Physical characteristics
- Dimensions: 92 × 74 × 74 km (Note: The satellite's shape was modelled as a prolate spheroid (a × b × b); thus, only constraints for two axes were determined (a × b = 46 × 37 km).)
- Mean radius: 39.5±3.1 km (Note: This is the geometric mean of the three axes ($\sqrt[3]{a\cdot b\cdot b}$), calculated from $\sqrt{ab}$ = 41±2 km and $b/a$ = 0.8±0.3. However, various sources use 41±2 km or 46 × 37 km as the radius value or cross section size instead.)
- Volume: 263800 km^{3} ± 38.0%
- Mass: (1.839±0.212)×10^{17} kg; (2.5±0.4)×10^{17} kg
- Mean density: 0.70+0.44 −0.21 g/cm^{3}; 0.86±0.16 g/cm^{3}
- Synodic rotation period: synchronous (presumed)
- Axial tilt: zero (assumed)
- Albedo: 0.069±0.007 (geometric); 0.026 ± 0.005 (Bond)
- Apparent magnitude: 21.51–21.64 (± 0.11) (at opposition)
- Absolute magnitude (H): 8.80–8.93 (± 0.11)

Cressida /ˈkrɛsɪdə/ is an inner satellite of Uranus. It was discovered from the images taken by Voyager 2 on 9 January 1986, and was given the temporary designation S/1986 U 3. It was named after Cressida, the Trojan daughter of Calchas, a tragic heroine who appears in William Shakespeare's play Troilus and Cressida (as well as in tales by Geoffrey Chaucer and others). It is also designated Uranus IX.

Cressida belongs to the Portia group of satellites, which includes Bianca, Desdemona, Juliet, Portia, Rosalind, Cupid, Belinda, and Perdita. These satellites have similar orbits and photometric properties. Other than its orbit, size of 92 km × 74 km (57 mi × 46 mi), and geometric albedo of 0.069, little is known about it.

In Voyager 2 imagery Cressida appears as an elongated object, with its major axis pointing towards Uranus. The ratio of axes of Cressida's prolate spheroid is 0.8 ± 0.3. Its surface is grey in color.

Cressida orbits close to a 3:2 resonance with the η ring, one of the rings of Uranus. Perturbations of the ring's shape provide a way to measure the mass of Cressida, which in 2024 was found to be (1.839±0.212)×10^{17} kg. Cressida is one of the few small satellites of Uranus for which the mass has been directly measured.

Cressida may collide with Desdemona within the next 100 million years.

== See also ==
- Moons of Uranus
