= Jack J. Lissauer =

American research scientist (born 1957)

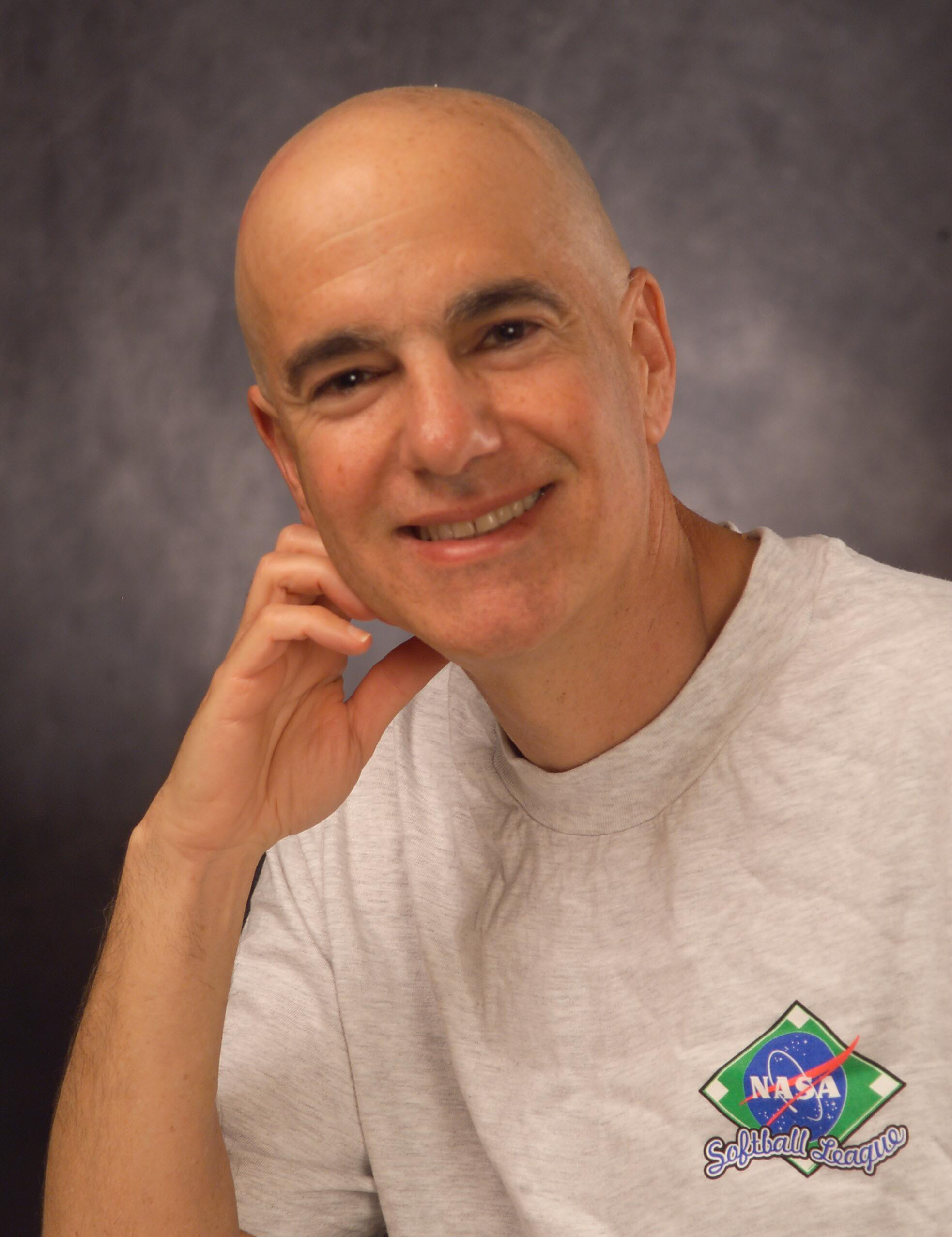
- Born: Jack Jonathan Lissauer; 1957 (age 68–69)
- Known for: American research scientist

Jack Jonathan Lissauer (born 1957) is an American research scientist who has worked for NASA's Ames Research Center since 1996. He is a science co-investigator on the Kepler space telescope mission.

== Biography ==
Lissauer received a PhD in mathematics from the University of California, Berkeley in 1982.

Prior to joining NASA, Lissauer was an associate professor (September 1993 – August 1996) and assistant professor (June 1987 – August 1993) at Stony Brook University. Earlier, he served as a visiting researcher at the University of California, Santa Barbara (July 1985 – June 1987) and as an assistant research astronomer at the University of California, Berkeley (January–July 1985).

His primary research interests are the formation of planetary systems, planetary dynamics and chaos, planetary ring systems, and circumstellar/protoplanetary disks.

He discovered, together with Mark R. Showalter, the inner satellites of Uranus: Cupid and Mab. With Showalter, I. de Pater and R. S. French, he also discovered Hippocamp, a small satellite of Neptune. In 2014, he was given the H. Julian Allen Award for his paper "Models of Jupiter's growth incorporating thermal and hydrodynamic constraints". His previous awards include the Harold C. Urey Prize from Division of Planetary Sciences of the American Astronomical Society (AAS), the Chambliss Astronomical Writing Award from the AAS and a NASA Honor Award for Exceptional Scientific Achievement.

He was elected a Legacy Fellow of the American Astronomical Society in 2020.
