= Juliet (moon) =

Moon of Uranus

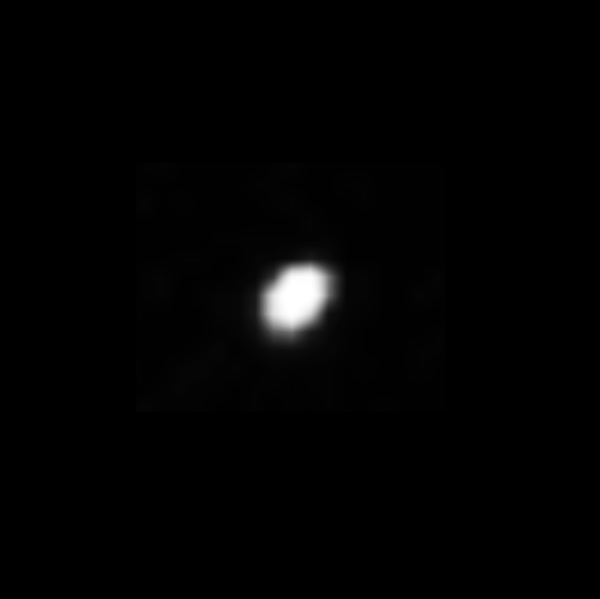

Discovery
- Discovered by: Stephen P. Synnott / Voyager 2
- Discovery date: January 3, 1986

Designations
- Designation: Uranus XI
- Pronunciation: /ˈdʒuːliɛt/
- Adjectives: Julietian

Orbital characteristics
- Epoch 2008-09-01 00:00:00 UTC
- Semi-major axis: 64358.268 km
- Eccentricity: 0.00122
- Orbital period (sidereal): 0.493 d (calculated)
- Average orbital speed: 9.49 km/s (calculated)
- Inclination: 0.03158° (to Uranus's equator)
- Satellite of: Uranus

Physical characteristics
- Dimensions: 150 × 74 × 74 km (Note: The satellite's shape was modelled as a prolate spheroid (a × b × b); thus, only constraints for two axes were determined (a × b = 75 × 37 km).)
- Mean radius: 47.2±3.9 km (Note: This is the geometric mean of the three axes ($\sqrt[3]{a\cdot b\cdot b}$), calculated from $\sqrt{ab}$ = 53±4 km and $b/a$ = 0.5±0.1. However, various sources use 53±4 km or 75 × 37 km as the radius value or cross section size instead.)
- Volume: 430100 km^{3} ± 23.0%
- Mass: (3.871±0.891)×10^{17} kg
- Mean density: 0.5–1.2 g/cm^{3} 0.9 g/cm^{3} (assumed)
- Synodic rotation period: synchronous (presumed)
- Axial tilt: zero (assumed)
- Albedo: 0.075 ± 0.011 (geometric); 0.026 ± 0.005 (Bond)
- Apparent magnitude: 20.96–21.27 (± 0.05) (at opposition)
- Absolute magnitude (H): 8.25–8.56 (± 0.05)

Juliet is an inner satellite of Uranus. It was discovered from the images taken by Voyager 2 on 3 January 1986, and was given the temporary designation S/1986 U 2. It is named after the heroine of William Shakespeare's play Romeo and Juliet. It is also designated Uranus XI.

Juliet belongs to the Portia group of satellites, which also includes Bianca, Cressida, Desdemona, Portia, Rosalind, Cupid, Belinda, and Perdita. These satellites have similar orbits and photometric properties. Other than its orbit, size of 150 km × 74 km (93 mi × 46 mi), and geometric albedo of 0.075, little is known about Juliet.

In Voyager 2 imagery, Juliet appears as an elongated object, with its major axis pointing towards Uranus. The ratio of axes of Juliet's prolate spheroid is 0.5 ± 0.1, which is a rather extreme value. Its surface is grey in color.

Juliet may collide with Desdemona within the next 100 million years.

== See also ==
- Moons of Uranus
