= Bianca (moon) =

Moon of Uranus

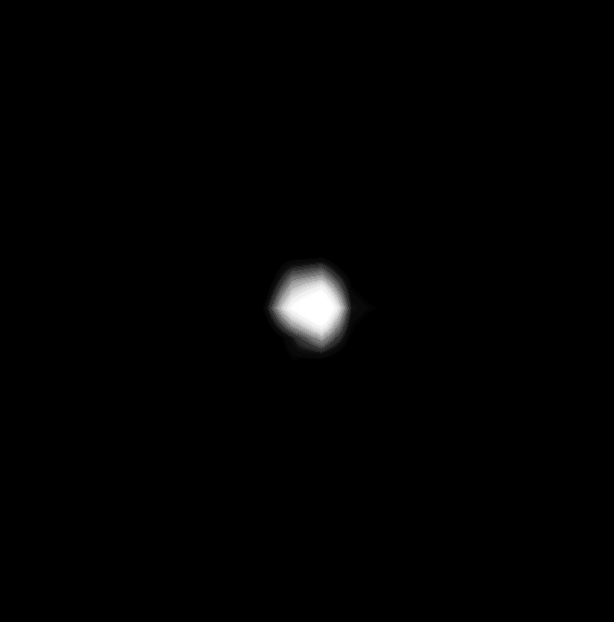

Discovery
- Discovered by: Bradford A. Smith / Voyager 2
- Discovery date: January 23, 1986

Designations
- Designation: Uranus VIII
- Pronunciation: /biˈæŋkə/
- Adjectives: Biancan

Orbital characteristics
- Epoch 2004 August 25 12:00 ET (JED 2453243.0)
- Semi-major axis: 59165.5621±0.0057 km
- Eccentricity: 0.000274±0.000172
- Orbital period (sidereal): 0.43457902±0.00000006 d
- Average orbital speed: 9.90 km/s
- Mean motion: 828.387887±0.000121 °/d
- Inclination: 0.1811°±0.0182° (to Uranus's equator)
- Satellite of: Uranus

Physical characteristics
- Dimensions: 64 × 46 × 46 km (Note: The satellite's shape was modelled as a prolate spheroid (a × b × b); thus, only constraints for two axes were determined (a × b = 32 × 23 km).)
- Mean radius: 25.4±2.2 km (Note: This is the geometric mean of the three axes ($\sqrt[3]{a\cdot b\cdot b}$), calculated from $\sqrt{ab}$ = 27±2 km and $b/a$ = 0.7±0.2. However, various sources use 27±2 km or 32 × 23 km as the radius value or cross section size instead.)
- Volume: 70900 km^{3} ± 29.9%
- Mass: (6.38±1.91)×10^{16} kg
- Mean density: 0.5–1.2 g/cm^{3} 0.9 g/cm^{3} (assumed)
- Synodic rotation period: synchronous (assumed)
- Axial tilt: zero (assumed)
- Albedo: 0.065 ± 0.010 (geometric); 0.026 ± 0.005 (Bond)
- Apparent magnitude: 22.42–22.61 (± 0.24) (at opposition)
- Absolute magnitude (H): 9.71–9.90 (± 0.24)

There is also an asteroid called 218 Bianca.

Bianca is an inner satellite of Uranus. It was discovered from the images taken by Voyager 2 on January 23, 1986, and was given the temporary designation S/1986 U 9. It was named after the sister of Katherina in Shakespeare's play The Taming of the Shrew. It is also designated Uranus VIII.

Bianca belongs to the Portia group of satellites, which also includes Cressida, Desdemona, Juliet, Portia, Rosalind, Cupid, Belinda, and Perdita. These satellites have similar orbits and photometric properties. Other than its orbit, size of 64 km × 46 km (40 mi × 29 mi), and geometric albedo of 0.065, little is known about it.

In Voyager 2 images Bianca appears as an elongated object, with its major axis pointing towards Uranus. The ratio of axes of Bianca's prolate spheroid is 0.7±0.2. Its surface is grey in color.

== See also ==
- Moons of Uranus
