= Rosalind (moon) =

Moon of Uranus

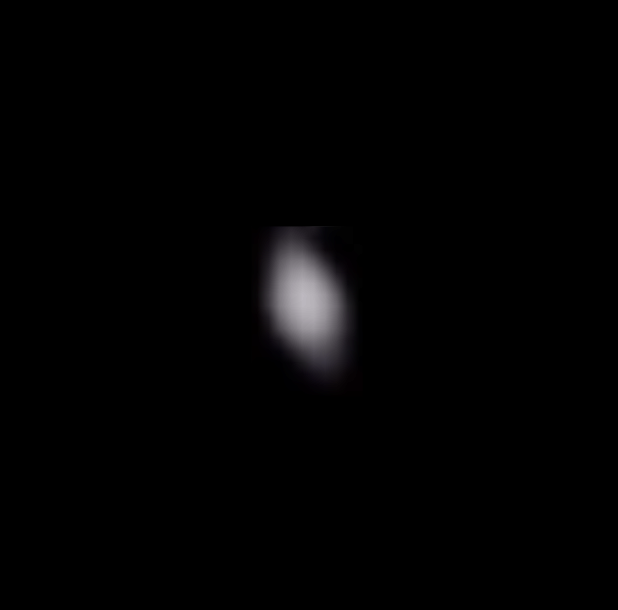
- The Hubble Space Telescope captured tiny Rosalind orbiting Uranus in 1997

Discovery
- Discovered by: Stephen P. Synnott / Voyager 2
- Discovery date: January 13, 1986

Designations
- Designation: Uranus XIII
- Pronunciation: /ˈrɒzələnd/
- Adjectives: Rosalindian /rɒzəˈlɪndiən/

Orbital characteristics
- Epoch 2008-09-01 00:00:00 UTC
- Semi-major axis: 69926.849 km
- Eccentricity: 0.00090
- Orbital period (sidereal): 0.559 d (calculated)
- Average orbital speed: 9.10 km/s (calculated)
- Inclination: 0.04922° (to Uranus's equator)
- Satellite of: Uranus

Physical characteristics
- Dimensions: 72 × 72 × 72 km (Note: The satellite's shape was modelled as a prolate spheroid (a × b × b); thus, only constraints for two axes were determined (a × b = 36 × 36 km).)
- Mean radius: 36 ± 6 km (Note: This is actually the geometric mean of the two axes, $\sqrt{ab}$ = 36±6 km.)
- Volume: 195 400 km^{3} ± 31.4%
- Mass: (1.759±0.552)×10^{17} kg
- Mean density: 0.5–1.2 g/cm^{3} 0.9 g/cm^{3} (assumed)
- Synodic rotation period: synchronous (presumed)
- Axial tilt: zero (assumed)
- Albedo: 0.072 ± 0.024 (geometric); 0.026 ± 0.005 (Bond)
- Apparent magnitude: 21.79 ± 0.13 (at opposition)
- Absolute magnitude (H): 9.08 ± 0.13

There is also an asteroid called 900 Rosalinde.

Rosalind is an inner satellite of Uranus. It was discovered from the images taken by Voyager 2 on 13 January 1986, and was given the temporary designation S/1986 U 4. It was named after the daughter of the banished Duke in William Shakespeare's play As You Like It. It is also designated Uranus XIII.

Rosalind belongs to Portia group of satellites, which also includes Bianca, Cressida, Desdemona, Portia, Juliet, Cupid, Belinda, and Perdita. These satellites have similar orbits and photometric properties. Other than its orbit, diameter of 72 km (45 mi), and geometric albedo of 0.072, little is known about Rosalind.

In Voyager 2 imagery, Rosalind appears as an almost spherical object, though the Hubble Space Telescope observed its light curve to vary over time, evidence of a prolate shape. The ratio of axes of Rosalind's prolate spheroid is 0.8–1.0. It has a slightly redder continuum slope than its neighbouring moons, possibly due to being coated with dust from the ν ring. The redness may indicate that its surface is partially composed of organic material.

Rosalind is very close to a 3:5 orbital resonance with Cordelia.

== See also ==
- Moons of Uranus
