= Belinda (moon) =

Moon of Uranus

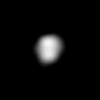
- Belinda viewed by Voyager 2 in 1986

Discovery
- Discovered by: Stephen P. Synnott / Voyager 2
- Discovery date: January 13, 1986

Designations
- Designation: Uranus XIV
- Pronunciation: /bəˈlɪndə/
- Adjectives: Belindian

Orbital characteristics
- Epoch 2008-09-01 00:00:00 UTC
- Semi-major axis: 75255.674 km
- Eccentricity: 0.00079
- Orbital period (sidereal): 0.624 d (calculated)
- Average orbital speed: 8.77 km/s (calculated)
- Inclination: 0.00172° (to Uranus's equator)
- Satellite of: Uranus

Physical characteristics
- Dimensions: 128 × 64 × 64 km (Note: The satellite's shape was modelled as a prolate spheroid (a × b × b); thus, only constraints for two axes were determined (a × b = 64 × 32 km).)
- Mean radius: 40.1±7.3 km (Note: This is the geometric mean of the three axes ($\sqrt[3]{a\cdot b\cdot b}$), calculated from $\sqrt{ab}$ = 45±8 km and $b/a$ = 0.5±0.1. However, various sources use 45±8 km or 64 × 32 km as the radius value or cross section size instead.)
- Volume: 274500 km^{3} ± 32.7%
- Mass: (2.471±0.807)×10^{17} kg
- Mean density: 0.5–1.2 g/cm^{3} 0.9 g/cm^{3} (assumed)
- Synodic rotation period: synchronous (presumed)
- Axial tilt: zero (assumed)
- Albedo: 0.067 ± 0.024 (geometric); 0.026 ± 0.005 (Bond)
- Apparent magnitude: 21.31–21.63 (± 0.09) (at opposition)
- Absolute magnitude (H): 8.60–8.92 (± 0.09)

Belinda is an inner satellite of the planet Uranus. Belinda was discovered from the images taken by Voyager 2 on 13 January 1986 and was given the temporary designation S/1986 U 5. It is named after the heroine of Alexander Pope's The Rape of the Lock. It is also designated Uranus XIV.

Belinda belongs to the Portia group of satellites, which also includes Bianca, Cressida, Desdemona, Portia, Juliet, Cupid, Rosalind and Perdita. These satellites have similar orbits and photometric properties. Belinda orbits particularly closely to Cupid and Perdita. Other than its orbit, size of 128 km × 64 km (80 mi × 40 mi), and geometric albedo of 0.067, little is known about it.

Voyager 2 images show Belinda as an elongated object with its major axis pointing towards Uranus. The moon is very elongated, with its short axis 0.5 ± 0.1 times the long axis. Its surface is grey in color.

Belinda is in a stable 44:43 mean-motion resonance with Perdita, and from this its mass has been determined to be roughly 26 or 27 times that of Perdita.

The Portia group is unstable over timescales of several millions of years. A 2012 study found that Belinda and Cupid will probably be the first pair of moons to collide, in 100,000 to 10 million years' time depending on the densities of the Portia-group satellites, due to resonant interactions with the much smaller Cupid. However, a later analysis in 2022 indicated that Cupid's orbit is protected by the 44:43 orbital resonance between Belinda and Perdita, so it is likely to survive for at least 50 million years. Contradicting this, another study in 2022 found that Belinda and Perdita were not in the resonance, and that Cupid is not likely to survive the next 50,000 years. Another study in 2026 found that Belinda and Perdita were indeed in resonance.

== See also ==
- Moons of Uranus
