= Perdita (moon) =

Moon of Uranus

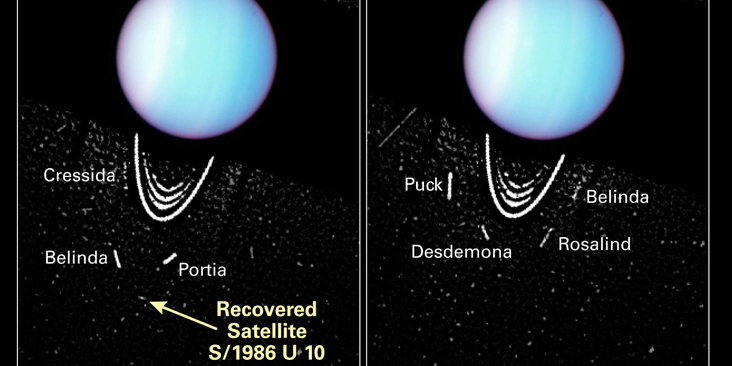

Discovery
- Discovered by: Erich Karkoschka / Voyager 2
- Discovery date: May 18, 1999 (in images dating back to January 18, 1986)

Designations
- Designation: Uranus XXV
- Pronunciation: /ˈpɜːrdətə/
- Adjectives: Perditean /pɜːrdəˈtiːən/

Orbital characteristics
- Epoch 2008-09-01 00:00:00 UTC
- Mean orbit radius: 76416.764 km
- Eccentricity: 0.00345
- Orbital period (sidereal): 0.638 d (calculated)
- Average orbital speed: 8.71 km/s (calculated)
- Inclination: 0.05889° (to Uranus's equator)
- Satellite of: Uranus

Physical characteristics
- Mean radius: 13.3±0.7 km
- Surface area: ~2200 km^{2} (Note: Calculated on the basis of other parameters.)
- Volume: ~9900 km^{3}
- Mass: ~(4.9–12)×10^{15} kg
- Mean density: 0.5–1.2 g/cm^{3}
- Surface gravity: ~0.002–0.004 m/s^{2}
- Escape velocity: ~0.007–0.011 km/s
- Synodic rotation period: synchronous (presumed)
- Axial tilt: zero (assumed)
- Albedo: 0.070 ± 0.006 (geometric; assumed)
- Apparent magnitude: 23.70 ± 0.50
- Absolute magnitude (H): 10.99 ± 0.50

Perdita /ˈpɜːrdətə/ is a small inner satellite of Uranus. Perdita's discovery was very complicated, as the first photographs of Perdita were taken by the Voyager 2 spacecraft in 1986, but it was not recognized from the photographs for more than a decade. In 1999, the moon was noticed by Erich Karkoschka and reported. However, because no further pictures could be taken to confirm its existence, it was officially demoted in 2001. However, in 2003, pictures taken by the Hubble Space Telescope managed to pick up an object where Perdita was supposed to be, finally confirming its existence.

Following its discovery in 1999, it was given the temporary designation of S/1986 U 10. It was named Perdita (Latin for 'lost') after the daughter of Leontes and Hermione in William Shakespeare's play The Winter's Tale. The moon is also designated Uranus XXV.

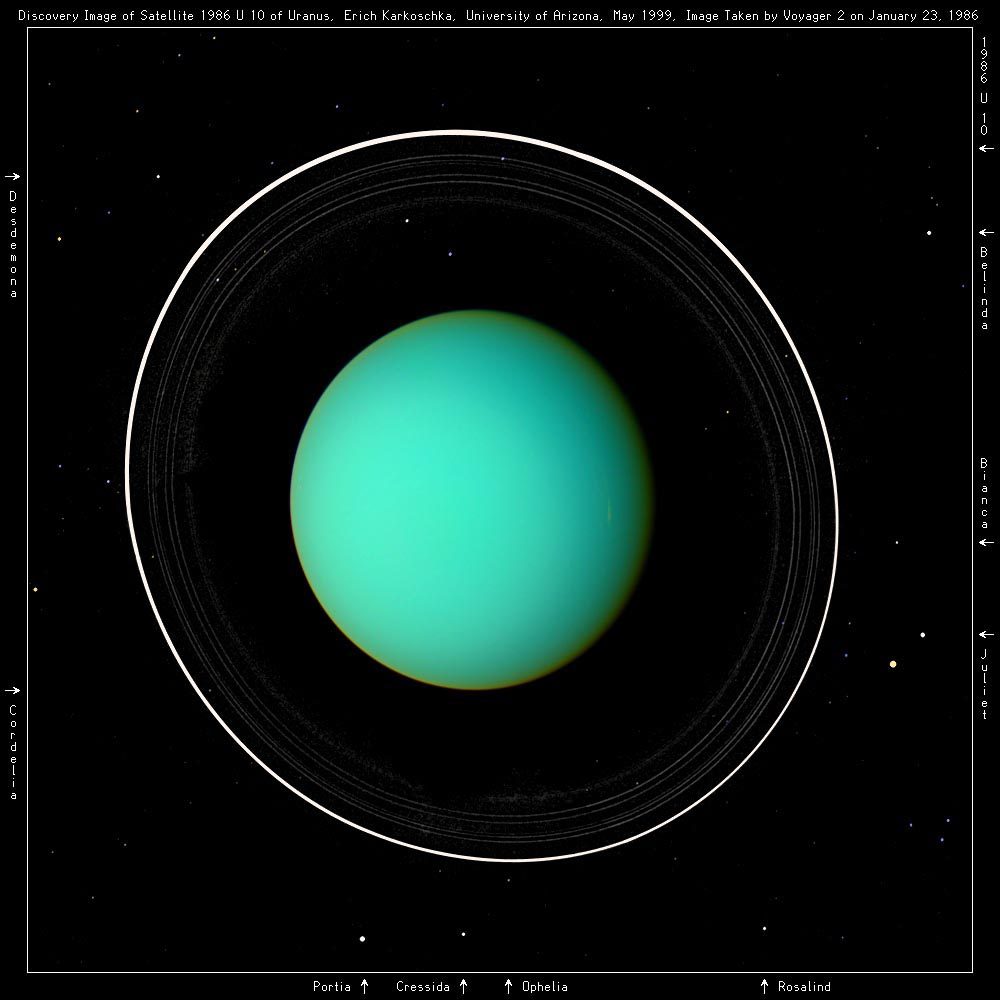
Discovery image of Perdita taken by Voyager 2 on 23 January 1986. The location of the moon is indicated by the arrow on the upper right.

The moon orbits between Belinda and Puck. The Hubble measurements of its discovery show that Perdita does not follow a direct Keplerian motion around Uranus. Instead, it is caught in a 43:44 orbital resonance with the nearby moon Belinda, and from this resonance it has been determined that Belinda's mass is roughly 26 or 27 times that of Perdita. It is also close to an 8:7 resonance with Rosalind.

A study in 2022 found that Perdita and Belinda were not actually in resonance. Contradicting this, two other studies found that the resonance does exist and is stable.

Perdita belongs to the Portia group of satellites, which also includes Bianca, Cressida, Desdemona, Portia, Juliet, Cupid, Rosalind, and Belinda. These satellites have similar orbits and photometric properties. Little is known about Perdita apart from its orbit and intrinsic brightness. By assuming its geometric albedo is similar to that of the other Portia group members, its radius can be estimated at 13.3 km (8.3 mi).

== See also ==
- Moons of Uranus
- Natural satellite
