= Desdemona (moon) =

Moon of Uranus

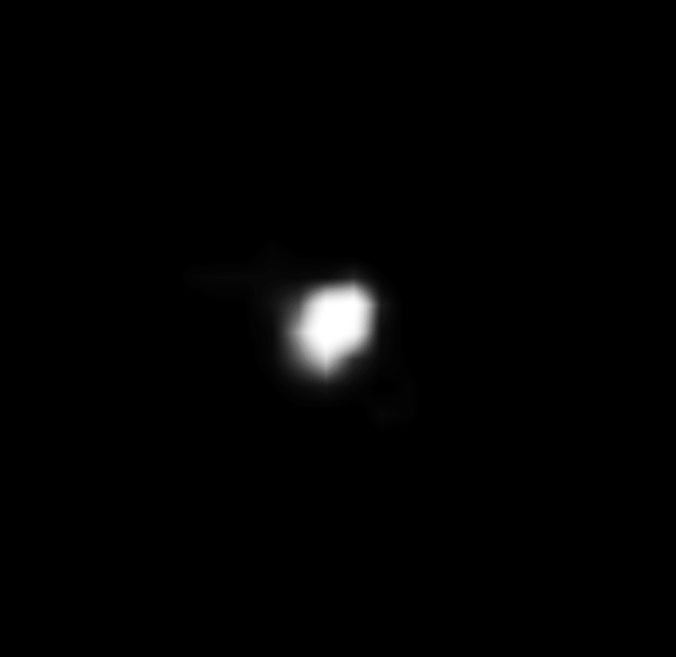
- Discovery image of Desdemona

Discovery
- Discovered by: Stephen P. Synnott / Voyager 2
- Discovery date: January 13, 1986

Designations
- Designation: Uranus X
- Pronunciation: /dɛzdəˈmoʊnə/
- Adjectives: Desdemonan, Desdemonian, Desdemonean /dɛzdəˈmoʊn(i)ən/

Orbital characteristics
- Epoch 2008-09-01 00:00:00 UTC
- Semi-major axis: 62658.422 km
- Eccentricity: 0.00073
- Orbital period (sidereal): 0.474 d (calculated)
- Average orbital speed: 9.62 km/s (calculated)
- Inclination: 0.04673° (to Uranus's equator)
- Satellite of: Uranus

Physical characteristics
- Dimensions: 90 × 54 × 54 km (Note: The satellite's shape was modelled as a prolate spheroid (a × b × b); thus, only constraints for two axes were determined (a × b = 45 × 27 km).)
- Mean radius: 32.1±4.1 km (Note: This is the geometric mean of the three axes ($\sqrt[3]{a\cdot b\cdot b}$), calculated from $\sqrt{ab}$ = 35±4 km and $b/a$ = 0.6±0.2. However, various sources use 35±4 km or 45 × 27 km as the radius value or cross section size instead.)
- Volume: 137400 km^{3} ± 37.5%
- Mass: (1.237±0.463)×10^{17} kg
- Mean density: 0.5–1.2 g/cm^{3} 0.90 g/cm^{3} (assumed)
- Synodic rotation period: synchronous (presumed)
- Axial tilt: zero (assumed)
- Albedo: 0.084 ± 0.019 (geometric); 0.026 ± 0.005 (Bond)
- Apparent magnitude: 21.86–22.11 (± 0.16) (at opposition)
- Absolute magnitude (H): 9.15–9.40 (± 0.16)

Desdemona is an inner satellite of Uranus. It was discovered from the images taken by Voyager 2 on 13 January 1986, and was given the temporary designation S/1986 U 6. Desdemona is named after the wife of Othello in William Shakespeare's play Othello. It is also designated Uranus X.

Desdemona belongs to the Portia group of satellites, which also includes Bianca, Cressida, Juliet, Portia, Rosalind, Cupid, Belinda, and Perdita. These satellites have similar orbits and photometric properties. Other than its orbit, size of 90 km × 54 km (56 mi × 34 mi), and geometric albedo of 0.084, little is known about Desdemona.

In Voyager 2 imagery, Desdemona appears as an elongated object, with its major axis pointing towards Uranus. The ratio of axes of Desdemona's prolate spheroid is 0.6 ± 0.2. Its surface is grey in color.

Desdemona may collide with one of its neighboring moons Cressida or Juliet within the next 100 million years.

== See also ==
- Moons of Uranus
