= Bond albedo =

Fraction of incident light reflected by an astronomical body

The Bond albedo (also called spheric albedo, planetary albedo, and bolometric albedo), named after the American astronomer George Phillips Bond (1825–1865), who originally proposed it, is the fraction of power in the total electromagnetic radiation incident on an astronomical body that is scattered back out into space.

Because the Bond albedo accounts for all of the light scattered from a body at all wavelengths and all phase angles, it is a necessary quantity for determining how much energy a body absorbs. This, in turn, is crucial for determining the equilibrium temperature of a body.

Because bodies in the outer Solar System are always observed at very low phase angles from the Earth, the only reliable data for measuring their Bond albedo comes from spacecraft.

== Phase integral ==
The Bond albedo (A) is related to the geometric albedo (p) by the expression

$$A = pq$$

where q is termed the phase integral and is given in terms of the directional scattered flux I(α) into phase angle α (averaged over all wavelengths and azimuthal angles) as

$$q = 2\int_0^\pi \frac{I(\alpha)}{I(0)} \sin\alpha \, d\alpha.$$

The phase angle α is the angle between the source of the radiation (usually the Sun) and the observing direction, and varies from zero for light scattered back towards the source, to 180° for observations looking towards the source. For example, during opposition or looking at the full moon, α is very small, while backlit objects or the new moon have α close to 180°.

== Examples ==
The Bond albedo is a value strictly between 0 and 1, as it includes all possible scattered light (but not radiation from the body itself). This is in contrast to other definitions of albedo such as the geometric albedo, which can be above 1. In general, though, the Bond albedo may be greater or smaller than the geometric albedo, depending on the surface and atmospheric properties of the body in question.

Some examples:

Name	Bond albedo	Visual geometric albedo
Mercury	0.088	0.142
Venus	0.76	0.689
Earth	0.306	0.434
Moon	0.11	0.12
Mars	0.25	0.17
Jupiter	0.503	0.538
Saturn	0.342	0.499
Enceladus	0.81	1.375
Uranus	0.300	0.488
Neptune	0.290	0.442
Pluto	0.41	0.51
Charon	0.29	0.41
Haumea	0.33	0.66
Makemake	0.74	0.82
Eris	0.99	0.96

== See also ==
- Albedo
- Geometric albedo
