= Cupid (moon) =

Moon of Uranus

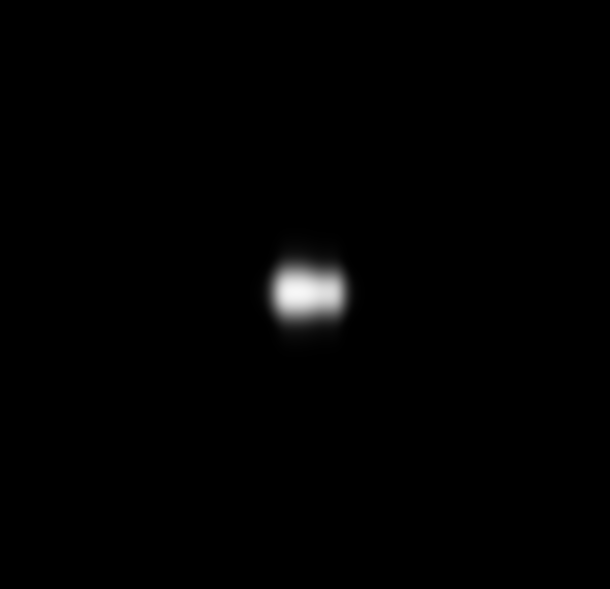

Discovery
- Discovered by: Mark R. Showalter and Jack J. Lissauer
- Discovery date: August 25, 2003

Designations
- Designation: Uranus XXVII
- Pronunciation: /ˈkjuːpəd/
- Adjectives: Cupidinian/kjuːpɪˈdɪniən/

Orbital characteristics
- Epoch 2008-09-01 00:00:00 UTC
- Semi-major axis: 74392.338 km
- Eccentricity: 0.00047
- Orbital period (sidereal): 0.613 d (calculated)
- Average orbital speed: 8.83 km/s (calculated)
- Inclination: 0.07028° (to Uranus's equator)
- Satellite of: Uranus

Physical characteristics
- Mean radius: 8.9±0.7 km
- Surface area: ~1,000 km^{2}
- Volume: ~3,000 km^{3}
- Mass: ~(1.5–3.5)×10^{15} kg
- Mean density: 0.5–1.2 g/cm^{3}
- Surface gravity: ~0.0013–0.0029 m/s^{2}
- Escape velocity: ~0.0047–0.0072 km/s
- Synodic rotation period: synchronous (presumed)
- Axial tilt: 0 (assumed)
- Albedo: 0.070±0.006 (geometric; assumed)

Cupid is an inner satellite of Uranus. It was discovered by Mark R. Showalter and Jack J. Lissauer in 2003 using the Hubble Space Telescope. Following its discovery, Cupid was given the temporary designation S/2003 U 2. It is also designated Uranus XXVII. It was named after a character in William Shakespeare's play Timon of Athens.

Cupid orbits within a group of moons called the Portia group, satellites that orbit very close together and have similar physical properties. It orbits particularly close to Belinda and Perdita; the orbit of Cupid is separated by only 863 km (536 mi) from the orbit of the larger moon Belinda.

Cupid is thought to have one of the least stable orbits of Uranus's inner moons. A 2012 study deemed it likely to collide with Belinda in the next 100,000–10 million years, due to resonance interactions that cause the smaller Cupid to drift into a more dangerous orbit over this timescale. However, a later analysis in 2022 indicated that Cupid's orbit is protected by a 44:43 orbital resonance between Belinda and Perdita, so it is likely to survive for at least 50 million years. Contradicting this, another study in 2022 found that Belinda and Perdita were not in the resonance, and that Cupid is not likely to survive the next 50,000 years.

Cupid is one of the smaller known inner Uranian satellites, crudely estimated to be only about 17.8 km (11.1 mi) in diameter, assuming its geometric albedo is the same as the other Portia group moons. Its faintness made it too dim to be detected by the Voyager 2 cameras during its Uranus flyby in 1986. Cupid's trailing side is 2.3 times brighter than its leading side.

Cupid is at most 500 million years old.
