= List of antennas in NASA's Deep Space Network =

The NASA Deep Space Network is located on three continents—Goldstone Deep Space Communications Complex (GDSCC), Canberra Deep Space Communications Complex (CDSCC), and Madrid Deep Space Communications Complex (MDSCC)—and has multiple antennas to provide continuous support for both robotic space probes and crewed missions.

== Naming and types ==
All deep space stations (DSSs) at the GDSCC site are designated with numbers in the teens and twenties: (i.e. DSS-13 and DSS-24); at the CDSCC with numbers in the thirties and forties (i.e. DSS-34 and DSS-43), and at the MDSCC with numbers in the fifties and sixties (i.e. DSS-54 and DSS-65).

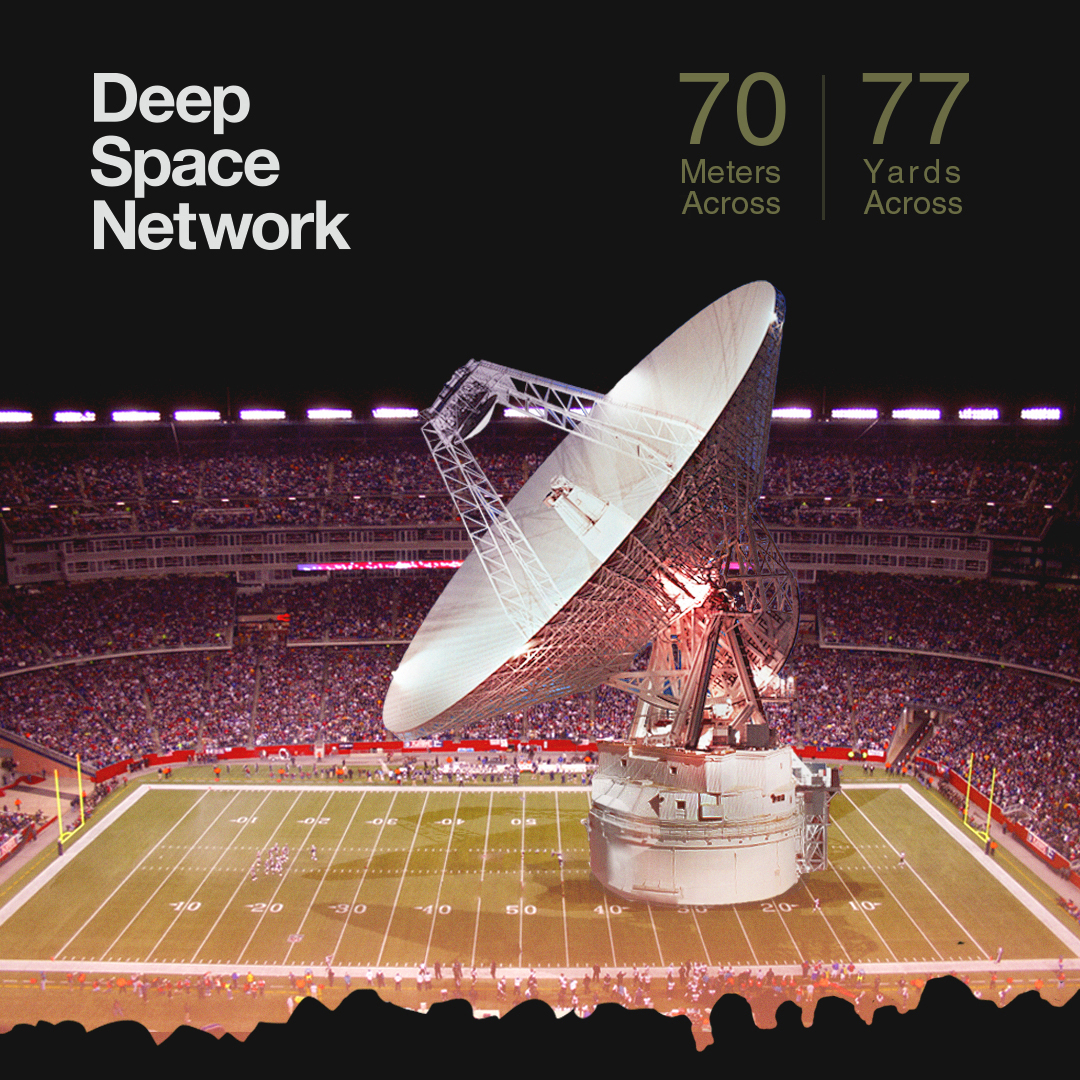
70m antenna

Antennas can be divided into several subnetworks by type:

1. The three 70 m DSSs (DSS-14, DSS-43, DSS-63) were originally built as 64 m diameter Cassegrain antennas, designed like Parkes Observatory's antenna. The first, DSS-14 began operation in 1966. All three were expanded to 70 m diameter from 1982 to 1988 to increase their sensitivity to support Voyager 2's encounter with Neptune. The 70 m DSSs are used for deep-space mission support, radio astronomy, and very-long-baseline interferometry. The DSS-14 is also used for radar astronomy as Goldstone Solar System Radar. Canberra's 70 m dish, DSS-43, is the only antenna that can communicate with Voyager 2 because of its south-celestial-hemisphere trajectory. The 70 m antennas support both X-band and S-band uplink and downlink.
2. The 34 m HEF Subnet (high-efficiency) (DSS-15, DSS-45, DSS-65) was installed to replace the older 34 m Standard, STD, subnet. The 34 m STD subnet DSSs had a polar-axis, or HA-DEC, design and were originally built with 26 m diameter reflectors and later upgraded to 34 m. The 34 m HEF subnet DSSs support X-band uplink and downlink, and S-band downlink. As of 2017, the 34 m antennas are being decommissioned.
3. The 34 m BWG Subnet (beam waveguide antenna) (DSS-24, DSS-25, DSS-26, DSS-34, DSS-54) can be recognized by the hole in the middle of their main reflectors where on other DSSs there is a feed cone that houses microwave equipment. BWG antennas have five precision radio frequency mirrors that reflect radio signals along a tube from the antenna to a below-ground room. The 34 m BWG subnet DSSs generally support both X-band and S-band uplink and downlink, though some antennas at GDSCC also have Ka-band uplink and downlink capability.
4. The 26 m Subnet (DSS-16, DSS-46, DSS-66) was used for rapidly tracking Earth-orbiting spacecraft. They were originally built to support the Apollo lunar missions between 1967 and 1972. The 26 m subnet DSSs support S-band uplink and downlink. All 26 m antennas were decommissioned in 2009.

== Antenna arraying ==
View from the Earth's north pole, showing the field of view of the main DSN antenna locations. Once a mission gets more than 30,000 km (19,000 mi) from Earth, it is always in view of at least one of the stations.

The antennas can combine signals and be used simultaneously to improve reception of weak signal. Arraying four 34 m antennas can provide the equivalent of one 70 m dish. As many as eight antennas can be arrayed at once.

NASA first used antenna arraying in the 1970s, experimenting with it for Voyager encounters at Jupiter and the Pioneer 11 encounter with Saturn. After early experiments, all three DSN complexes intensively used arraying for the Voyager encounters with Saturn in 1980 and 1981. By the time Voyager 2 flew by Uranus in 1986, the DSN was combining signals from up to four antennas. For the spacecraft’s Neptune encounter three years later, the DSN combined signals from Australia’s Parkes Radio Telescope into the Canberra complex, and combined signals from the 27 antennas of the Very Large Array in New Mexico into the Goldstone array.

NASA used arraying for the Galileo mission to Jupiter in 1996 and 1997. Galileo had a problem with its high-gain antenna, and the DSN arrayed up to five antennas from three tracking facilities (Goldstone, Canberra and Parkes) to increase the data return rate, resulting in increase by a factor of three, compared to that of a single 70-meter antenna.

== Canberra Deep Space Communications Complex (CDSCC) ==
| Photo | Name | Diameter | Date operational | Date decommissioned | Notes | Bands |
|---|---|---|---|---|---|---|
| | DSS-33 (1996) | 11m | 1996 | 2008 | Small Azimuth-Elevation-Train antenna, moved to Norway in 2008 for atmospheric research | X, S |
| | DSS-33 (2029) | 34m | 2029 | | Under construction from 2025, commissioning 2029. Beam waveguide antenna, receiving/transmitting hardware underground. | X, S |
| | DSS-34 | 34m | 1997 | | Beam waveguide antenna, receiving/transmitting hardware underground | Transmit: X (7145-7235 MHz), S (2025-2120 MHz); Receive: X (8200-8600MHz), S (2200-2300 MHz), K (25.5-27.0 GHz), Ka (31.8-32.3 GHz), X-Band Acquisition Aid (8400-8500MHz) |
| | DSS-35 | 34m | 2014 | | Operational late 2014, officially opened March 2015. Beam waveguide antenna, receiving/transmitting hardware underground. The design uses 'night sky cooling' to cool the transmitter. | Transmit: X (7145-7235 MHz); Receive: X (8200-8600MHz), Ka (31.8-32.3 GHz) |
| | DSS-36 | 34m | 2016 | | Beam waveguide antenna, receiving/transmitting hardware underground. Dish installed August 2015, operational late 2016, officially opened November 3, 2016. | Transmit: X (7145-7235 MHz), S (2025-2120 MHz); Receive: X (8200-8600MHz), S (2200-2300 MHz), Ka (31.8-32.3 GHz) |
| | DSS-42 | 34m | 1964 | 2000 | "Hour angle/declination" antenna, original 26m antenna, later expanded to 34m, dismantled shortly after decommissioning. | |
| | DSS-43 | 70m | 1973 | | Originally 64m, enlarged 1987. Largest steerable parabolic antenna in Southern Hemisphere. Only antenna capable of communicating with Voyager 2. Weighs 3000+ tonnes, 1,272 aluminum panels. In its spare time the dish is used for radio astronomy. | Transmit: X (7145-7190 MHz), S (2090-2120 MHz; Receive: X (8183-8633 MHz), S (2270-2300 MHz), L (1610-1705 MHz), K (18.0-26.5 GHz) |
| | DSS-45 | 34m | 1986 | 2016 | Was constructed for Voyager 2 Uranus flyby. Decommissioned after DSS-36 became operational | Transmit: X(7145-7190MHz); Receive: X (8200-8600MHz), S (2200-2300MHz) |
| | DSS-44/DSS-46 | 26m | 1966 | 2009 | X-Y axes antenna. Originally HSK at Honeysuckle Creek for Apollo program. Transferred to DSN as DSS-44 in 1974, moved to CDSCC as DSS-46 in 1983. AIAA Historical Aerospace Site | Transmit: S (2025-2120MHz); Receive: S (2200-2300MHz), S-Band Acquisition Aid (2200-2300MHz), X-Band Acquisition Aid (8400-8500MHz) |
| | DSS-49 | 64m | 1961 | | Parkes Observatory radio telescope, is sometimes used to assist with DSN operations as a receiver, with no transmission capability. | |

== Goldstone Deep Space Communications Complex (GDSCC) ==
| Photo | Name | Diameter | Date operational | Date decommissioned | Notes | Bands |
|---|---|---|---|---|---|---|
| | DSS-11 "Pioneer" | 26m | 1958 | 1978 | First antenna in Goldstone. | |
| | DSS-12 "Echo" | 34m | 1959 | 2012 | Polar-mounted antenna. From 1996 was removed from DSN operations and used for education. | S, X |
| | DSS-13 "Venus" | 34m | 1962 | | In 1962 was opened as 26m antenna, upgraded to 34m beam waveguide in 1991. In 2024, it was retrofitted with an optical terminal to track the downlink laser of the Deep Space Optical Communications (DSOC) experiment that is aboard NASA's Psyche mission. | |
| | DSS-14 "Mars" | 70m | 1966 | | Originally a 64m antenna, upgraded to 70m in 1988 to support Voyager. Cassegrain reflector on altazimuth mount. ~3850 m² aperture | |
| | DSS-15 "Uranus" | 34m | 1984 | 2018 | "High Efficiency" reflector on altazimuth mount | |
| | DSS-16 "Apollo" | 26m | 1967 | - | X-Y axis antenna, built in 1967 for the Apollo missions. It was a part of the Manned Space Flight Network. The dish is "currently in an extended downtime configuration." | |
| | DSS-23 | 34m | 2026 | | Beam waveguide reflector, entered service in August 2026 | |
| | DSS-24, DSS-25, DSS-26 "Apollo" | 34m | 1996 | | Cluster of three beam waveguide reflectors on altazimuth mounts | |
| | DSS-27 and DSS-28 "Gemini" | 34m | 1994 | 2010 | Originally built by JPL for the army, in 1994 transferred to NASA. BWA "High Speed" Alt/Az mount. DSS-27 is decommissioned. DSS-28 was upgraded in 2010 with bandwidth radiometer and digital signal processor and is used for radio science under Goldstone Apple Valley Radio Telescope program. It is not used for the DSN operations. | |

== Madrid Deep Space Communications Complex (MDSCC) ==
| Photo | Name | Diameter | Date operational | Date decommissioned | Notes | Bands |
|---|---|---|---|---|---|---|
| | DSS-53 | 34m | 2022 | | Beam waveguide antenna, entered operations February 2022 | Transmit: X Receive: X, Ka |
| | DSS-54 | 34m | 1997 | | Azimut-Elevación type beam waveguide antenna | Transmit: X, S Receive: S, X, Q, Ka and Ka II |
| | DSS-55 | 34m | 2003 | | Azimut-Elevation type beam waveguide antenna | Transmit: X Receive: X, Ka |
| | DSS-56 | 34m | 2021 | | Beam waveguide antenna, entered service January 2021 | Transmit: X, S Receive: S, X, Ka and Ka II |
| | DSS-61 | 34m | | 1999 | Deactivated late 1999, transferred to NASA for PARTNeR Project February 2001 | |
| | DSS-63 | 70m | 1974 | | Built as 64m antenna, upgraded to 70m in late 1980s. Weighs 8000 tons (dish: 3500 tons). Reflecting surface: 4180 m² | Transmit: S, X, Receive: L, S, X |
| | DSS-65 | 34m | 1987 | | High-efficiency (HEF) antenna. Weighs 400 tons (dish: 350 tons). | Transmit: S, X Receive: S, X |
| | DSS-66 | 26m | | 2009 | Moved from Fresnedillas tracking station in 1983. Used for near-Earth missions and early orbit phase of deep-space missions | |

== See also ==
- Deep space bands
