= Voyager 2 =

NASA space probe launched in 1977

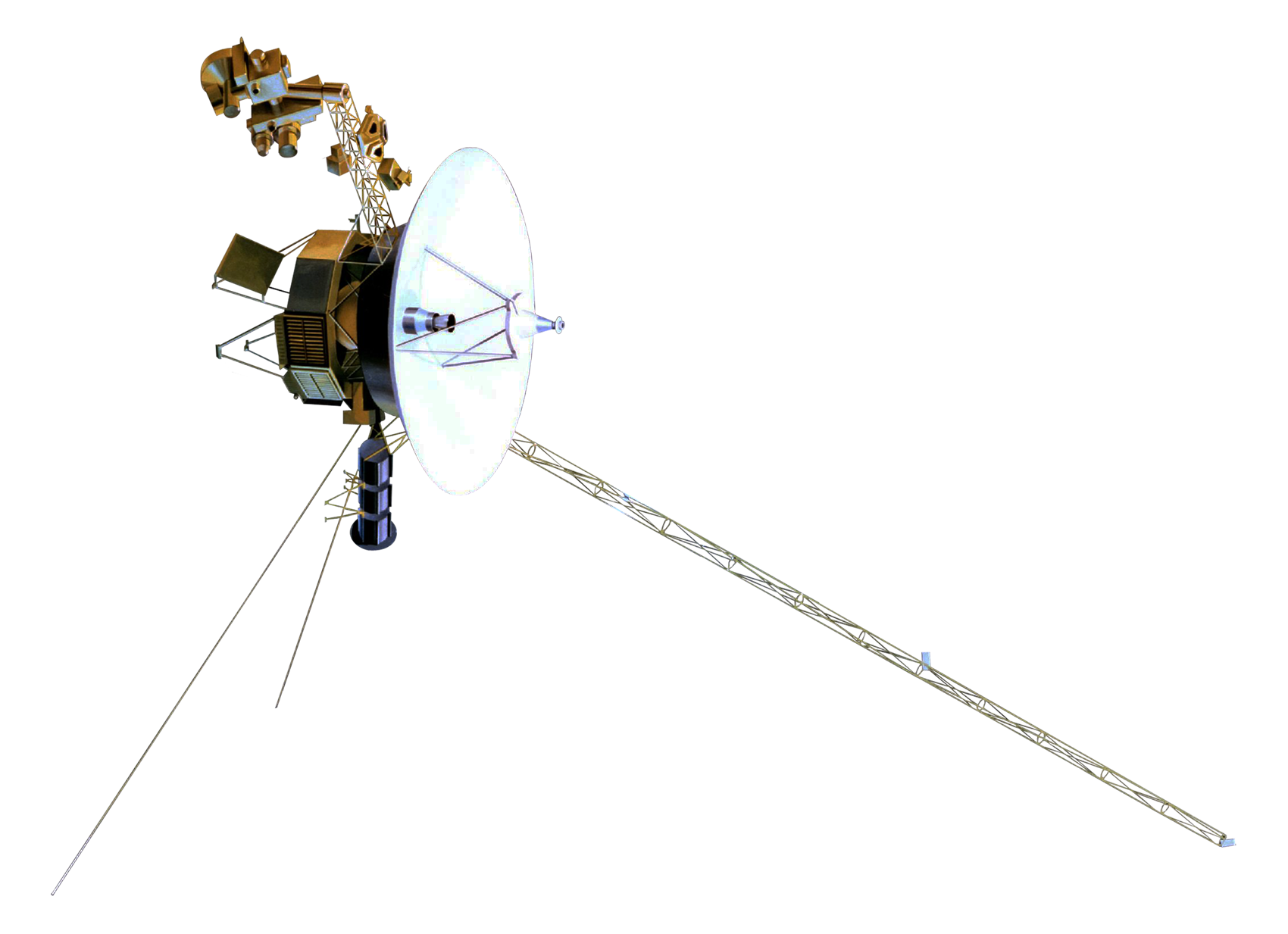
- Artist's rendering of the Voyager spacecraft design
- Mission type: Planetary exploration
- Operator: NASA / JPL
- COSPAR ID: 1977-076A
- SATCAT no.: 10271
- Website: science.nasa.gov/mission/voyager/
- Mission duration: Total: 49 years, 93 days (elapsed); Planetary mission: 12 years, 1 month, 12 days; Interstellar mission: 37 years, 50 days (elapsed)

Spacecraft properties
- Manufacturer: Jet Propulsion Laboratory
- Launch mass: 721.9 kg (1,592 lb)
- Power: 470 watts (at launch)

Start of mission
- Launch date: August 20, 1977, 14:29:00 UTC
- Rocket: Titan IIIE
- Launch site: Cape Canaveral LC-41

Flyby of Jupiter
- Closest approach: July 9, 1979
- Distance: 570,000 kilometers (350,000 mi)

Flyby of Saturn
- Closest approach: August 26, 1981
- Distance: 101,000 km (63,000 mi)

Flyby of Uranus
- Closest approach: January 24, 1986
- Distance: 81,500 km (50,600 mi)

Flyby of Neptune
- Closest approach: August 25, 1989
- Distance: 4,951 km (3,076 mi)
Instruments
- ISS: Imaging Science System
- RSS: Radio Science System
- IRIS: Infrared interferometer spectrometer and radiometer
- UVS: Ultraviolet Spectrometer
- MAG: Triaxial Fluxgate Magnetometer
- PLS: Plasma Spectrometer
- LECP: Low Energy Charged Particle Instrument
- CRS: Cosmic Ray System
- PRA: Planetary Radio Astronomy Investigation
- PPS: Photopolarimeter System
- PWS: Plasma Wave Subsystem
- Large Strategic Science Missions; Planetary Science Division Voyager program

Heliocentric positions of the five interstellar probes (squares) and other bodies (circles) until 2030, with launch and flyby dates. Markers denote positions on 1 January of each year, with every fifth year labelled. Plot 1 is viewed from the north ecliptic pole, to scale. Plots 2 to 4 are third-angle projections at 20% scale. In the SVG file, hover over a trajectory or orbit to highlight it and its associated launches and flybys.

Voyager 2 is a space probe launched by NASA on August 20, 1977, as a part of the Voyager program. It was launched on a trajectory towards the gas giants (Jupiter and Saturn) and enabled further encounters with the ice giants (Uranus and Neptune). The only spacecraft to have visited either of the ice giant planets, it was the third of five spacecraft to achieve Solar escape velocity, which allowed it to leave the Solar System. Launched 16 days before its twin Voyager 1, the primary mission of the spacecraft was to study the outer planets and its extended mission is to study interstellar space beyond the Sun's heliosphere.

Voyager 2 successfully fulfilled its primary mission of visiting the Jovian system in 1979, the Saturnian system in 1981, Uranian system in 1986, and the Neptunian system in 1989. The spacecraft is now in its extended mission of studying the interstellar medium. It is at a distance of 143.05 AU (21.4 billion km; 13.3 billion mi) from Earth as of February 2026.

The probe entered the interstellar medium on November 5, 2018, at a distance of 119.7 AU (11.1 billion mi; 17.9 billion km) from the Sun and moving at 15.341 km/s (34,320 mph) relative to the Sun. Voyager 2 has left the Sun's heliosphere and is traveling through the interstellar medium, though still inside the Solar System, joining Voyager 1, which reached the interstellar medium in 2012. Voyager 2 has begun to provide the first direct measurements of the density and temperature of the interstellar plasma.

Voyager 2 is in contact with Earth through the NASA Deep Space Network. Communications are the responsibility of Australia's DSS 43 communication antenna, part of the Canberra communication complex; the craft's southern trajectory puts it out of range of the network's Goldstone and Madrid complexes.

== History ==
=== Background ===
In the early space age, it was realized that a periodic alignment of the outer planets would occur in the late 1970s and enable a single probe to visit Jupiter, Saturn, Uranus, and Neptune by taking advantage of the then-new technique of gravity assists. NASA began work on a Grand Tour, which evolved into a massive project involving two groups of two probes each, with one group visiting Jupiter, Saturn, and Pluto and the other Jupiter, Uranus, and Neptune. The spacecraft would be designed with redundant systems to ensure survival throughout the entire tour. By 1972 the mission was scaled back and replaced with two Mariner program-derived spacecraft, the Mariner Jupiter–Saturn probes. To keep apparent lifetime program costs low, the mission would include only flybys of Jupiter and Saturn, but keep the Grand Tour option open. As the program progressed, the name was changed to Voyager.Voyager 2 was initially planned as Mariner 12 of the Mariner program.

The primary mission of Voyager 1 was to explore Jupiter, Saturn, and Saturn's largest moon, Titan. Voyager 2 was also to explore Jupiter and Saturn, but on a trajectory that would have the option of continuing on to Uranus and Neptune, or being redirected to Titan as a backup for Voyager 1. Upon successful completion of Voyager 1's objectives, Voyager 2 would get a mission extension to send the probe on towards Uranus and Neptune. Titan was selected due to the interest developed after the images taken by Pioneer 11 in 1979, which had indicated the atmosphere of the moon was substantial and complex. Hence the trajectory was designed for optimum Titan flyby.

=== Spacecraft design ===
Constructed by the California-based Jet Propulsion Laboratory (JPL), Voyager 2, whose bus is shaped like a decagonal prism, included 16 hydrazine thrusters, three-axis stabilization, gyroscopes and celestial referencing instruments (a Sun sensor, and a Canopus star tracker) to maintain pointing of the high-gain antenna toward Earth. Collectively these instruments are part of the Attitude and Articulation Control Subsystem (AACS) along with redundant units of most instruments and 8 backup thrusters. The spacecraft also included 11 scientific instruments to study celestial objects as it traveled through space.

==== Communications ====
Built with the intent for eventual interstellar travel, Voyager 2 included a large, 3.7 m (12 ft) parabolic, high-gain antenna (see diagram) to transceive data via the Deep Space Network on Earth. Communications are conducted over the S-band (about 13 cm wavelength) and X-band (about 3.6 cm wavelength), providing data rates of up to 115.2 kilobits per second at the distance of Jupiter; this rates decreases according to inverse-square law as it travels farther away from Earth. When the spacecraft is out of line-of-sight and unable to communicate, a digital tape recorder (DTR) can record about 64 megabytes of data for transmission at a later time.

==== Power ====
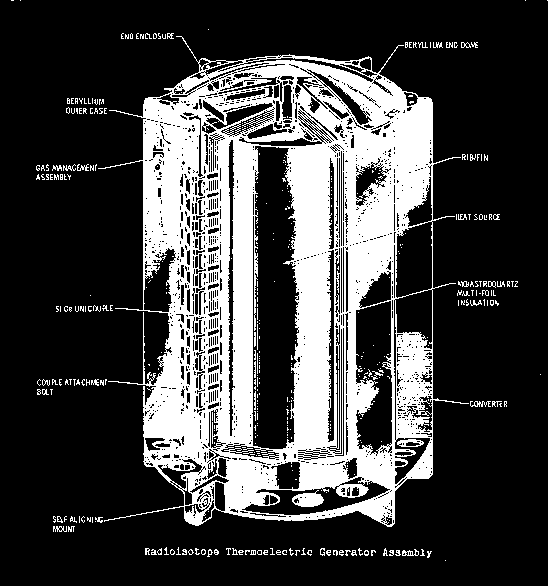
Voyager RTG unit

Voyager 2 is equipped with three multihundred-watt radioisotope thermoelectric generators (MHW RTGs). Each RTG includes 24 pressed plutonium oxide spheres. At launch, each RTG provided enough heat to generate approximately 157 W of electrical power. Collectively, the RTGs supplied the spacecraft with 470 watts at launch (halving every 87.7 years). They were predicted to allow operations to continue until at least 2020, and continued to provide power to five scientific instruments through the early part of 2023. In April 2023 JPL began using a reservoir of backup power intended for an onboard safety mechanism. As a result, all five instruments had been expected to continue operation through 2026.

However, in October 2024, NASA announced that the plasma science instrument had been turned off on September 26, 2024, preserving power for the remaining four instruments. In March 2025, NASA announced its plans to shut off Voyager 2’s low-energy charged particle (LECP) instrument also on March 24, 2025 to manage the gradually diminishing power supply while continuing to keep three science instruments operational.

On August 4, 2026, engineers at NASA's Jet Propulsion Laboratory announced the successful completion of a delicate "simultaneous" swap of multiple power-consuming devices for lower-power alternatives available aboard Voyager 2 that freed up power to keep all three of the spacecraft's remaining science instruments usable for at least one additional year. This procedure which was internally nicknamed "Big Bang" required switching off a set of powered devices aboard Voyager 2 and substituting them with lower-power alternatives, all the while ensuring the spacecraft remains warm enough to continue operating in the near absolute zero temperatures of interstellar space. Without this activity, the mission would have had to turn off another instrument on Voyager 2 before the end of 2026.

==== Attitude control and propulsion ====
Because of the energy required to achieve a Jupiter trajectory boost with an 825-kilogram (1,819 lb) payload, the spacecraft included a propulsion module made of a 1,123-kilogram (2,476 lb) solid-rocket motor and eight hydrazine monopropellant rocket engines, four providing pitch and yaw attitude control, and four for roll control. The propulsion module was jettisoned shortly after the successful Jupiter burn.

Sixteen hydrazine Aerojet MR-103 thrusters on the mission module provide attitude control. Four are used to execute trajectory correction maneuvers; the others in two redundant six-thruster branches, to stabilize the spacecraft on its three axes. Only one branch of attitude control thrusters is needed at any time.

Thrusters are supplied by a single 70-centimeter (28 in) diameter spherical titanium tank. It contained 100 kilograms (220 lb) of hydrazine at launch, providing enough fuel to last until 2034.

==== Scientific instruments ====
Structure of the Voyager spacecraft
Hover over a number or a list item to highlight that part. The spacecraft is shown without thermal blankets.
1High-gain antenna
A 3.7 m parabolic dish used to communicate with Earth through the NASA Deep Space Network.
2Bus
The ten-sided main body. It houses the electronics, the onboard computers and the digital tape recorder.
3Narrow-angle camera
Narrow-angle camera of the Imaging Science System (ISS), used for high-resolution images. Switched off in 1990.
4Wide-angle camera
Wide-angle camera of the Imaging Science System (ISS). Switched off in 1990.
5Plasma spectrometer
Measured the properties of plasma ions and electrons between 5 eV and 1 keV. Switched off in 2007 after its performance degraded.
6Cosmic Ray System
Studied the origin, acceleration and behaviour of interstellar cosmic rays. Switched off in 2025 to save power.
7Ultraviolet spectrometer
A spectrometer that measured atmospheric properties and radiation. Switched off in 2016.
8Infrared spectrometer and radiometer
Studied the energy balance, atmospheric composition and temperature profiles of planets and moons. Switched off in 1998.
9Photopolarimeter
A telescope with a polarizer, used to study the surfaces and atmospheres of Jupiter and Saturn. No longer working.
10Low-energy charged particle detector
Measured the energy fluxes of ions and electrons. Its data helped show that the probe had left the heliosphere. Switched off in 2026.
11Hydrazine thrusters (16)
Hydrazine thrusters used to control the spacecraft's attitude and keep the antenna pointed at Earth.
12Optical calibration target and radiator
A plate used to calibrate the cameras and optical instruments, and a radiator that sheds the spacecraft's heat.
13High-field magnetometers (2)
Magnetometers near the bus that measured the strong magnetic fields of the planets.
14Low-field magnetometers (2)
Mounted at the middle and the tip of the 13 m boom, away from the spacecraft's own magnetic field. They measure the weak interplanetary and interstellar fields. Still operating.
15Planetary radio astronomy and plasma wave antennas (2)
Two 10 m antennas shared by the Planetary Radio Astronomy experiment (switched off in 2008) and the Plasma Wave Subsystem (still operating).
16Radioisotope thermoelectric generators (3)
The spacecraft's power source: they turn the heat from the decay of plutonium-238 into electricity. They produced about 470 W at launch.
1
High-gain antenna
A 3.7 m parabolic dish used to communicate with Earth through the NASA Deep Space Network.
2
Bus
The ten-sided main body. It houses the electronics, the onboard computers and the digital tape recorder.
3
Narrow-angle camera
Narrow-angle camera of the Imaging Science System (ISS), used for high-resolution images. Switched off in 1990.
4
Wide-angle camera
Wide-angle camera of the Imaging Science System (ISS). Switched off in 1990.
5
Plasma spectrometer
Measured the properties of plasma ions and electrons between 5 eV and 1 keV. Switched off in 2007 after its performance degraded.
6
Cosmic Ray System
Studied the origin, acceleration and behaviour of interstellar cosmic rays. Switched off in 2025 to save power.
7
Ultraviolet spectrometer
A spectrometer that measured atmospheric properties and radiation. Switched off in 2016.
8
Infrared spectrometer and radiometer
Studied the energy balance, atmospheric composition and temperature profiles of planets and moons. Switched off in 1998.
9
Photopolarimeter
A telescope with a polarizer, used to study the surfaces and atmospheres of Jupiter and Saturn. No longer working.
10
Low-energy charged particle detector
Measured the energy fluxes of ions and electrons. Its data helped show that the probe had left the heliosphere. Switched off in 2026.
11
Hydrazine thrusters (16)
Hydrazine thrusters used to control the spacecraft's attitude and keep the antenna pointed at Earth.
12
Optical calibration target and radiator
A plate used to calibrate the cameras and optical instruments, and a radiator that sheds the spacecraft's heat.
13
High-field magnetometers (2)
Magnetometers near the bus that measured the strong magnetic fields of the planets.
14
Low-field magnetometers (2)
Mounted at the middle and the tip of the 13 m boom, away from the spacecraft's own magnetic field. They measure the weak interplanetary and interstellar fields. Still operating.
15
Planetary radio astronomy and plasma wave antennas (2)
Two 10 m antennas shared by the Planetary Radio Astronomy experiment (switched off in 2008) and the Plasma Wave Subsystem (still operating).
16
Radioisotope thermoelectric generators (3)
The spacecraft's power source: they turn the heat from the decay of plutonium-238 into electricity. They produced about 470 W at launch.
Image credits

Instrument name	Abr.	Description
Imaging Science System (disabled)	(ISS)	A two-camera system (narrow-angle/wide-angle) provides imagery of the outer planets and other objects along the trajectory. Filters Narrow Angle Camera Filters: Name / Wavelength / Spectrum / Sensitivity; Clear / 280–640 nm; 460 nm center; UV / 280–370 nm; 325 nm center; Violet / 350–450 nm; 400 nm center; Blue / 430–530 nm; 480 nm center; ' / ' / / '; Green / 530–640 nm; 585 nm center; ' / ' / / '; Orange / 590–640 nm; 615 nm center; ' / ' / / '; Wide Angle Camera Filters: Name / Wavelength / Spectrum / Sensitivity; Clear / 280–640 nm; 460 nm center; ' / ' / / '; Violet / 350–450 nm; 400 nm center; Blue / 430–530 nm; 480 nm center; CH_{4}-U / 536–546 nm; 514 nm center; Green / 530–640 nm; 585 nm center; Na-D / 588–590 nm; 589 nm center; Orange / 590–640 nm; 615 nm center; CH_{4}-JST / 614–624 nm; 619 nm center; Data: PDS/PDI data catalog, PDS/PRN data catalog
Radio Science System (disabled)	(RSS)	Used the telecommunications system of the Voyager spacecraft to determine the physical properties of planets and satellites (ionospheres, atmospheres, masses, gravity fields, densities) and the amount and size distribution of material in Saturn's rings and the ring dimensions.: Data: PDS/PPI data catalog, PDS/PRN data catalog (VG_2803), NSSDC Saturn data archive
Infrared interferometer spectrometer and radiometer (disabled)	(IRIS)	Investigates both global and local energy balance and atmospheric composition. Vertical temperature profiles are also obtained from the planets and satellites as well as the composition, thermal properties, and size of particles in Saturn's rings.: Data: PDS/PRN data catalog, PDS/PRN expanded data catalog (VGIRIS_0001, VGIRIS_002)
Ultraviolet Spectrometer (disabled)	(UVS)	Designed to measure atmospheric properties, and to measure radiation.: Data: PDS/PRN data catalog
Triaxial Fluxgate Magnetometer (active)	(MAG)	Designed to investigate the magnetic fields of Jupiter and Saturn, the solar-wind interaction with the magnetospheres of these planets, and the interplanetary magnetic field out to the solar wind boundary with the interstellar magnetic field and beyond, if crossed.: Data: PDS/PPI data catalog, NSSDC data archive
Plasma Spectrometer (disabled)	(PLS)	Investigates the macroscopic properties of the plasma ions and measures electrons in the energy range from 5 eV to 1 keV.: Data: PDS/PPI data catalog, NSSDC data archive
Low Energy Charged Particle Instrument (disabled)	(LECP)	Measures the differential in energy fluxes and angular distributions of ions, electrons and the differential in energy ion composition.: Data: UMD data plotting, PDS/PPI data catalog, NSSDC data archive
Cosmic Ray System (active)	(CRS)	Determines the origin and acceleration process, life history, and dynamic contribution of interstellar cosmic rays, the nucleosynthesis of elements in cosmic-ray sources, the behavior of cosmic rays in the interplanetary medium, and the trapped planetary energetic-particle environment.: Data: PDS/PPI data catalog, NSSDC data archive
Planetary Radio Astronomy Investigation (disabled)	(PRA)	Uses a sweep-frequency radio receiver to study the radio-emission signals from Jupiter and Saturn.: Data: PDS/PPI data catalog
Photopolarimeter System (defective)	(PPS)	Used a telescope with a polarizer to gather information on surface texture and composition of Jupiter and Saturn and information on atmospheric scattering properties and density for both planets.: Data: PDS/PRN data catalog
Plasma Wave Subsystem (active)	(PWS)	Provides continuous, sheath-independent measurements of the electron-density profiles at Jupiter and Saturn as well as basic information on local wave-particle interaction, useful in studying the magnetospheres.: Data: PDS/PPI data catalog

Images of the spacecraft
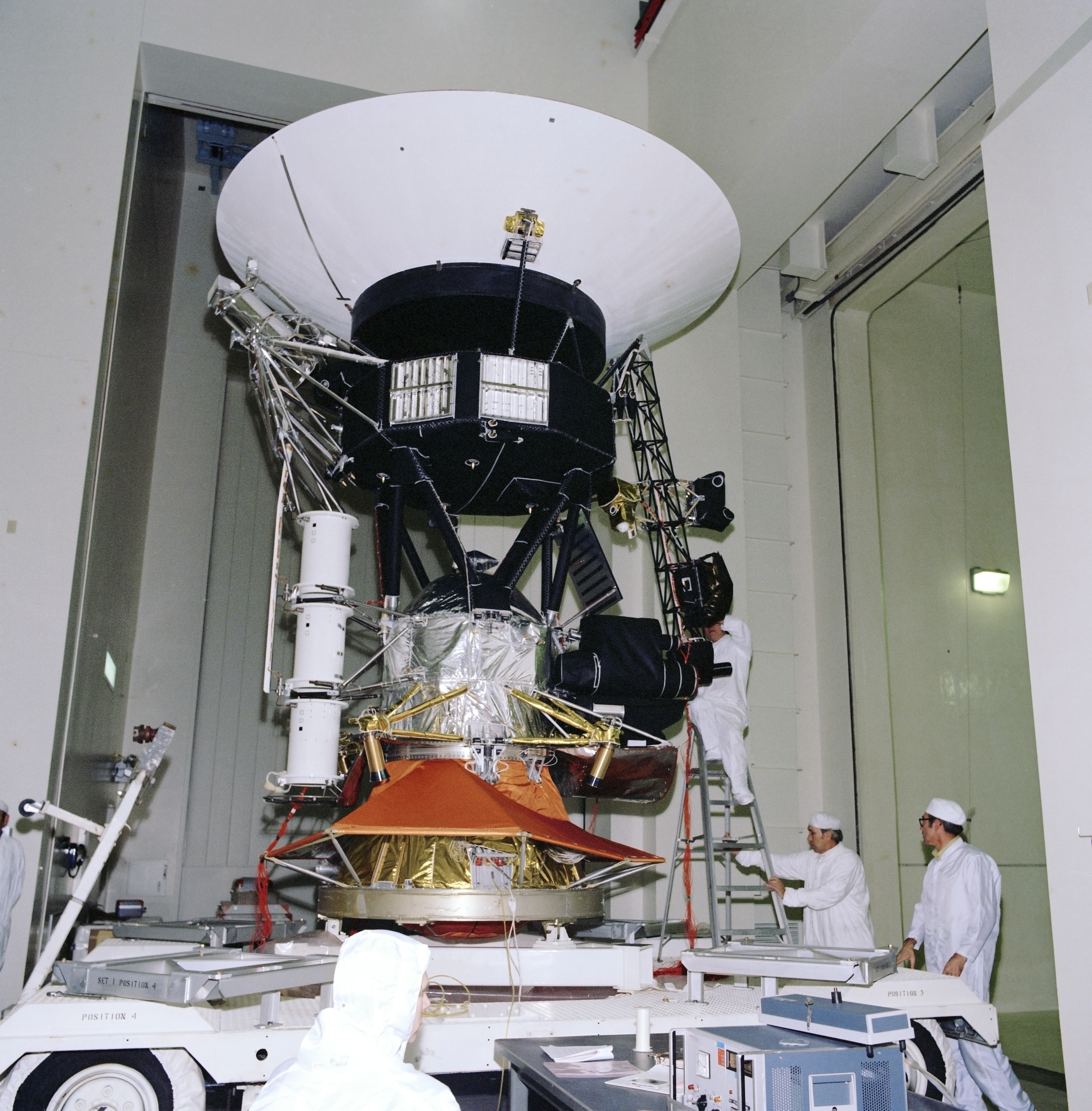
Voyager in transport to a solar thermal test chamber.

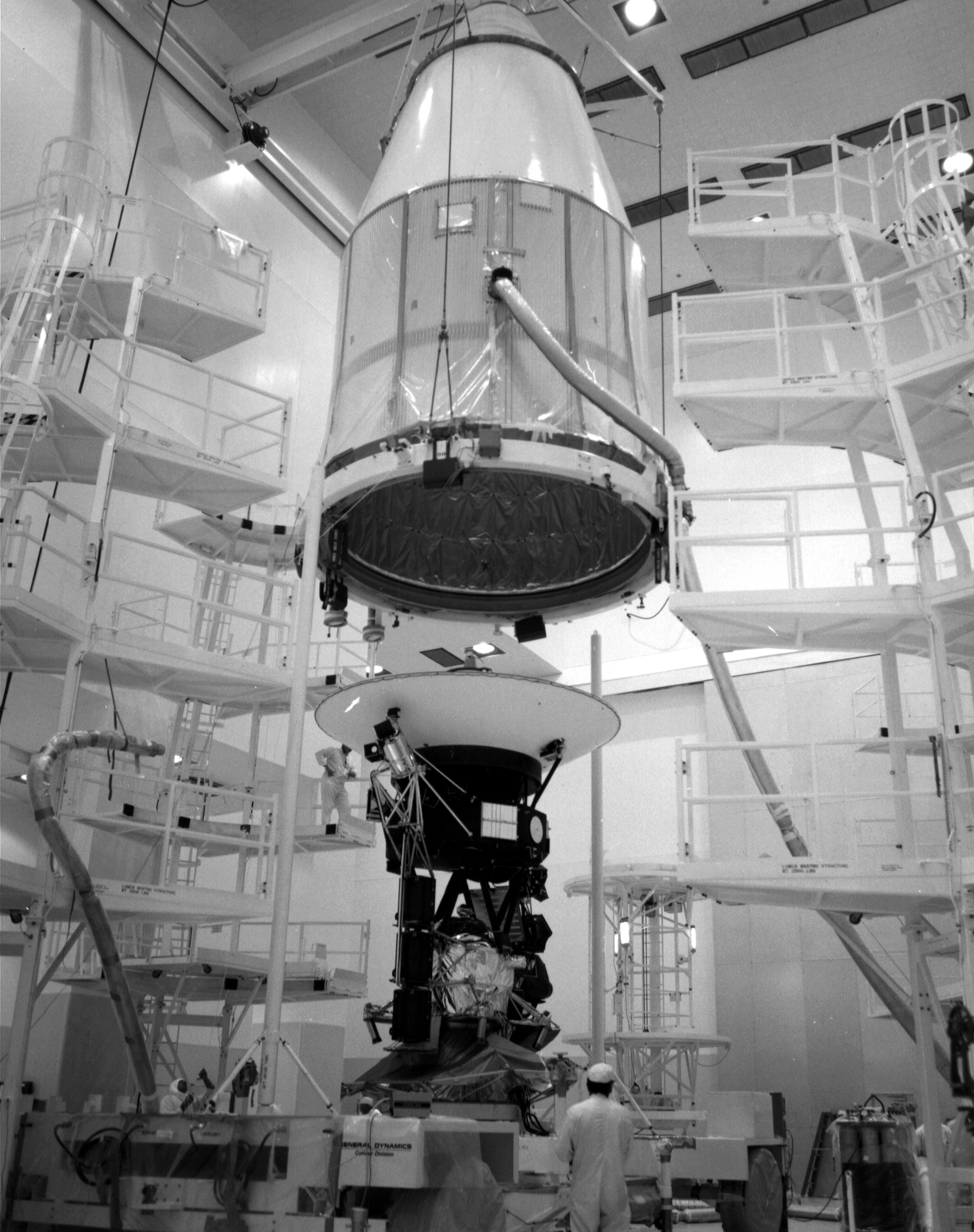
Voyager 2 awaiting payload entry into a Titan IIIE/Centaur rocket.

== Mission profile ==
Images of Voyager 2's trajectory
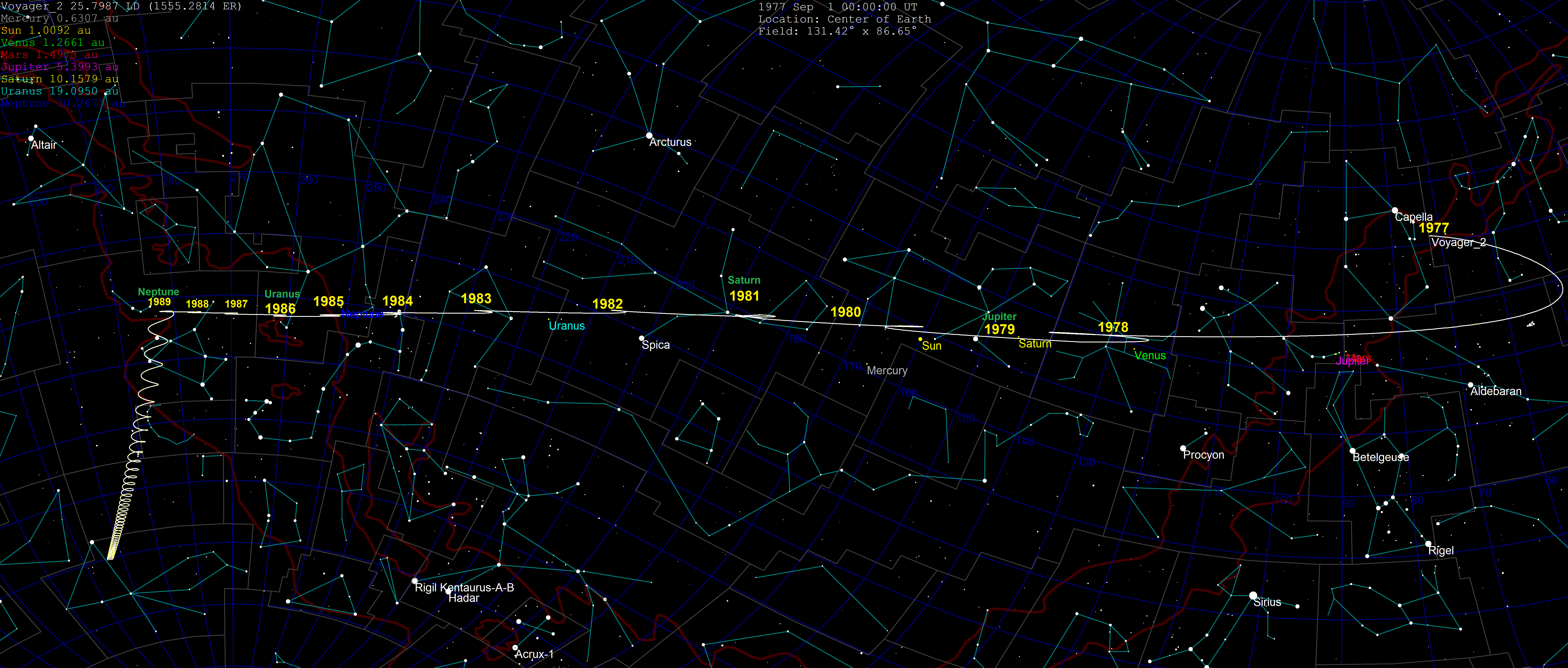
Voyager 2's trajectory from the Earth, following the ecliptic through 1989 at Neptune and now heading south into the constellation Pavo

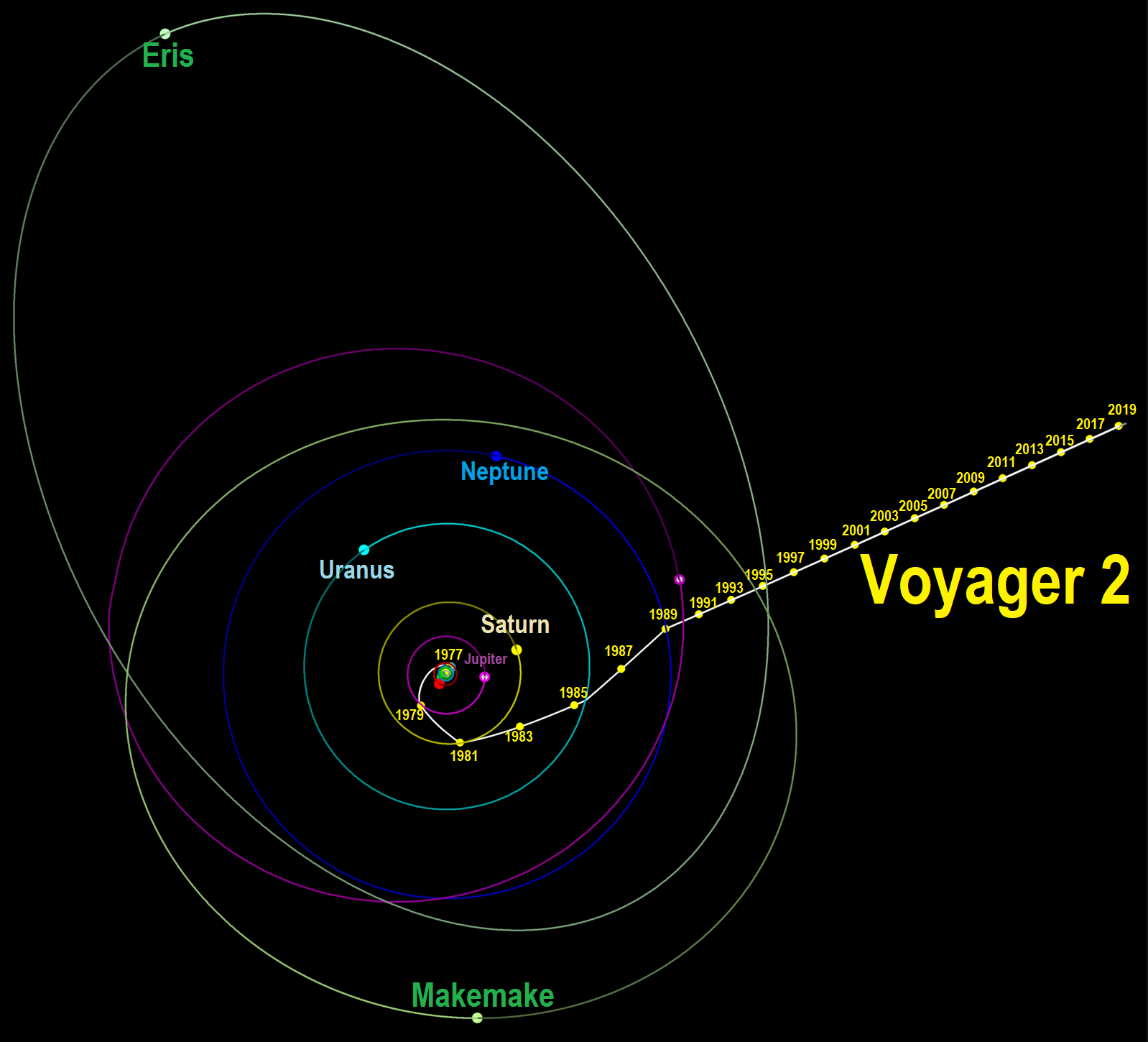
Path viewed from above the Solar System

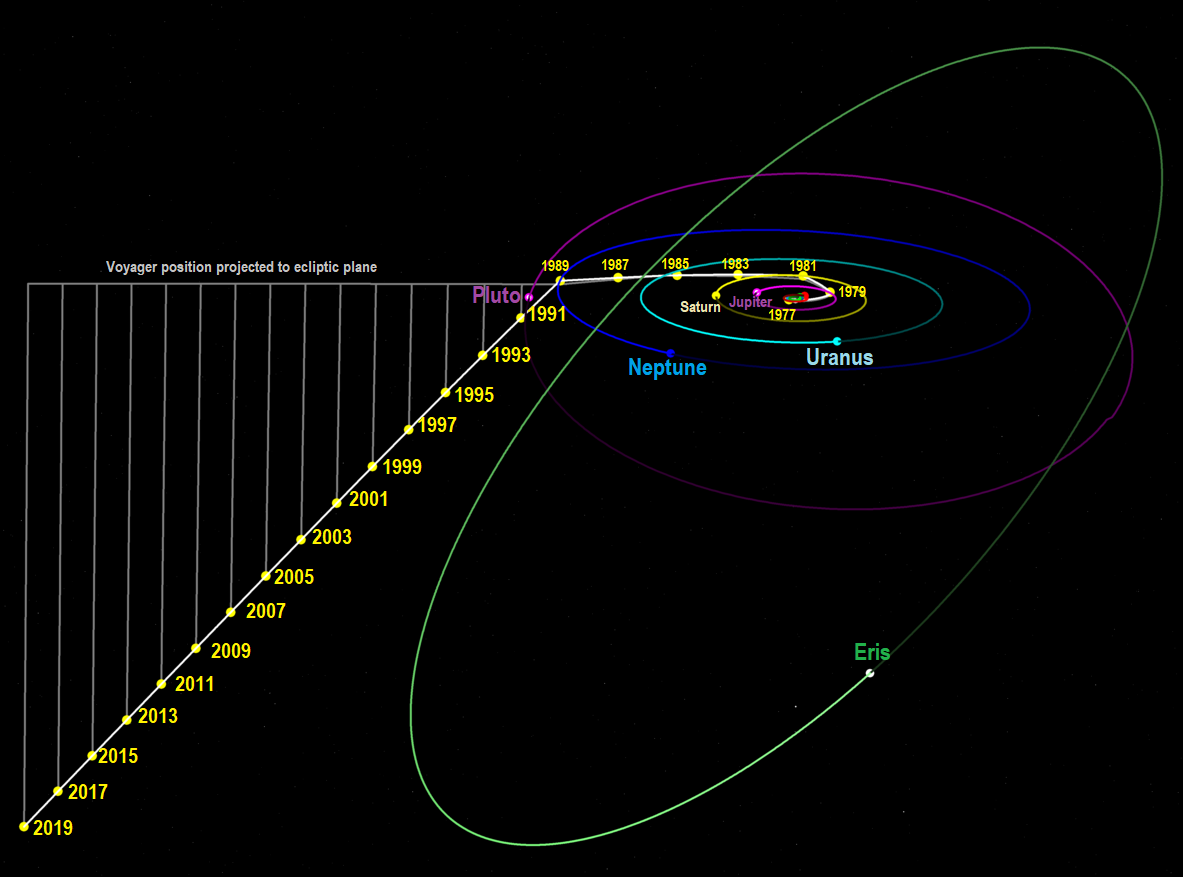
Path viewed from side, showing distance below ecliptic in gray

Timeline of travel
Date	Event
1977-08-20	Spacecraft launched at 14:29:00 UTC.
1977-12-10	Entered asteroid belt.
1977-12-19	Voyager 1 overtakes Voyager 2 (see diagram).
1978-06	Primary radio receiver fails. The remainder of the mission flown using backup.
1978-10-21	Exited asteroid belt.
1979-04-25	Start Jupiter observation phase.: Time / Event; 1979-07-08 / Encounter with Jovian system.; 12:21 / Callisto flyby at 214,930 km.; 1979-07-09; 07:14 / Ganymede flyby at 62,130 km.; 17:53 / Europa flyby at 205,720 km.; 20:01 / Amalthea flyby at 558,370 km.; 22:29 / Jupiter closest approach at 721,670 km from the center of mass.; 23:17 / Io flyby at 1,129,900 km.; 1979-08-05 / Phase Stop
1981-06-05	Start Saturn observation phase.: Time / Event; 1981-08-22 / Encounter with Saturnian system.; 01:26:57 / Iapetus flyby at 908,680 km.; 1981-08-25; 01:25:26 / Hyperion flyby at 431,370 km.; 09:37:46 / Titan flyby at 666,190 km.; 22:57:33 / Helene flyby at 314,090 km.; 1981-08-26; 01:04:32 / Dione flyby at 502,310 km.; 02:22:17 / Calypso flyby at 151,590 km.; 02:24:26 / Mimas flyby at 309,930 km.; 03:19:18 / Pandora flyby at 107,000 km.; 03:24:05 / Saturn closest approach at 161,000 km from the center of mass.; 03:33:02 / Atlas 287,000 km.; 03:45:16 / Enceladus flyby at 87,010 km.; 03:50:04 / Janus at 223,000 km.; 04:05:56 / Epimetheus at 147,000 km.; 06:02:47 / Telesto at 270,000 km.; 06:12:30 / Tethys flyby at 93,010 km.; 06:28:48 / Rhea flyby at 645,260 km.; 1981-09-04; 01:22:34 / Phoebe flyby at 2,075,640 km.; 1981-09-25 / Phase Stop
1985-11-04	Start Uranus observation phase.: Time / Event; 1986-01-24 / Encounter with Uranian system.; 16:50 / Miranda flyby at 29,000 km.; 17:25 / Ariel flyby at 127,000 km.; 17:25 / Umbriel flyby at 325,000 km.; 17:25 / Titania flyby at 365,200 km.; 17:25 / Oberon flyby at 470,600 km.; 17:59:47 / Uranus closest approach at 107,000 km from the center of mass.; 1986-02-25 / Phase Stop
1989-06-05	Start Neptune observation phase.: Time / Event; 1989-08-25 / Encounter with Neptunian system.; 03:56:36 / Neptune closest approach at 4,950 km.; 04:41 / Galatea flyby at 18,360 km.; 04:51 / Larissa flyby at 60,180 km.; 05:29 / Proteus flyby at 97,860 km.; 09:23 / Triton flyby at 39,800 km.; 1989-10-02 / Phase Stop
1989-10-02	Begin Voyager Interstellar Mission.
Interstellar phase
1998-11-13	Terminate scan platform and UV observations.
2007-09-06	Terminate data tape recorder operations.
2008-02-22	Terminate planetary radio astronomy experiment operations.
2011-11-07	Switch to backup thrusters to conserve power.
2018-11-05	Crossed the heliopause and entered interstellar space.
2023-07-18	Voyager 2 overtook Pioneer 10 as the second farthest spacecraft from the Sun.
2024-09-26	Turned off the plasma science instrument.
2025-03-24	Turned off the low-energy charged particle instrument.

=== Launch and trajectory ===
The Voyager 2 probe was launched on August 20, 1977, by NASA from Space Launch Complex 41 at Cape Canaveral, Florida, aboard a Titan IIIE/Centaur launch vehicle. Two weeks later, the twin Voyager 1 probe was launched on September 5, 1977. However, Voyager 1 reached both Jupiter and Saturn sooner, as Voyager 2 had been launched into a longer, more circular trajectory.

Voyager 1's initial orbit had an aphelion of 8.9 AU (830 million mi; 1.33 billion km), just a little short of Saturn's orbit of 9.5 AU (880 million mi; 1.42 billion km). Whereas, Voyager 2's initial orbit had an aphelion of 6.2 AU (580 million mi; 930 million km), well short of Saturn's orbit.

In April 1978, no commands were transmitted to Voyager 2 for a period of time, causing the spacecraft to switch from its primary radio receiver to its backup receiver. Sometime afterwards, the primary receiver failed altogether. The backup receiver was functional, but a failed capacitor in the receiver meant that it could only receive transmissions that were sent at a precise frequency, and this frequency would be affected by the Earth's rotation (due to the Doppler effect) and the onboard receiver's temperature, among other things.

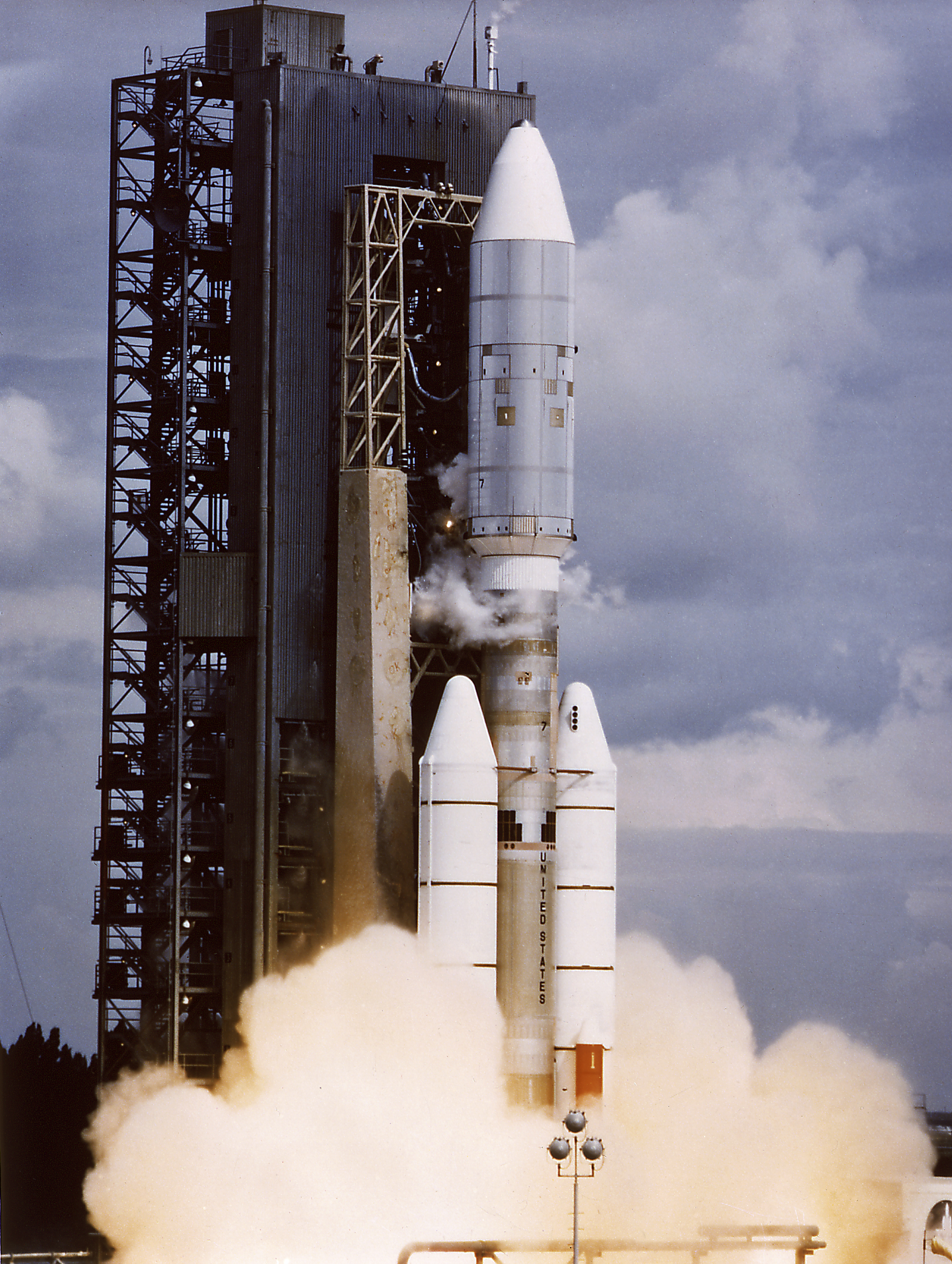
Voyager 2 launch on August 20, 1977, with a Titan IIIE/Centaur

Animation of Voyager 2's trajectory from August 20, 1977, to December 30, 2000
Voyager 2 · Earth · Jupiter · Saturn · Uranus · Neptune · Sun

Trajectory of Voyager 2 primary mission

Plot of Voyager 2's distance from, and velocity with respect to, the Sun, illustrating the use of gravity assists to accelerate the spacecraft by Jupiter, Saturn and Uranus. (Note: To observe Triton, Voyager 2 passed over Neptune's north pole, resulting in an acceleration out of the plane of the ecliptic, and, as a result, a reduced velocity relative to the Sun.)

=== Encounter with Jupiter ===
Animation of Voyager 2's trajectory around Jupiter Voyager 2 · Jupiter · Io · Europa · Ganymede · Callisto

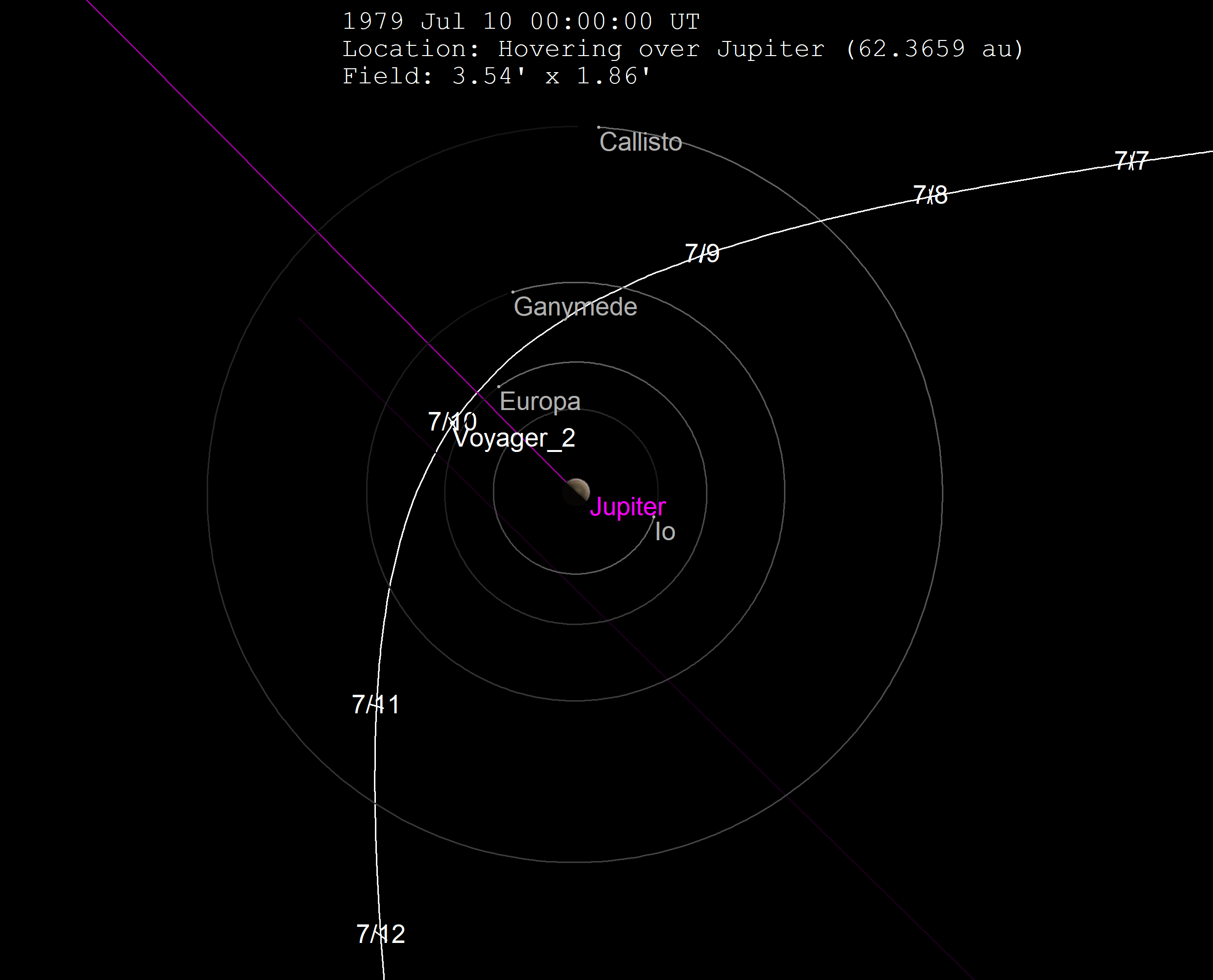
The trajectory of Voyager 2 through the Jovian system

Voyager 2's closest approach to Jupiter occurred at 22:29 UT on July 9, 1979. It came within 570,000 km (350,000 mi) of the planet's cloud tops. Jupiter's Great Red Spot was revealed as a complex storm moving in a counterclockwise direction. Other smaller storms and eddies were found throughout the banded clouds.

Voyager 2 returned images of Jupiter, as well as its moons Amalthea, Io, Callisto, Ganymede, and Europa. During a 10-hour "volcano watch", it confirmed Voyager 1's observations of active volcanism on the moon Io, and revealed how the moon's surface had changed in the four months since the previous visit. Together, the Voyagers observed the eruption of nine volcanoes on Io, and there is evidence that other eruptions occurred between the two Voyager fly-bys.

Jupiter's moon Europa displayed a large number of intersecting linear features in the low-resolution photos from Voyager 1. At first, scientists believed the features might be deep cracks, caused by crustal rifting or tectonic processes. Closer high-resolution photos from Voyager 2, however, were puzzling: the features lacked topographic relief, and one scientist said they "might have been painted on with a felt marker". Europa is internally active due to tidal heating at a level about one-tenth that of Io. Europa is thought to have a thin crust (less than 30 km (19 mi) thick) of water ice, possibly floating on a 50 km (31 mi)-deep ocean.

Two new, small satellites, Adrastea and Metis, were found orbiting just outside the ring. A third new satellite, Thebe, was discovered between the orbits of Amalthea and Io.

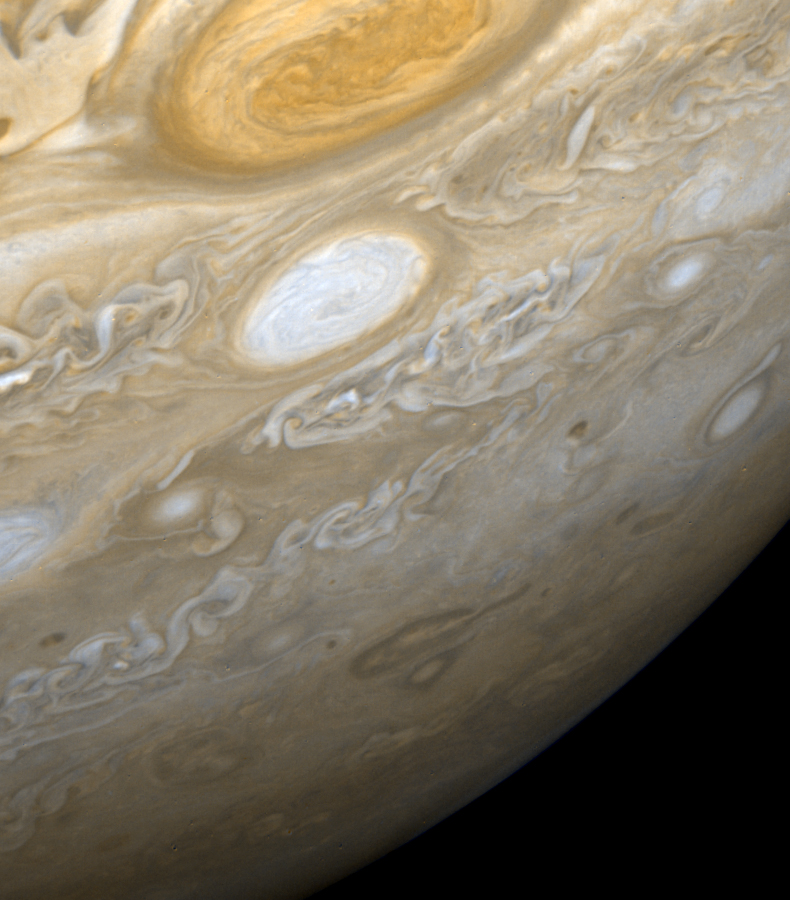
The Great Red Spot photographed during the Voyager 2 flyby of Jupiter

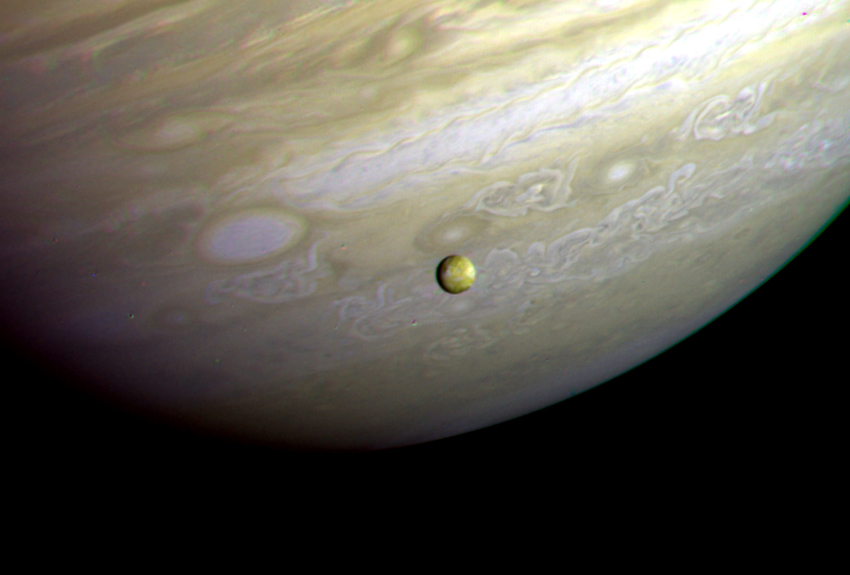
A transit of Io across Jupiter, July 9, 1979

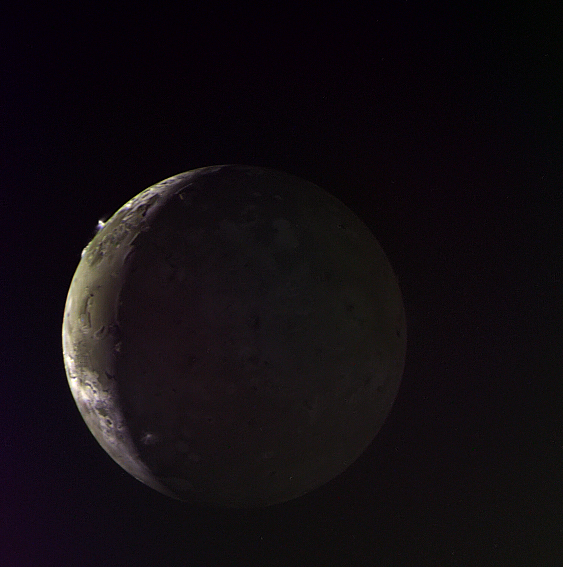
Several faint volcanic eruptions on Io, photographed by Voyager 2

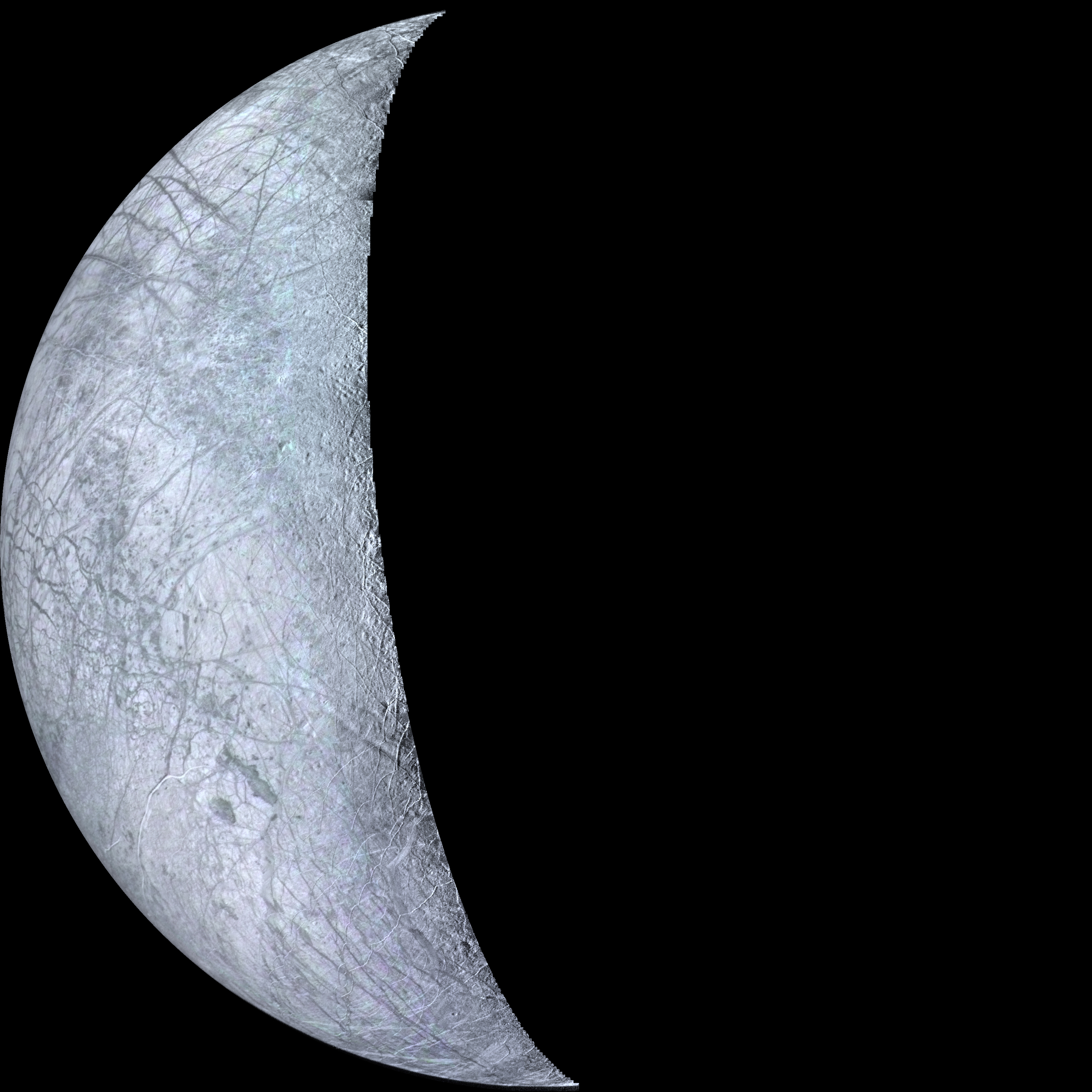
A color mosaic of Europa

=== Encounter with Saturn ===
The closest approach to Saturn occurred at 03:24:05 UT on August 26, 1981. When Voyager 2 passed behind Saturn, viewed from Earth, it uses its radio link to investigate Saturn's upper atmosphere, gathering data on both temperature and pressure. In the highest regions of the atmosphere, where the pressure was measured at 70 mbar (1.0 psi), Voyager 2 recorded a temperature of 82 K (−191.2 °C; −312.1 °F). Deeper within the atmosphere, where the pressure was recorded to be 1,200 mbar (17 psi), the temperature rose to 143 K (−130 °C; −202 °F). The spacecraft also observed that the north pole was approximately 10 °C (18 °F) cooler at 100 mbar (1.5 psi) than mid-latitudes, a variance potentially attributable to seasonal shifts (see also Saturn Oppositions).

After its Saturn fly-by, Voyager 2's scan platform experienced an anomaly causing its azimuth actuator to seize. This malfunction led to some data loss and posed challenges for the spacecraft's continued mission. The anomaly was traced back to a combination of issues, including a design flaw in the actuator shaft bearing and gear lubrication system, corrosion, and debris build-up. While overuse and depleted lubricant were factors, other elements, such as dissimilar metal reactions and a lack of relief ports, compounded the problem. Engineers on the ground were able to issue a series of commands, rectifying the issue to a degree that allowed the scan platform to resume its function. Voyager 2, which would have been diverted to perform the Titan flyby if Voyager 1 had been unable to, did not pass near Titan due to the malfunction, and subsequently, proceeded with its mission to explore the Uranian system.

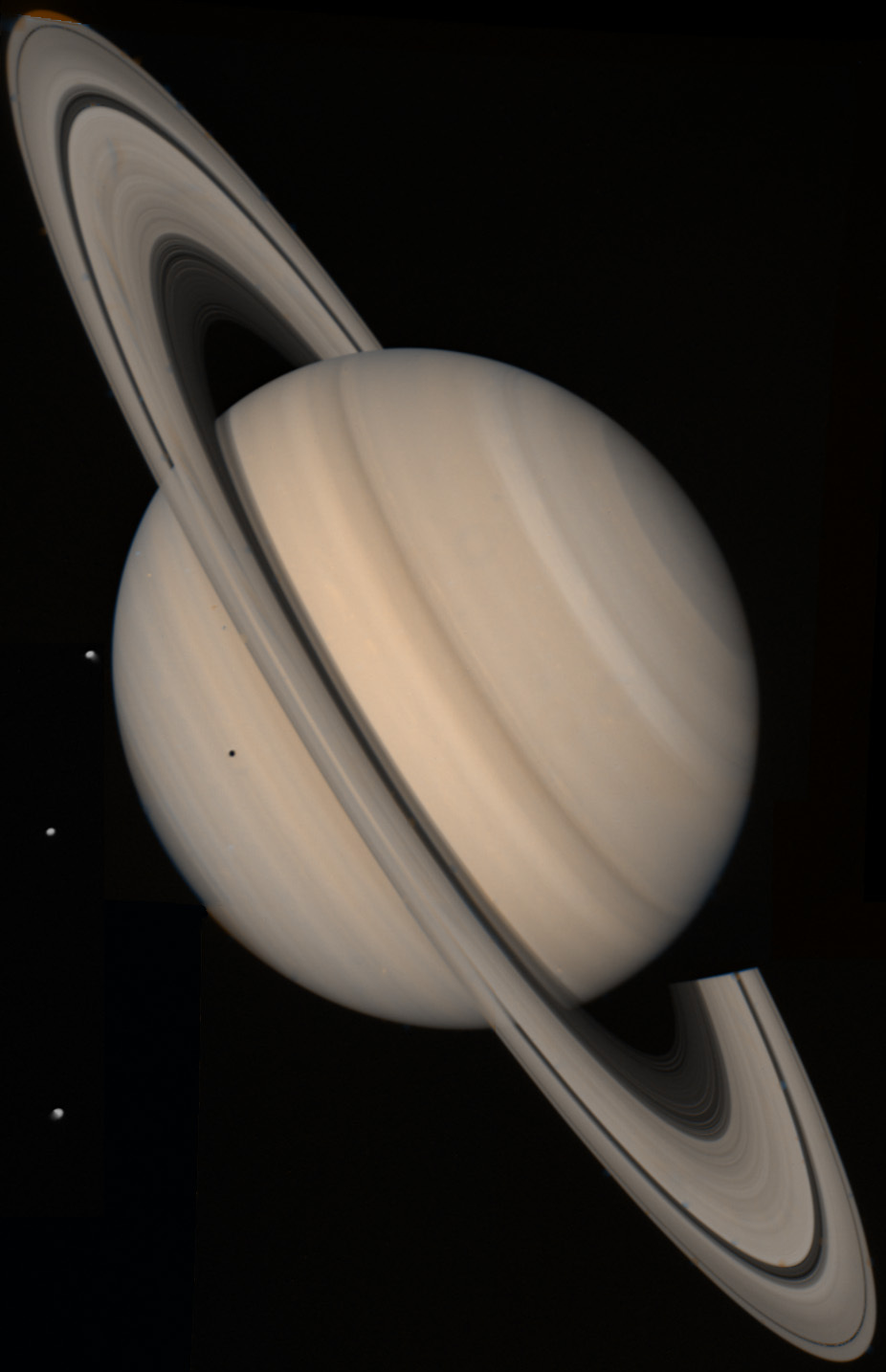
Voyager 2 Saturn approach view

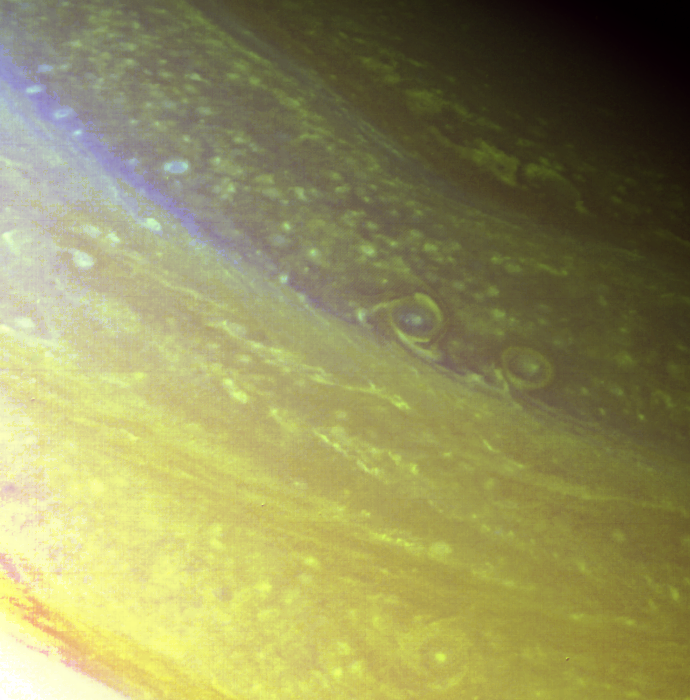
North, polar region of Saturn imaged in orange and UV filters

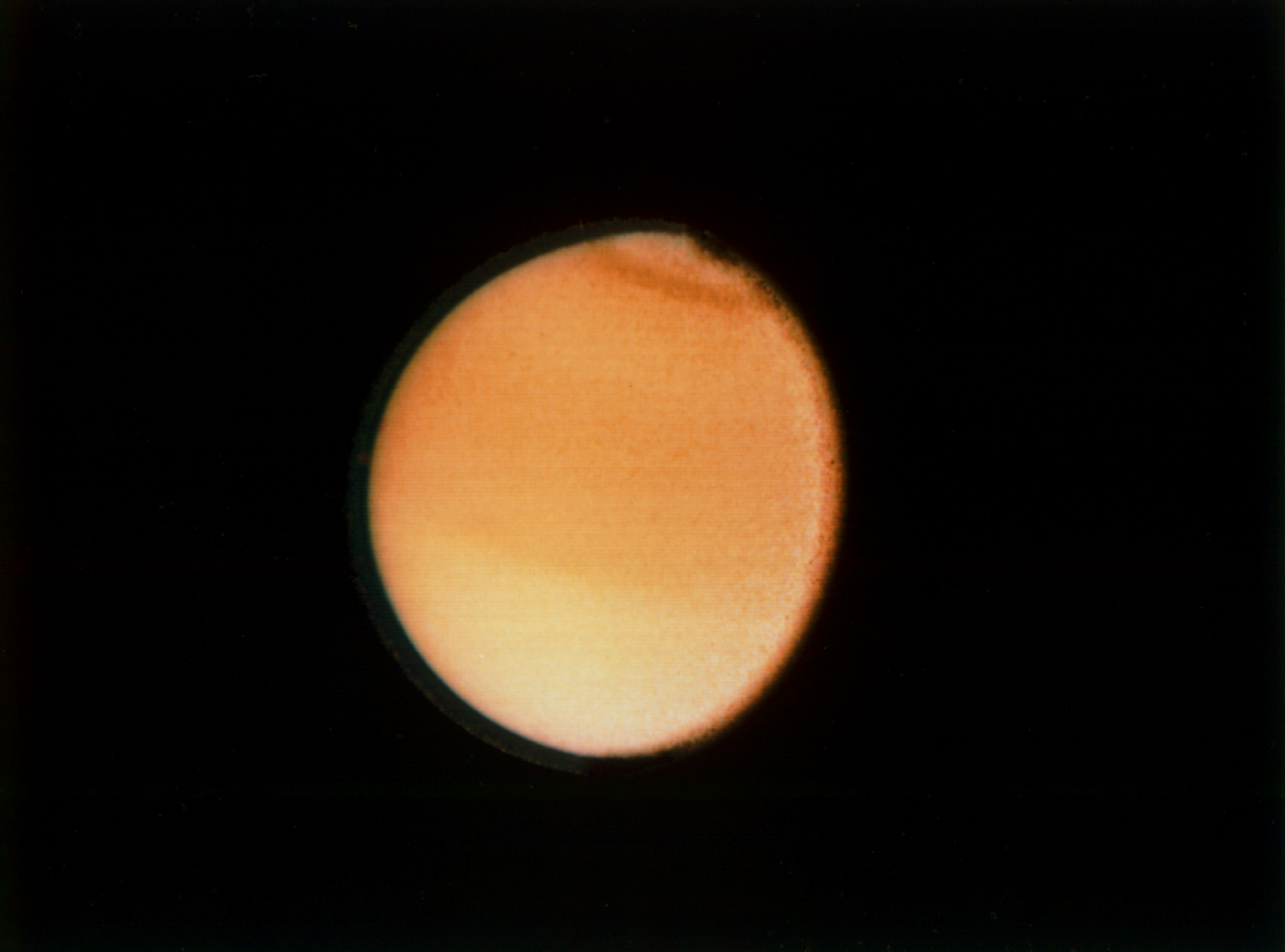
Atmosphere of Titan imaged from 2.3 million km

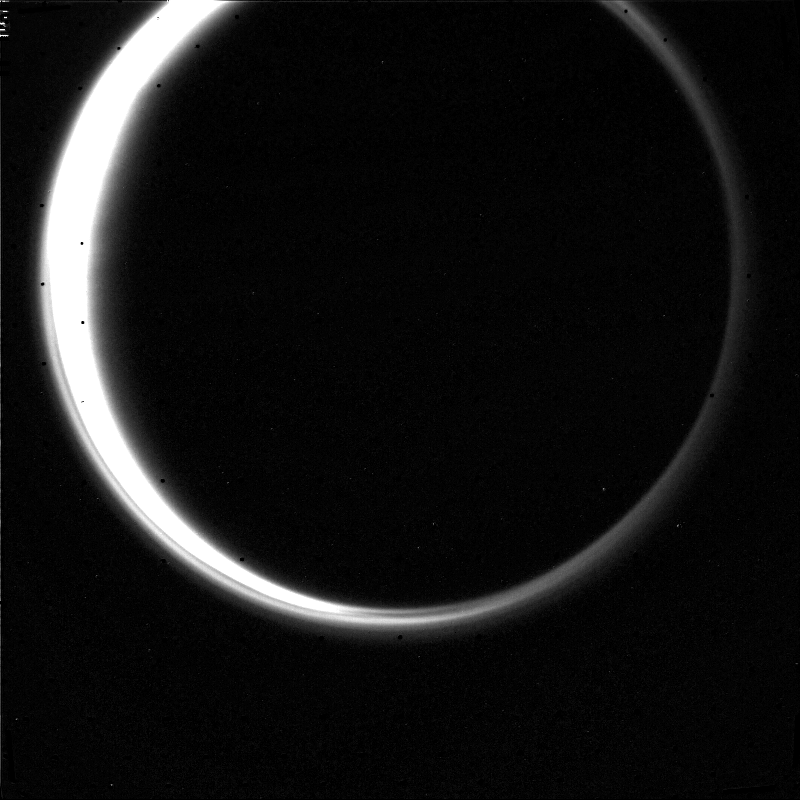
Titan occultation of the Sun from 0.9 million km

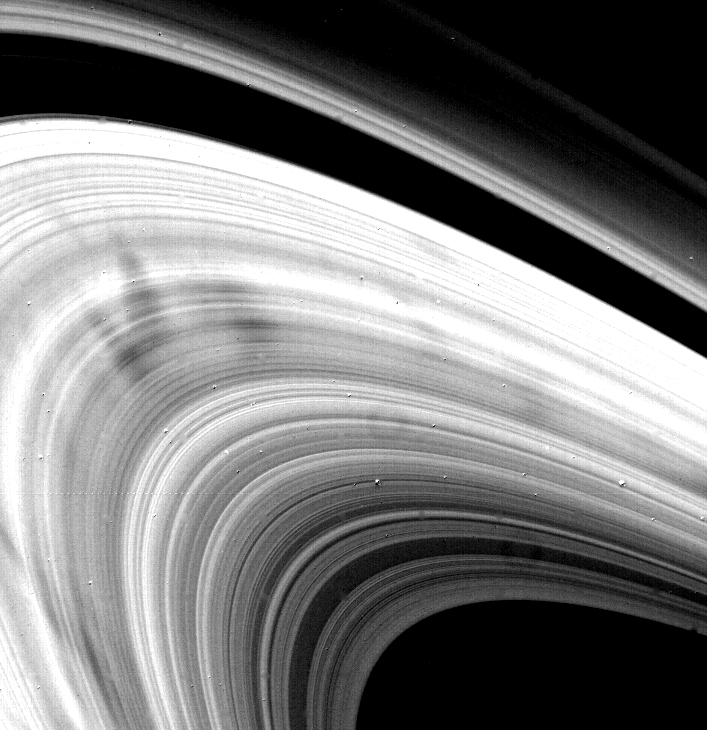
"Spoke" features observed in the rings of Saturn

=== Encounter with Uranus ===
The closest approach to Uranus occurred on January 24, 1986, when Voyager 2 came within 81,500 km (50,600 mi) of the planet's cloudtops. Voyager 2 also discovered 11 previously unknown moons: Cordelia, Ophelia, Bianca, Cressida, Desdemona, Juliet, Portia, Rosalind, Belinda, Puck and Perdita. (Note: Some sources cite the discovery of only 10 Uranian moons by Voyager 2, but Perdita was discovered in Voyager 2 images more than a decade after they were taken.) The mission also studied the planet's unique atmosphere, caused by its axial tilt of 97.8°, and examined the Uranian ring system. The length of a day on Uranus as measured by Voyager 2 is 17 hours, 14 minutes. Uranus was shown to have a magnetic field that was misaligned with its rotational axis, unlike other planets that had been visited to that point, and a helix-shaped magnetic tail stretching 10 million km (6.2 million mi) away from the Sun.

When Voyager 2 visited Uranus, much of its cloud features were hidden by a layer of haze; however, false-color and contrast-enhanced images show bands of concentric clouds around its south pole. This area was also found to radiate large amounts of ultraviolet light, a phenomenon that is called "dayglow". The average atmospheric temperature is about 60 K (−351.7 °F; −213.2 °C). The illuminated and dark poles, and most of the planet, exhibit nearly the same temperatures at the cloud tops.

The Voyager 2 Planetary Radio Astronomy (PRA) experiment observed 140 lightning flashes, or Uranian electrostatic discharges with a frequency of 0.9-40 MHz. The UEDs were detected from 600,000 km (370,000 mi) of Uranus over 24 hours, most of which were not visible. However, microphysical modeling suggests that Uranian lightning occurs in convective storms occurring in deep troposphere water clouds. If this is the case, lightning will not be visible due to the thick cloud layers above the troposphere. Uranian lightning has a power of around 10^{8} W, emits 1×10^7 J – 2×10^7 J of energy, and lasts an average of 120 ms.

Detailed images from Voyager 2's flyby of the Uranian moon Miranda showed huge canyons made from geological faults. One hypothesis suggests that Miranda might consist of a reaggregation of material following an earlier event when Miranda was shattered into pieces by a violent impact.

Voyager 2 discovered two previously unknown Uranian rings. Measurements showed that the Uranian rings are different from those at Jupiter and Saturn. The Uranian ring system might be relatively young, and it did not form at the same time that Uranus did. The particles that make up the rings might be the remnants of a moon that was broken up by either a high-velocity impact or torn up by tidal effects.

In March 2020, NASA astronomers reported the detection of a large atmospheric magnetic bubble, also known as a plasmoid, released into outer space from the planet Uranus, after reevaluating old data recorded during the flyby.

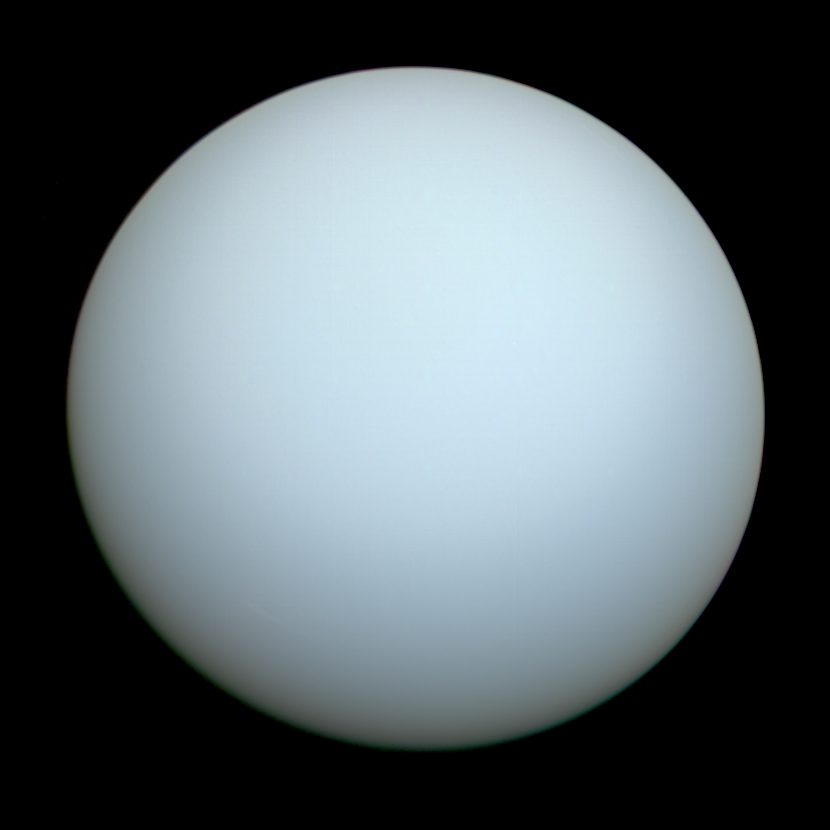
Uranus as viewed by Voyager 2

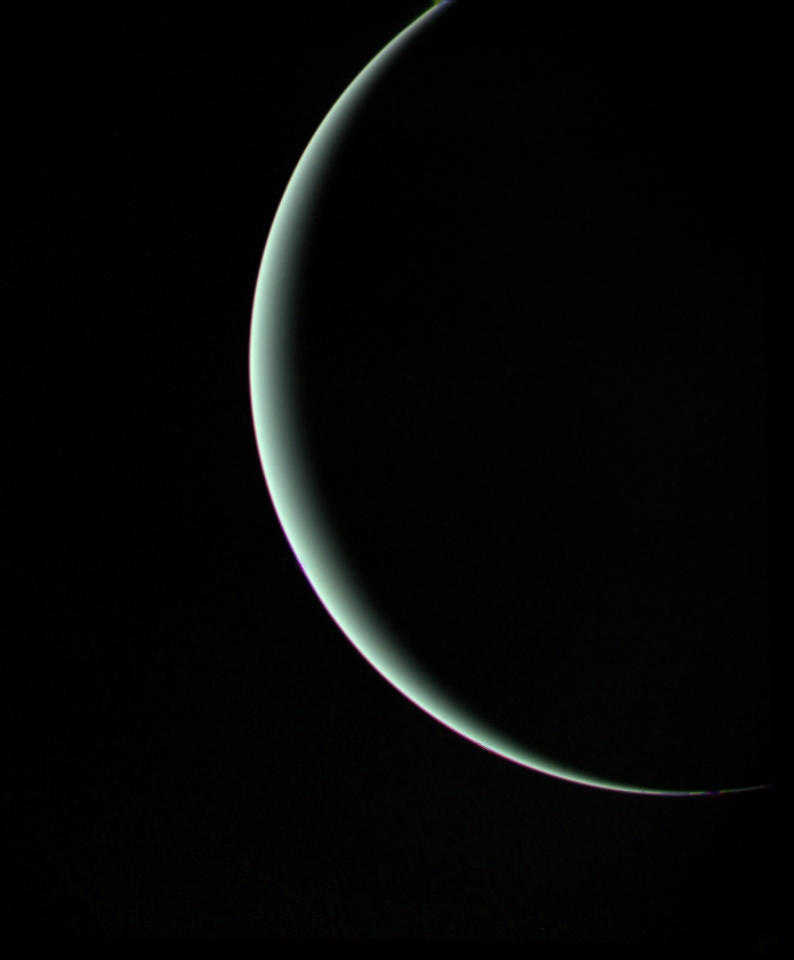
Departing image of crescent Uranus

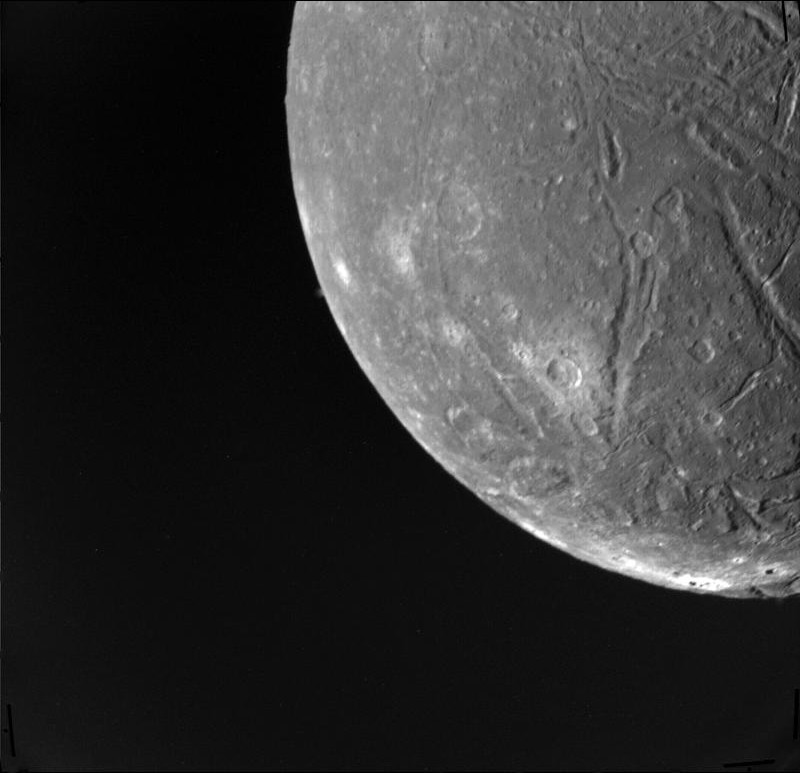
Ariel as imaged from 130,000 km

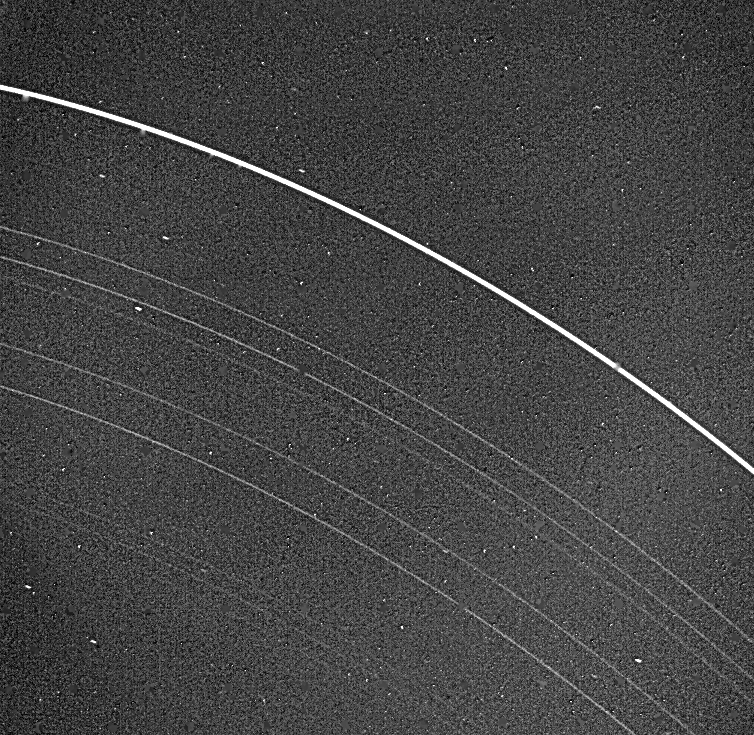
The rings of Uranus imaged by Voyager 2

=== Encounter with Neptune ===
Following a course correction in 1987, Voyager 2's closest approach to Neptune occurred on August 25, 1989. Through repeated computerized test simulations of trajectories through the Neptunian system conducted in advance, flight controllers determined the best way to route Voyager 2 through the Neptune–Triton system. Since the plane of the orbit of Triton is tilted significantly with respect to the plane of the ecliptic; through course corrections, Voyager 2 was directed into a path about 4,950 km (3,080 mi) above the north pole of Neptune. Five hours after Voyager 2 made its closest approach to Neptune, it performed a close fly-by of Triton, Neptune's largest moon, passing within about 40,000 km (25,000 mi).

In 1989, the Voyager 2 Planetary Radio Astronomy (PRA) experiment observed around 60 lightning flashes, or Neptunian electrostatic discharges emitting energies over 7×10^{8} J. A plasma wave system (PWS) detected 16 electromagnetic wave events with a frequency range of 50 Hz – 12 kHz at magnetic latitudes 7˚–33˚. These plasma wave detections were possibly triggered by lightning over 20 minutes in the ammonia clouds of the magnetosphere. During Voyager 2's closest approach to Neptune, the PWS instrument provided Neptune’s first plasma wave detections at a sample rate of 28,800 samples per second. The measured plasma densities range from 10^{–3} – 10^{–1} cm^{–3}.

Voyager 2 discovered previously unknown Neptunian rings, and confirmed six new moons: Despina, Galatea, Larissa, Proteus, Naiad and Thalassa. (Note: One of these moons, Larissa, was first reported in 1981 from ground telescope observations, but not confirmed until the Voyager 2 approach.) While in the neighborhood of Neptune, Voyager 2 discovered the "Great Dark Spot", which has since disappeared, according to observations by the Hubble Space Telescope. The Great Dark Spot was later hypothesized to be a region of clear gas, forming a window in the planet's high-altitude methane cloud deck.

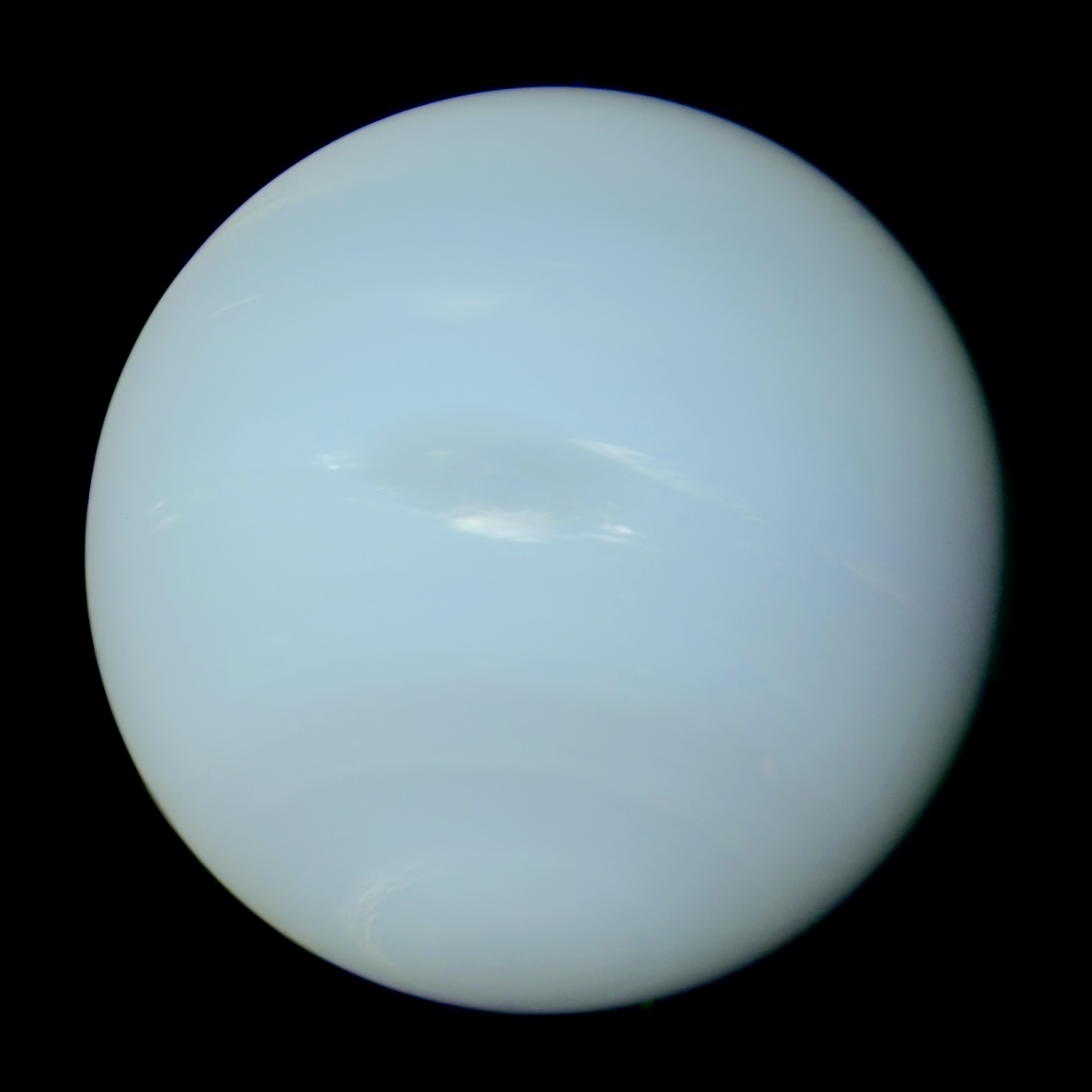
Voyager 2 image of Neptune

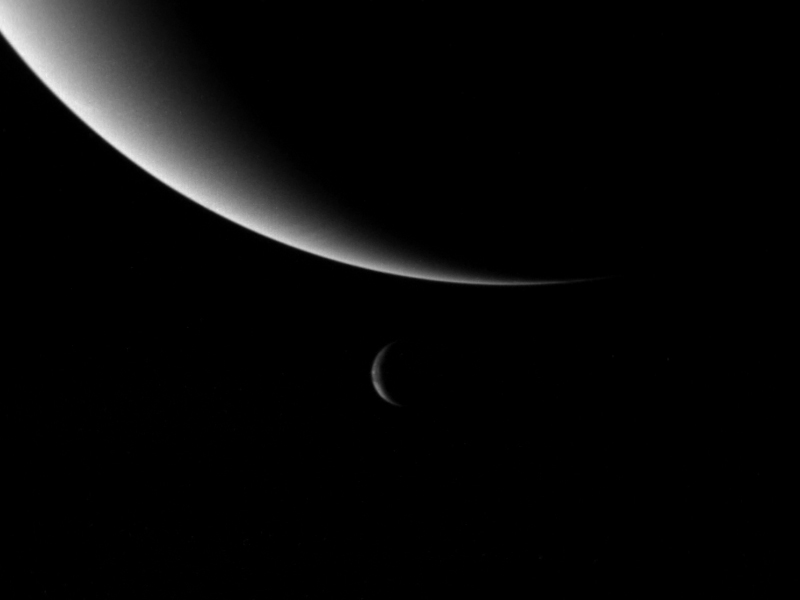
Neptune and Triton three days after Voyager 2 flyby

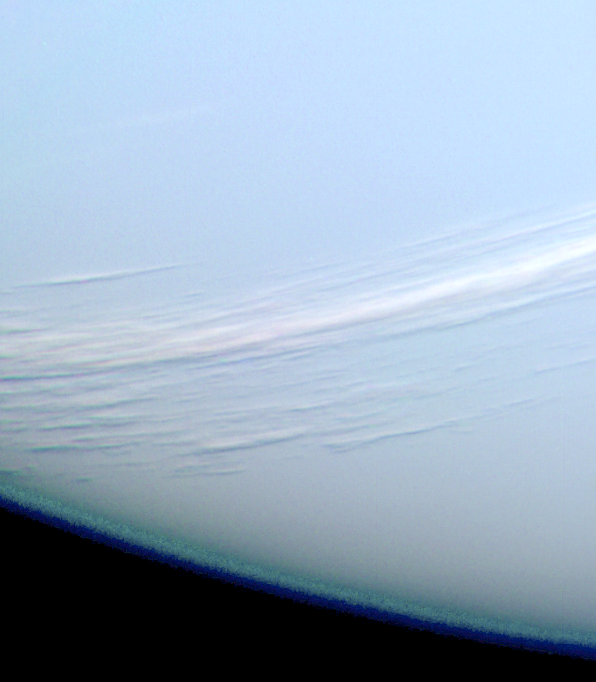
Cirrus clouds imaged above gaseous Neptune

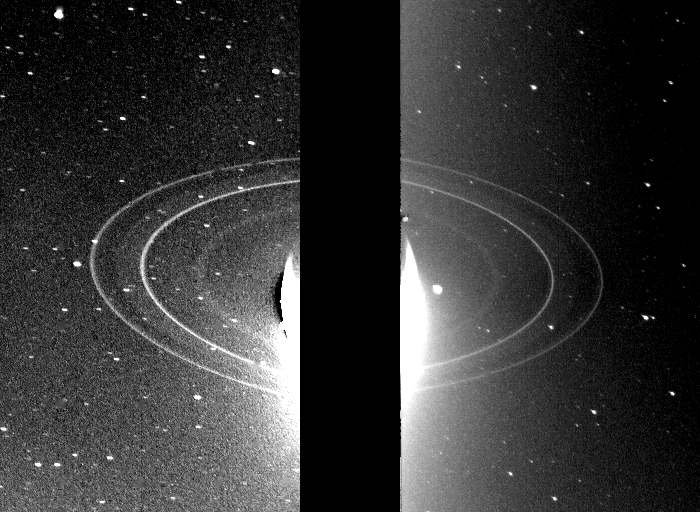
Rings of Neptune taken in occultation from 280,000 km

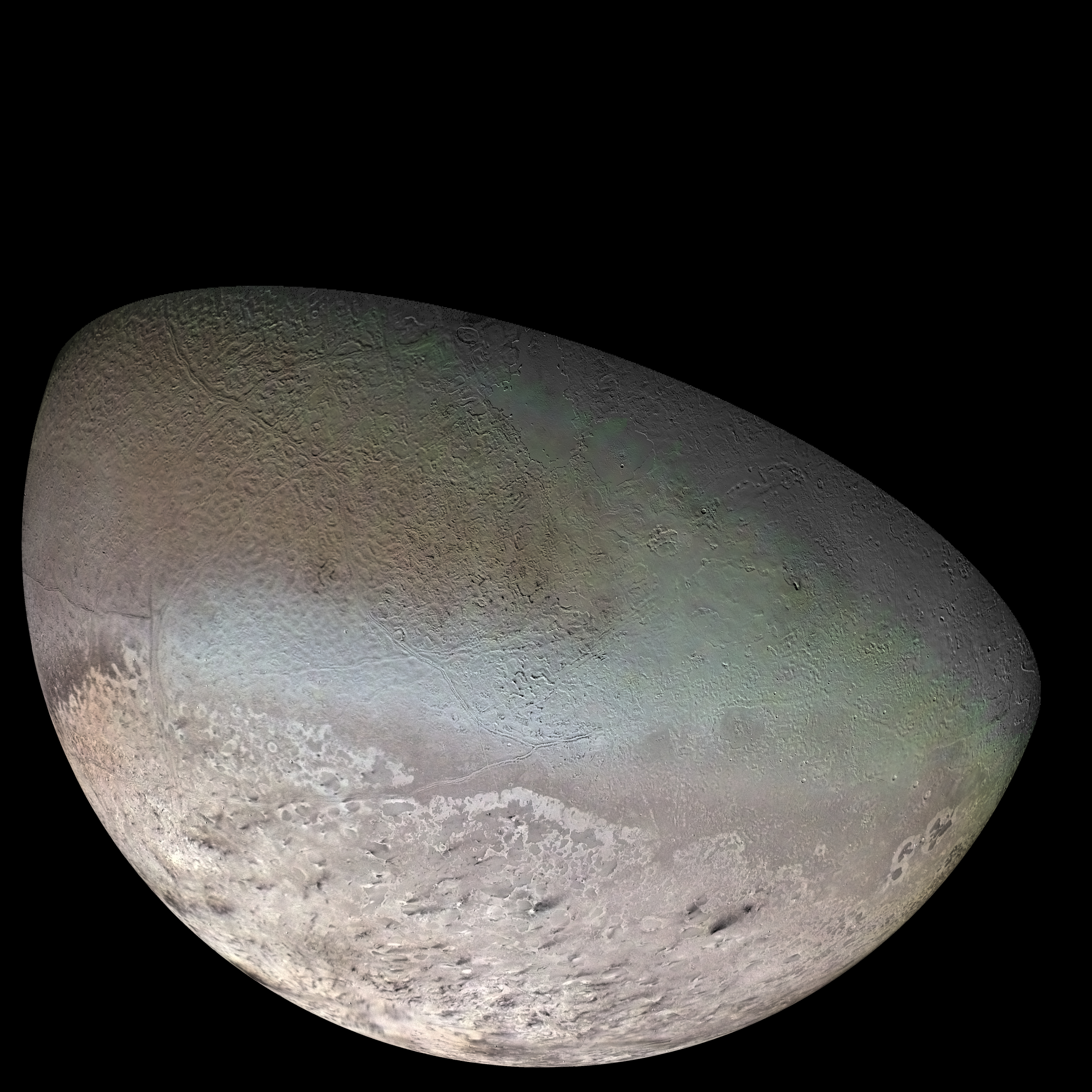
Voyager 2 color mosaic of Triton

== Interstellar mission ==
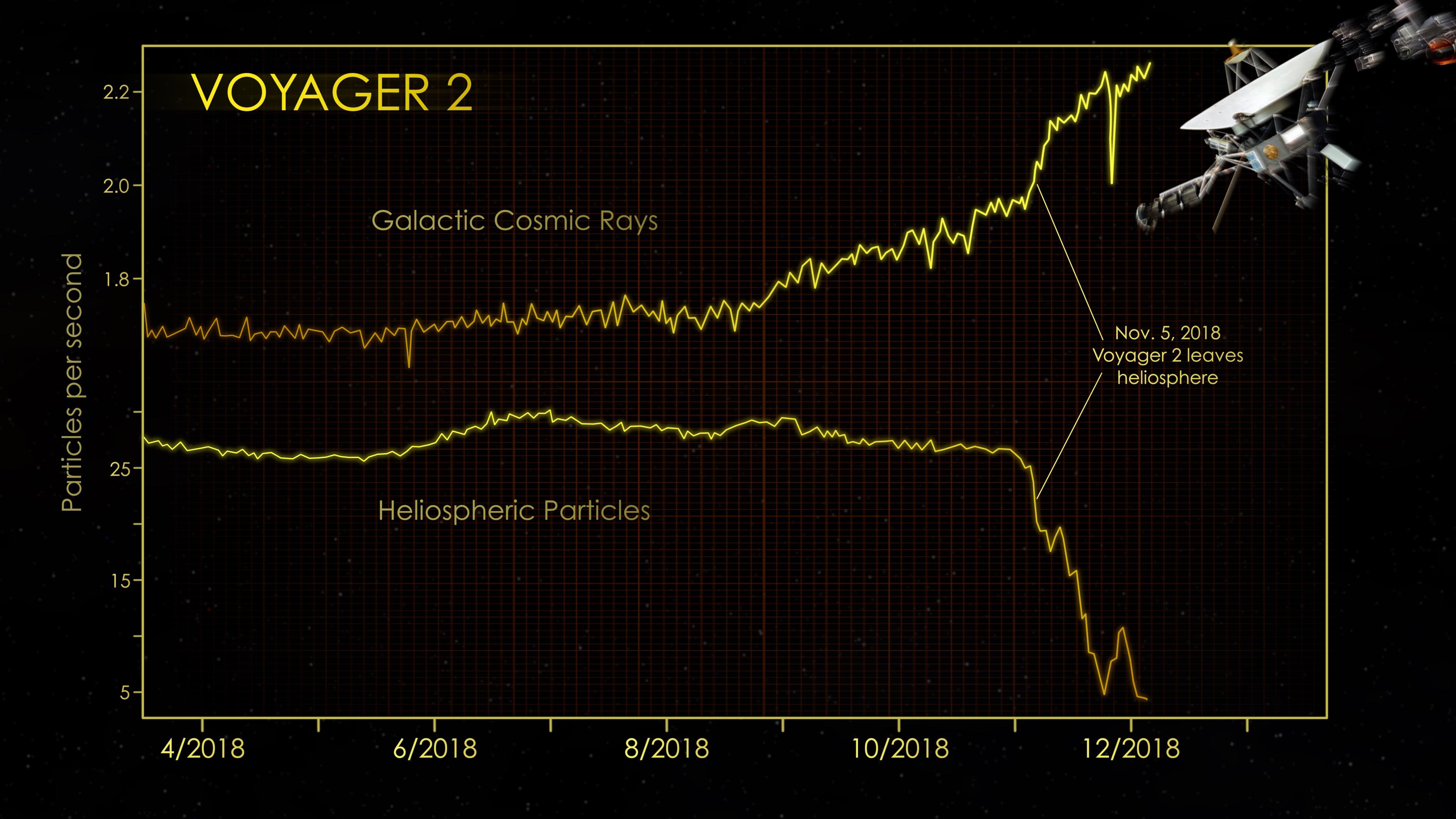
Voyager 2 left the heliosphere on November 5, 2018.

Voyager 1 and 2 speed and distance from Sun

Once its planetary mission was over, Voyager 2 was described as working on an interstellar mission, which NASA is using to find out what the Solar System is like beyond the heliosphere. As of September 2023, Voyager 2 is transmitting scientific data at about 160 bits per second. Information about telemetry exchanges with Voyager 2 is available from Voyager Weekly Reports.

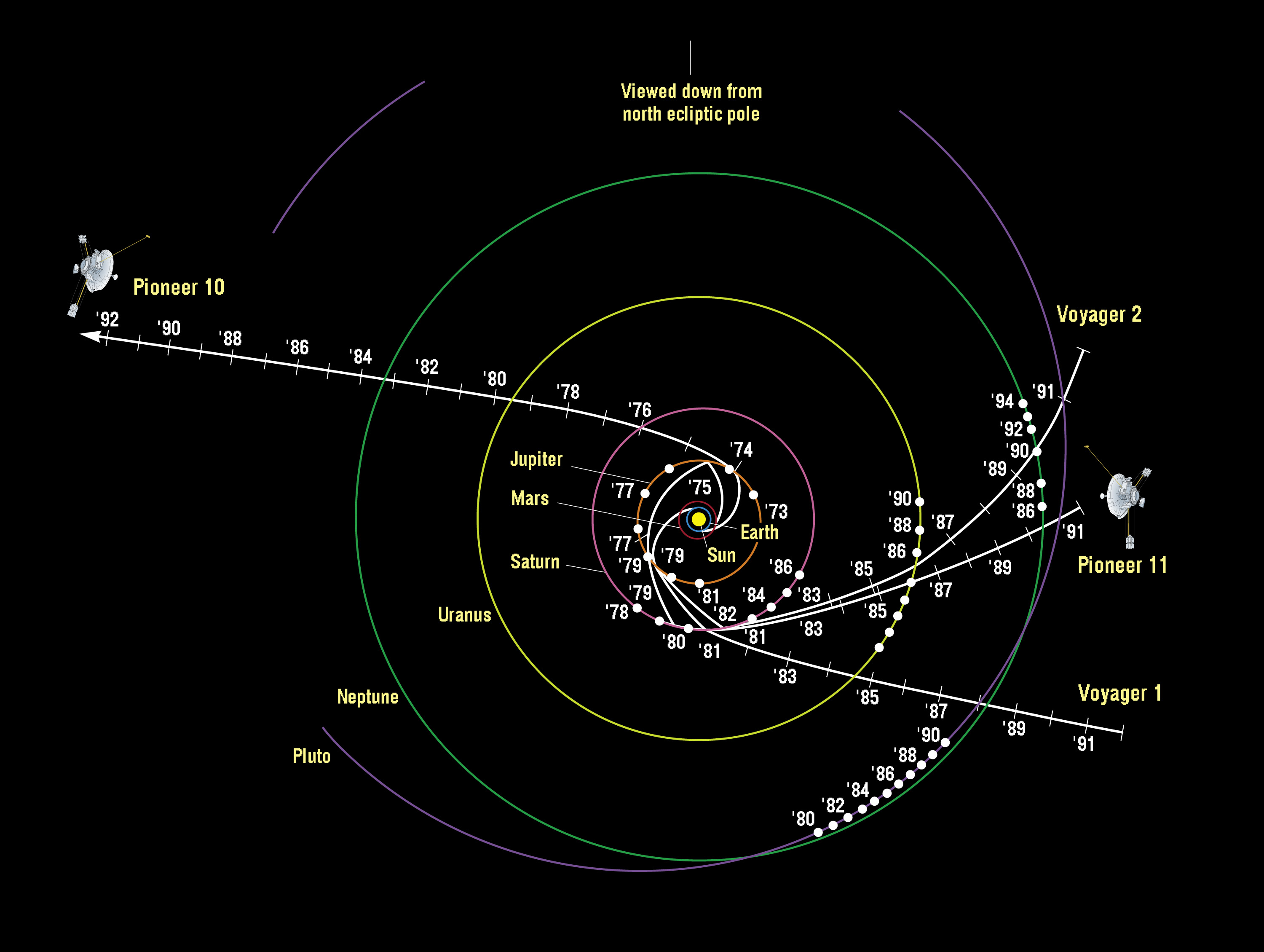
NASA map showing trajectories of the Pioneer 10, Pioneer 11, Voyager 1, and Voyager 2 spacecraft.

In 1992, Voyager 2 observed the nova V1974 Cygni in the far-ultraviolet, first of its kind. The further increase in the brightness at those wavelengths helped in the more detailed study of the nova.

In July 1994, an attempt was made to observe the impacts from fragments of Comet Shoemaker–Levy 9 with Jupiter. The craft's position meant it had a direct line of sight to the impacts and observations were made in the ultraviolet and radio spectrum. Voyager 2 failed to detect anything, with calculations showing that the fireballs were just below the craft's limit of detection.

On November 29, 2006, a telemetered command to Voyager 2 was incorrectly decoded by its computer—in a random error—as a command to turn on the electrical heaters of the spacecraft's magnetometer. These heaters stayed on until December 4, 2006, and during that time, there was a resulting high temperature above 130 °C (266 °F), significantly higher than the magnetometers were designed to endure, and a sensor rotated away from the correct orientation.

On August 30, 2007, Voyager 2 passed the termination shock and then entered into the heliosheath, approximately 1 billion mi (1.6 billion km) closer to the Sun than Voyager 1 did. This is due to the interstellar magnetic field of deep space. The southern hemisphere of the Solar System's heliosphere is being pushed in.

On April 22, 2010, Voyager 2 encountered scientific data format problems. On May 17, 2010, JPL engineers revealed that a flipped bit in a computer had caused the problem, and scheduled a bit reset for May 19. On May 23, 2010, Voyager 2 resumed sending science data from deep space after engineers fixed the flipped bit.

In 2013, it was originally thought that Voyager 2 would enter interstellar space in two to three years, with its plasma spectrometer providing the first direct measurements of the density and temperature of the interstellar plasma. Voyager project scientist Edward C. Stone and his colleagues said they lacked evidence of what would be the key signature of interstellar space, a shift in the direction of the magnetic field. Finally, in December 2018, Stone announced that Voyager 2 reached interstellar space on November 5, 2018.

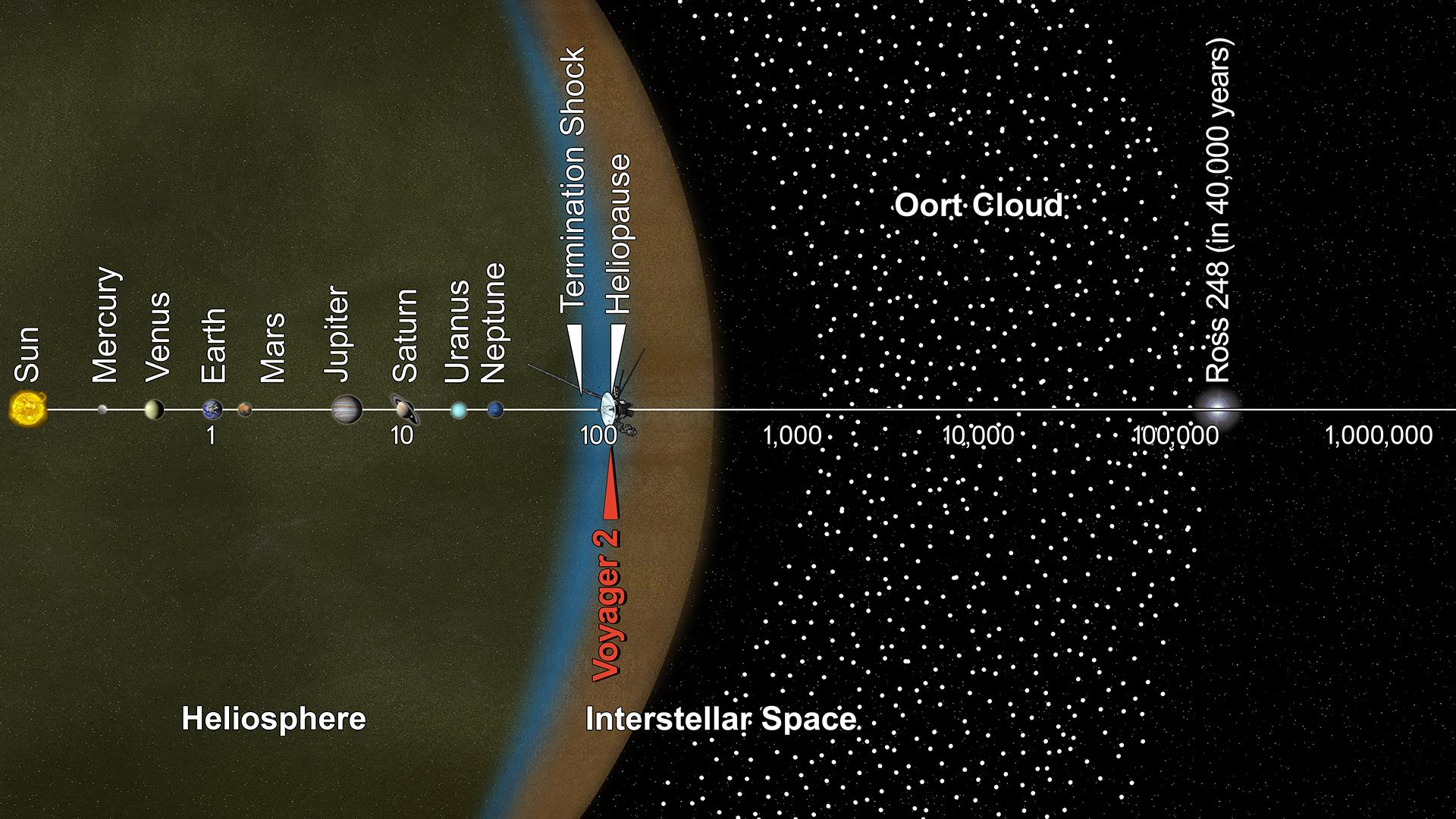
The position of Voyager 2 in December 2018. Note the vast distances condensed into a logarithmic scale: Earth is one astronomical unit (AU) from the Sun; Saturn is at 10 AU, and the heliopause is at around 120 AU. Neptune is 30.1 AU from the Sun; thus the edge of interstellar space is around four times as far from the Sun as the last planet.

Maintenance to the Deep Space Network cut outbound contact with the probe for eight months in 2020. Contact was reestablished on November 2, when a series of instructions was transmitted, subsequently executed, and relayed back with a successful communication message. On February 12, 2021, full communications were restored after a big ground station antenna upgrade that took a year to complete.

In October 2020, astronomers reported a significant unexpected increase in density in the space beyond the Solar System as detected by Voyager 1 and Voyager 2; this implies that "the density gradient is a large-scale feature of the VLISM (very local interstellar medium) in the general direction of the heliospheric nose".

On July 18, 2023, Voyager 2 overtook Pioneer 10 as the second farthest spacecraft from the Sun. On July 21, 2023, a programming error misaligned Voyager 2's high gain antenna 2 degrees away from Earth, breaking communications with the spacecraft. By August 1, the spacecraft's carrier signal was detected using antennas of the Deep Space Network. A high-power "shout" on August 4 sent from the Canberra station commanded the spacecraft to reorient towards Earth, resuming communications. As a failsafe measure, the probe is also programmed to autonomously reset its orientation to point towards Earth, which would have occurred by October 15.

== Reductions in capabilities ==
As the power from the RTG slowly reduces, various items of equipment have been turned off on the spacecraft. The first science equipment turned off on Voyager 2 was the PPS in 1991, which saved 1.2 watts.

Year	End of specific capabilities as a result of the available electrical power limitations
1998	Termination of scan platform and UVS observations
2007	Termination of Digital Tape Recorder (DTR) operations (it was no longer needed due to a failure on the High Waveform Receiver on the Plasma Wave Subsystem (PWS) on June 30, 2002)
2008	Power off Planetary Radio Astronomy Experiment (PRA)
2019	CRS heater turned off
2021	Turn off heater for Low Energy Charged Particle instrument
2023	Software update reroutes power from the voltage regulator to keep the science instruments operating
2024	Plasma Science instrument (PLS) turned off
2025	Low-Energy Charged Particles (LECP) instrument terminated
2027	Projected termination of Cosmic Ray Subsystem — projected for 2026 until it was delayed at least a year due to the "Big Bang" activity completed in August 2026
2030 approx.	Can no longer power any instrument
2036	Out of range of the Deep Space Network

=== Concerns with the orientation thrusters ===
Some thrusters needed to control the correct attitude of the spacecraft and to point its high-gain antenna in the direction of Earth are out of use due to clogging problems in their hydrazine injector. According to the Voyager project manager Suzanne Dodd, the spacecraft no longer has backups available for its thruster system and "everything onboard is running on single-string". NASA has decided to patch the computer software in order to modify the functioning of the remaining thrusters to slow the clogging of the small diameter hydrazine injector jets. Before uploading the software update on the Voyager 1 computer, NASA will first try the procedure with Voyager 2, which is closer to Earth.

In August 2026, the Voyager team performed an operation nicknamed the "Big Bang": simultaneous turning off of certain powered devices and substituting them with lower-power alternatives to extend the spacecraft's lifespan for "at least an extra year".

== Future of the probe ==
The probe is expected to provide power to keep its three instruments operating until at least the end of 2027, 50 years after it was launched. NASA says that "The Voyagers are destined—perhaps eternally—to wander the Milky Way."

Voyager 2 is not headed toward any particular star. The nearest star is 4.2 light-years away, and at 15.341 km/s, the spacecraft travels one light-year in about 19,541 years – during which time the nearby stars will also move substantially. In roughly 42,000 years, Voyager 2 will pass the star Ross 248 (10.30 light-years away from Earth) at a distance of 1.7 light-years. If undisturbed for 296,000 years, Voyager 2 should pass by the star Sirius (8.6 light-years from Earth) at a distance of 4.3 light-years.

== Golden record ==
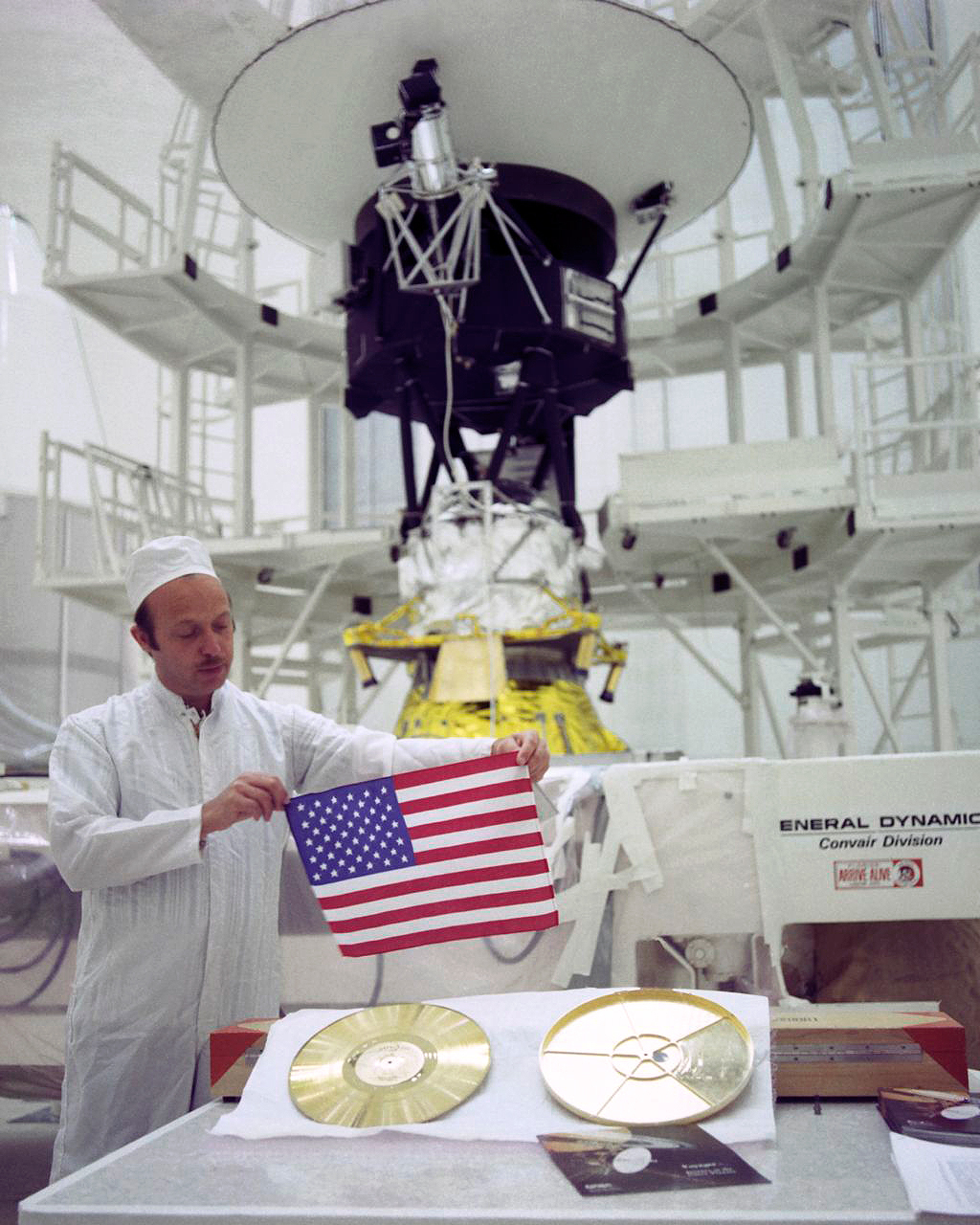
Project manager John R. Casani displaying the American flag and Golden Record, before their attachment onto Voyager 2 (in background)

Both Voyager space probes carry a gold-plated audio-visual disc in the event that either spacecraft is ever found by intelligent life-forms from other planetary systems. The discs carry photos of the Earth and its lifeforms, a range of scientific information, spoken greetings from the people (e.g. the Secretary-General of the United Nations and the President of the United States, and the children of the Planet Earth) and a medley, "Sounds of Earth", that includes the sounds of whales, a baby crying, waves breaking on a shore, and a collection of music, including works by Wolfgang Amadeus Mozart, Blind Willie Johnson, Chuck Berry's 1958 recording of "Johnny B. Goode", Valya Balkanska and other Eastern and Western classics and ethnic performers. (see also Music in space)

== See also ==
- Family Portrait
- The Farthest, a 2017 documentary on the Voyager program
- List of artificial objects leaving the Solar System
- List of missions to the outer planets
- New Horizons
- Pioneer 10
- Pioneer 11
- Timeline of artificial satellites and space probes
- Voyager 1
