= Beam waveguide antenna =

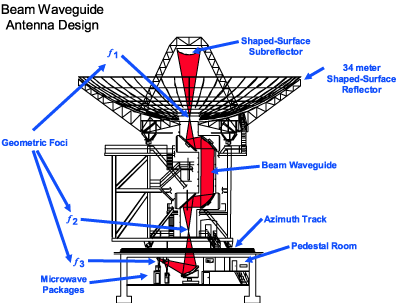
Diagram of a beam waveguide antenna from NASA, showing the signal path (red)

A beam waveguide antenna is a particular type of antenna dish, at which waveguides are used to transmit the radio beam between the large steerable dish and the equipment for reception or transmission, like e.g. RF power amplifiers.

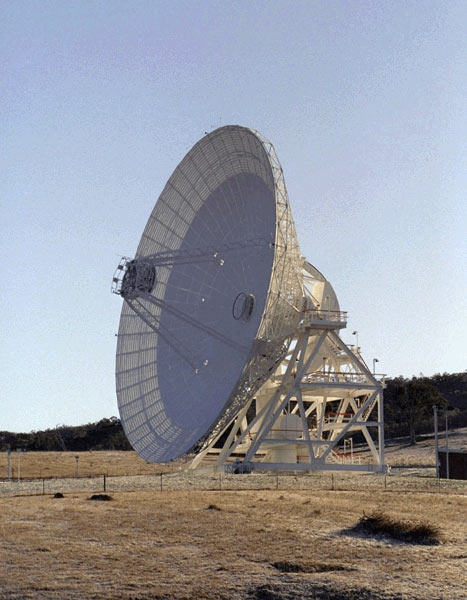
34-meter beam waveguide antenna at NASA's Deep Space Communications Complex site outside Madrid, Spain, part of the NASA Deep Space Network.

== Principle of operation ==
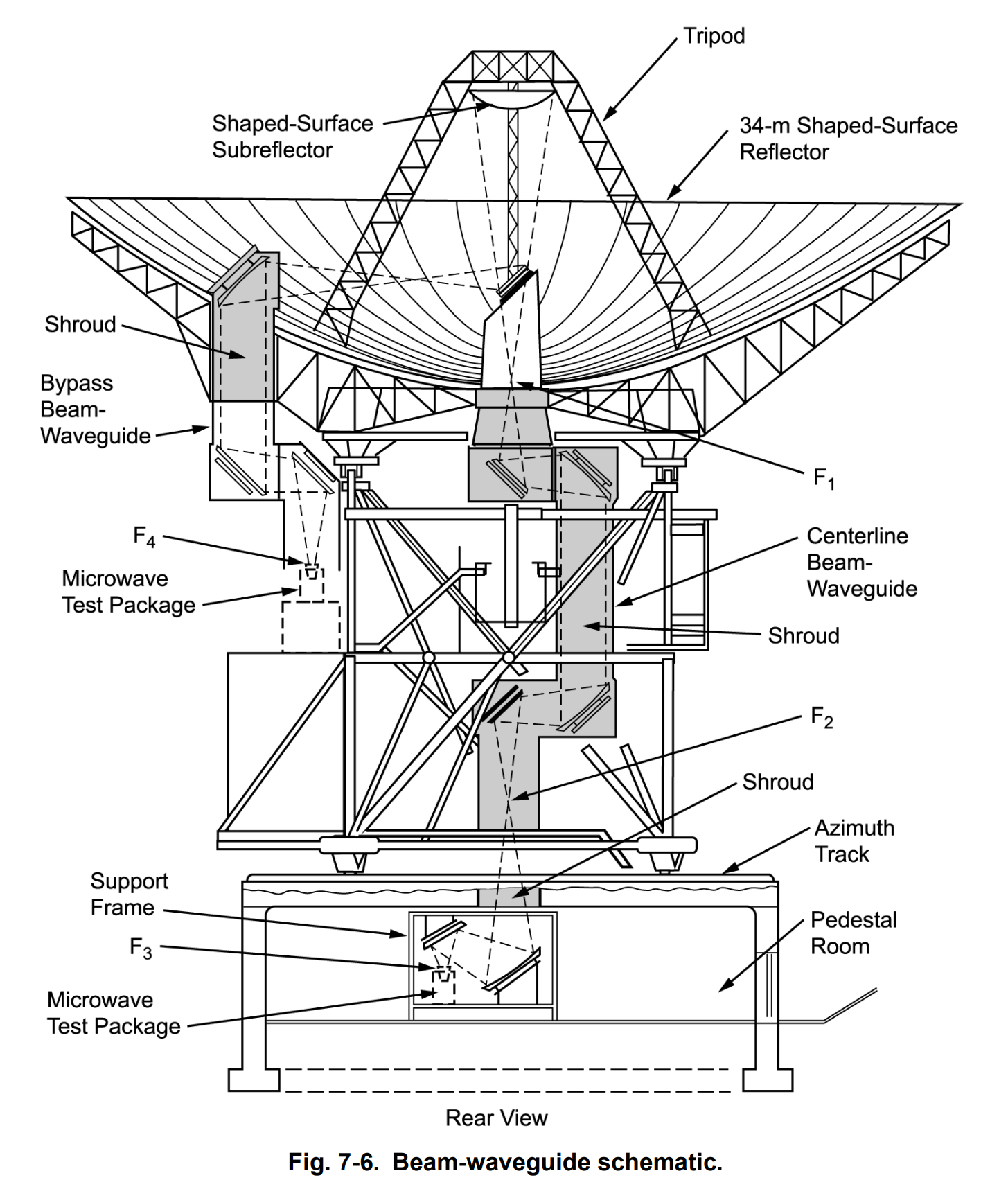
Beam Waveguide Antenna Schematic

Beam waveguide antennas are used in large radio telescopes and satellite communication stations as an alternative to the most common parabolic antenna design, the conventional "front fed" parabolic antenna. In front feed, the antenna feed, the small antenna that transmits or receives the radio waves reflected by the dish, is suspended at the focus, in front of the dish. However, this location causes a number of practical difficulties. In high performance systems, complex transmitter and receiver electronics must be located at the feed antenna. This feed equipment usually requires high maintenance; some examples are water cooling for transmitters and cryogenic cooling for sensitive receivers. With the large dishes used in these systems, the focus is high off the ground, and servicing requires cranes or scaffolds, and outdoor work with delicate equipment high off the ground. Furthermore, the feeds themselves have to be designed to handle outdoor conditions such as rain and large temperature swings, and to work while tipped at any angle.

The beam waveguide antenna addresses these problems by locating the feed antenna in a "feed house" at the base of the antenna, instead of in front of the dish. The radio waves collected by the dish are focused into a beam and reflected by metal surfaces in a path through the supporting structure to the stationary feed antenna at the base. The path is complicated because the beam must pass through both axes of the altazimuth mount of the antenna, so turning the antenna does not disturb the beam.

== History ==
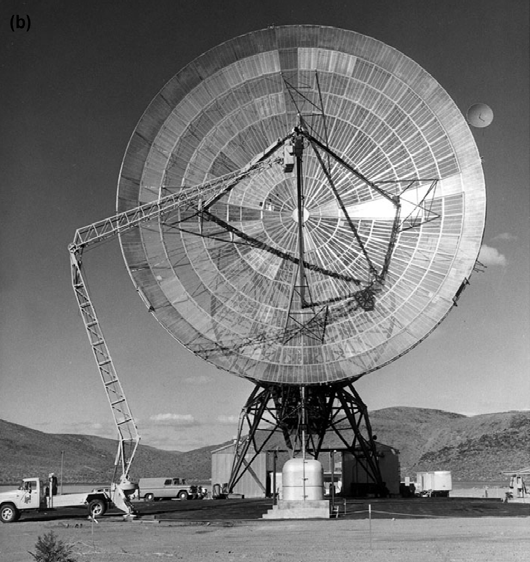
An example of one of the practical difficulties that led to the introduction of beam waveguide antennas. Here a cherry picker type truck is needed to allow workers to re-load liquid helium into a pre-amplifier mounted at the prime focus of a radio telescope.

Beam waveguides, which propagate a microwave beam using a series of reflectors, were proposed as early as 1964. By 1968, there were proposals to handle some of the signal path in pointable antennas by these techniques. By 1970, a fully beam-waveguide approach was proposed for satellite communication antennas. At first, it was believed the complicated signal path with its multiple reflecting surfaces would result in unacceptable signal loss but further analysis showed the waveguide system could be built with very low losses.

The first full scale beam waveguide antenna was the 64 meter antenna at the Usuda Deep Space Center, Japan, built in 1984 by the Japan Aerospace Exploration Agency. After the Jet Propulsion Lab (JPL) tested this antenna and found it better than their conventional 64-meter antennas, they too switched to this method of construction for all subsequent antennas of their Deep Space Network (DSN).
