= Timeline of Galileo (spacecraft) =

Trajectory of Galileo from launch to Jupiter orbital insertion

The timeline of the Galileo spacecraft spans its launch in 1989 to the conclusion of its mission when it dove into and destroyed itself in the atmosphere of Jupiter in 2003.

== Primary mission (1995–1997) ==
The trip from Earth to Jupiter, the probe's exploration of the Jovian atmosphere, and an orbiter tour consisting of 11 orbits of Jupiter constituted Galileo's primary mission.

On Jupiter Arrival Day (7 December 1995), the Galileo spacecraft was given a gravity-assist from Io and then subjected to the Jupiter orbit insertion (JOI) maneuver, which slowed the spacecraft down so that the planet could "catch" it. These two actions placed the orbiter on its proper trajectory to tour the Jovian moons. The Jupiter orbit insertion maneuver involved an orbit around the planet, which is referred to as the spacecraft's "zeroth" orbit. The spacecraft's "first," and by far longest, orbit around Jupiter followed the JOI and lasted nearly seven months. On 27 June 1996, this initial orbit culminated in a close encounter with Ganymede, the largest of the four Galilean satellites.

After the first Jupiter orbit of seven months, subsequent orbits were much shorter, ranging from one to two and a half months.

The orbiter tour included four close encounters with Ganymede, three with Europa, and three with Callisto. No Io encounters were planned for the primary mission (besides the flyby on arrival day) because mission scientists feared that the high radiation levels so close to Jupiter could damage the spacecraft and possibly end the project.

The primary mission ended in December 1997, two years after Jupiter arrival.

The Galileo mission used a two-character code to specify each orbit. The first character was the first letter of the name of the moon that would receive a flyby on the orbit, while the second character indicated the number of the orbit.

Animation of Galileo's trajectory from October 19, 1989, to September 30, 2003
Galileo · Jupiter · Earth · Venus · 951 Gaspra · 243 Ida

Animation of Galileo's trajectory around Jupiter from August 1, 1995, to September 30, 2003
Galileo · Jupiter · Io · Europa · Ganymede · Callisto

Orbit: C: Callisto; E: Europa; G: Ganymede; I: Io; J: Jovian

Orbit	Closest approach in kilometers (miles)	Date in Pacific time	Observations
Jupiter Arrival Day; I0	1,000 (600)	7 December 1995	No imaging of Io and Europa due to tape-recorder problems. Because of the high radiation levels around Io and their effect on sensitive instruments, the scientists knew that Arrival Day might be the only time they would get a detailed look at Io—the only time they could obtain high-resolution, closeup images. But concerns regarding Galileo's malfunctioning tape recorder made it necessary to cancel all remote sensing operations during the flyby. Only fields-and-particles instruments were allowed to take and record data. Remote sensing instruments such as the SSI camera required the recorder to run discontinuously, with abrupt starts and stops, and at high speeds. That kind of operation might well have permanently crippled the recorder and, with it, the entire mission.
G1	835 (519)	27 June 1996	A gravity-assist during G1 reduced Galileo's orbital period from 210 to 72 days, which allowed more orbits and close encounters each year. The perijove of orbit (point of closest approach to Jupiter) was increased to keep the spacecraft out of the most intense radiation regions. A radio-science experiment analyzed Ganymede's gravitational field and internal structure. The instruments detected evidence of a self-generated magnetosphere around the moon.
G2	260 (161)	6 September 1996	A Ganymede gravity-assist put Galileo into coplanar orbit with other Galilean satellites, permitting subsequent encounters with them. A radio-science experiment analyzed Ganymede's gravitational field and internal structure. G1 and G2 radio-science and other data revealed that Ganymede had an interior that was probably differentiated into a core and a mantle. The plasma wave experiment and magnetometer data gave evidence of an internally generated magnetic field.
C3	1,136 (705)	4 November 1996	Observations supported the theory that Callisto has a homogeneous internal structure, 60 percent rock and 40 percent ice.
E4	692 (429)	19 December 1996	Galileo's primary science objectives during E4 were to conduct remote sensing observations of Europa's surface, collect data on the moon's interactions with Jupiter's magnetosphere, and analyze Jovian atmospheric features. It included occultations of the Sun and Earth by both Jupiter and Europa, which provided an opportunity to search for indications of an ionosphere and atmosphere on the moon. The return of data from E4 was limited by a solar conjunction on 19 January 1997, occurring approximately midway between the E4 and E6 encounters.
J5	no close flyby		No close encounter to a Jovian moon was designed because Earth and Jupiter were in solar conjunction about the time that the closest approach would have occurred, and there would have been minimal communication capability between the spacecraft and Earth.
E6	586 (363)	20 February 1997	The main scientific objective was to conduct high-resolution coverage of Europa. This was a similar objective to E4, but with some new Europa surface terrain observed. Monitoring of Io was also conducted. Jupiter atmospheric observations during E4 involved a coordinated effort by all of the Orbiter's remote sensing instruments to analyze white oval features in the infrared and ultraviolet regions of the spectrum. Four occultations of Earth occurred during E6—two by Europa, one by Io, and one by Jupiter. The radio science occultation measurements made during these events provided data on atmospheric profiles of the moons and Jupiter, and also on Europa's gravitational field.
G7	3,102 (1,926)	5 April 1997	The spacecraft flew over the high latitudes of Ganymede and took high-resolution observations of high-energy impact regions, as well as Jupiter magnetosphere and aurora observations.
G8	1,603 (995)	7 May 1997	The spacecraft passed over the midlatitudes of Ganymede, with closest approach longitudes 180° apart from those of the G7 encounter, allowing new terrain to be imaged.
C9	418 (260)	25 June 1997	The spacecraft passed through and studied the magnetotail region of the Jovian magnetosphere during the period between the C9 and C10 flybys. Analysis of the C3, C9, and C10 data suggests that Callisto may have a subsurface, salty ocean that is responsible for a variable magnetic field induced by Jupiter's field.
C10	539 (335)	17 September 1997	C10 data suggest that the internal structure of the moon is not homogeneous, but partially differentiated, with a higher percentage of rock than ice having settled toward the center of the satellite. Callisto is probably less differentiated than the other Galilean moons.
E11	2,042 (1,266)	6 November 1997	The encounter included the longest recording to date, lasting almost 3 hours, of Jovian magnetospheric data close to Europa. The data were helpful not only in the study of Europa, but also for analyzing Io's plasma torus, whose charged particles are strongly influenced by the magnetic fields they encounter. Primary science objectives of E11 included more remote sensing of the moon's surface and more Jovian atmospheric observations. Another objective was to obtain the highest resolution images yet taken of four small, inner Jovian satellites: Thebe, Metis, Amalthea, and Adrastea.

== Galileo Europa Mission (1997–1999) ==
The Galileo project would have been considered a success even if the spacecraft had stayed operational only through the end of the primary mission on 7 December 1997, two years after Jupiter arrival. The orbiter was an extremely robust machine, however, with many backup systems. It showed no sign of quitting at the end of the primary mission, so it was given a highly focused set of new exploration objectives, defined in part by the findings of the primary mission. As some of these new objectives centered on investigating Europa in great detail, the new mission was appropriately called the "Galileo Europa Mission" (GEM). Mission objectives were not limited to Europa, however; they included analyses of other satellites, as well as of Jovian fields and particles and atmospheric characteristics. During GEM, some of the most important and spectacular observations of the volcanic moon Io were taken.

GEM ran for slightly over two years, from 8 December 1997 to 31 December 1999. It was a low-cost mission with a budget of only $30 million. At the end of the primary mission, most of the 200 Galileo staff members left for other assignments. The remaining bare-bones crew, about one-fifth the size of the primary mission, was left to run GEM and achieve the objectives of four separate studies:

- Europa campaign.
- Io campaign.
- Io plasma torus study.
- Jupiter water study.

On each flyby, the spacecraft took only two days of data versus the seven days it had taken during the primary mission. Minimal Jovian magnetic field data were collected. The GEM team did not include the expertise to deal with unexpected problems, as the primary mission had. When issues arose, specialists who had gone on to other missions were temporarily brought back and placed on "tiger teams" to work through the problems quickly.

Orbit	Closest approach in kilometers (miles)	Date in Pacific time	Observations
E12	196 (122)	16 December 1997	The instruments observed the Conamara ice raft region and took stereo images of the Pwyll crater region. Stereo imaging discerned the topography of a region.
E13	3,562 (2,212)	10 February 1998	No remote sensing or magnetospheric data were collected because of the solar conjunction, which reduced the capacity to transmit science data to Earth. Radio science data for studying Europan gravitational field and internal structure were taken.
E14	1,645 (1,022)	29 March 1998	Stereo imaging of Mannann'an crater and Tyre Macula dark spot was accomplished. The spacecraft observed banded terrain, bright plains, and ice rafts.
E15	2,515 (1,562)	31 May 1998	The spacecraft carried out stereo and color imaging of Cilix massif, previously believed to be the largest mountain on Europa (but E15 data revealed that it was an impact crater). Created near-terminator maps of unexplored mottled terrain. (The terminator is the boundary between the part of the moon that is illuminated and that which is dark.) Because of the low Sun angles near the terminator, shadows cast by uneven terrain are more measurable, and the heights of mounds, ridges and ice rafts can be determined.
E16	1,830 (1,136)	21 July 1998	A spacecraft safing event prevented Europan science observations. The cause of the event was believed to be electrostatic discharges in the slip rings between the spun and despun sections of the Orbiter. The spacecraft passed over the Europan south pole.
E17	3,582 (2,224)	26 September 1998	A south polar pass (like that of E16) allowed observations of many of the targets missed during E16. The spacecraft searched for evidence of large-scale shifting of surface features, which would indicate a possible liquid sublayer. The spacecraft's instruments took images of the Agenor Linea-Thrace Macula region, Libya Linea, a strike-slip fault zone, Rhiannon Crater, Thynia Linea, and south polar terrain (for comparison with E4 and E6 equatorial terrain images). Thermal maps of Europa were generated. Radioscience analyses of the Europan gravity field were made over a 20-hour period. The instruments also made ultraviolet observations of Europa outgassing and atmospheric emissions.
E18	2,273 (1,412)	22 November 1998	A safing event terminated science observations 6 hours before the Europan closest approach. The primary collection was of radio-science Doppler data.
E19	1,439 (894)	1 February 1999	The instruments carried out global- and regional-scale mapping, along with imaging of Tegid Crater, Rhadmanthys Linea volcanic features, mottled terrain, and a dark spot. The ultraviolet instruments also made observations of atmospheric emissions and possible outgassing. A safing event terminated science observations 4 hours after the Europan closest approach. Outbound distant observations of Europa (as well as Jupiter and Io) were lost.
C20	1,315 (817)	5 May 1999	The perijove reduction campaign began; it involved incremental changes in the closest approach to Jupiter carried out over four Callisto encounters (C20–C23). The campaign was designed to set up flybys of Io, the Galilean moon closest to Jupiter.
C21	1,047 (650)	30 June 1999	NIMS studied the trailing edge of Callisto. The SSI camera observed dark surface material. The PPR studied equatorial region.
C22	2,296 (1,426)	14 August 1999	The spacecraft observed Callisto's ionosphere and measured the distribution of free electrons.
C23	1,057 (656)	16 September 1999	The spacecraft observed Callisto's ionosphere, measured the distribution of free electrons, and completed the perijove reduction campaign.
I24	611 (379)	11 October 1999	Spacecraft safed at 19 hours before Io encounter due to radiation memory hit. The Galileo engineering staff succeeded to get the spacecraft fully operational by 8 P.M. Pacific Time, a mere 2 hours before the closest approach. Obtained valuable imaging of Io volcanism. Observed a 10-kilometer-long eruption of Pele volcano.
I25	300 (186)	25 November 1999	Spacecraft safed at 4 hours before encounter due to software problem. With very little time, the Galileo team had to formulate command sequences and get them to Jupiter. The spacecraft recovered only three minutes before the closest encounter with Io. Collected dramatic pictures of Io volcanic activity. Observed mile-high lava fountain.

== Galileo Millennium Mission (2000–2003) ==
Because the orbiter was continuing to operate well, a further extension to the original project, the Galileo Millennium Mission (GMM), was added to pursue answers to key questions raised during GEM. The original GMM schedule ran from January 2000 through March 2001, but it was then extended to the end of mission operations in January 2003.

The spacecraft met its demise in September 2003, when its trajectory took it on a collision course toward Jupiter and it burned up in the planet's atmosphere.

GMM conducted additional investigations of Europa, including a magnetic field measurement key to detecting the presence of liquid water. GMM also added to our knowledge of Io, studied the dynamics of Ganymede's unique magnetosphere, determined particle sizes in Jupiter's rings, and performed a joint investigation with the Cassini spacecraft, whose closest approach to Jupiter was on 30 December 2000.

Some of Galileo's instruments were not operating at full performance during GMM because exposure to Jupiter's intense radiation belts had damaged them. This was not surprising; the total radiation that the spacecraft had received was three times the amount that its systems had been built to withstand. But even with its impaired systems, Galileo continued to make valuable observations and generate important scientific data.

Orbit	Closest approach in kilometers (miles)	Date in Pacific time	Observations
E26	351 (218)	3 January 2000	Only limited observations were made during E26 due to factors such as the decreasing periods of Galileo orbits (allowing less time to develop orbital sequences), a smaller workforce and budget than during GEM, and reduced downlink resources. Recorded observations during E26 included high-resolution pictures near the Europan terminator, images of three of the four Jovian inner moons (Thebe, Amalthea, and Metis), and observations of the Loki volcanic region on Io. The E26 flyby was also designed to better characterize Europa's magnetic field signature to determine whether the moon generated its own magnetic field or had an induced field whose characteristics were affected by Europa's location within Jupiter's magnetosphere.
I27	198 (123)	22 February 2000	Discovered volcanoes that change from hot to cool in several weeks. After flyby the spacecraft safed due to transient bus reset. Some Io 27 data played back during Ganymede 28.
G28	1,000 (600)	20 May 2000	Galileo's closest approach to Ganymede coincided with Cassini's. Joint Galileo-Cassini observations revealed solar wind effects and magnetospheric dynamics. High-resolution Ganymede images also were taken. Magnetometer data suggest that a salty water layer exists beneath the icy crust.
-	-	15 June 2000 to 15 November 2000	Magnetosphere–solar wind interaction measurements.
G29	2,321 (1,441)	28 December 2000	Real-time data were transmitted as Galileo flew from the inner magnetosphere through the magnetopause and bow shock and into the solar wind. Remote sensing instruments targeted Jupiter, its rings, and the Galilean satellites.
C30	138 (86)	25 May 2001	The spacecraft observed the Asgard, Valhalla, and Bran craters in the closest flyby to date (in order to set up an Io encounter in August 2001). Camera problems were possibly due to continued radiation exposure that affected distant images taken of Io. Problems were corrected before the closest approach to Callisto.
I31	200 (120)	5 August 2001	Magnetic measurements of Io indicated a weak or absent internally generated field. Spacecraft directly sampled fresh sulfur dioxide "snowfakes" from a volcanic vent.
I32	181 (112)	16 October 2001	Galileo observed the Loki volcano (largest in the Solar System) and a new eruption in the southern region of the moon.
I33	102 (63)	17 January 2002	This was the closest of all the flybys of Io. The moon provided a gravity-assist necessary for Galileo's ultimate collision course with Jupiter. A safing event 28 minutes before closest approach prevented most of the planned data from being collected. Galileo 's cameras were deactivated, after they had sustained irreparable radiation damage.
Amalthea 34	160 (99)	4 November 2002	Scientists used data from Amalthea encounter in order to better determine the mass and density profile of Amalthea. Combined with previously determined shape and volume information, observations generated a bulk density estimate near 1 gram per cubic centimeter, considerably lower than had been envisioned from the moon's dark albedo and its expected rocky composition. About 10 minutes after the closest approach of the Amalthea flyby, Galileo stopped collecting data, shut down all of its instruments, and went into safe mode. Though most of the Amalthea data was already written to tape, it was found that the recorder refused to play back the data collected. After weeks of troubleshooting, the flight team concluded that the problem was not stuck tape, as had happened when Galileo was first approaching Jupiter in 1995, but was instead the result of radiation damage of one or more of the instrument's infrared light-emitting diodes (LEDs). The damage was believed to consist of the displacement of atoms in the LEDs' crystal lattices, which degraded the LED optical output to only 20 percent of its full power. Laboratory experiments suggested that for the tape recorder to run properly, the LED output had to be at least 50 percent. The Galileo flight team conducted an exhaustive analysis of possible ways to work around the problem and developed a strategy that might partially repair the damaged lattices. JPL would send commands to the spacecraft to initiate electric currents passing through the LEDs. The strategy did not immediately fix the LEDs, but after multiple applications of electric current, LED optical output increased to 60 percent, allowing the tape recorder to begin running again and download its stored data. After about 100 hours of annealing and playback cycles, the recorder was able to operate for up to an hour at a time. After many subsequent playback and cooling cycles, the complete transmission back to Earth of all recorded Amalthea flyby data was successful.
Jupiter 35	(impact)	21 September 2003	Galileo's final orbit took it on an elongated loop away from Jupiter, from which it returned on 21 September 2003 to plow into the parent planet's 60,000-kilometer-thick atmosphere. This demise was planned in order to avoid any chance that the spacecraft might strike and contaminate the moon Europa, where scientists believe that simple life-forms may exist. If such life-forms are discovered in future missions, scientists must be sure that they are not Earth organisms that were accidentally carried to Europa aboard Galileo.
