= Gaea (crater) =

Impact crater on Amalthea

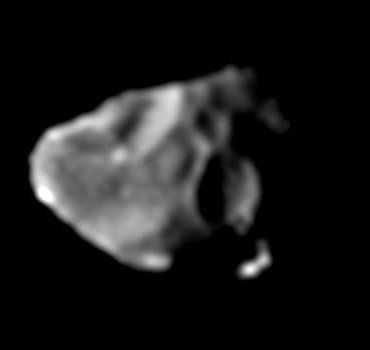
- Galileo image of Amalthea, with Gaea near the bottom.
- Feature type: Impact crater
- Coordinates: 80.0°S 90.0°W
- Diameter: 75.0 km (46.6 mi)
- Depth: >10–20 km (6.2–12.4 mi)
- Eponym: Gaia

Gaea is an impact crater on Amalthea, one of the small moons of Jupiter. It is 75 km wide and at least 10–20 km deep. Its center coordinates are -80°S, 90°W. One of two named craters on Amalthea (the other being Pan), it is named after the Greek goddess Gaia.

One third of Gaea's interior is covered by a bright spot, the largest on Amalthea. Its brightness is at least 2.3 times greater than the area outside the crater. It is about 25 km wide and appears to extend beyond the crater.

Gaea is near Amalthea's south pole, far south from the moon's other bright areas, Lyctos Facula and Ida Facula, which are on the slopes of a prominent mountain elongated along the meridian.

== See also ==
- Greek mythology
