= Zethus (crater) =

Large crater on Thebe

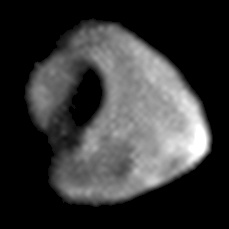
- Galileo image of Thebe showing Zethus (the largest crater in the image)
- Location: Thebe
- Diameter: 40 km (25 mi)
- Eponym: Zethus

Zethus /ˈziːθəs/ is a large crater on Jupiter's moon Thebe. The crater is named after Zethus, the husband of the nymph Thebe in Greek mythology, and is the only named surface feature on Thebe. It measures 40 km (25 mi) across in diameter, making quite large when compared to Thebe itself. Zethus, like many other craters on Thebe and Amalthea has bright spots located near its rim. Zethus never faces Jupiter due to being tidally locked to Jupiter in a way that Thebe's long axis points towards Jupiter.
