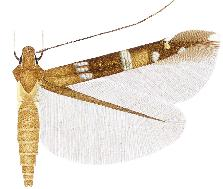

Scientific classification
- Kingdom: Animalia
- Phylum: Arthropoda
- Clade: Pancrustacea
- Class: Insecta
- Order: Lepidoptera
- Family: Cosmopterigidae
- Genus: Cosmopterix
- Species: C. metis

Binomial name
- Cosmopterix metis Koster, 2010

= Cosmopterix metis =

Species of moth

Cosmopterix metis is a moth of the family Cosmopterigidae. It is known from the Federal District of Brazil.

Adults have been recorded in July.

== Description ==
Male. Forewing length 3.7 mm. Head: frons shining grey, in middle a shining white streak, vertex and neck tufts shining bronze brown with some reddish reflection, laterally lined white, collar shining bronze brown; labial palpus first segment very short, white, second segment three-quarters of the length of third, dark brown with white longitudinal lines laterally and ventrally, third segment white, lined brown laterally, extreme apex white; scape dorsally dark brown with a white anterior line, ventrally white, antenna shining dark brown with a white interrupted line from base to two-fifths with a short uninterrupted section at base, two indistinct subapical greyish rings of two segments each, separated by two dark brown segments at three-quarters, apical part of eighteen segments greyish brown. Thorax and tegulae shining bronze brown with reddish gloss. Legs: shining dark brown, femur of hindleg shining golden, foreleg with a white line on tibia and tarsal segments one and two, segment four with a white apical ring, segment five entirely white, tibia of midleg with silvery white oblique basal and medial lines and a white apical ring, tarsal segments one, two and four with white apical rings, segment five dorsally white, tibia of hindleg with a silvery metallic basal streak, silvery metallic medial and subapical rings, and a white apical ring, tarsal segments one to three with white apical rings and segment four and five entirely white, spurs dark brown, apically lighter. Forewing with basal one-sixth shining bronze brown with reddish gloss, remaining part shining dark brown with reddish gloss, at one-fifth three short silver metallic streaks with bluish reflection, a subcostal, a medial just above fold and slightly further from base than the subcostal and a subdorsal, slightly further from base than the medial, a tubercular silver metallic fascia with greenish and purplish reflections in the middle, perpendicular on dorsum and with a large square bronze brown spot on dorsum on the outside, at two-thirds a tubercular silver metallic dorsal spot with bluish reflection, at three-quarters a tubercular pale golden costal spot, smaller than the dorsal spot, edged by a narrow white costal streak, apical line as a short silver metallic streak with bluish reflection in the middle of the apical area and a broad white spot in the cilia at apex, cilia dark brown, paler on dorsum towards base. Hindwing shining dark greyish brown, cilia dark brown. Underside: forewing shining dark greyish brown with the white costal streak and apical spot distinctly visible, hindwing greyish brown. Abdomen dorsally shining pale ochreous-brown with reddish gloss, laterally with golden and greenish reflections, ventrally shining dark brown, segments broadly banded shining white posteriorly, anal tuft greyish brown.

== Etymology ==
The species is named after Metis, a moon of Jupiter. To be treated as a noun in apposition.
