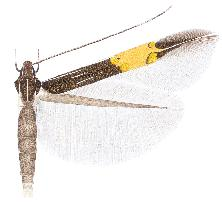

Scientific classification
- Kingdom: Animalia
- Phylum: Arthropoda
- Clade: Pancrustacea
- Class: Insecta
- Order: Lepidoptera
- Family: Cosmopterigidae
- Genus: Cosmopterix
- Species: C. thebe

Binomial name
- Cosmopterix thebe Koster, 2010

= Cosmopterix thebe =

Species of moth

Cosmopterix thebe is a moth of the family Cosmopterigidae. It is known from Loreto Province, Peru.

Adults have been recorded in March.

== Description ==
Male, female. Forewing length 3.4-3.8. Head: frons shining greyish white, vertex shining dark brown, laterally lined white, collar shining dark brown; labial palpus first segment very short, greyish white, second segment four-fifths of the length of third, dark brown with white longitudinal lines laterally and ventrally, third segment white, lined dark brown laterally, extreme apex white; scape dorsally shining dark brown with a white anterior line, ventrally shining white, antenna shining dark brown, with a white line from base to three-fifths, distal part interrupted, followed towards apex by five white segments, one dark brown, two white, ten dark brown and eight white segments at apex. Thorax shining dark brown with a white median line, tegulae shining dark brown, lined white inwardly. Legs: shining dark brown, femora of midleg and hindleg shining ochreous-grey, foreleg with a white line on tibia and tarsal segments, tibia of midleg with white oblique basal and medial lines and a white apical ring, tarsal segments one, two, four and five with white longitudinal lines, tibia of hindleg as midleg, tarsal segment one with white basal and apical rings, tarsal segments two and three with white longitudinal lines, segments four and five entirely white, spurs white dorsally, brown ventrally. Forewing shining dark brown, five narrow white lines in the basal area, a costal from one-quarter to the transverse fascia, a subcostal from base to one-quarter and slightly bending from costa, a medial from one-fifth to just beyond the subcostal, a subdorsal starting slightly further from base than the medial to two-fifths, often interrupted in distal part, a dorsal from one-tenth to one-quarter, a bright yellow-orange transverse fascia beyond the middle, narrowing towards dorsum and with an apical protrusion, bordered at the inner edge by two tubercular golden metallic subcostal and dorsal spots the subcostal with a patch of blackish scales on the outside, and the dorsal spot further from base than the subcostal, bordered at the outer edge by two tubercular golden metallic costal and dorsal spots, the dorsal spot three times as large as the costal, both spots inwardly lined dark brown, a white costal streak outward of the outer costal spot, a narrow shining white apical line from the apical protrusion to apex, cilia dark brown. Hindwing shining dark greyish brown, cilia dark brown. Underside: forewing shining dark greyish brown with a yellowish white costal streak in the apical half, hindwing shining dark greyish brown. Abdomen dorsally dark greyish brown with greenish and reddish reflections, segments six and seven banded lighter posteriorly, ventrally shining yellowish white, anal tuft ochreous-white, in the female the anal tuft is dorsally dark brown, ventrally whitish.

== Etymology ==
The species is named after Thebe, a moon of Jupiter. To be treated as a noun in apposition.
