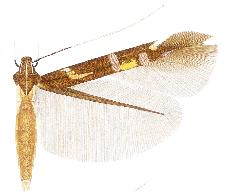

Scientific classification
- Kingdom: Animalia
- Phylum: Arthropoda
- Clade: Pancrustacea
- Class: Insecta
- Order: Lepidoptera
- Family: Cosmopterigidae
- Genus: Cosmopterix
- Species: C. adrastea

Binomial name
- Cosmopterix adrastea Koster, 2010

= Cosmopterix adrastea =

Species of moth from Cuba

Cosmopterix adrastea is a moth of the family Cosmopterigidae. It is known from Cuba.

Adults were collected in June.

== Description ==
Male. Forewing length 3.6–3.8 mm. Head: frons shining greyish white with greenish and reddish reflections, vertex and neck tufts shining dark bronze brown with greenish and reddish reflections, laterally and medially lined white, collar shining dark bronze brown with greenish and reddish reflections; labial palpus first segment very short, white, second segment three-quarters of the length of third, dark brown with white longitudinal lines laterally and ventrally, third segment white, lined brown laterally; scape dorsally dark brown with a white anterior line, ventrally white; antenna shining dark brown, an interrupted white line from base to beyond one-half, followed towards apex by approximately 18 dark brown segments, three to four white and about fifteen dark brown segments at apex. Thorax and tegulae shining dark brown with reddish gloss, thorax with a white median line. Legs: shining dark brown, femora shining greyish brown, foreleg with a white line on tibia and tarsal segments one, two, four and five, tibiae of midleg and hindleg with a silver metallic longitudinal line from base to one-third, tibia of midleg with a white medial spot and apical ring, tibia of hindleg as midleg but with an additional broad white subapical ring, tarsal segment one of midleg with a thin white longitudinal line and white dorsal spots on segments one, two, four and five, hindleg with a white dorsal spot on tarsal segments one to three, segment four with apical half and segment five entirely white, spurs dark brown with a tiny white spot. Forewing shining dark brown, the basal area slightly paler, at one-fifth a very irregular inwardly oblique pale golden metallic fascia, not reaching costa and dorsum, at costal side with a white spot, this fascia can have a distal extension on the dorsal side, a broad tubercular silver metallic fascia at or just beyond the middle, slightly inwardly oblique to perpendicular at dorsum and with strong purplish reflection, on dorsum at three-fifths, a tubercular silver metallic spot with purplish reflection, dorsal half of wing between the fascia and the dorsal spot pale yellow, sometimes not reaching the dorsal spot, this pale yellow patch varies in size, a tubercular silver metallic subcostal spot at three-quarters, outwardly edged by a narrow white costal streak, a short silver metallic apical line with strong bluish and purplish reflections in the middle of the apical area and a shining white spot in the cilia at apex, cilia dark brown, paler on dorsum towards base. Hindwing shining greyish brown, cilia greyish brown. Underside: forewing shining greyish brown with orange gloss and with the white costal streak and apical line distinctly visible, hindwing greyish brown, a short whitish streak on dorsum at base. Abdomen dorsally yellowish brown with reddish reflection, ventrally shining dark brown with reddish reflection, segments very broadly banded shining white posteriorly, especially mid-ventrally, anal tuft brownish grey.

== Etymology ==
Named after Adrastea, a moon of Jupiter. To be treated as a noun in apposition.
