= Rings of Jupiter =

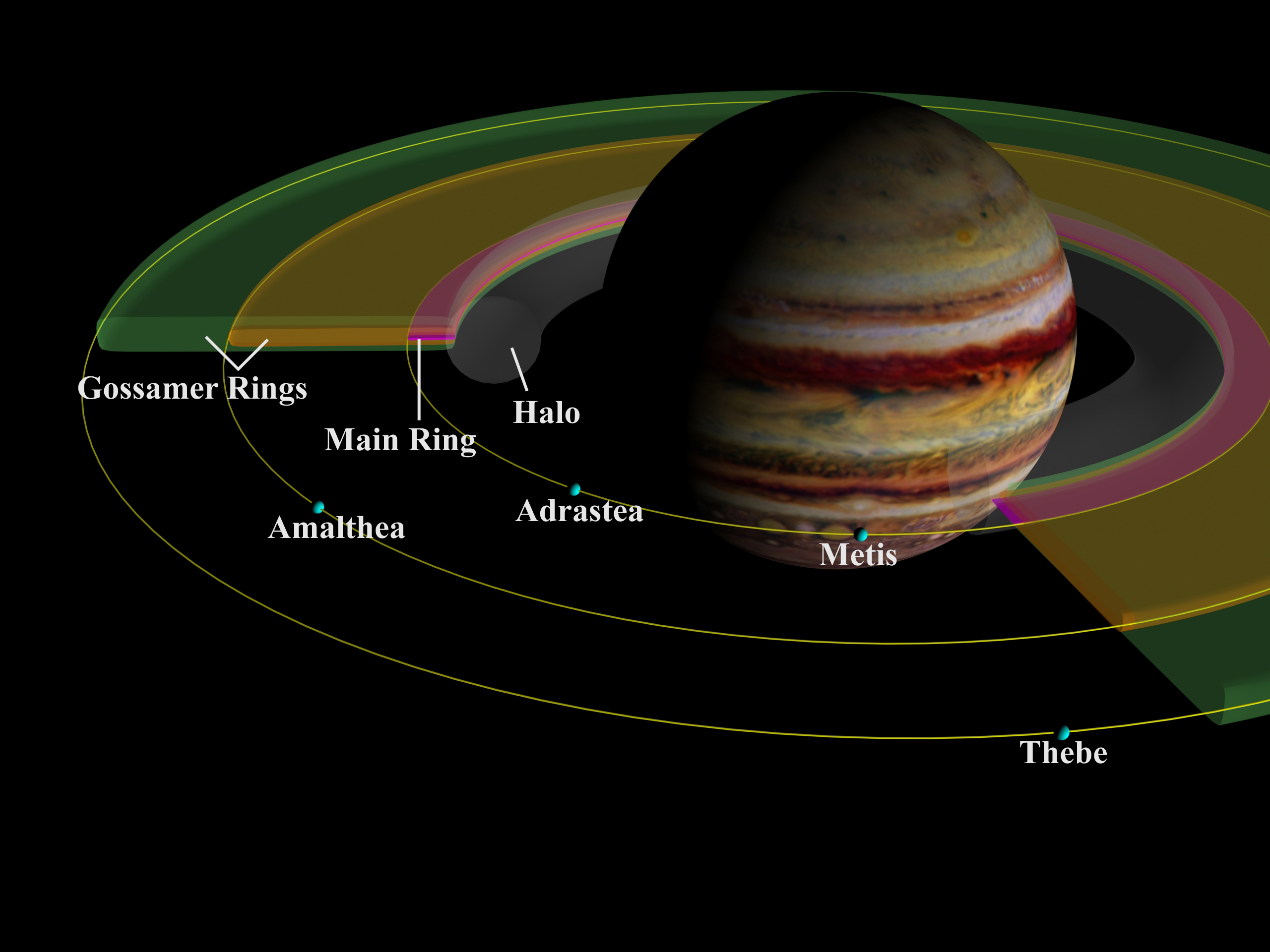
A schema of Jupiter's ring system showing the four main components. For simplicity, Metis and Adrastea are depicted as sharing their orbit. (In reality, Metis is very slightly closer to Jupiter.)

The rings of Jupiter are a system of faint planetary rings. The Jovian rings were the third ring system to be discovered in the Solar System, after those of Saturn and Uranus. The main ring was discovered in 1979 by the Voyager 1 space probe and the system was more thoroughly investigated in the 1990s by the Galileo orbiter. The main ring has also been observed by the Hubble Space Telescope and from Earth for several years. Ground-based observation of the rings requires the largest available telescopes.

The Jovian ring system is faint and consists mainly of dust. It has four main components: a thick inner torus of particles known as the "halo ring"; a relatively bright, exceptionally thin "main ring"; and two wide, thick and faint outer "gossamer rings", named for the moons of whose material they are composed: Amalthea and Thebe.

The main and halo rings consist of dust ejected from the moons Metis, Adrastea and perhaps smaller, unobserved bodies as the result of high-velocity impacts. High-resolution images obtained in February and March 2007 by the New Horizons spacecraft revealed a rich fine structure in the main ring.

In visible and near-infrared light, the rings have a reddish color, except the halo ring, which is neutral or blue in color. The size of the dust in the rings varies, but the cross-sectional area is greatest for nonspherical particles of radius about 15 μm in all rings except the halo. The halo ring is probably dominated by submicrometre dust. The total mass of the ring system (including unresolved parent bodies) is poorly constrained, but is probably in the range of 10^{11} to 10^{16} kg. The age of the ring system is also not known, but it is possible that it has existed since the formation of Jupiter.

A ring or ring arc appears to exist close to the moon Himalia's orbit. One explanation is that a small moon recently crashed into Himalia and the force of the impact ejected the material that forms the ring.

== Discovery and structure ==
Jupiter's ring system was the third to be discovered in the Solar System, after those of Saturn and Uranus. It was first observed on 4 March 1979 by the Voyager 1 space probe. It is composed of four main components: a thick inner torus of particles known as the "halo ring"; a relatively bright, exceptionally thin "main ring"; and two wide, thick and faint outer "gossamer rings", named after the moons of whose material they are composed: Amalthea and Thebe. The principal attributes of the known Jovian Rings are listed in the table.

In 2022, dynamical simulations suggested that the relative meagreness of Jupiter's ring system, compared to that of the smaller Saturn, is due to destabilising resonances created by the Galilean satellites.

| Name | Radius (km) | Width (km) | Thickness (km) | Optical depth (Note: The normal optical depth is the ratio between the total cross section of the ring's particles to the square area of the ring.) (in τ) | Dust fraction | Mass, kg | Notes |
|---|---|---|---|---|---|---|---|
| Halo ring | 92,000–122,500 | 30,500 | 12,500 | ~1 × 10^{−6} | 100% | — | |
| Main ring | 122,500–129,000 | 6,500 | 30–300 | 5.9 × 10^{−6} | ~25% | 10^{7}– 10^{9} (dust); 10^{11}– 10^{16} (large particles) | Bounded by Adrastea |
| Amalthea gossamer ring | 129,000–182,000 | 53,000 | 2,000 | ~1 × 10^{−7} | 100% | 10^{7}– 10^{9} | Connected with Amalthea |
| Thebe gossamer ring | 129,000–226,000 | 97,000 | 8,400 | ~3 × 10^{−8} | 100% | 10^{7}– 10^{9} | Connected with Thebe. There is an extension beyond the orbit of Thebe. |

== Main ring ==
=== Appearance and structure ===
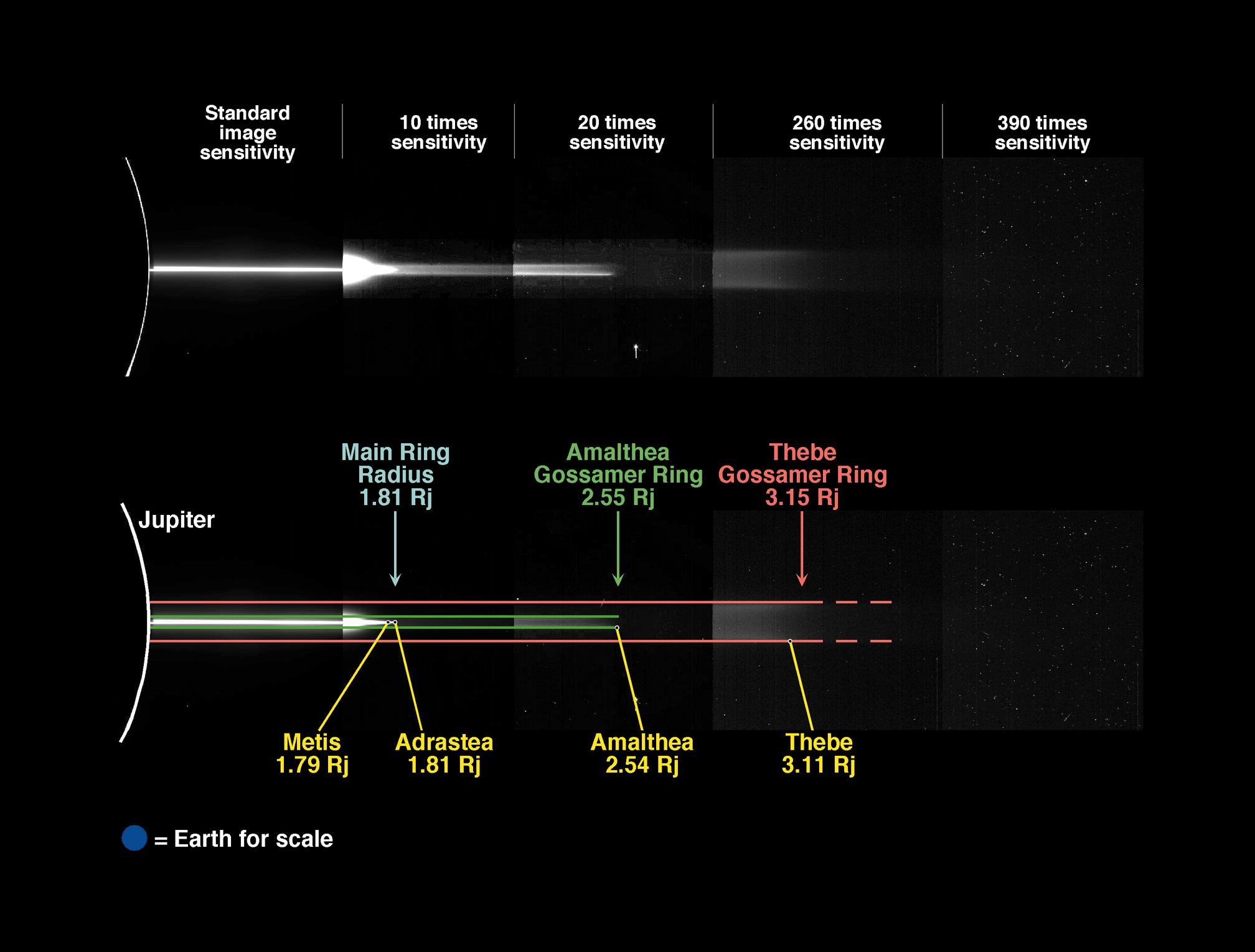
Mosaic of Jovian ring images with a scheme showing ring and satellite locations

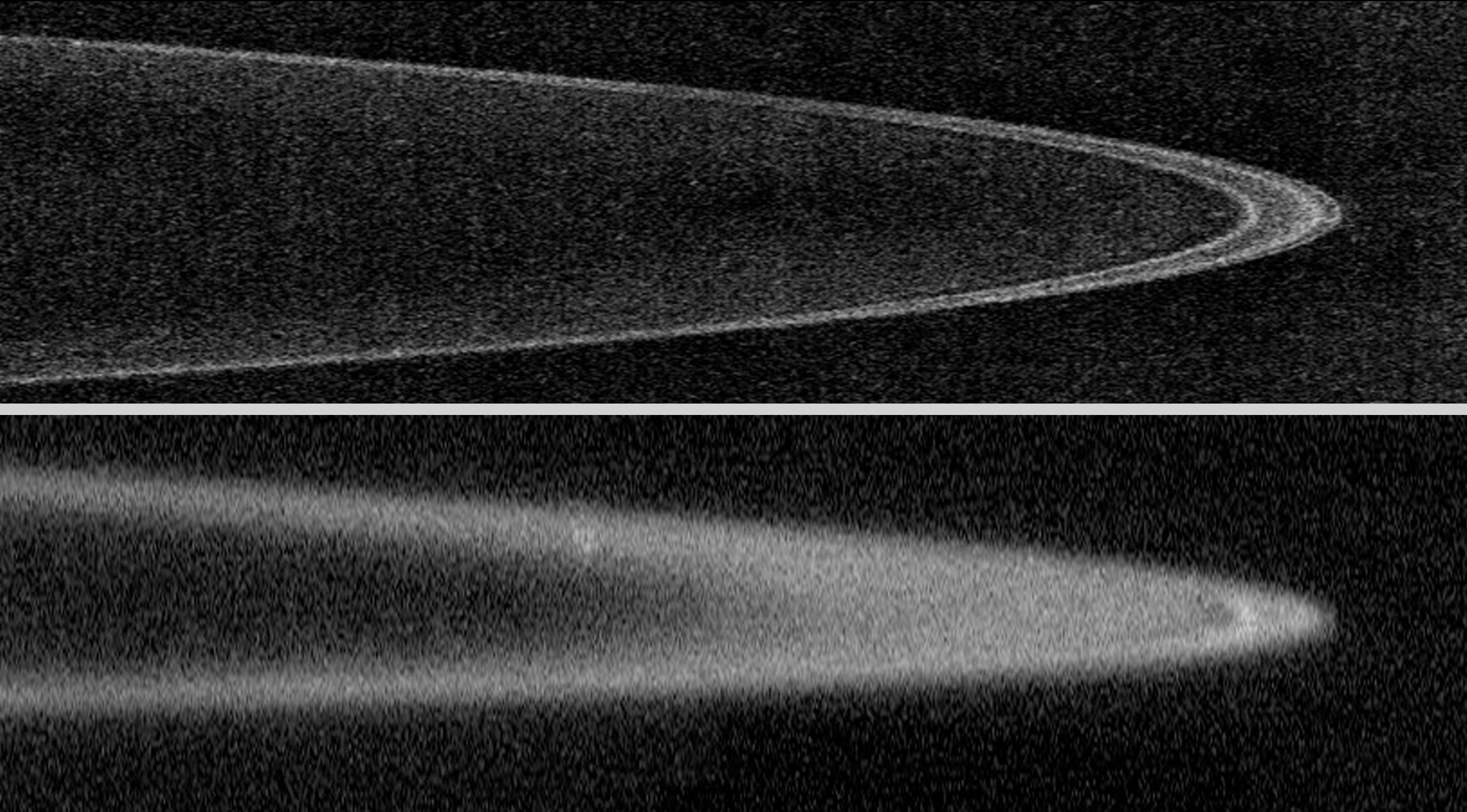
The upper image shows the main ring in back-scattered light as seen by the New Horizons spacecraft. The fine structure of its outer part is visible. The lower image shows the main ring in forward-scattered light demonstrating its lack of any structure except the Metis notch.

Metis orbiting at the edge of Jupiter's main ring, as imaged by the New Horizons spacecraft in 2007

The narrow and relatively thin main ring is the brightest part of Jupiter's ring system. Its outer edge is located at a radius of about 129,000 km (1.806 R_{J};R_{J} = equatorial radius of Jupiter or 71,398 km) and coincides with the orbit of Jupiter's smallest inner satellite, Adrastea. Its inner edge is not marked by any satellite and is located at about 122,500 km (1.72 R_{J}).

Thus the width of the main ring is around 6,500 km. The appearance of the main ring depends on the viewing geometry. In forward-scattered light (Note: The forward-scattered light is the light scattered at a small angle relative to solar light.) the brightness of the main ring begins to decrease steeply at 128,600 km (just inward of the Adrastean orbit) and reaches the background level at 129,300 km—just outward of the Adrastean orbit. Therefore, Adrastea at 129,000 km clearly shepherds the ring. The brightness continues to increase in the direction of Jupiter and has a maximum near the ring's center at 126,000 km, although there is a pronounced gap (notch) near the Metidian orbit at 128,000 km. The inner boundary of the main ring, in contrast, appears to fade off slowly from 124,000 to 120,000 km, merging into the halo ring. In forward-scattered light all Jovian rings are especially bright.

In back-scattered light (Note: The back-scattered light is the light scattered at an angle close to 180° relative to solar light.) the situation is different. The outer boundary of the main ring, located at 129,100 km, or slightly beyond the orbit of Adrastea, is very steep. The orbit of the moon is marked by a gap in the ring so there is a thin ringlet just outside its orbit. There is another ringlet just inside Adrastean orbit followed by a gap of unknown origin located at about 128,500 km. The third ringlet is found inward of the central gap, outside the orbit of Metis. The ring's brightness drops sharply just outward of the Metidian orbit, forming the Metis notch. Inward of the orbit of Metis, the brightness of the ring rises much less than in forward-scattered light. So in the back-scattered geometry the main ring appears to consist of two different parts: a narrow outer part extending from 128,000 to 129,000 km, which itself includes three narrow ringlets separated by notches, and a fainter inner part from 122,500 to 128,000 km, which lacks any visible structure like in the forward-scattering geometry. The Metis notch serves as their boundary. The fine structure of the main ring was discovered in data from the Galileo orbiter and is clearly visible in back-scattered images obtained from New Horizons in February–March 2007. The early observations by Hubble Space Telescope (HST), Keck and the Cassini spacecraft failed to detect it, probably due to insufficient spatial resolution. However the fine structure was observed by the Keck telescope using adaptive optics in 2002–2003.

Observed in back-scattered light the main ring appears to be razor thin, extending in the vertical direction no more than 30 km. In the side scatter geometry the ring thickness is 80–160 km, increasing somewhat in the direction of Jupiter. The ring appears to be much thicker in the forward-scattered light—about 300 km. One of the discoveries of the Galileo orbiter was the bloom of the main ring—a faint, relatively thick (about 600 km) cloud of material which surrounds its inner part. The bloom grows in thickness towards the inner boundary of the main ring, where it transitions into the halo.

Detailed analysis of the Galileo images revealed longitudinal variations of the main ring's brightness unconnected with the viewing geometry. The Galileo images also showed some patchiness in the ring on the scales 500–1000 km.

In February–March 2007 New Horizons spacecraft conducted a deep search for new small moons inside the main ring. While no satellites larger than 0.5 km were found, the cameras of the spacecraft detected seven small clumps of ring particles. They orbit just inside the orbit of Adrastea inside a dense ringlet. The conclusion, that they are clumps and not small moons, is based on their azimuthally extended appearance. They subtend 0.1–0.3° along the ring, which correspond to 1,000–3,000 km. The clumps are divided into two groups of five and two members, respectively. The nature of the clumps is not clear, but their orbits are close to 115:116 and 114:115 resonances with Metis. They may be wavelike structures excited by this interaction.

=== Spectra and particle size distribution ===
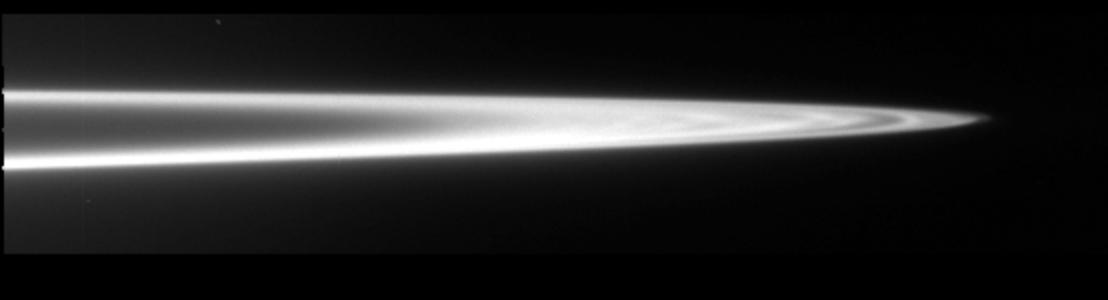
Image of the main ring obtained by Galileo in forward-scattered light. The Metis notch is clearly visible.

Spectra of the main ring obtained by the HST, Keck, Galileo and Cassini have shown that particles forming it are red, i.e. their albedo is higher at longer wavelengths. The existing spectra span the range 0.5–2.5 μm. No spectral features have been found so far which can be attributed to particular chemical compounds, although the Cassini observations yielded evidence for absorption bands near 0.8 μm and 2.2 μm. The spectra of the main ring are very similar to Adrastea and Amalthea.

The properties of the main ring can be explained by the hypothesis that it contains significant amounts of dust with 0.1–10 μm particle sizes. This explains the stronger forward-scattering of light as compared to back-scattering. However, larger bodies are required to explain the strong back-scattering and fine structure in the bright outer part of the main ring.

Analysis of available phase and spectral data leads to a conclusion that the size distribution of small particles in the main ring obeys a power law

$$n(r)=A\times r^{-q}$$

where n(r) dr is a number of particles with radii between r and r + dr and $A$ is a normalizing parameter chosen to match the known total light flux from the ring. The parameter q is 2.0 ± 0.2 for particles with r < 15 ± 0.3 μm and q = 5 ± 1 for those with r > 15 ± 0.3 μm. The distribution of large bodies in the mm–km size range is undetermined presently. The light scattering in this model is dominated by particles with r around 15 μm.

The power law mentioned above allows estimation of the optical depth $\scriptstyle\tau$ of the main ring: $\scriptstyle\tau_l\,=\,4.7\times 10^{-6}$ for the large bodies and $\scriptstyle \tau_s = 1.3\times 10^{-6}$ for the dust. This optical depth means that the total cross section of all particles inside the ring is about 5000 km^{2}. (Note: It should be compared with approximately 1700 km² total cross section of Metis and Adrastea.) The particles in the main ring are expected to have aspherical shapes. The total mass of the dust is estimated to be 10^{7}−10^{9} kg. The mass of large bodies, excluding Metis and Adrastea, is 10^{11}−10^{16} kg. It depends on their maximum size— the upper value corresponds to about 1 km maximum diameter. These masses can be compared with masses of Adrastea, which is about 2 × 10^{15} kg, Amalthea, about 2 × 10^{18} kg, and Earth's Moon, 7.4 × 10^{22} kg.

The presence of two populations of particles in the main ring explains why its appearance depends on the viewing geometry. The dust scatters light preferably in the forward direction and forms a relatively thick homogenous ring bounded by the orbit of Adrastea. In contrast, large particles, which scatter in the back direction, are confined in a number of ringlets between the Metidian and Adrastean orbits.

=== Origin and age ===
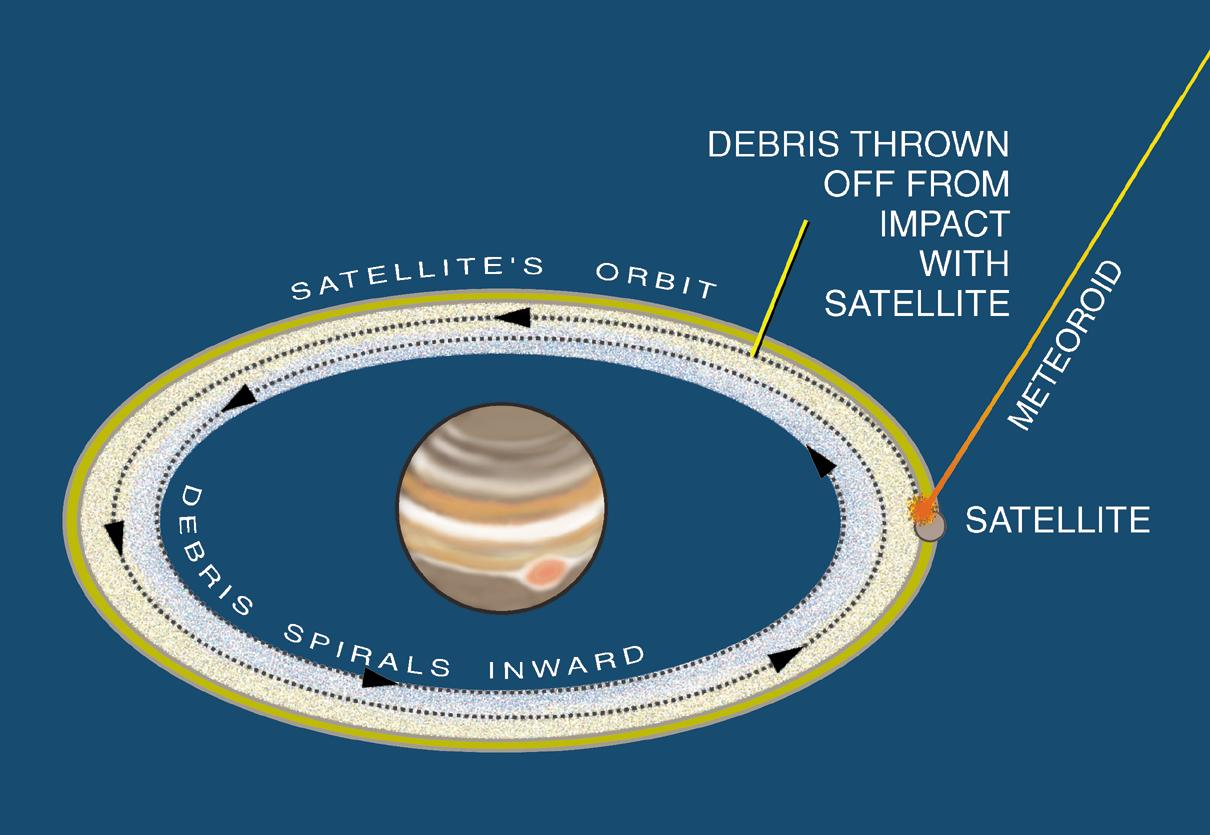
Schematic illustrating the formation of Jupiter's rings

The dust is constantly being removed from the main ring by a combination of Poynting–Robertson drag and electromagnetic forces from the Jovian magnetosphere. Volatile materials such as ices, for example, evaporate quickly. The lifetime of dust particles in the ring is from 100 to 1,000 years, so the dust must be continuously replenished in the collisions between large bodies with sizes from 1 cm to 0.5 km and between the same large bodies and high velocity particles coming from outside the Jovian system. This parent body population is confined to the narrow—about 1,000 km—and bright outer part of the main ring, and includes Metis and Adrastea. The largest parent bodies must be less than 0.5 km in size. The upper limit on their size was obtained by New Horizons spacecraft. The previous upper limit, obtained from HST and Cassini observations, was near 4 km. The dust produced in collisions retains approximately the same orbital elements as the parent bodies and slowly spirals in the direction of Jupiter forming the faint (in back-scattered light) innermost part of the main ring and halo ring. The age of the main ring is currently unknown, but it may be the last remnant of a past population of small bodies near Jupiter.

=== Vertical corrugations ===
Images from the Galileo and New Horizons space probes show the presence of two sets of spiraling vertical corrugations in the main ring. These waves became more tightly wound over time at the rate expected for differential nodal regression in Jupiter's gravity field. Extrapolating backwards, the more prominent of the two sets of waves appears to have been excited in 1995, around the time of the impact of Comet Shoemaker-Levy 9 with Jupiter, while the smaller set appears to date to the first half of 1990. Galileo's November 1996 observations are consistent with wavelengths of 1920 ± 150 and 630 ± 20 km, and vertical amplitudes of 2.4 ± 0.7 and 0.6 ± 0.2 km, for the larger and smaller sets of waves, respectively. The formation of the larger set of waves can be explained if the ring was impacted by a cloud of particles released by the comet with a total mass on the order of 2–5 trillion kg, which would have tilted the ring out of the equatorial plane by 2 km. A similar spiraling wave pattern that tightens over time has been observed by Cassini in Saturns's C and D rings.

== Halo ring ==
=== Appearance and structure ===
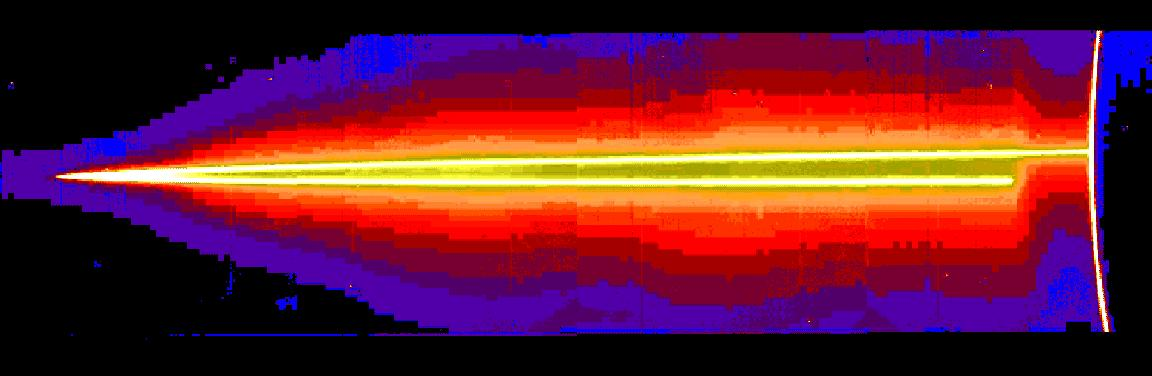
False color image of the halo ring obtained by Galileo in forward-scattered light

The halo ring is the innermost and the vertically thickest Jovian ring. Its outer edge coincides with the inner boundary of the main ring approximately at the radius 122500 km (1.72 R_{J}). From this radius the ring becomes rapidly thicker towards Jupiter. The true vertical extent of the halo is not known but the presence of its material was detected as high as 10000 km over the ring plane. The inner boundary of the halo is relatively sharp and located at the radius 100000 km (1.4 R_{J}), but some material is present further inward to approximately 92000 km. Thus the width of the halo ring is about 30000 km. Its shape resembles a thick torus without clear internal structure. In contrast to the main ring, the halo's appearance depends only slightly on the viewing geometry.

The halo ring appears brightest in forward-scattered light, in which it was extensively imaged by Galileo. While its surface brightness is much less than that of the main ring, its vertically (perpendicular to the ring plane) integrated photon flux is comparable due to its much larger thickness. Despite a claimed vertical extent of more than 20000 km, the halo's brightness is strongly concentrated towards the ring plane and follows a power law of the form z^{−0.6} to z^{−1.5}, where z is altitude over the ring plane. The halo's appearance in the back-scattered light, as observed by Keck and HST, is the same. However its total photon flux is several times lower than that of the main ring and is more strongly concentrated near the ring plane than in the forward-scattered light.

The spectral properties of the halo ring are different from the main ring. The flux distribution in the range 0.5–2.5 μm is flatter than in the main ring; the halo is not red and may even be blue.

=== Origin of the halo ring ===
The optical properties of the halo ring can be explained by the hypothesis that it comprises only dust with particle sizes less than 15 μm. Parts of the halo located far from the ring plane may consist of submicrometre dust. This dusty composition explains the much stronger forward-scattering, bluer colors and lack of visible structure in the halo. The dust probably originates in the main ring, a claim supported by the fact that the halo's optical depth $\scriptstyle\tau_s\,\sim\,10^{-6}$ is comparable with that of the dust in the main ring. The large thickness of the halo can be attributed to the excitation of orbital inclinations and eccentricities of dust particles by the electromagnetic forces in the Jovian magnetosphere. The outer boundary of the halo ring coincides with location of a strong 3:2 Lorentz resonance. (Note: Lorentz resonance is a resonance between particle's orbital motion and rotation of planetary magnetosphere, when the ratio of their periods is a rational number.) As Poynting–Robertson drag causes particles to slowly drift towards Jupiter, their orbital inclinations are excited while passing through it. The bloom of the main ring may be a beginning of the halo. The halo ring's inner boundary is not far from the strongest 2:1 Lorentz resonance. In this resonance the excitation is probably very significant, forcing particles to plunge into the Jovian atmosphere thus defining a sharp inner boundary. Being derived from the main ring, the halo has the same age.

== Gossamer rings ==
=== Amalthea gossamer ring ===
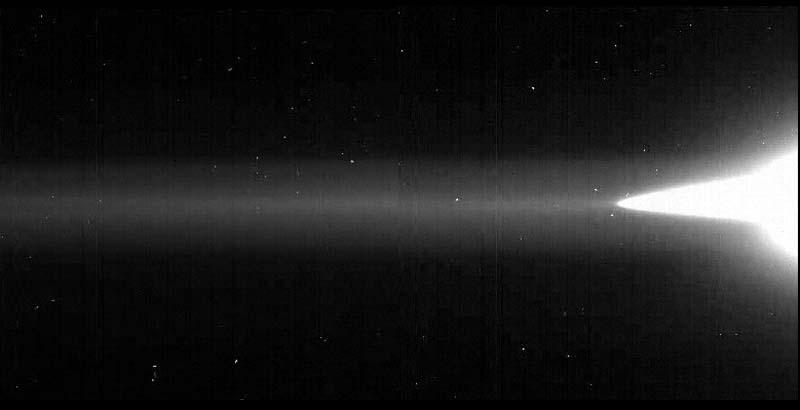
Image of the gossamer rings obtained by Galileo in forward-scattered light

The Amalthea gossamer ring is a very faint structure with a rectangular cross section, stretching from the orbit of Amalthea at 182000 km (2.54 RJ) to about 129000 km (1.80 R_{J}). Its inner boundary is not clearly defined because of the presence of the much brighter main ring and halo. The thickness of the ring is approximately 2300 km near the orbit of Amalthea and slightly decreases in the direction of Jupiter. (Note: The thickness of the gossamer rings is defined here as the distance between peaks of brightness at their top and bottom edges.) The Amalthea gossamer ring is actually the brightest near its top and bottom edges and becomes gradually brighter towards Jupiter; one of the edges is often brighter than another. The outer boundary of the ring is relatively steep; the ring's brightness drops abruptly just inward of the orbit of Amalthea, although it may have a small extension beyond the orbit of the satellite ending near 4:3 resonance with Thebe. In forward-scattered light the ring appears to be about 30 times fainter than the main ring. In back-scattered light it has been detected only by the Keck telescope and the ACS (Advanced Camera for Surveys) on HST. Back-scattering images show additional structure in the ring: a peak in the brightness just inside the Amalthean orbit and confined to the top or bottom edge of the ring.

In 2002–2003 Galileo spacecraft had two passes through the gossamer rings. During them its dust counter detected dust particles in the size range 0.2–5 μm. In addition, the Galileo spacecraft's star scanner detected small, discrete bodies (< 1 km) near Amalthea. These may represent collisional debris generated from impacts with this satellite.

The detection of the Amalthea gossamer ring from the ground, in Galileo images and the direct dust measurements have allowed the determination of the particle size distribution, which appears to follow the same power law as the dust in the main ring with q=2 ± 0.5. The optical depth of this ring is about 10^{−7}, which is an order of magnitude lower than that of the main ring, but the total mass of the dust (10^{7}–10^{9} kg) is comparable.

=== Thebe gossamer ring ===
The Thebe gossamer ring is the faintest Jovian ring. It appears as a very faint structure with a rectangular cross section, stretching from the Thebean orbit at 226000 km (3.11 R_{J}) to about 129000 km (1.80 R_{J};). Its inner boundary is not clearly defined because of the presence of the much brighter main ring and halo. The thickness of the ring is approximately 8400 km near the orbit of Thebe and slightly decreases in the direction of the planet. The Thebe gossamer ring is brightest near its top and bottom edges and gradually becomes brighter towards Jupiter—much like the Amalthea ring. The outer boundary of the ring is not especially steep, stretching over 15000 km. There is a barely visible continuation of the ring beyond the orbit of Thebe, extending up to 280000 km (3.75 R_{J}) and called the Thebe Extension. In forward-scattered light the ring appears to be about 3 times fainter than the Amalthea gossamer ring. In back-scattered light it has been detected only by the Keck telescope. Back-scattering images show a peak of brightness just inside the orbit of Thebe. In 2002–2003 the dust counter of the Galileo spacecraft detected dust particles in the size range 0.2–5 μm—similar to those in the Amalthea ring—and confirmed the results obtained from imaging.

The optical depth of the Thebe gossamer ring is about 3 × 10^{−8}, which is three times lower than the Amalthea gossamer ring, but the total mass of the dust is the same—about 10^{7}–10^{9} kg. However the particle size distribution of the dust is somewhat shallower than in the Amalthea ring. It follows a power law with q < 2. In the Thebe extension the parameter q may be even smaller.

=== Origin of the gossamer rings ===
The dust in the gossamer rings originates in essentially the same way as that in the main ring and halo. Its sources are the inner Jovian moons Amalthea and Thebe respectively. High velocity impacts by projectiles coming from outside the Jovian system eject dust particles from their surfaces. These particles initially retain the same orbits as their moons but then gradually spiral inward by Poynting–Robertson drag. The thickness of the gossamer rings is determined by vertical excursions of the moons due to their nonzero orbital inclinations. This hypothesis naturally explains almost all observable properties of the rings: rectangular cross-section, decrease of thickness in the direction of Jupiter and brightening of the top and bottom edges of the rings.

However some properties have so far gone unexplained, like the Thebe Extension, which may be due to unseen bodies outside Thebe's orbit, and structures visible in the back-scattered light. One possible explanation of the Thebe Extension is influence of the electromagnetic forces from the Jovian magnetosphere. When the dust enters the shadow behind Jupiter, it loses its electrical charge fairly quickly. Since the small dust particles partially corotate with the planet, they will move outward during the shadow pass creating an outward extension of the Thebe gossamer ring. The same forces can explain a dip in the particle distribution and ring's brightness, which occurs between the orbits of Amalthea and Thebe.

The peak in the brightness is just inside of Amalthea's orbit, and therefore, the vertical asymmetry the Amalthea gossamer ring may be due to the dust particles trapped at the leading (L_{4}) and trailing (L_{5}) Lagrange points of this moon. The particles may also follow horseshoe orbits between the Lagrangian points. The dust may be present at the leading and trailing Lagrange points of Thebe as well. This discovery implies that there are two particle populations in the gossamer rings: one slowly drifts in the direction of Jupiter as described above, while another remains near a source moon trapped in 1:1 resonance with it.

== Himalia ring ==
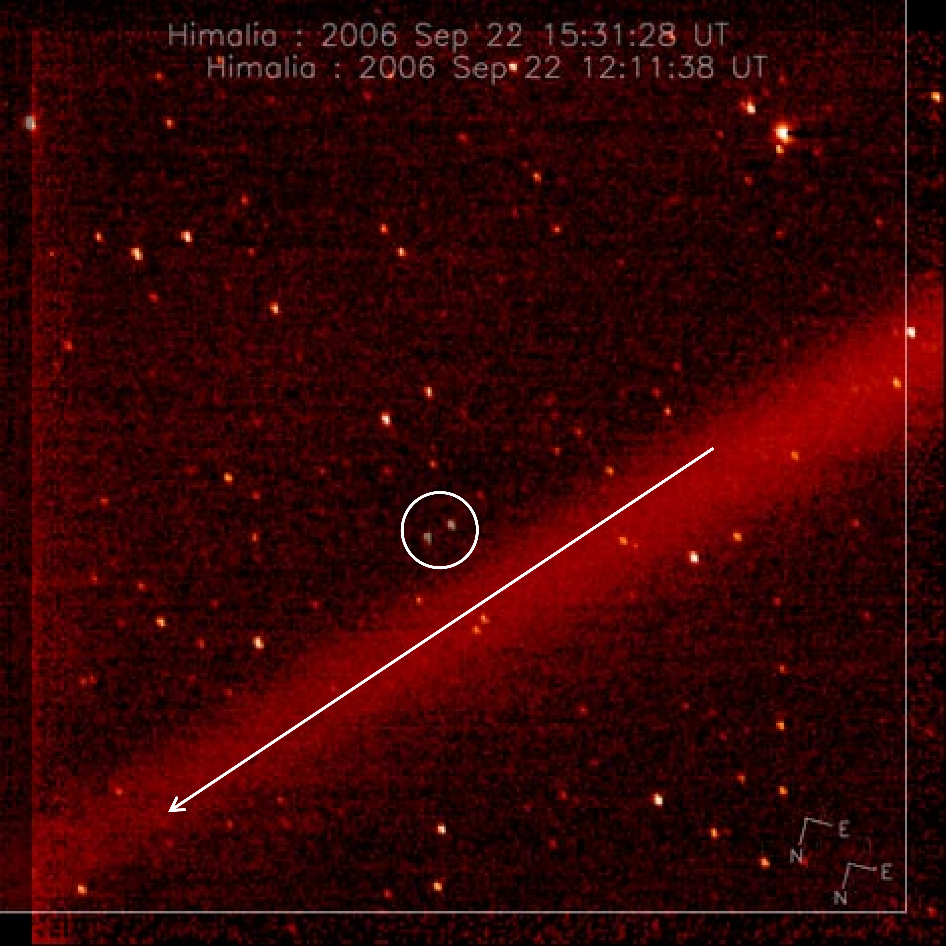
Composite of six New Horizons images of the possible Himalia ring. The double exposure of Himalia is circled. The arrow points to Jupiter.

In September 2006, as NASA's New Horizons mission to Pluto approached Jupiter for a gravity assist, it photographed what appeared to be a faint, previously unknown planetary ring or ring arc, parallel with and slightly inside the orbit of the irregular satellite Himalia. The amount of material in the part of the ring or arc imaged by New Horizons was at least 0.04 km^{3}, assuming it had the same albedo as Himalia. If the ring (arc) is debris from Himalia, it must have formed quite recently, given the century-scale precession of the Himalian orbit. It is possible that the ring could be debris from the impact of a very small undiscovered moon into Himalia, suggesting that Jupiter might continue to gain and lose small moons through collisions.

== Exploration ==
The existence of the Jovian rings was inferred from observations of the planetary radiation belts by Pioneer 11 spacecraft in 1975. In 1979 the Voyager 1 spacecraft obtained a single overexposed image of the ring system. More extensive imaging was conducted by Voyager 2 in the same year, which allowed rough determination of the ring's structure. The superior quality of the images obtained by the Galileo orbiter between 1995 and 2003 greatly extended the existing knowledge about the Jovian rings. Ground-based observation of the rings by the Keck telescope in 1997 and 2002 and the HST in 1999 revealed the rich structure visible in back-scattered light. Images transmitted by the New Horizons spacecraft in February–March 2007 allowed observation of the fine structure in the main ring for the first time. In 2000, the Cassini spacecraft en route to Saturn conducted extensive observations of the Jovian ring system. Future missions to the Jovian system will provide additional information about the rings.

== Gallery ==
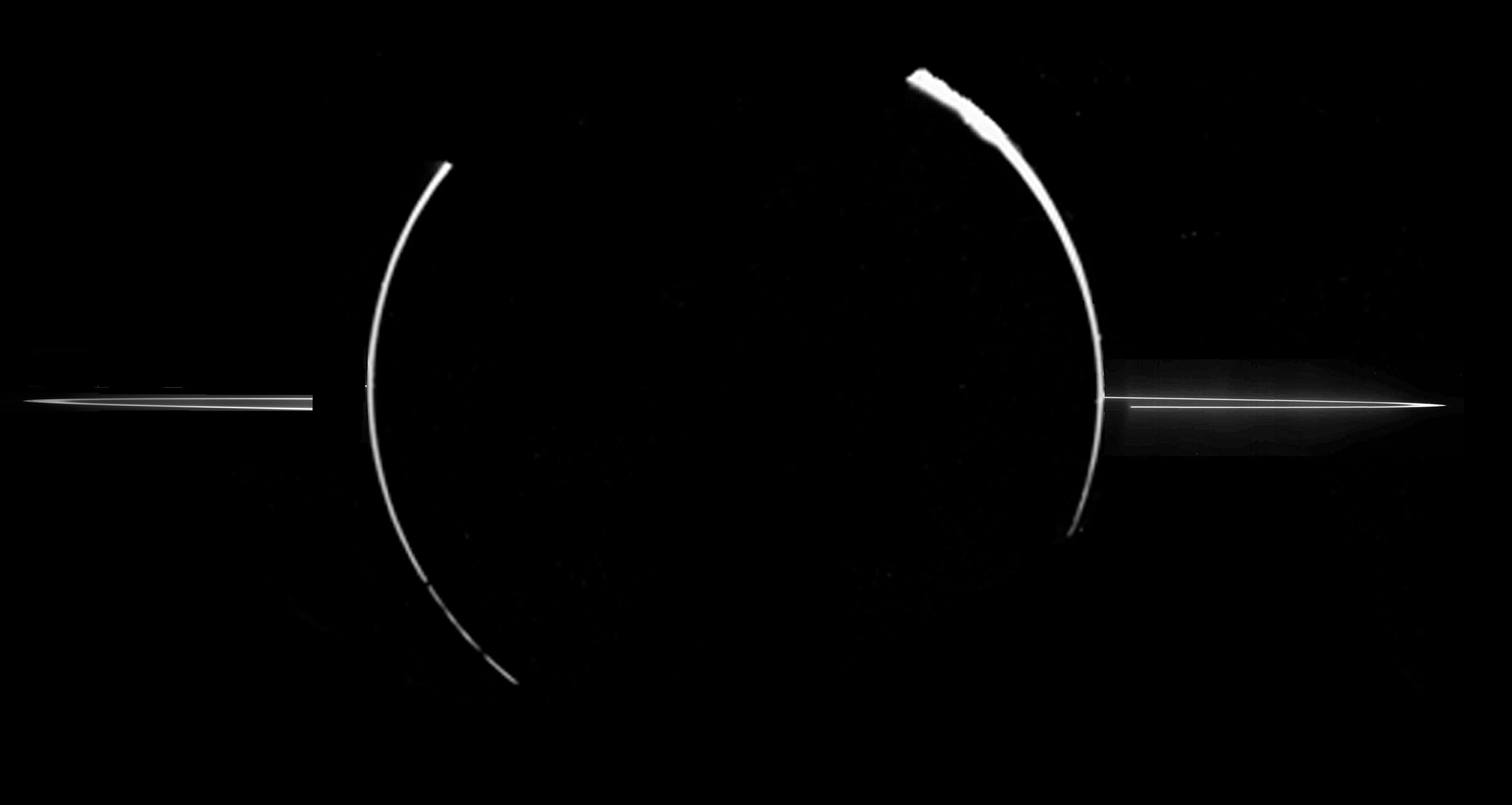
The ring system as imaged by Galileo

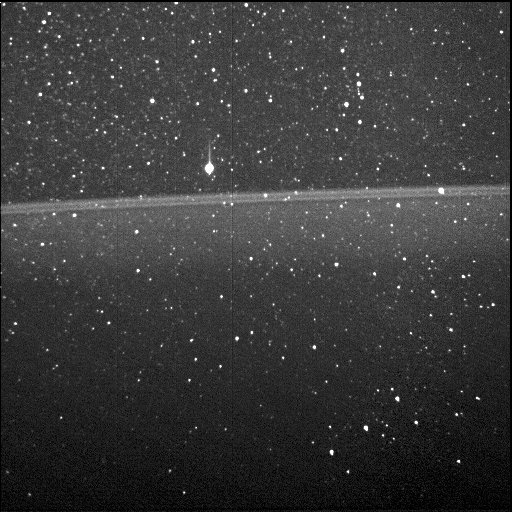
The rings as observed from the inside by Juno

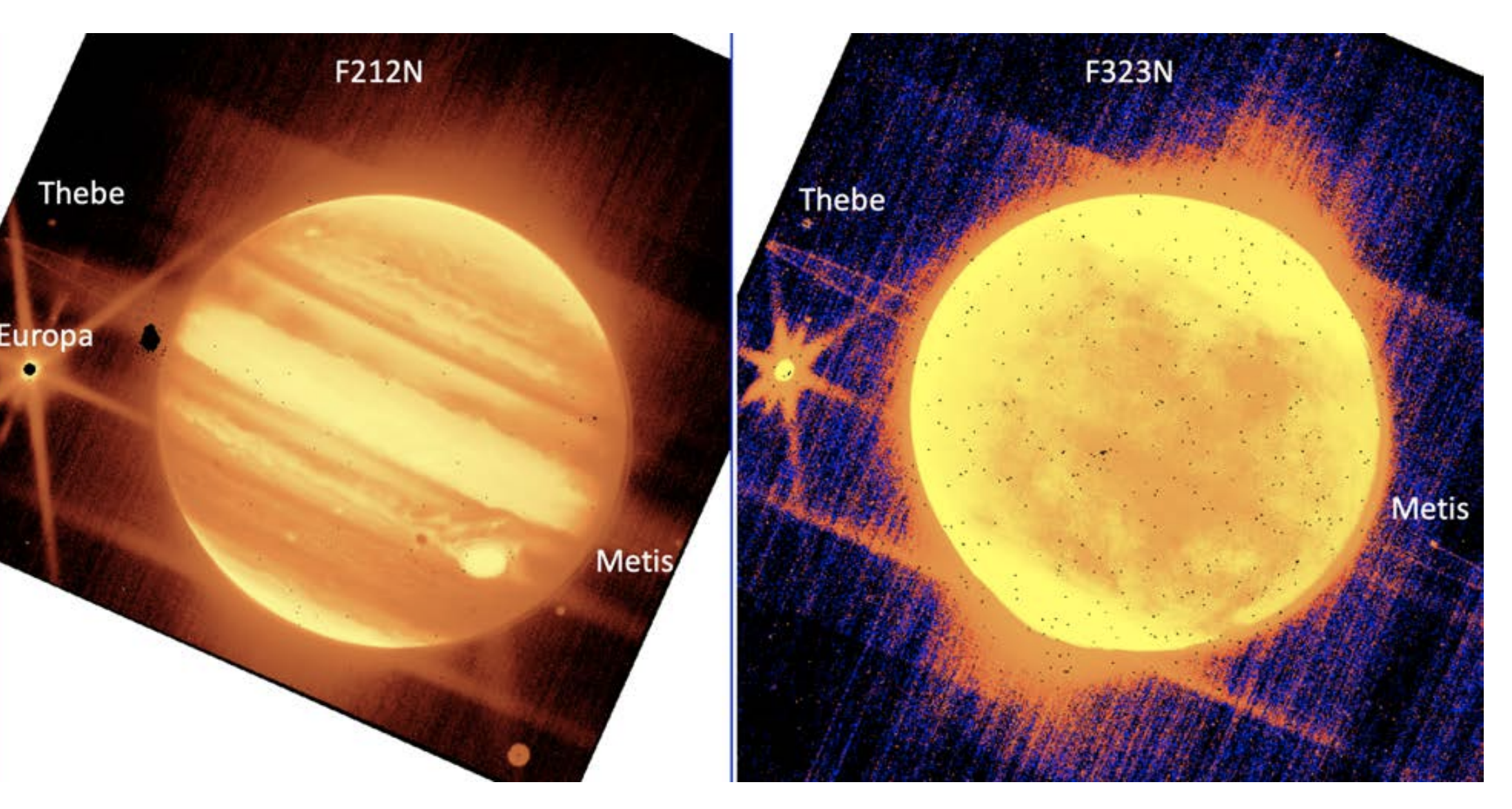
James Webb Space Telescope's photo of Jupiter and rings in infrared at 2.12 and 3.23 μm

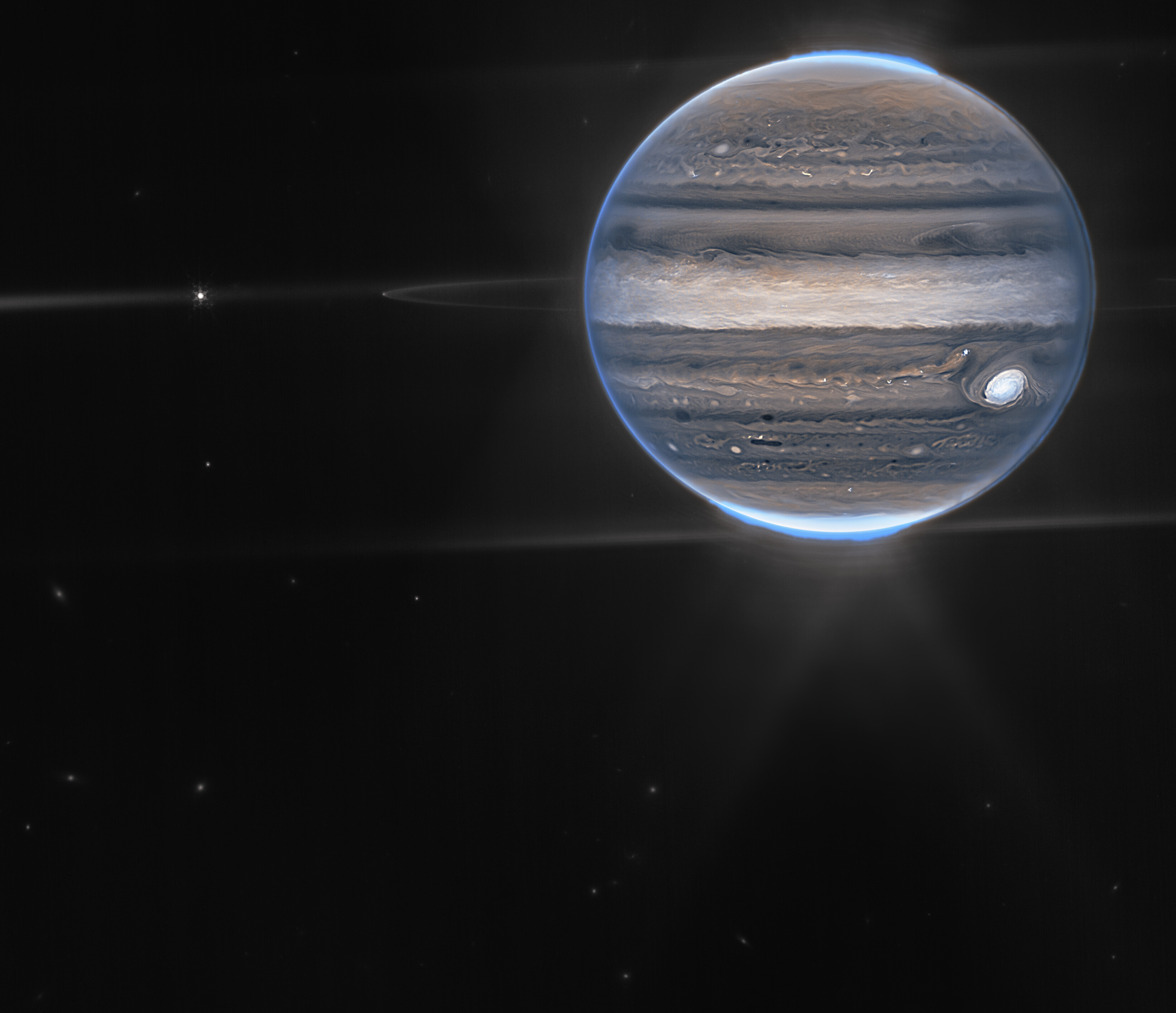
James Webb Telescope image of Jupiter, taken in Infrared light, reveals its faint rings, along with two moons, Amalthea and Adrastea, auroras, and features of its atmosphere.

== See also ==
- Moons of Jupiter
