= Adrastea (moon) =

Moon of Jupiter

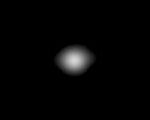
- Image of Adrastea taken by Galileo spacecraft between November 1996 and June 1997

Discovery
- Discovered by: David C. Jewitt; G. Edward Danielson
- Discovery date: 8 July 1979

Designations
- Pronunciation: /ædrəˈstiːə/
- Named after: Ἀδράστεια Adrasteia
- Adjectives: Adrastean /ædrəˈstiːən/

Orbital characteristics
- Epoch JED 2451891.0
- Mean orbit radius: 128980.5±0.1 km (1.806 R_{J})
- Eccentricity: 0.0015±0.0009
- Orbital period (sidereal): 7.158 h
- Average orbital speed: 31.45 km/s (Note: Calculated on the basis of other parameters.)
- Mean motion: 1207.001±0.001 °/d
- Inclination: 0.03°±0.01° (to Jupiter's equator)
- Satellite of: Jupiter

Physical characteristics
- Dimensions: 20 × 16 × 14 km
- Mean radius: 8.2±2.0 km
- Volume: ≈2345 km^{3}
- Synodic rotation period: assumed synchronous
- Axial tilt: assumed zero
- Albedo: 0.10±0.045
- Temperature: ≈122 K
- Apparent magnitude: 18.7 (V)
- Absolute magnitude (H): 12.1

Adrastea (/ædrəˈstiːə/), also known as Jupiter XV, is the second by distance, and the smallest of the four inner moons of Jupiter. It was discovered in photographs taken by Voyager 2 in 1979, making it the first natural satellite to be discovered from images taken by an interplanetary spacecraft, rather than through a telescope. It was officially named after the mythological Adrasteia, foster mother of the Greek god Zeus—the equivalent of the Roman god Jupiter.

Adrastea is one of the few moons in the Solar System known to orbit its planet in less than the length of that planet's day. It orbits at the edge of Jupiter's main ring and is thought to be the main contributor of material to the rings of Jupiter. Despite observations made in the 1990s by the Galileo spacecraft, very little is known about the moon's physical characteristics other than its size and the fact that it is tidally locked to Jupiter.

== Discovery and observations ==
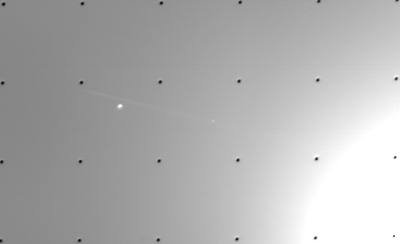
Discovery image of Adrastea, taken on July 8, 1979, by Voyager 2. Adrastea is the fainter dot, in the very middle, straddling the line of the Jovian rings.

Adrastea was discovered by David C. Jewitt and G. Edward Danielson in Voyager 2 probe photographs taken on July 8, 1979, and received the designation S/1979 J 1. Although it appeared only as a dot, it was the first moon to be discovered by an interplanetary spacecraft. Soon after its discovery, two other of the inner moons of Jupiter (Thebe and Metis) were observed in the images taken a few months earlier by Voyager 1. The Galileo spacecraft was able to determine the moon's shape in 1998, but the images remain poor. In 1983, Adrastea was officially named after the Greek nymph Adrastea, the daughter of Zeus and his lover Ananke.

Although the Juno orbiter, which arrived at Jupiter in 2016, has a camera called JunoCam, it is almost entirely focused on observations of Jupiter itself. However, if all goes well, it should be able to capture some limited images of the moons Thebe, Metis and Adrastea. A close flyby of Adrastea was planned for June 3, 2026, on Juno's 84th perijove. One source states that during this, the spacecraft passed within 11,747 km from the moon, while another predicts the flyby was closer to 40,000 km. The second source also suggested an Adrastea flyby within 10,200 km on Juno's 86th perijove on August 7, 2026.

== Physical characteristics ==
Adrastea has an irregular shape and measures 20 km × 16 km × 14 km across. This makes it the smallest of the four inner moons. The bulk, composition, and mass of Adrastea are not known, but assuming that its mean density is like that of Amalthea, around 0.86 g/cm^{3}, its mass can be estimated at 2×10^{15} kg. Amalthea's density implies that the moon is composed of water ice with a porosity of 10–15%, and Adrastea may be similar.

The albedo of Adrastea is 0.10±0.045, however no surface details are known, due to the low resolution of available images.

== Orbit ==
Adrastea is the smallest and second-closest member of the inner Jovian satellite family. It orbits Jupiter at 113,000 km/h (70,200 mph) at a radius of about 129,000 km (80,000 mi) (1.806 Jupiter radii) at the exterior edge of the planet's main ring. Its orbit has a very small eccentricity of around 0.0015 and an inclination relative to Jupiter's equator of 0.03°, respectively.

It is assumed that due to tidal locking, Adrastea rotates synchronously with its orbital period, keeping one face always looking toward the planet. Its long axis is probably aligned towards Jupiter, this being the lowest energy configuration.

The orbit of Adrastea lies inside Jupiter's synchronous orbit radius (as does Metis's), and as a result, tidal forces are slowly causing its orbit to decay so that it will one day impact Jupiter. If its density is similar to Amalthea's then its orbit would actually lie within the fluid Roche limit. However, since it is not breaking up, it must still lie outside its rigid Roche limit.

== Relationship with Jupiter's rings ==
Adrastea is the largest contributor to material in Jupiter's rings. This appears to consist primarily of material that is ejected from the surfaces of Jupiter's four small inner satellites by meteorite impacts. It is easy for the impact ejecta to be lost from these satellites into space. This is due to the satellites' low density and their surfaces lying close to the edge of their Hill spheres.

It seems that Adrastea is the most copious source of this ring material, as evidenced by the densest ring (the main ring) being located at and within Adrastea's orbit. More precisely, the orbit of Adrastea lies near the outer edge of Jupiter's main ring. The exact extent of visible ring material depends on the phase angle of the images: in forward-scattered light Adrastea is firmly outside the main ring, but in back-scattered light (which reveals much bigger particles) there appears to also be a narrow ringlet outside Adrastea's orbit.
