= Pan (crater) =

Pan is the largest crater on Jupiter's moon Amalthea. It is 89±4 kilometers across and at least 8 kilometers deep, with its center's coordinates being 30°N, 30°W. It is named after Pan, the Greek god of shepherds and the countryside, or the son of Amalthea and Hermes in some legends.
