= Ida Facula =

Mountain on Amalthea, moon of Jupiter

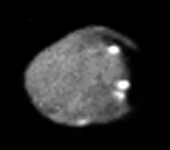
- Amalthea (photo by Voyager 1). Ida Facula is an upper bright spot
- Feature type: Mountain, bright feature
- Location: Amalthea
- Coordinates: 20.00°N 175.00°W
- Discoverer: Voyager 1
- Eponym: Mount Ida

Ida Facula is a bright mountain on Amalthea, one of Jupiter's smallest moons. It is known to be about 15 kilometers in width, somewhat smaller than the neighboring mountain Lyctos Facula. It was discovered by Voyager 1 in 1979 and in the same year named for Mount Ida, a mountain in Crete where Zeus played as a child. Firstly it was called simply Ida.
