= Lyctos Facula =

Mountain on Amalthea, moon of Jupiter

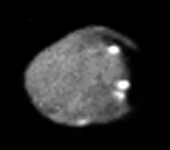
Amalthea (photo by Voyager 1). Lyctos Facula is the lower bright spot

Lyctos Facula is a bright mountain on one of Jupiter's smallest moons Amalthea. It is believed to have a width of 25 kilometers and height of 20 kilometers (65,617 feet), almost two and a half times higher than Mount Everest (29,029 feet). It is one of two named faculae that appear on Amalthea, the other being Ida Facula. It was discovered by Voyager 1 in 1979 and in the same year named for the region of Crete in which Zeus was raised. Firstly it was named simply Lyctos.
