= Thebe (moon) =

Moon of Jupiter

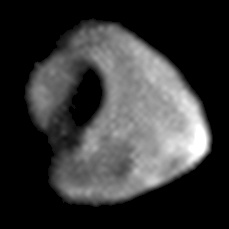
- Image of Thebe taken by the Galileo spacecraft on 4 January 2000. The large crater near the center is Zethus

Discovery
- Discovered by: Stephen P. Synnott / Voyager 1
- Discovery date: 5 March 1979

Designations
- Pronunciation: /ˈθiːbiː/
- Named after: Θήβη Thēbē
- Adjectives: Thebean /θiːˈbiːən/ (Note: The adjectives "Theban" and sometimes "Thebean" (with stress on the first syllable) refer to the city of Thebes, Greece.)

Orbital characteristics
- Periapsis: 218000 km (Note: Calculated as a×(1 − e), where a is semimajor axis and e is eccentricity.)
- Apoapsis: 226000 km (Note: Calculated as a×(1 + e), where a is semimajor axis and e is eccentricity.)
- Mean orbit radius: 221889.0±0.6 km (3.11 R_{J})
- Eccentricity: 0.0175±0.0004
- Orbital period (sidereal): 0.674536±0.000001 d (16 h 11.3 min)
- Average orbital speed: 23.92 km/s (calculated)
- Inclination: 1.076°±0.003° (to Jupiter's equator)
- Satellite of: Jupiter

Physical characteristics
- Dimensions: 116 × 98 × 84 km
- Mean radius: 49.3±2.0 km
- Surface area: 31700 km^{2}
- Volume: 505000 km^{3}
- Mass: ≥5×10^{17} kg
- Mean density: ≥1.0 g/cm^{3} ≈1.4 g/cm^{3} (likely)
- Surface gravity: 0.019 m/s^{2} (0.0019 g) (Note: The estimate from Thomas, 1998 was made assuming the density was 1.5 g/cm^{3}.)
- Escape velocity: 31–45 m/s (Note: The estimate from Burns, 2004 was made assuming the density was 2 g/cm^{3}.)
- Synodic rotation period: synchronous
- Axial tilt: ≈ 0°
- Albedo: 0.047±0.003
- Temperature: ≈ 124 K
- Apparent magnitude: 16.0 (V)
- Absolute magnitude (H): 9.0

Thebe (/ˈθiːbiː/), also known as Jupiter XIV, is the fourth of Jupiter's moons by distance from the planet. It was discovered by Stephen P. Synnott in images from the Voyager 1 space probe taken on March 5, 1979, while making its flyby of Jupiter. In 1983, it was officially named after the mythological nymph Thebe.

The second largest of the inner satellites of Jupiter, Thebe orbits within the outer edge of the Thebe gossamer ring that is formed from dust ejected from its surface. It is irregularly shaped and reddish in colour, and is thought like Amalthea to consist of porous water ice with unknown amounts of other materials. Its surface features include large craters and high mountains—some of them are comparable to the size of the moon itself.

Thebe was photographed in 1979 by the Voyager 1 and 2 spacecraft, and later, in more detail, by the Galileo orbiter in the 1990s and Juno in May 2026.

== Discovery and observations ==
Thebe was discovered by Stephen P. Synnott in images from the Voyager 1 space probe taken on March 5, 1979, and was initially given the provisional designation S/1979 J 2. In 1983 it was officially named after the mythological nymph Thebe who was a lover of Zeus—the Greek equivalent of Jupiter. This name was approved as part of an exemption from the IAU convention, which dictates that prograde moons of Jupiter must receive names ending in "a".

After its discovery by Voyager 1, Thebe was photographed by the Voyager 2 space probe in 1979. However, before the Galileo spacecraft arrived at Jupiter, knowledge about it was extremely limited. Galileo imaged almost all of the surface of Thebe and helped clarify its composition.

On May 1, 2026, Juno obtained an image of Thebe at a distance of 5,000 km.

== Orbit ==
Thebe is the outermost of the inner Jovian moons, and orbits Jupiter at a distance of about 222,000 km (3.11 Jupiter radii). Its orbit has an eccentricity of 0.018, and an inclination of 1.08° relative to the equator of Jupiter. These values are unusually high for an inner satellite and can be explained by the past influence of the innermost Galilean satellite, Io; in the past, several mean-motion resonances with Io would have passed through Thebe's orbit as Io gradually receded from Jupiter, and these excited Thebe's orbit.

The orbit of Thebe lies near the outer edge of the Thebe gossamer ring, which is composed of the dust ejected from the satellite. After ejection, the dust drifts in the direction of the planet under the action of Poynting–Robertson drag, forming a ring inward of the moon.

== Physical characteristics ==
Thebe is irregularly shaped, with the closest ellipsoidal approximation being 116 × 98 × 84 km. Its bulk density and mass are known to some extent; its mean density is greater than that of Amalthea with a lower bound of 1.0 g/cm^{3}, and more likely closer to 1.4 g/cm^{3}. Its mass has a lower bound of 5 × 10^{17} kg.

Similarly to all inner satellites of Jupiter, Thebe rotates synchronously with its orbital motion, thus keeping one face always looking toward the planet. Its orientation is such that the long axis always points to Jupiter. At the surface points closest to and furthest from Jupiter, the surface is thought to be near the edge of the Roche limit, where Thebe's gravity is only slightly larger than the centrifugal force. As a result, the escape velocity in these two points is very small, thus allowing dust to escape easily after meteorite impacts, and ejecting it into the Thebe gossamer ring.

Zethus /ˈziːθəs/ is the largest (diameter about 40 km) crater on and the only named surface feature of the moon. There are several bright spots at the rim of this crater. It is located on the far side of Thebe, facing away from Jupiter. It was discovered by the Galileo spacecraft, and it is named for Zethus (Ζῆθος), the husband of the nymph Thebe in Greek mythology.

Thebe as seen by Juno on May 1, 2026.

The surface of Thebe is dark and appears to be reddish in color, with a geometric albedo of approximately 0.047±0.003. There is a substantial asymmetry between the leading and trailing hemispheres: the leading hemisphere is 1.3 times brighter than the trailing one. The asymmetry is probably caused by the higher velocity and frequency of impacts on the leading hemisphere, which excavates a bright material (probably ice) from the interior of the moon. Its surface is heavily cratered and it appears that there are at least three or four large impact craters, each being roughly comparable in size to Thebe itself.
