= Metis (moon) =

Moon of Jupiter

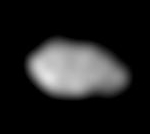
- Image taken by Galileo's Solid State Imager between November 1996 and June 1997

Discovery
- Discovered by: S. Synnott
- Discovery date: 4 March 1979

Designations
- Pronunciation: /ˈmiːtɪs/
- Named after: Μήτις Mētis
- Adjectives: Metidian, Metidean /mɛˈtɪdiən/

Orbital characteristics
- Epoch JED 2451891.0
- Periapsis: 127954 km (Note: Calculated on the basis of other parameters.)
- Apoapsis: 128005 km
- Mean orbit radius: 127979.8±0.1 km (1.792 R_{J})
- Eccentricity: 0.0002±0.0001
- Orbital period (sidereal): 7.075 h
- Average orbital speed: 31.57 km/s
- Mean motion: 1221.252±0.001 °/d
- Inclination: 0.06°±0.01° (to Jupiter's equator)
- Satellite of: Jupiter

Physical characteristics
- Dimensions: 60 km × 40 km × 34 km
- Mean diameter: 43.0 ± >3.0 km
- Surface area: 6080 km^{2}
- Volume: 41300 km^{3}
- Mass: >6.2×10^{16} kg (likely)
- Mean density: >1.5 g/cm^{3} (likely)
- Surface gravity: 0.8 cm/s^{2} (average) (Note: Assuming a density of 1.5 g/cm^{3}.)
- Escape velocity: 0.5–19 m/s (Note: Assuming a density of 2 g/cm^{3}.)
- Synodic rotation period: synchronous
- Axial tilt: ≈ 0°
- Albedo: 0.061±0.003
- Temperature: ≈ 123 K
- Apparent magnitude: 17.5 (V)
- Absolute magnitude (H): 10.5

Metis /ˈmiːtɪs/, also known as Jupiter XVI, is the innermost known moon of Jupiter. It was discovered in 1979 in images taken by Voyager 1, and was named in 1983 after the Titaness Metis, the first wife of Zeus and the mother of Athena. Additional observations made between early 1996 and September 2003 by the Galileo spacecraft allowed its surface to be imaged.

It is one of the four inner moons of Jupiter. Metis is tidally locked to Jupiter, and its shape is strongly asymmetrical, with the largest diameter being almost twice as large as the smallest one. It is also one of the two moons known to orbit Jupiter in less than the length of Jupiter's day, the other being Adrastea. It orbits within the main ring of Jupiter, and is thought to be a major contributor of ring material.

== Discovery and observations ==
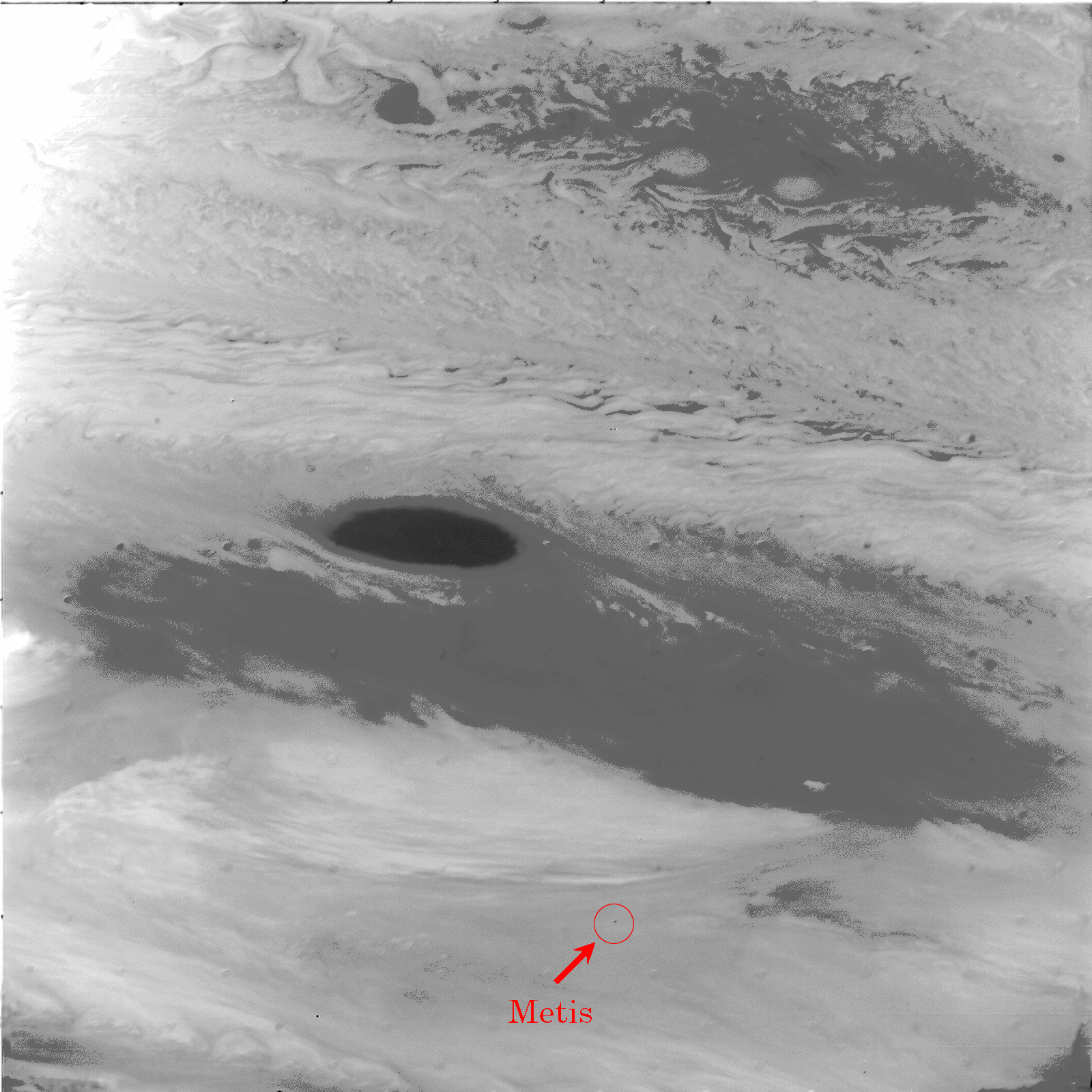
Voyager 1 discovery image of Metis on 4 March 1979, showing the moon's tiny silhouette against the backdrop of Jupiter's clouds

Metis was discovered in 1979 by Stephen P. Synnott in images taken by the Voyager 1 probe and was provisionally designated as S/1979 J 3. In 1983, it was officially named after the mythological Metis, a Titaness who was the first wife of Zeus (the Greek prototype for the Roman god Jupiter) who between her and Zeus bore a daughter, Athena. This name was approved as part of an exemption from the IAU convention, which dictates that prograde moons of Jupiter must receive names ending in "a". The photographs taken by Voyager 1 showed Metis only as a dot, and hence knowledge about Metis was very limited until the arrival of the Galileo spacecraft. Galileo imaged almost all of the surface of Metis and put constraints on its composition by 1998.

== Physical characteristics ==
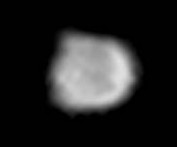
Metis imaged by Galileo on 4 January 2000

Metis has an irregular shape and measures 60 km × 40 km × 34 km across, which makes it the second smallest of the four inner satellites of Jupiter. The bulk composition and mass of Metis are not known, but it is likely that its mean density is higher than 1.5 g/cm^{3}, assuming its gravity is strong enough such that objects anywhere on its surface are always accelerated inward. Its mass can therefore be estimated as ~6.2×10^{16} kg or higher.

The surface of Metis is dark and appears to be reddish in color. While image resolution is not enough for individual craters to be identified, its irregular shape is indicative of a heavy collisional history. There is a substantial asymmetry between the leading and trailing hemispheres: the leading hemisphere is 1.3 times brighter than the trailing one. The asymmetry is probably caused by the higher velocity and frequency of impacts on the leading hemisphere, which excavates a bright material (presumably ice) from its interior. The geometric albedo of Metis is approximately 0.061±0.003.

== Orbit and rotation ==
Metis is the innermost of Jupiter's four small inner moons. It orbits Jupiter at a distance of ~128,000 km (1.79 Jupiter radii) within Jupiter's main ring. Metis's orbit has very small eccentricity (~0.0002) and inclination (~ 0.06°) relative to the equator of Jupiter.

Due to tidal locking, Metis rotates synchronously with its orbital period (about 7 hours), with its longest axis aligned towards Jupiter. Jupiter casts a shadow on all of Metis for 68 minutes each Metian day.

Metis lies inside Jupiter's synchronous orbit radius (as does Adrastea), and as a result, tidal forces slowly cause its orbit to decay. If its density is similar to Amalthea's, Metis's orbit lies within the fluid Roche limit; however, because it has not broken up, it must lie outside its rigid Roche limit.

== Relationship with Jupiter's rings ==
Metis orbiting at the edge of Jupiter's Main Ring, as imaged by the New Horizons spacecraft on 24 February 2007

Metis's orbit lies ~1,000 km within the main ring of Jupiter. It orbits within a ~500 km wide "gap" or "notch" in the ring. The gap is clearly somehow related to the moon but the origin of this connection has not been established. Metis supplies a significant part of the main ring's dust. This material appears to consist primarily of material that is ejected from the surfaces of Jupiter's four small inner satellites by meteorite impacts. It is easy for the impact ejecta to be lost from the satellites into space because the satellites' surfaces lie fairly close to the edge of their Roche spheres due to their low density.

== See also ==
- Timeline of discovery of Solar System planets and their moons
- Inner satellite
- Rings of Jupiter
