= List of geological features on Ariel =

This list of geological features on Ariel itemizes the named geological features on the moon of Uranus called Ariel. Nearly all of the features are named for bright spirits of world mythologies. All information in the tables below comes from the United States Geological Survey.

== Chasmata ==
Chasmata are deep, elongated, steep-sided depression. Arielian chasmata are named for spirits from mythology.

| Name | Coordinates | Length (km) | Approval Date | Namesake | Refs |
|---|---|---|---|---|---|
| Brownie Chasma | 16°S 37.6°E | 343 | 1988 | Brownies (British folklore) | WGPSN |
| Kachina Chasma | 33.7°S 246°E | 622 | 1988 | Kachina (Hopi mythology) | WGPSN |
| Kewpie Chasma | 28.3°S 326.9°E | 467 | 1988 | Kewpie (British folklore) | WGPSN |
| Korrigan Chasma | 27.6°S 347.5°E | 365 | 1988 | Korrigans (Breton folklore) | WGPSN |
| Kra Chasma | 32.1°S 354.2°E | 142 | 1988 | Kra (Akan belief system) | WGPSN |
| Pixie Chasma | 20.4°S 5.1°E | 278 | 1988 | Pixie (British folklore) | WGPSN |
| Sylph Chasma | 48.6°S 353°E | 349 | 1988 | Sylph (British folklore) | WGPSN |

== Craters ==
Arielian craters are named after spirits from mythology.

| Name | Coordinates | Diameter (km) | Approval Date | Namesake | Refs |
|---|---|---|---|---|---|
| Abans | 15.5°S 251.3°E | 20 | 1988 | Aban (Persian mythology) | WGPSN |
| Agape | 46.9°S 336.5°E | 34 | 1988 | Agape (Spenser) | WGPSN |
| Ataksak | 53.1°S 224.3°E | 22 | 1988 | Ataksak (Inuit mythology) | WGPSN |
| Befana | 17°S 31.9°E | 21 | 1988 | Befana (Italian folklore) | WGPSN |
| Berylune | 22.5°S 327.9°E | 29 | 1988 | Bérylune (Maurice Maeterlinck) | WGPSN |
| Deive | 22.3°S 23°E | 20 | 1988 | Deive (Lithuanian folklore) | WGPSN |
| Djadek | 12°S 251.1°E | 22 | 1988 | Djadek (Czech folklore) | WGPSN |
| Domovoy | 71.5°S 339.7°E | 71 | 1988 | Domovoi (Slavic mythology) | WGPSN |
| Finvara | 15.8°S 19°E | 31 | 1988 | Finvarra (Irish mythology) | WGPSN |
| Gwyn | 77.5°S 22.5°E | 34 | 1988 | Gwyn ap Nudd (Welsh mythology) | WGPSN |
| Huon | 37.8°S 33.7°E | 40 | 1988 | Huon of Bordeaux (French literature) | WGPSN |
| Laica | 21.3°S 44.4°E | 30 | 1988 | Laica (Incan mythology) | WGPSN |
| Mab | 38.8°S 352.2°E | 34 | 1988 | Queen Mab (English folklore) | WGPSN |
| Melusine | 52.9°S 8.9°E | 50 | 1988 | Melusine (French literature) | WGPSN |
| Oonagh | 21.9°S 244.4°E | 39 | 1988 | Oonagh (Irish mythology) | WGPSN |
| Rima | 18.3°S 260.8°E | 41 | 1988 | Rima (William Henry Hudson's Green Mansions) | WGPSN |
| Yangoor | 68.7°S 279.7°E | 78 | 1988 | Yangoor (a good spirit who brings the daylight) | WGPSN |

== Valles ==
Arielian valles are grooves running along the median line of chasmata. They are named after spirits from mythology.

| Name | Coordinates | Diameter (km) | Approval Date | Namesake | Refs |
|---|---|---|---|---|---|
| Leprechaun Vallis | 10.4°S 10.2°E | 328 | 1988 | Leprechauns of Irish mythology | WGPSN |
| Sprite Vallis | 14.9°S 340°E | 305 | 1988 | Sprites of Celtic mythology | WGPSN |
