= List of geological features on Oberon =

This is a list of named geological features (mostly craters) on Oberon.

== Chasmata ==
There is one named chasm on Oberon.

Chasma	Coordinates	Diameter (km)	Approval Date	Named After	Ref
Mommur Chasma	16.3°S 323.5°E	537	1988	Mommur, English folklore	WGPSN

== Craters ==
Oberonian craters are named after characters in the plays of William Shakespeare.

Crater	Coordinates	Diameter (km)	Approval Date	Named After	Ref
Antony	27.5°S 65.4°E	47	1988	Mark Antony	WGPSN
Caesar	26.6°S 61.1°E	76	1988	Julius Caesar	WGPSN
Coriolanus	11.4°S 345.2°E	120	1988	Coriolanus	WGPSN
Falstaff	22.1°S 19°E	124	1988	Falstaff	WGPSN
Hamlet	46.1°S 44.4°E	206	1988	Hamlet	WGPSN
Lear	5.4°S 31.5°E	126	1988	King Lear	WGPSN
Macbeth	58.4°S 112.5°E	203	1988	Macbeth	WGPSN
Othello	66°S 42.9°E	114	1988	Othello	WGPSN
Romeo	28.7°S 89.4°E	159	1988	Romeo	WGPSN
