= Kewpie (disambiguation) =

Kewpie is a brand of dolls and figurines.

Kewpie may also refer to:

As a nickname:

- Dick Barrett (baseball) (1906–1966), American Major League Baseball pitcher
- Johnny Ertel (1897–1976), Hungarian-born American boxer
- Kewpie (drag artist) (1942–2012), South African drag artist and hairdresser
- Kewpie Morgan (1892–1956), American silent film actor
- Kewpie Pennington (1896–1953), American Major League Baseball pitcher (for one game)
- Kewpie Ross, silent film actor – see the Ton of Fun comedy team

Other uses:

- Kewpie Chasma, a chasm on Ariel, a moon of the planet Uranus – see List of geological features on Ariel
- Kewpie (mayonnaise), a Japanese brand of mayonnaise
- Kewpie, a character in the 1935 Broadway play Paradise Lost and the film adaptation
- the sports teams of David H. Hickman High School, Columbia, Missouri, United States

== See also ==
- Archdale Parkhill (1878–1947), Australian politician nicknamed "Sir Kewpie"
- Kewpee, the second known chain of hamburger fast-food restaurants, founded in 1923
