= QP =

QP, Qp, or Q_{p} may refer to:

== Computing ==
- Quoted-printable, an encoding to send 8-bit data over 7-bit path '=09'
- QP (Quantum Platform), a framework for building real-time embedded applications

== Medicine ==
- Qualified person (European Union), in European Union pharmaceutical regulation
- ATCvet code QP, designation for antiparasitic veterinary medication

== Mathematics ==
- Q_{p}, the field of p-adic numbers
- Quadratic programming, a special type of mathematical optimization problem
- Quasi-polynomial time, relating to time complexity in computer science
- QP or EQP, Exact Quantum Polynomial time in computational complexity theory

== Other uses ==
- Akasa Air (IATA code: QP), an Indian low-cost airline
- qp ligature, a ligature of Latin
- Qp-Crazy, a Japanese hardcore punk and industrial metal band
- Quarter Pounder, a hamburger
- Qatar Petroleum, former name of the oil and gas company QatarEnergy
- QP, a manga series by Hiroshi Takahashi
- Quality planning, which is also known as quality management
- Queerplatonic, a term used to describe a non-romantic relationship between significant others

== See also ==
- Kewpie (disambiguation)
