= Domovoy (crater) =

Crater on Ariel

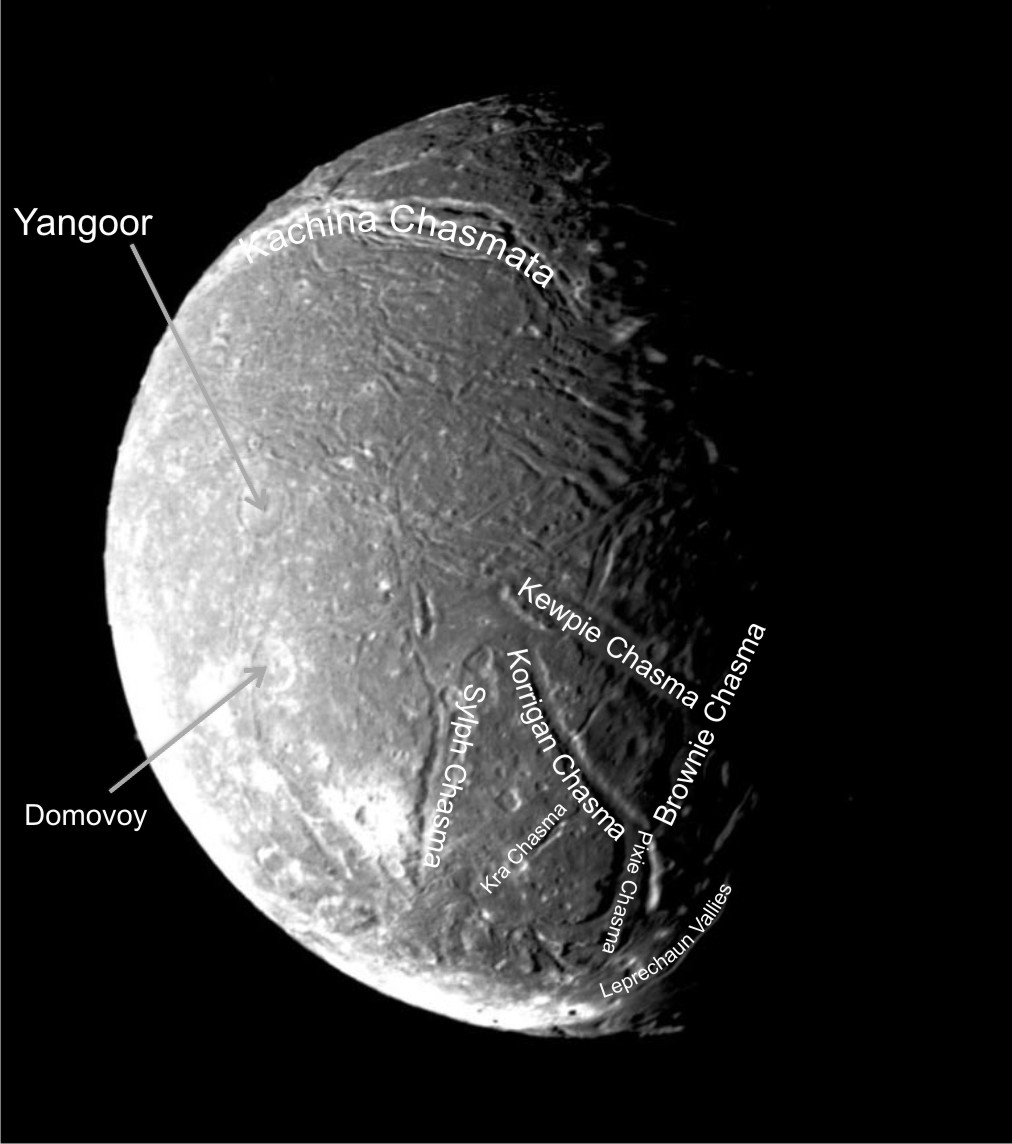
- Annotated Voyager 2 image of Ariel with Domovoy left, below the center
- Feature type: Impact crater
- Location: Ariel
- Coordinates: 71.5°S 339.7°W
- Diameter: 71 kilometres (44 mi)
- Discoverer: Voyager 2
- Eponym: Domovoy

Domovoy is the second-largest known crater on Uranus's Ariel's surface, with a diameter of 71 km. The name comes from Domovoy, a spirit that protects homes in Slavic mythology; this name was approved by the International Astronomical Union in 1988. It was imaged for the first time by the Voyager 2 spacecraft in its January 1986 flyby of the Uranian system.

== See also ==
- Yangoor – a nearby similarly sized crater
- List of geological features on Ariel
