= Brownie Chasma =

Chasma on Ariel

- Feature type: Chasma
- Coordinates: 33.7°S 246°E
- Diameter: 343 km
- Eponym: Brownie spirits

The Brownie Chasma is a chasma located on Ariel. They are named after brownies, which are spirits believed to help with household tasks.
