= Rift valley =

Linear lowland created by a tectonic rift or fault

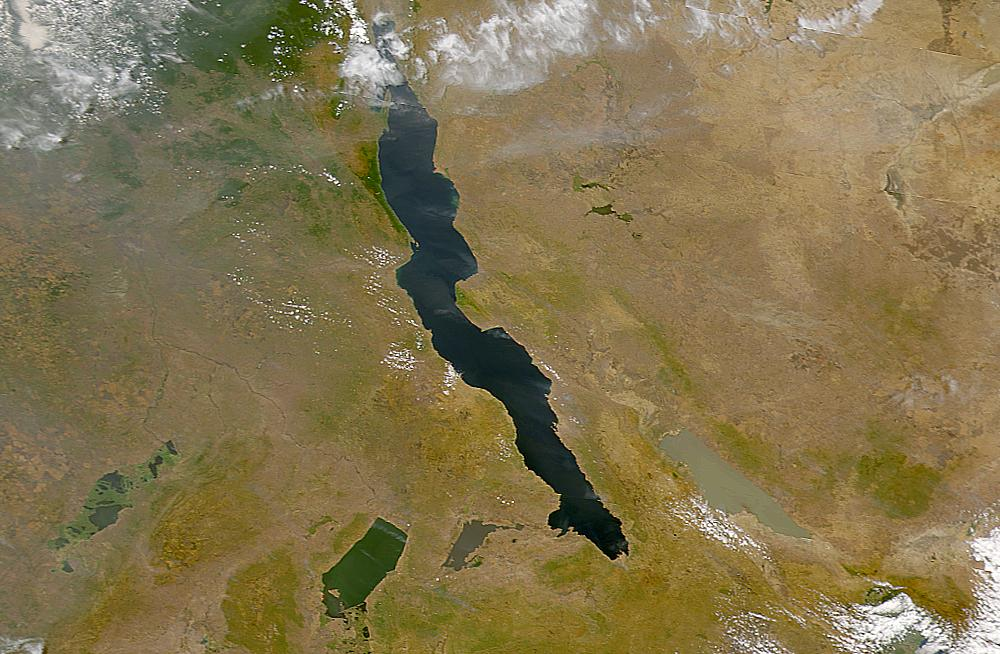
African Rift Valley. From left to right: Lake Upemba, Lake Mweru, Lake Tanganyika (largest), and Lake Rukwa.

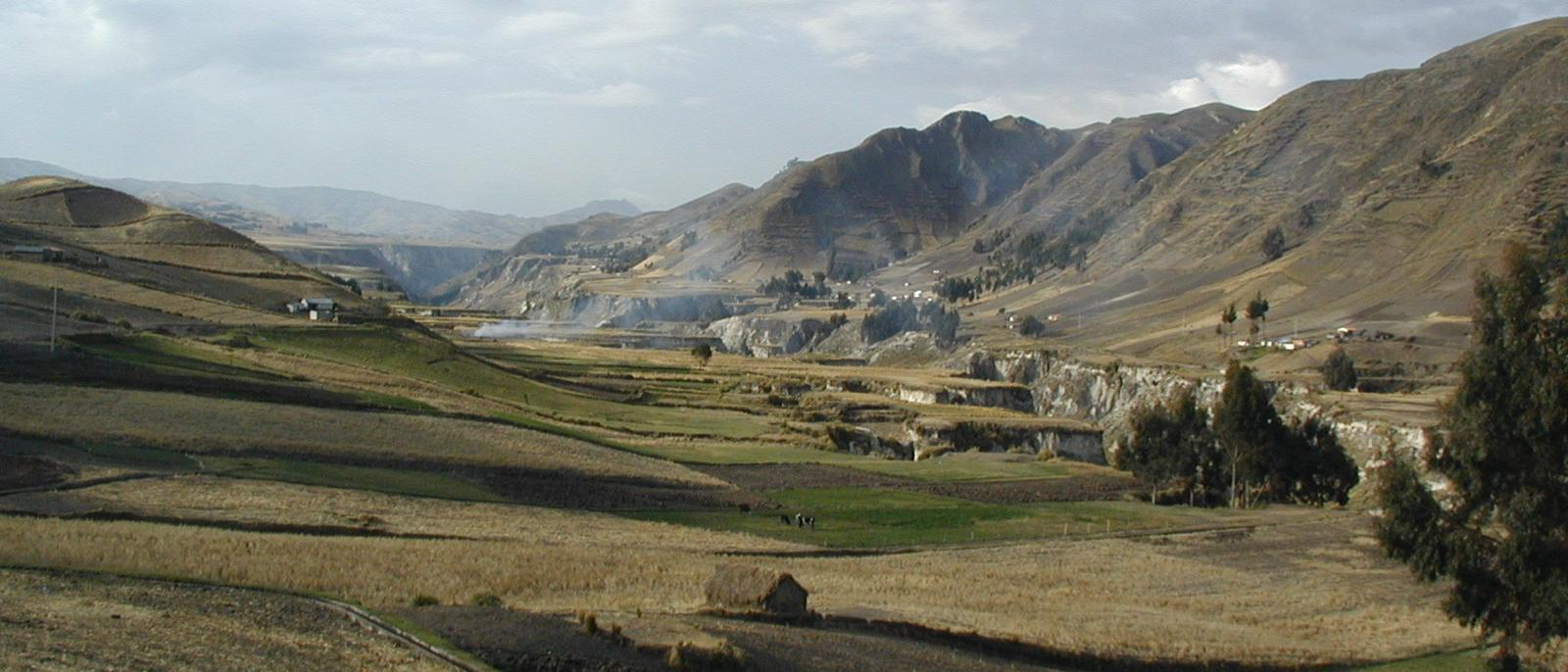
A rift valley near Quilotoa, Ecuador.

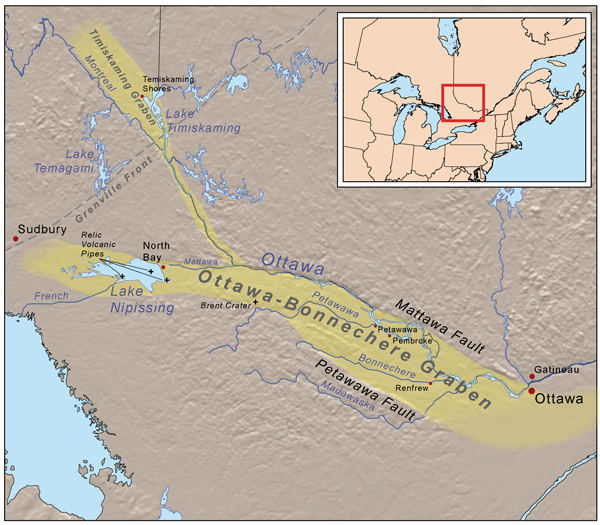
The Ottawa-Bonnechere Graben

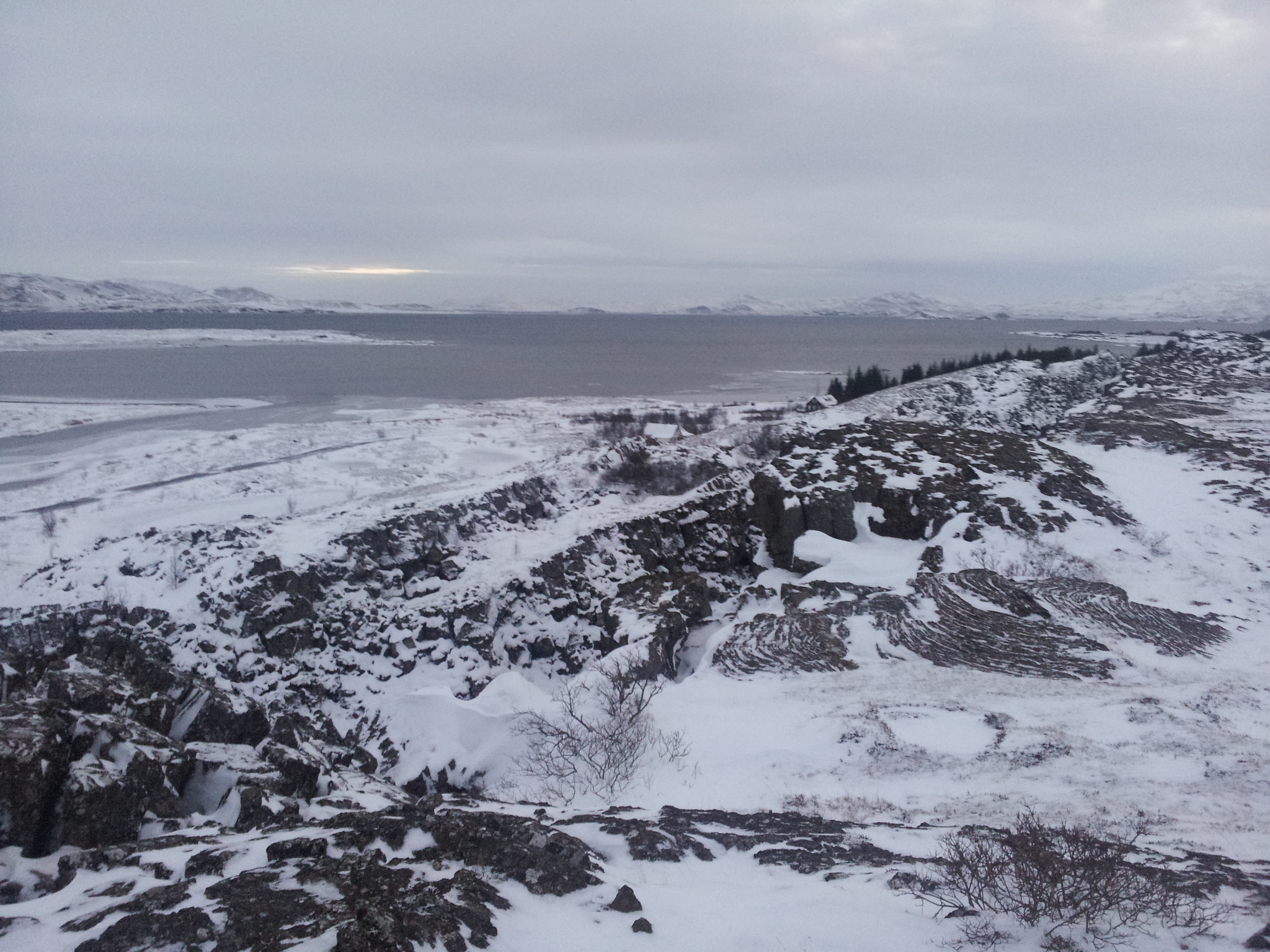
Þingvallavatn

A rift valley is a linear shaped lowland between several highlands or mountain ranges produced by the action of a geologic rift. Rifts are formed as a result of the pulling apart of the lithosphere due to extensional tectonics. The linear depression may subsequently be further deepened by the forces of erosion. More generally the valley is likely to be filled with sedimentary deposits derived from the rift flanks and the surrounding areas. In many cases rift lakes are formed. One of the best known examples of this process is the East African Rift. On Earth, rifts can occur at all elevations, from the sea floor to plateaus and mountain ranges in continental crust or in oceanic crust. They are often associated with a number of adjoining subsidiary or co-extensive valleys, which are typically considered part of the principal rift valley geologically.

== Earth's rift valleys ==
The most extensive rift valley is located along the crest of the mid-ocean ridge system and is the result of sea floor spreading. Examples of this type of rift include the Mid-Atlantic Ridge and the East Pacific Rise.

Many existing continental rift valleys are the result of a failed arm (aulacogen) of a triple junction, although there are three, the East African Rift, Rio Grande rift and the Baikal Rift Zone, which are currently active, as well as a fourth which may be, the West Antarctic Rift System. In these instances, not only the crust but entire tectonic plates are in the process of breaking apart forming new plates. If they continue, continental rifts will eventually become oceanic rifts.

Other rift valleys are the result of bends or discontinuities in horizontally-moving (strike-slip) faults. When these bends or discontinuities are in the same direction as the relative motions along the fault, extension occurs. For example, for a right lateral-moving fault, a bend to the right will result in stretching and consequent subsidence in the area of the irregularity. In the view of many geologists today, the Dead Sea lies in a rift which results from a leftward discontinuity in the left lateral-moving Dead Sea Transform fault. Where a fault breaks into two strands, or two faults run close to each other, crustal extension may also occur between them, as a result of differences in their motions. Both types of fault-caused extension commonly occur on a small scale, producing such features as sag ponds or landslides.

=== Rift valley lakes ===
Many of the world's largest lakes are located in rift valleys. Lake Baikal in Siberia, a World Heritage Site, lies in an active rift valley. Baikal is both the deepest lake in the world and, with 20% of all of the liquid freshwater on earth, has the greatest volume. Lake Tanganyika, second by both measures, is in the Albertine Rift, the westernmost arm of the active East African Rift. Lake Superior in North America, the largest freshwater lake by area, lies in the ancient and dormant Midcontinent Rift. The largest subglacial lake, Lake Vostok, may also lie in an ancient rift valley. Lake Nipissing and Lake Timiskaming in Ontario and Quebec, Canada lie inside a rift valley called the Ottawa-Bonnechere Graben. Þingvallavatn, Iceland's largest natural lake, is also an example of a rift lake.

== Extraterrestrial rift valleys ==
Rift valleys are also known to occur on other terrestrial planets and natural satellites. The 4,000 km long Valles Marineris on Mars is believed by planetary geologists to be a large rift system. Some features of Venus, most notably, the 4,000 km Devana Chasma and a part of the western Eistla, and possibly also Alta and Bell Regio have been interpreted by some planetary geologists as rift valleys. Some natural satellites also have prominent rift valleys. The 2,000 km long Ithaca Chasma on Tethys in the Saturn system is a prominent example. Charon's Nostromo Chasma is the first confirmed in the Pluto system, however large chasms up to 950 km wide observed on Charon have also been tentatively interpreted by some as giant rifts, and similar formations have also been noted on Pluto. A recent study suggests a complex system of ancient lunar rift valleys, including Vallis Rheita and Vallis Alpes. The Uranus system also has prominent examples, with large 'chasma' believed to be giant rift valley systems, most notably the 1492 km long Messina Chasma on Titania, 622 km Kachina Chasmata on Ariel, Verona Rupes on Miranda, and Mommur Chasma on Oberon.
