= Ataksak =

Inuit deity

Ataksak is a goddess in Inuit mythology. She is the ruler of the sky, and represents the light in the world that brings joy and happiness to the people. Ataksak's appearance is often described as a "bright ball" or glowing sphere, with strings or rays or light attached. Some sources use masculine pronouns for this figure.
