= Mommur Chasma =

Canyon on Oberon

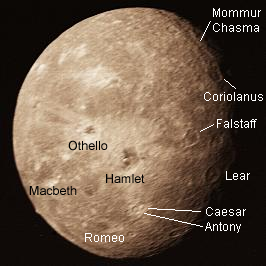
Voyager 2 image of Oberon showing Mommur Chasma near the limb at upper right.

Mommur Chasma is the largest 'canyon' on the known part of the surface of Uranus' moon Oberon. This feature probably formed during crustal extension at the early stages of moon's evolution, when the interior of Oberon expanded and its ice crust cracked as a result. The canyon is an example of graben (rift valley) or scarp produced by normal fault(s). The chasma was first imaged by Voyager 2 spacecraft in January 1986.

The Gazetteer of Planetary Nomenclature states that Mommur Chasma is named after the forest home of the fairy king Oberon in A Midsummer Night's Dream. In fact, Oberon's home is not named in Shakespeare's play; it appears instead in the French epic Huon of Bordeaux.
