= Hamlet (crater) =

Crater on Oberon

Coordinates: 46.1°S 44.4°E

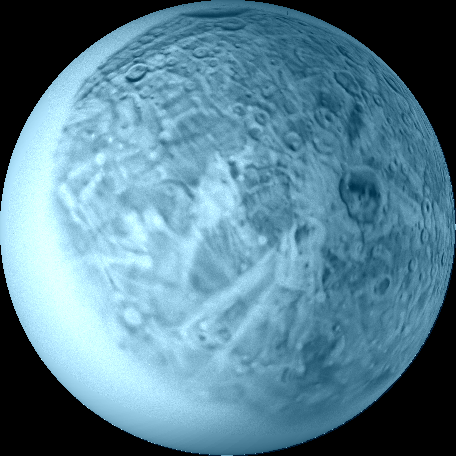
A map of Oberon. The large crater with the dark floor (right of center) is Hamlet.

Hamlet is the largest crater on the known part of the surface of Uranus' moon Oberon. It has diameter of about 206 km and is named after the title character of the play Hamlet, by William Shakespeare. The crater has a dark floor and is surrounded by a system of bright rays, which are ice ejecta deposited during the impact event. The nature of the dark material on the floor is unknown, but it may have erupted from the depth through cryovolcanism. The crater was first imaged by the Voyager 2 spacecraft in January 1986.
