= Yangoor (crater) =

Largest known impact crater on Ariel

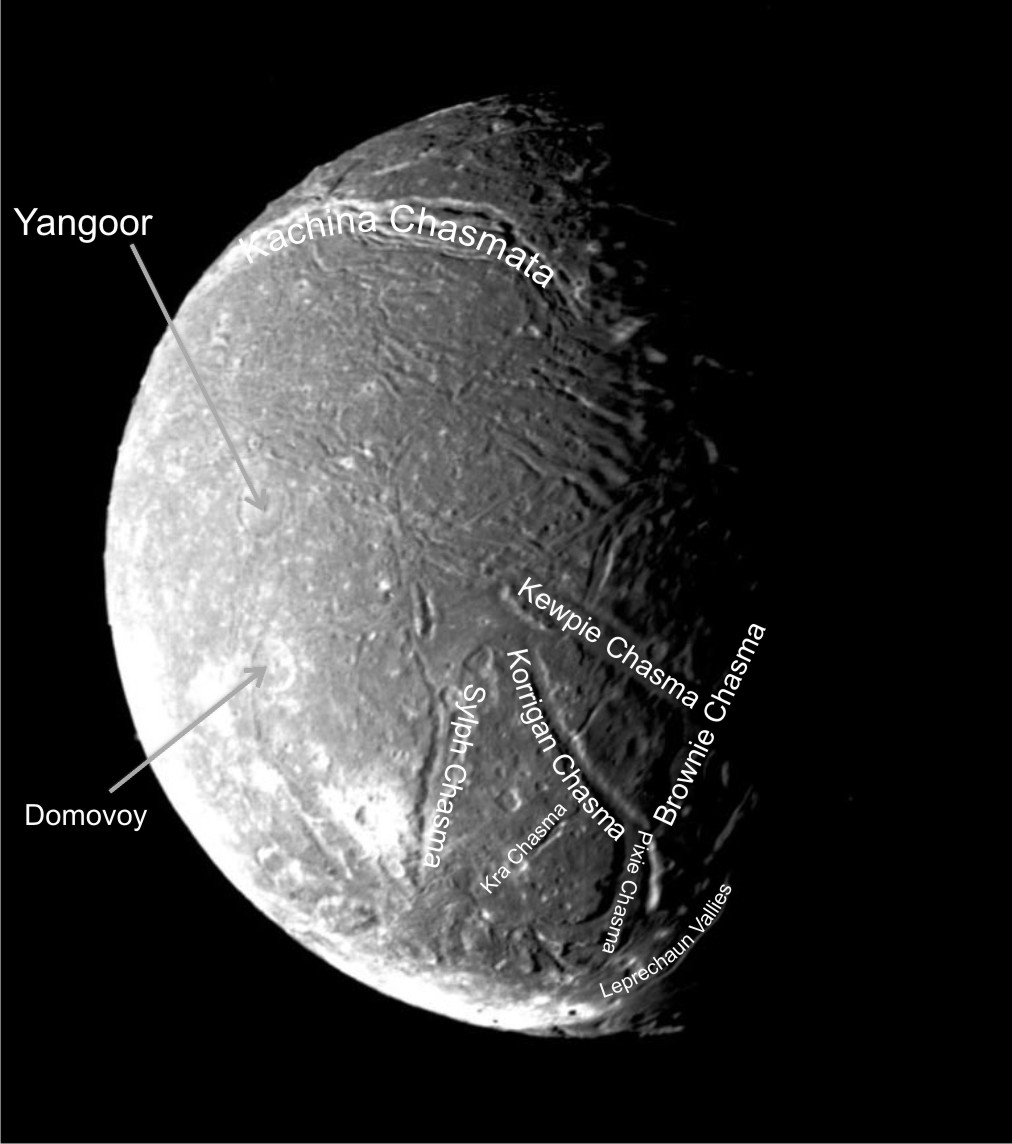
- Annotated Voyager 2 image of Ariel, with Yangoor left of center
- Feature type: Central-peak impact crater
- Location: Ariel
- Coordinates: 68.7°S 80.3°W
- Diameter: 78 kilometres (48 mi)
- Depth: ~1 kilometre (0.62 mi)
- Peak: >1 kilometre (0.62 mi) (central peak)
- Discoverer: Voyager 2
- Eponym: Spirit, Australian Aboriginal mythology

Yangoor is the largest known impact crater on the surface of the Uranian moon Ariel. A central-peak impact crater, it is about 78 kilometres (48 mi) in diameter and is located approximately 450 kilometres (280 mi) from Ariel's south pole. The northwestern edge of the crater was erased by formation of ridged terrain. The crater lacks bright ejecta deposits.

Yangoor was imaged for the first time by the Voyager 2 spacecraft in January 1986. The crater is named after a spirit that brings day in Australian Aboriginal mythology. The name Yangoor was officially approved by the International Astronomical Union in 1988.

== Characteristics ==
At roughly 78 kilometers in diameter, Yangoor is the largest Arielian crater observed by the Voyager 2 spacecraft in its 1986 flyby of Uranus and its system of moons. The crater is extremely shallow, with most of the crater floor having nearly no measurable depth. The floor of Yangoor exhibits a dichotomy: the southern floor is much deeper, with a depth of roughly 1 kilometre (3,300 ft), than the northern floor, which only has a depth of less than 200 metres (660 ft). Yangoor's crater rim and central peak, by comparison, are much more topographically prominent. The crater rim is largely intact and rises 150–500 metres (490–1,640 ft) above the surrounding terrain, whilst an elongated central peak complex extends from the center to Yangoor's western rim and rises over 1 kilometer in height.

The extreme shallowness of Yangoor is unusual and contrasts with the similarly-sized Domovoy, another Arielian crater. The expected depth for a crater of Yangoor's size is around 2.7 kilometres (1.7 mi), requiring some mechanism to reduce the depth of the crater after its formation. Astronomer A. Ruzicka proposed in 1988 that the flat portions of Yangoor represents a cryovolcanic flow burying the original crater floor. Alternatively, the flattened nature of Yangoor may indicate an era of viscous relaxation, where Ariel's crust slowly creeps and flattens out topographical features. A team of planetary scientists led by M. T. Bland modelled viscous relaxation for Yangoor in 2023, concluding that a surface heat flux of at least 30 mW/m^{2} is required to match observations. This value suggests that Ariel underwent a period of intense tidal heating; as Domovoy is not relaxed, either the period was brief, or Ariel's surface was affected unevenly.
