= Kewpie Chasma =

Feature on Ariel, the fourth largest moon of Uranus

- Feature type: Chasma
- Coordinates: 28.3°S 326.9°E
- Diameter: 467 km
- Eponym: Kewpie

The Kewpie Chasma is a chasma on the surface of Ariel, the fourth largest moon of Uranus.
