= Kachina Chasmata =

Canyon on Ariel

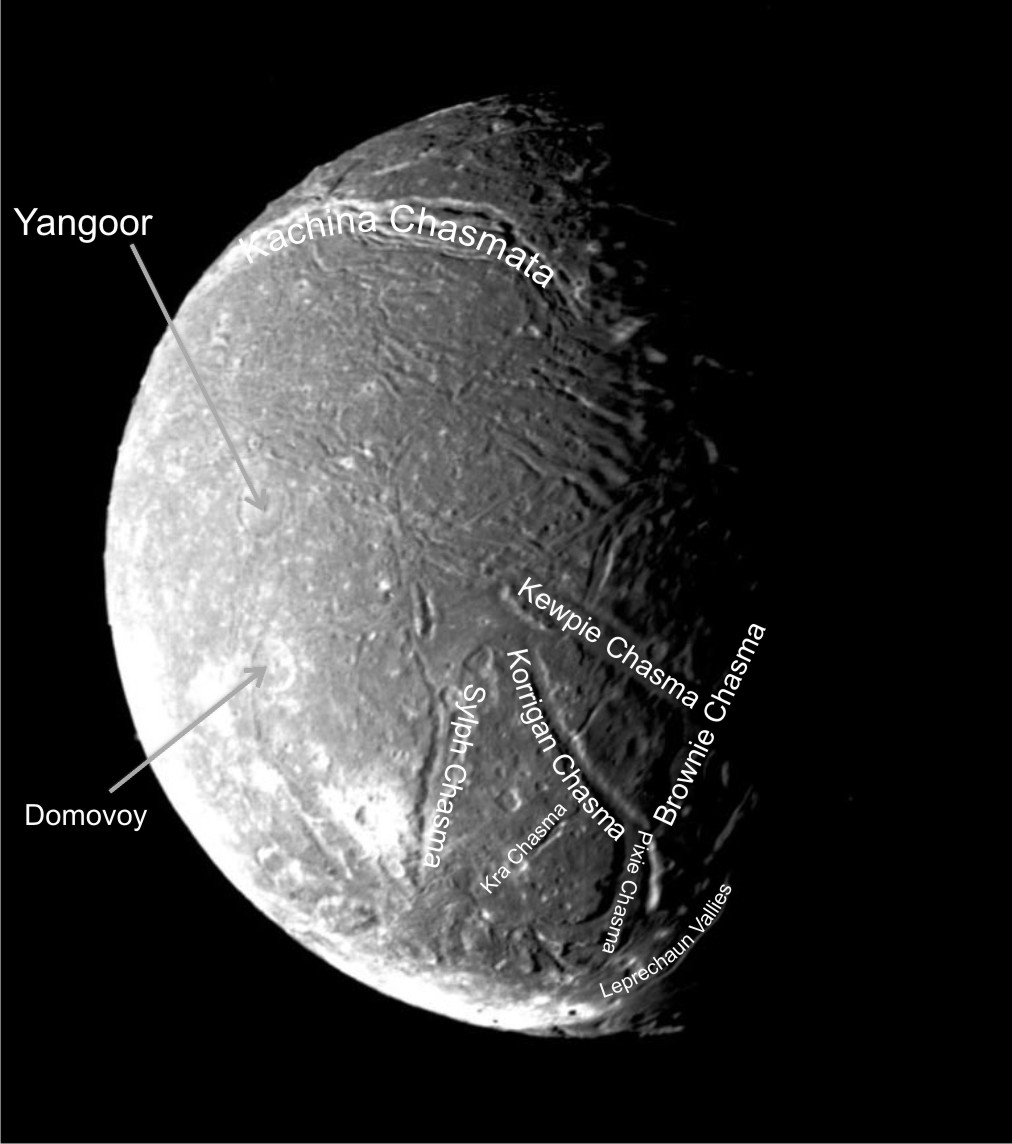
Voyager 2 image of Ariel. The Kachina Chasmata can be seen in the upper part of the image.

The Kachina Chasmata are the longest known canyon or system of canyons on the surface of the Uranian moon Ariel. The name comes from kachina, a spirit in Hopi mythology. The 622 km long and 50 km wide chasmata arise from a system of normal faults running from the north-west to the south-east. The faults bound down-dropped crustal blocks forming structures called graben. The canyons cut the cratered terrain, which means that they were formed at a relatively late stage of the moon's evolution, when the interior of Ariel expanded and its ice crust cracked as a result. The floor of the canyons is not visible on the images obtained by the Voyager 2 spacecraft in January 1986; thus, whether it is covered by smooth plains like the floors of other Arielian graben is currently unknown.

During the Voyager 2 flyby in 1986 the northern hemisphere of Ariel was not illuminated by the Sun because the spacecraft arrived during a southern solstice on Uranus. Nevertheless, because it was still illuminated by light reflected from Uranus, scientists using advanced processing methods were able to detect some details in the dark hemisphere. These analyses revealed a continuation of the Kachina Chasmata into the dark hemisphere, possibly as far as the opposite limb. As the total length of the feature appears to be 1800–2200 km, it may be comparable to Ithaca Chasma on Tethys.
