= Polydeuces (moon) =

Trojan moon of Saturn

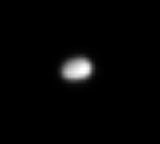
- Polydeuces imaged approximately 73,000 km (45,000 mi) away from the Cassini spacecraft on 22 May 2006

Discovery
- Discovered by: Cassini Imaging Science Team (Note: Members of the Cassini Imaging Science Team include (in alphabetical surname order): Andre Brahic, Joe Burns, Tony DelGenio, Luke Dones, Andy Ingersoll, Torrence Johnson, Alfred McEwen, Carl D. Murray, Gerhard Neukum, Carolyn Porco, Steve Squyres, Peter Thomas, Joe Veverka, and Bob West.)
- Discovery date: 21 October 2004 (date of discovery images)

Designations
- Designation: Saturn XXXIV
- Pronunciation: /ˌpɒlɪˈdjuːsiːz/
- Named after: Πολυδεύκης Polydeykēs
- Alternative names: S/2004 S 5
- Adjectives: Polydeucean /ˌpɒlɪdjuːˈsiːən/ Polydeucian /ˌpɒlɪˈdjuːsiən/

Orbital characteristics
- Epoch 1 January 2000 12:00 UT (JD 2451545.0)
- Earliest precovery date: 2 April 2004
- Semi-major axis: 377410 km
- Eccentricity: 0.019
- Orbital period (sidereal): 2.73691 d
- Average orbital speed: 10.03 km/s
- Inclination: 0.18° (Note: The mean orbital inclination is given with respect to Polydeuces's local Laplace plane. Coincidentally, the Laplace plane inclination value is close to the mean orbital inclination with respect to Saturn's equator, given as 0.1774° in Spitale et al. (2006), Table 6.)
- Satellite of: Saturn

Physical characteristics
- Dimensions: 3.50 × 3.10 × 2.62 km (± 0.40 × 0.40 × 0.40 km)
- Mean diameter: 3.06±0.40 km
- Volume: 15 km^{3} (Note: Volume calculated from Polydeuces's volume-equivalent sphere radius of 1.53±0.20 km given by Hedman et al. (2020).)
- Mass: ≈ 8×10^{12} kg (assumed; unmeasured) (Note: Mass calculated by multiplying Polydeuces's volume with its assumed density of 500 kg/m^{3} according to the formula ${M} = \rho V$.)
- Mean density: ≈ 0.5 g/cm^{3} (assumed; unmeasured)
- Surface gravity: ≈ 0.0002 m/s^{2} at longest axis to ≈ 0.0003 m/s^{2} at poles (Note: Surface gravity g is calculated from the formula $g = \frac{GM}{r^2}$, where G is the gravitational constant, M is the body's mass, and r is the body's radius (or semi-axis if nonspherical). For Polydeuces, its mass is approximately 8×10^{12} kg for an assumed density of 500 kg/m^{3}. For Polydeuces's longest semi-axis of 1.75 km, the surface gravity would be about 0.0002 m/s^{2}, while for Polydeuces's shortest (polar) semi-axis of 1.31 km, the surface gravity would be about 0.0003 m/s^{2}.)
- Escape velocity: ≈ 0.0008 km/s at longest axis to ≈ 0.0009 km/s at poles (Note: Escape velocity v_{e} is calculated from the formula $v_e = \sqrt {\frac{2GM}{r}}$, where G is the gravitational constant, M is the body's mass, and r is the body's radius (or semi-axis if nonspherical). For Polydeuces, its mass is approximately 8×10^{12} kg for an assumed density of 500 kg/m^{3}. For Polydeuces's longest semi-axis of 1.75 km, the escape velocity would be about 0.0008 km/s, while for Polydeuces's shortest (polar) semi-axis of 1.31 km, the escape velocity would be about 0.0009 km/s.)
- Synodic rotation period: assumed synchronous
- Albedo: 1.24±0.09 (geometric)

Polydeuces /ˌpɒlɪˈdjuːsiːz/, also designated Saturn XXXIV, is a small trojan moon of Saturn occupying the trailing L_{5} Lagrange point of Dione. It was discovered by the Cassini Imaging Science Team in images taken by the Cassini space probe on 21 October 2004. With a mean diameter of about 3 km (1.9 mi), Polydeuces is thought to have a smooth surface coated with fine, icy particles accumulated from the cryovolcanic plumes of Enceladus. In its orbit around Saturn, Polydeuces periodically drifts away from Dione's Lagrange point due to gravitational perturbations by other nearby moons of Saturn. Of the four known trojan moons of Saturn, Polydeuces exhibits the largest displacement from its Lagrange point.

== Discovery ==
Polydeuces was discovered by the Cassini Imaging Science Team on 24 October 2004 while routinely investigating images taken by the Cassini space probe earlier on 21 October 2004. The images were visually inspected through the blink comparison technique, which revealed any potential moons that moved relative to the background stars. The discovery images consisted of four frames taken with Cassini's wide-angle camera over less than six minutes, which showed Polydeuces moving 3–6 pixels per frame. (Note: The discovery announcement of Polydeuces in IAUC 8432 mistakenly reports that it was discovered in narrow-angle Cassini images on 21 October 2004. All Cassini images containing Polydeuces on 21 October 2004 were taken with the wide-angle camera, as reported in Murray et al. (2005), Table 1 and shown in NASA's Outer Planets Unified Search tool for archived Cassini data.) The observed motion of Polydeuces immediately suggested that it could be orbiting Saturn at the distance of one of the large moons, Dione, possibly sharing its orbit in a co-orbital configuration.

By 4 November 2004, the Cassini Imaging Science Team obtained more Cassini images of Polydeuces, including two frames taken on 2 November 2004 and another two predating the discovery images by three hours. Preliminary orbit determinations using these images confirmed that Polydeuces was a co-orbital trojan moon residing around Dione's L_{5} Lagrange point. With the aid of ephemeris predictions from Polydeuces's newly determined orbit, the Cassini Imaging Science Team was able to identify 52 pre-discovery detections of Polydeuces in Cassini's narrow-angle camera images taken between 9 April 2004 and 9 May 2004. The International Astronomical Union (IAU) announced the discovery of Polydeuces on 8 November 2004. Besides Polydeuces, Cassini has discovered five other objects orbiting Saturn in 2004: Methone, Pallene, S/2004 S 3, S/2004 S 4, and S/2004 S 6.

After the discovery announcement, Cassini was retasked to begin targeted observations of Polydeuces in January 2005 to better determine its orbit. In 2006, researchers found even earlier Cassini pre-discovery images of Polydeuces taken on 2 April 2004.

Cassini discovery images of Polydeuces on 21 October 2004

== Name ==
The name Polydeuces was approved and announced by the IAU Working Group on Planetary System Nomenclature on 21 January 2005. In Greek mythology, Polydeuces is another name for Pollux, who is the twin brother of Castor and the son of Zeus and Leda. Polydeuces is also known by its official Roman numeral designation Saturn XXXIV (34th moon of Saturn discovered) and was previously known by its provisional designation S/2004 S 5, which was given by the IAU when it announced the moon's discovery.

== Orbit ==
The trojan points are located on the L_{4} and L_{5} Lagrange points, on the orbital path of the secondary object Dione (blue), around the primary object Saturn (yellow). All of the Lagrange points are highlighted in red.

Animation of Polydeuces's librating tadpole orbit in a rotating reference frame with respect to Dione Polydeuces · Helene · Dione · Saturn

Polydeuces is an inner moon of Saturn in a co-orbital configuration with Dione, meaning they share the same orbit. Together with Dione and its other co-orbital companion Helene, Polydeuces orbits Saturn in 2.74 days at an average distance of 377,600 km (234,600 mi) from the planet's center, between the orbits of Tethys and Rhea. Due to gravitational perturbations by other nearby moons of Saturn, Polydeuces's orbital radius can vary by ±7,660 km (4,760 mi) over time. Its orbit is closely aligned with Saturn's equatorial plane with a low orbital inclination of 0.2°.

Polydeuces has a slightly elliptical orbit with an eccentricity of 0.019, which is unusually higher than Dione's eccentricity of 0.002. While Dione's eccentricity is known to result from its 1:2 mean-motion orbital resonance with Enceladus, the effects of this resonance are too weak to explain Polydeuces's relatively high eccentricity. One possible explanation is that Polydeuces has always had an eccentric orbit since its formation because its orbit has not changed much over billions of years.

Polydeuces resides around Dione's L_{5} Lagrange point trailing 60° behind Dione in its orbit, which makes Polydeuces a trojan moon of Dione. The Lagrange points are locations where the gravitational pulls of Dione and Saturn balance out, allowing for stable co-orbital configurations in Dione's trojans. Dione's other co-orbital moon, Helene, is a trojan residing around the L_{4} Lagrange point leading 60° ahead of Dione. Trojan moons are not unique to Dione; another large moon of Saturn, Tethys, also has two trojans, named Telesto and Calypso, which reside in its L_{4} and L_{5} Lagrange points, respectively.

Because of perturbations by other moons of Saturn, Polydeuces does not stay exactly 60° behind Dione; its angular distance from Dione oscillates or librates over time. Of Saturn's four known trojan moons, Polydeuces librates the farthest from its Lagrange point: its angular distance behind Dione oscillates from 33.9° to 91.4° with a period of 790.931 days (2.17 years). (Note: The angular distance minimum and maximum are calculated by adding –60° (negative because L_{5} is behind Dione) to Polydeuces's libration amplitudes of –31.41° and +26.06° given by Spitale et al. (2006)) In a rotating reference frame with respect to Dione's orbit, Polydeuces appears to travel in a looping path around Dione's L_{5} point due to its varying relative speed and radial distance from Saturn in its perturbed eccentric orbit. Polydeuces's apparent looping motion combined with its librating angular distance from Dione forms a tadpole orbit about Dione's L_{5} point.

== Origin ==
Polydeuces is thought to have formed by accreting out of leftover debris trapped in Dione's L_{5} Lagrange point, in a similar process experienced by Saturn's other trojan moons. This process likely took place at an intermediate stage of the formation of Saturn's moons, when Tethys and Dione have not finished forming and gases have become depleted in Saturn's circumplanetary disk. Mean-motion orbital resonances by other nearby moons did not appear to play a significant role in the formation of the trojan moons.

Dynamical modeling of the trojan moons' formation suggests that Tethys's and Dione's L_{4} and L_{5} Lagrange points should have started with similar amounts of material for trojan moons to form with roughly similar sizes. However, this is not the case for Dione's trojans, Helene and Polydeuces, whose masses significantly differ by more than an order of magnitude. As of yet, this mass asymmetry in Dione's L_{4} and L_{5} trojans remains unexplained.

== Physical characteristics ==
As of 2020, the most recent estimate for Polydeuces's dimensions is 3.50 km × 3.10 km × 2.62 km (2.17 mi × 1.93 mi × 1.63 mi), based on resolved Cassini imagery of the moon from 2015. These dimensions correspond to a volume-equivalent mean diameter of 3.06 km (1.90 mi) for Polydeuces. Cassini's highest-resolution images of Polydeuces from 2015 show that it has an elongated shape, with a relatively smooth limb deviating from a simple ellipsoid. Polydeuces presumably rotates synchronously with its orbital period, similar to the rest of Saturn's trojan moons.

Little is known about Polydeuces's other physical properties because it was never approached up close by Cassini or any other space mission to Saturn. Because of its very small size, Polydeuces's gravitational perturbations on the trajectory of Cassini spacecraft and other Saturnian moons are negligible, which prevents the measurement of the moon's mass and density. In spite of this, researchers assume that Polydeuces has a density 0.5 g/cm^{3}, like the other small inner moons of Saturn.

Cassini images of Polydeuces

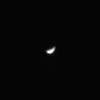
Distance approx. 44,800 km (27,800 mi), 9 May 2015

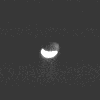
Distance approx. 34,800 km (21,600 mi), 16 June 2015. Polydeuces is illuminated by both Saturn and the Sun.

Polydeuces's small size makes it prone to disruption by impact events. Depending on the size-frequency of impactors in the Saturnian system, Polydeuces is predicted to have suffered at least one disruptive impact in the last one billion years. This implies that Polydeuces is either very young with an age of less than one billion years, or it is a primordial moon that has consistently reaccreted from each disruptive impact over the Saturnian system's 4.5 billion-year lifespan.

Polydeuces has a bright and likely smooth surface due to the accumulation of fine water ice particles from the surrounding E Ring, which is generated by the cryovolcanic plumes of Enceladus. Because of its small size, any craters on Polydeuces would be completely buried in E Ring material, giving it a craterless appearance resembling Methone or Pallene. Its geometric albedo is unknown since it has never been observed at low phase angles. Cassini imagery shows that Polydeuces has a uniform surface brightness across its leading and trailing hemispheres. Its surface is about as bright as Dione's but darker than Helene's. The trojan moons of Tethys exhibit a similar difference in surface brightness, where Calypso is brighter than Telesto and Tethys. The reason for these brightness asymmetries in the trojan moons of Dione and Tethys remains unknown; possible explanations include an asymmetric distribution of E Ring particles or recent impacts that brightened Helene and Calypso.

== Exploration ==
Cassini is the only space mission to Saturn that has made targeted observations of Polydeuces. Over the 13-year span of Cassini's mission in orbit around Saturn, the spacecraft has made 22 close approaches within 130,000 km (81,000 mi) of Polydeuces. Cassini's closest encounter with Polydeuces took place on 17 February 2005, when it passed 6,446.7 km (4,005.8 mi) from Polydeuces while moving outbound from periapse. However, Cassini did not take any images of Polydeuces on that date. The only encounters where Cassini has taken resolved images of Polydeuces were on 22 May 2006, 10 May 2015, and 16 June 2015, at closest approach distances of 64,089.9 km (39,823.6 mi), 33,997.8 km (21,125.3 mi), and 34,794.3 km (21,620.2 mi), respectively. (Note: Hedman et al. (2020) list all resolved Cassini observations of Polydeuces in Table 7, but they only give the image IDs of these observations. Inputting these image IDs into NASA's Outer Planets Unified Search query form shows the date on which these images were taken.) Cassini's two close encounters in 2015 provided the first images where Polydeuces was larger than 10 pixels across.

== See also ==
- Telesto and Calypso, trojan moons of Tethys at its L_{4} and L_{5} Lagrange points, respectively
- Janus and Epimetheus, two inner moons of Saturn in a co-orbital exchange orbit with each other
