= Polydeuces =

Polydeuces may refer to:

- Polydeuces, a moon of Saturn
- Polydeuces, pupil and eromenos of philanthropic magnate Herodes Atticus
- An alternative name for the Greek mythological hero Pollux
