= Dione (moon) =

Moon of Saturn

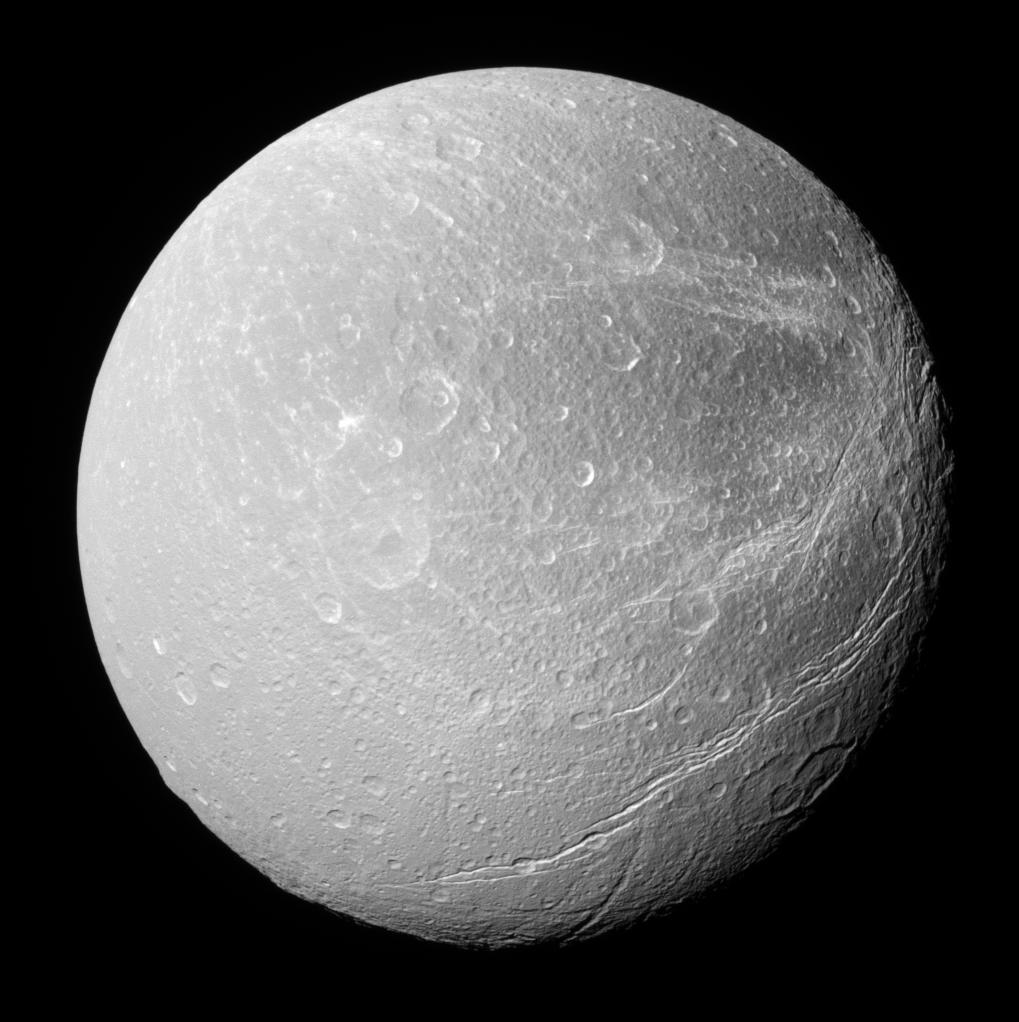
- Dione photographed by the Cassini spacecraft in 2008

Discovery
- Discovered by: Giovanni Cassini
- Discovery date: 30 March 1684

Designations
- Designation: Saturn IV
- Pronunciation: /daɪˈoʊniː/
- Named after: Διώνη Diōnē
- Adjectives: Dionean /daɪəˈniːən/

Orbital characteristics
- Periapsis: 376900 km
- Apoapsis: 378500 km
- Semi-major axis: 377700 km
- Eccentricity: 0.0022
- Orbital period (sidereal): 2.736916 d
- Inclination: 0.028° (to Saturn's equator)
- Satellite of: Saturn

Physical characteristics
- Dimensions: 1126.92 × 1122.54 × 1118.96 km (Note: Using the mean radius of 561.4±0.4 km from Thomas (2010), Nimmo et al. (2011) obtained a − r = 2.06±0.25 km, b − r = −0.13±0.25 km, and c − r = −1.92±0.31 km, where r is the mean radius, and a, b, and c are the semi-axes of the triaxial ellipsoid. The uncertainties are 2σ, excluding the mean radius which is 1σ. The three full axes of the triaxial ellipsoid are calculated from this information.)
- Mean radius: 561.4±0.4 km
- Surface area: (3.961±0.006)×10^{6} km^{2}
- Volume: (7.41±0.02)×10^{8} km^{3}
- Mass: (1.0954868±0.0000246)×10^{21} kg (1.834×10^{−4} Earths)
- Mean density: 1.4781±0.0032 g/cm^{3}
- Surface gravity: 22.8–23.1 cm/s^{2}
- Moment of inertia factor: 0.33
- Escape velocity: 0.51 km/s
- Synodic rotation period: 2.736916 d (synchronous)
- Axial tilt: 0°
- Albedo: 0.998±0.004 (geometric); 0.43±0.04 (bolometric Bond)
- Temperature: 87 K (−186°C)
- Apparent magnitude: 10.4

Dione (/daɪˈoʊni/) is the fourth-largest moon of Saturn. With a mean diameter of 1,123 km and a density of about 1.48 g/cm^{3}, Dione is composed of an icy mantle and crust overlying a silicate rocky core, with rock and water ice roughly equal in mass. Its trailing hemisphere is marked by large cliffs and scarps called chasmata; the trailing hemisphere is also significantly darker compared to the leading hemisphere.

The moon was discovered by Italian astronomer Giovanni Domenico Cassini in 1684 and is named after the Titaness Dione in Greek mythology. Dione was first imaged up-close by the Voyager 1 space probe in 1980. Later, the Cassini spacecraft made multiple flybys of Dione throughout the 2000s and 2010s as part of its campaign to explore the Saturn system.

== Name ==
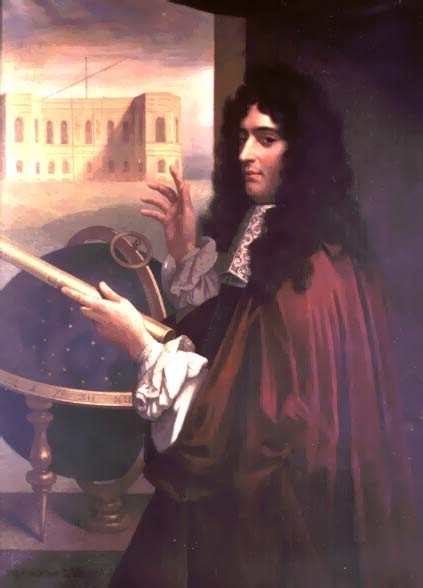
Giovanni Domenico Cassini, discoverer of Dione

Giovanni Domenico Cassini named the four moons he discovered (Tethys, Dione, Rhea, and Iapetus) Sidera Lodoicea ("the stars of Louis") to honor king Louis XIV. Cassini found Dione in 1684 using a large aerial telescope he set up on the grounds of the Paris Observatory. The satellites of Saturn were not named until 1847, when William Herschel's son John Herschel published Results of Astronomical Observations made at the Cape of Good Hope, suggesting that the names of the Titans (sisters and brothers of Cronus) be used.

Planetary moons other than Earth's were never given symbols in the astronomical literature. Denis Moskowitz, a software engineer who designed most of the dwarf planet symbols, proposed a Greek delta (the initial of Dione) combined with the crook of the Saturn symbol as the symbol of Dione. This symbol is not widely used.

== Orbit ==
Animation of Helene's orbit relative to Saturn and Dione Polydeuces · Helene · Dione · Saturn

Dione orbits Saturn with a semimajor axis about 2% less than that of Earth's Moon. However, reflecting Saturn's greater mass (95 times that of Earth), Dione's orbital period is one tenth that of Earth's Moon. Dione is currently in a 1:2 mean-motion orbital resonance with moon Enceladus, completing one orbit of Saturn for every two orbits completed by Enceladus. This resonance maintains Enceladus's orbital eccentricity (0.0047), providing a source of heat for Enceladus's extensive geological activity, which shows up most dramatically in its cryovolcanic geyser-like jets. The resonance also maintains a smaller eccentricity in Dione's orbit (0.0022), tidally heating it as well.

=== Trojans ===
Dione has two co-orbital, or trojan, moons, Helene and Polydeuces. They are located within Dione's Lagrangian points L_{4} and L_{5}, 60 degrees ahead of and behind Dione respectively. A leading co-orbital moon twelve degrees ahead of Helene was reported by Stephen P. Synnott in 1982.

Dione trojans
Name	Diameter (km)	Semi-major axis (km)	Mass (kg)	Discovery date
Dione	1 122	377 396	(1. 096 ± 0.000 0246) × 10^{21}	30 March 1684
Helene	36.2 ± 0.4	377 600	(7.1 ±0.2) × 10^{15}	1 March 1980
Polydeuces	3.06 ± 0.40	377 600	≈8 × 10^{12}	21 October 2004

== Physical characteristics ==
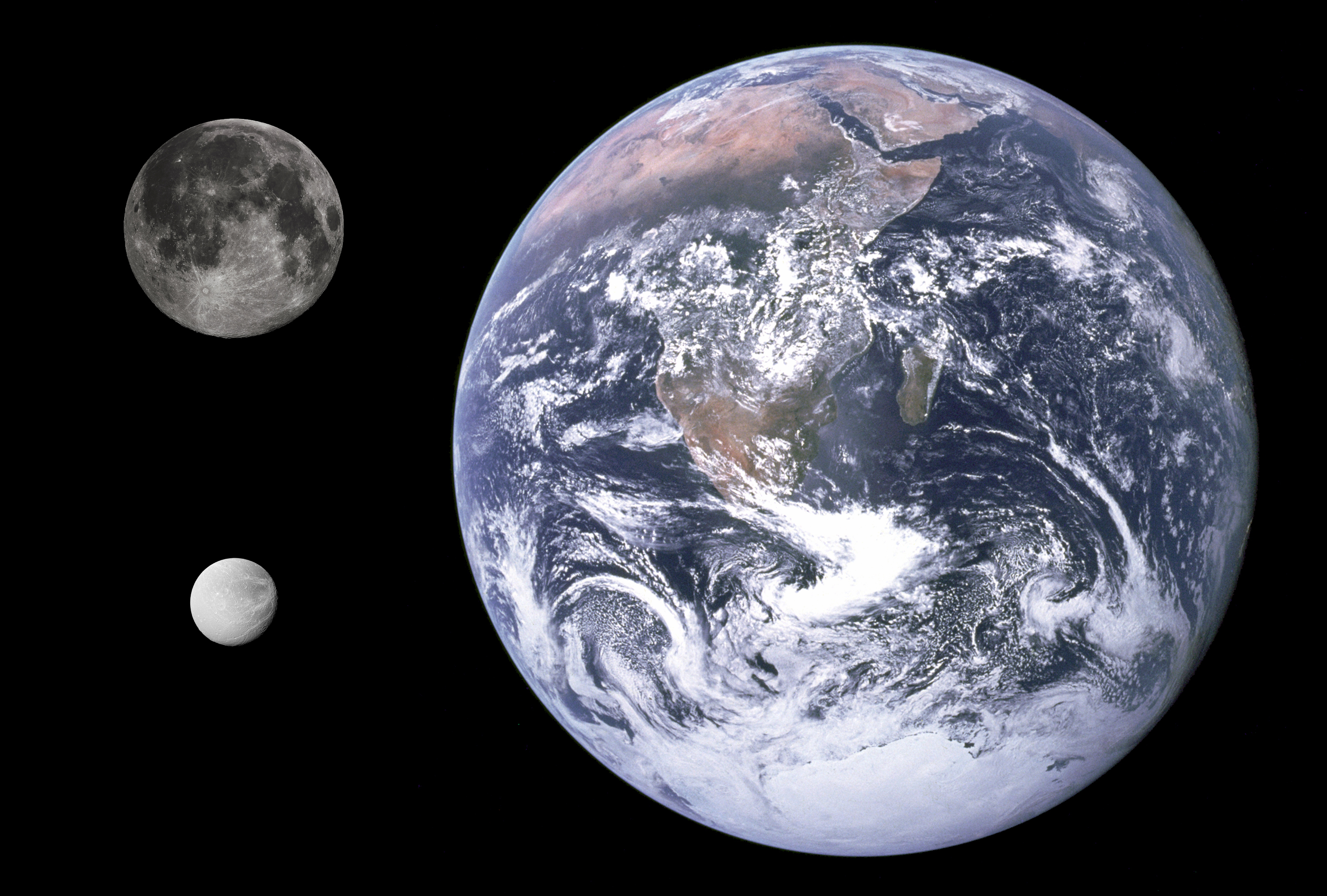
Size comparison of Earth, the Moon, and Dione.

At 1,122 km (697 mi) in diameter, Dione is the 15th largest moon in the Solar System, and is more massive than all known moons smaller than itself combined. It is also Saturn's fourth-largest moon. Based on its density, Dione's interior is likely a combination of silicate rock and water ice in nearly equal parts by mass.

Shape and gravity observations collected by Cassini suggest a roughly 400 km radius rocky core surrounded by a roughly 160 km envelope of H_{2}O, mainly in the form of water ice, but with some models suggesting that the lowermost part of this layer could be in the form of an internal liquid salt water ocean (a situation similar to that of its orbital resonance partner, Enceladus). Downward bending of the surface associated with the 1.5 km high ridge Janiculum Dorsa can most easily be explained by the presence of such an ocean. Neither moon has a shape close to hydrostatic equilibrium; the deviations are maintained by isostasy. Dione's ice shell is thought to vary in thickness by less than 5%, with the thinnest areas at the poles, where tidal heating of the crust is greatest.

=== Surface features ===
Though somewhat smaller and denser, Dione is otherwise very similar to Rhea. They both have similar albedo features and varied terrain, and both have dissimilar leading and trailing hemispheres. Dione's leading hemisphere is heavily cratered and is uniformly bright. Its trailing hemisphere, however, contains an unusual and distinctive surface feature: a network of bright ice cliffs.

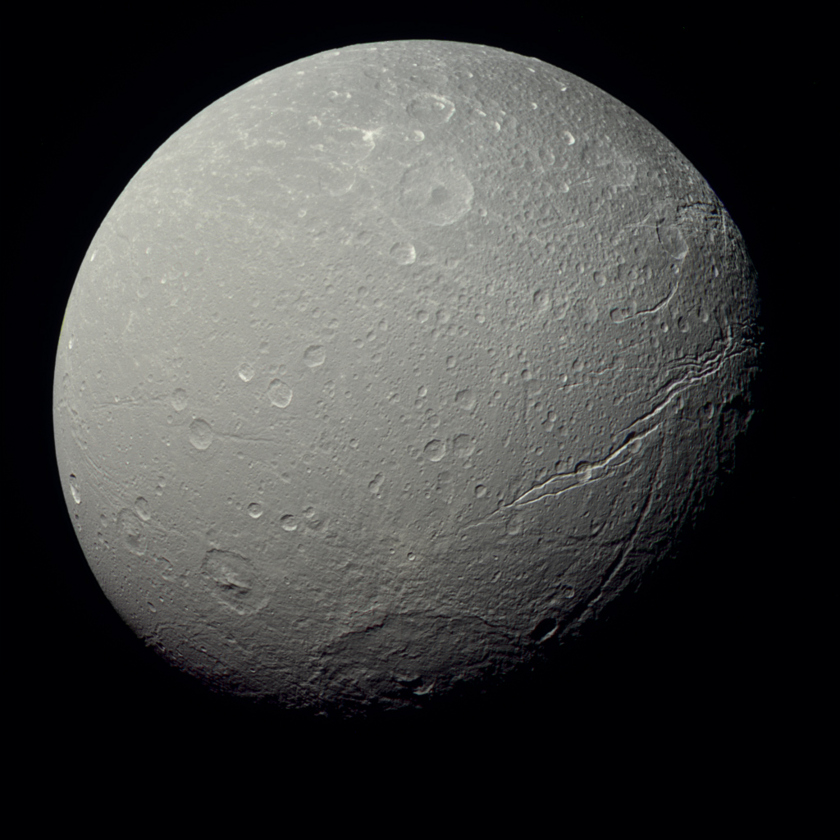
Dione in true color.

Scientists recognise Dionean geological features of the following types:

- Chasmata (chasms; long, deep, steep-sided depressions or canyons)
- Dorsa (ridges)
- Fossae (long narrow depressions)
- Craters (circular depressions made by the impact of other bodies)
- Catenae (crater chains)

==== Ice cliffs (formerly 'wispy terrain') ====
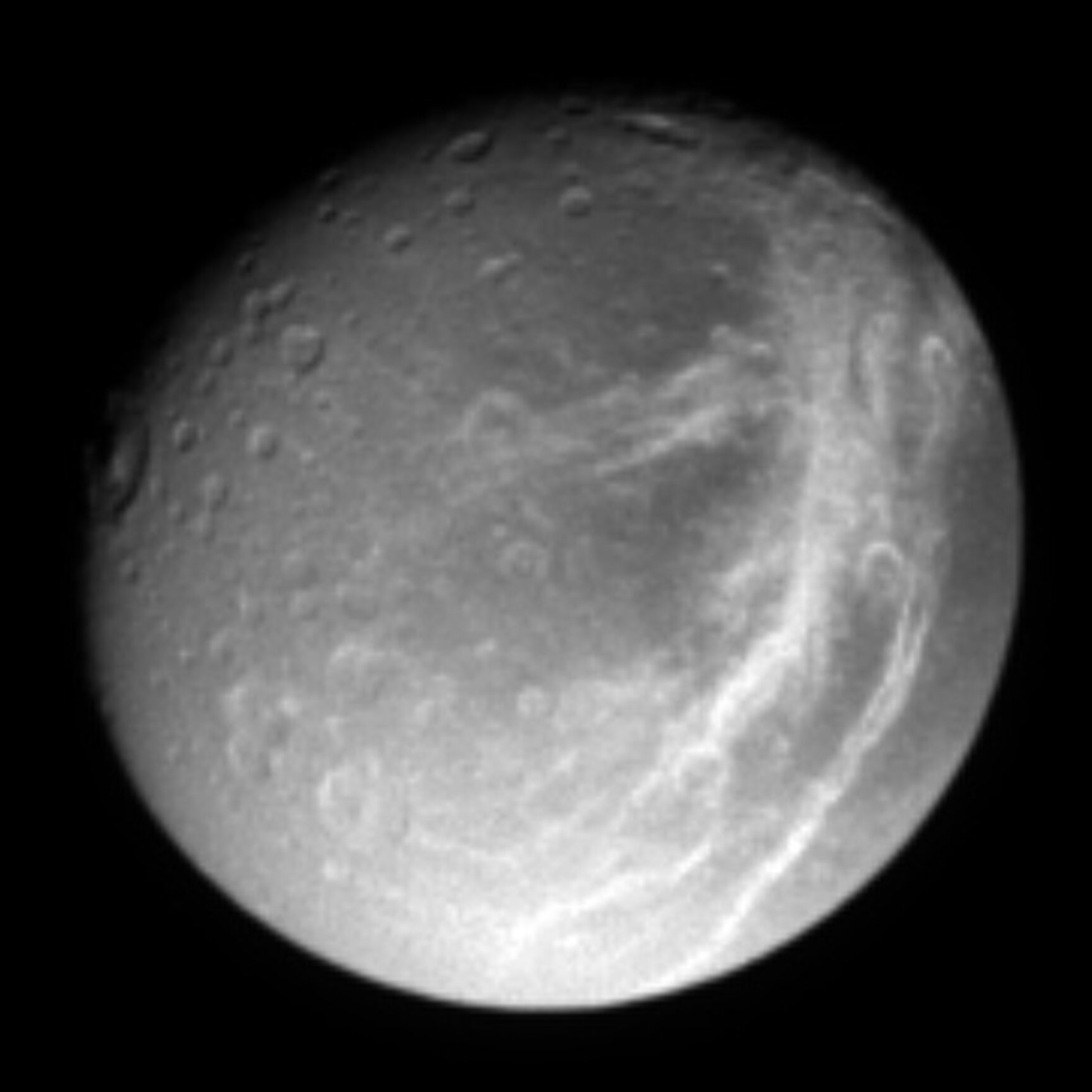
The wispy terrain on Dione's trailing hemisphere.

When the Voyager space probe photographed Dione in 1980, it showed what appeared to be wispy features covering its trailing hemisphere. The origin of these features was mysterious, because all that was known was that the material has a high albedo and is thin enough that it does not obscure the surface features underneath. One hypothesis was that shortly after its formation Dione was geologically active, and some process such as cryovolcanism resurfaced much of its surface, with the streaks forming from eruptions along cracks in the Dionean surface that fell back as snow or ash. Later, after the internal activity and resurfacing ceased, cratering continued primarily on the leading hemisphere and wiped out the streak patterns there.

This hypothesis was proven wrong by the Cassini probe flyby of 13 December 2004, which produced close-up images. These revealed that the 'wisps' were, in fact, not ice deposits at all, but rather bright ice cliffs created by tectonic fractures (chasmata). Dione has been revealed as a world riven by enormous fractures on its trailing hemisphere.

The Cassini orbiter performed a closer flyby of Dione at 500 km (310 mi) on 11 October 2005, and captured oblique images of the cliffs, showing that some of them are several hundred metres high.

==== Linear features ====
Dione features linear 'virgae' that are up to hundreds of km long but less than 5 km wide. These lines run parallel to the equator and are only apparent at lower latitudes (at less than 45° north or south); similar features are noted on Rhea. They are brighter than everything around them and appear to overlay other features such as ridges and craters, indicating they are relatively young. It has been proposed that these lines are of exogenic origin, as the result of the emplacement of material across the surface by low‐velocity impacts of material sourced from Saturn's rings, co‐orbital moons, or closely approaching comets.

==== Craters ====
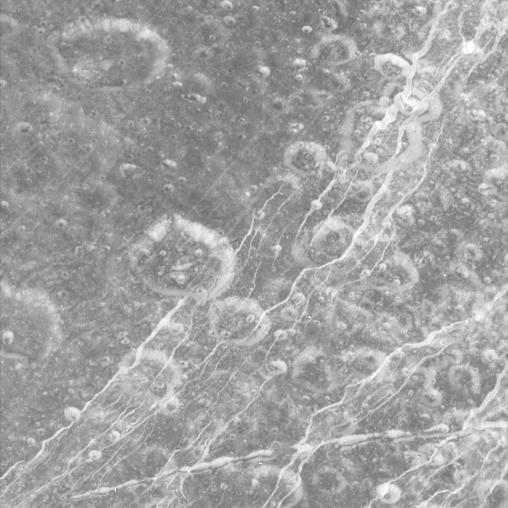
Fractures bisecting older craters on Dione. Those running from upper right to lower left are the Carthage Fossae, whereas Pactolus Catena runs more horizontally at lower right.

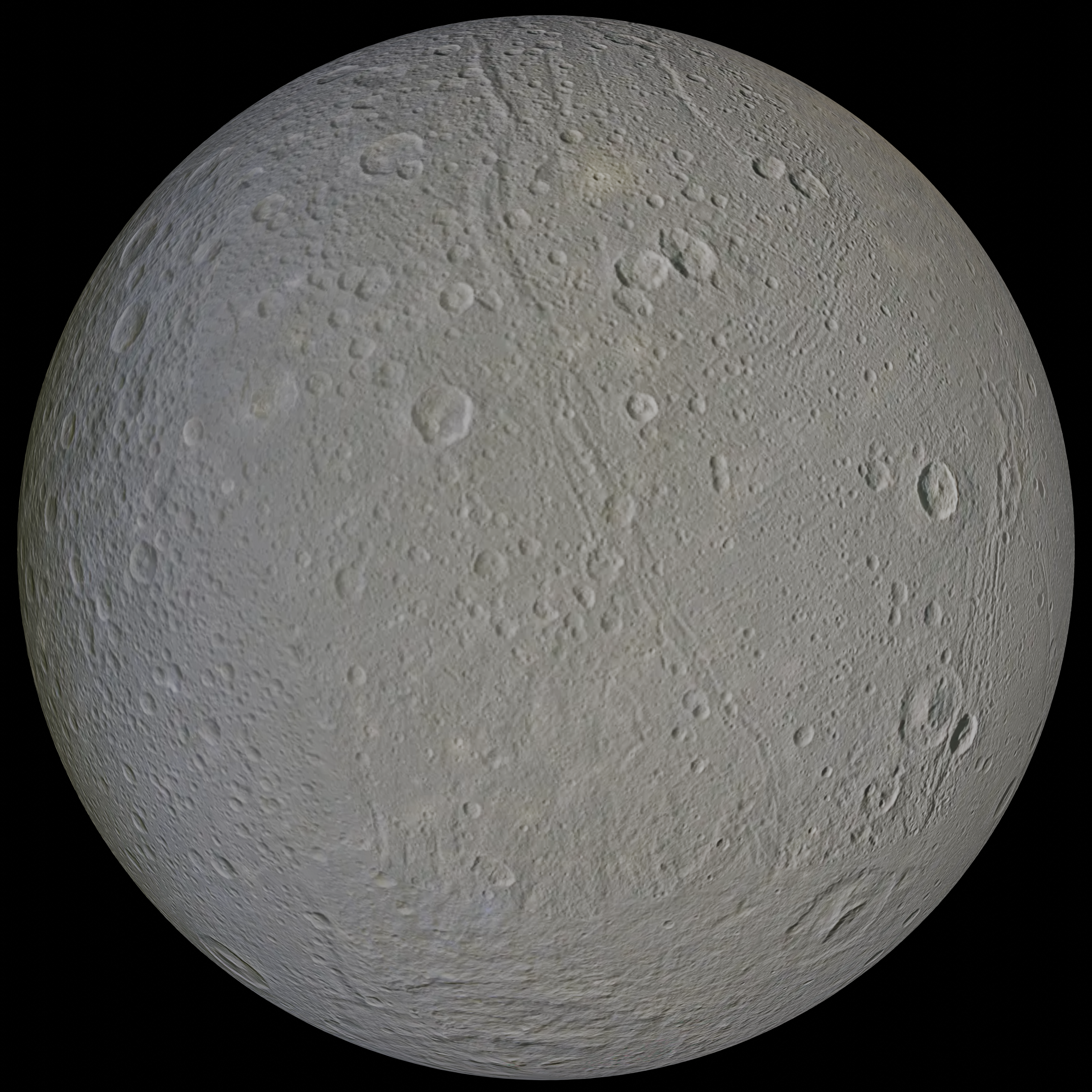
Leading side of Dione in Enhanced color.

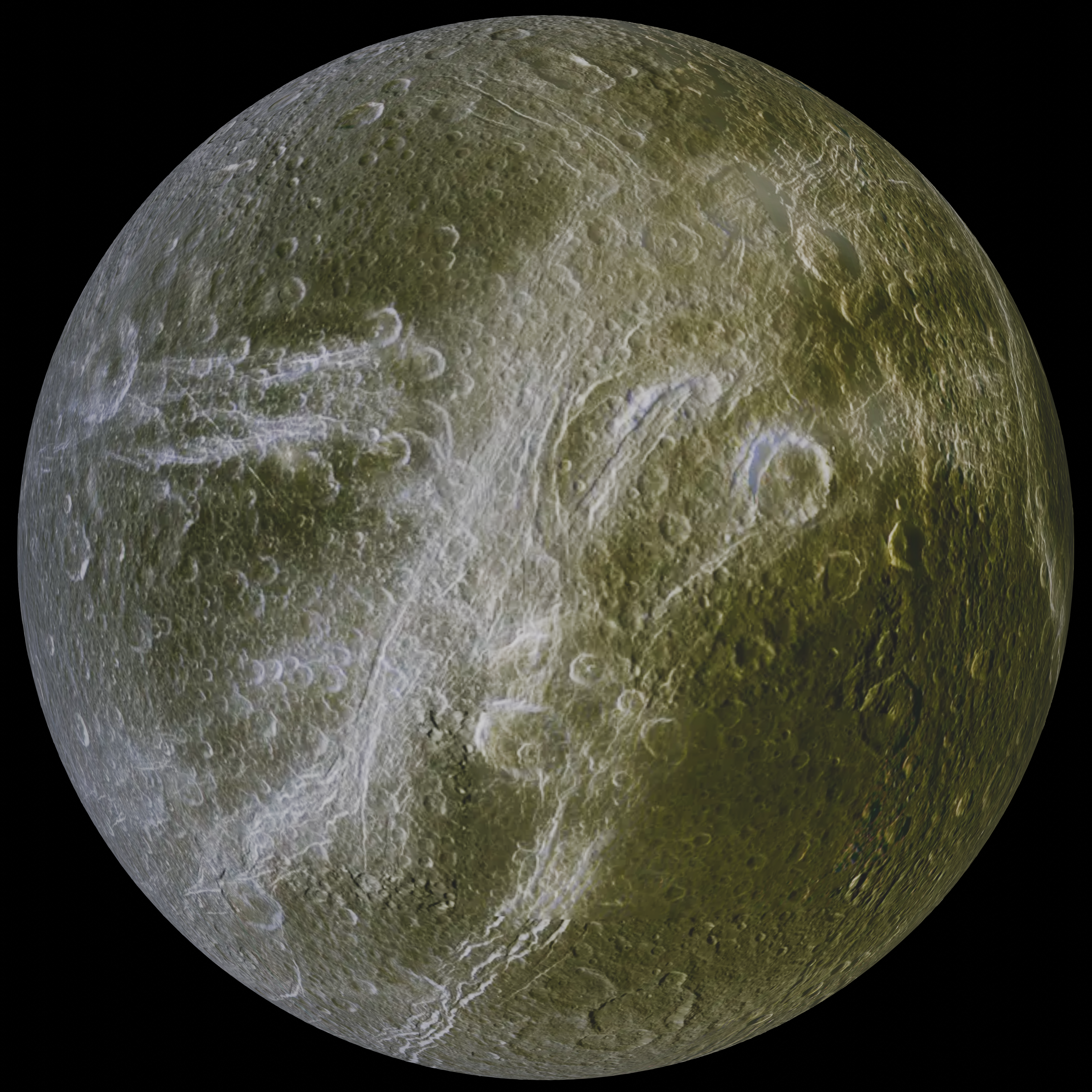
Trailing side of Dione in Enhanced color.

Dione's icy surface includes heavily cratered terrain, moderately cratered plains, lightly cratered plains, and areas of tectonic fractures. The heavily cratered terrain has numerous craters greater than 100 kilometres (62 mi) in diameter. The plains areas tend to have craters less than 30 kilometres (19 mi) in diameter. Some of the plains are more heavily cratered than others. Much of the heavily cratered terrain is located on the trailing hemisphere, with the less cratered plains areas present on the leading hemisphere. This is the opposite of what some scientists expected; Shoemaker and Wolfe proposed a cratering model for a tidally locked satellite with the highest cratering rates on the leading hemisphere and the lowest on the trailing hemisphere. This suggests that during the period of heavy bombardment, Dione was tidally locked to Saturn in the opposite orientation. Because Dione is relatively small, an impact causing a 35 kilometer crater could have spun the satellite. Because there are many craters larger than 35 kilometres (22 mi), Dione could have been repeatedly spun during its early heavy bombardment. The pattern of cratering since then and the bright albedo of the leading side suggests that Dione has remained in its current orientation for several billion years.

Like Callisto, Dione's craters lack the high-relief features seen on the Moon and Mercury; this is probably due to slumping of the weak icy crust over geologic time.

=== Atmosphere ===
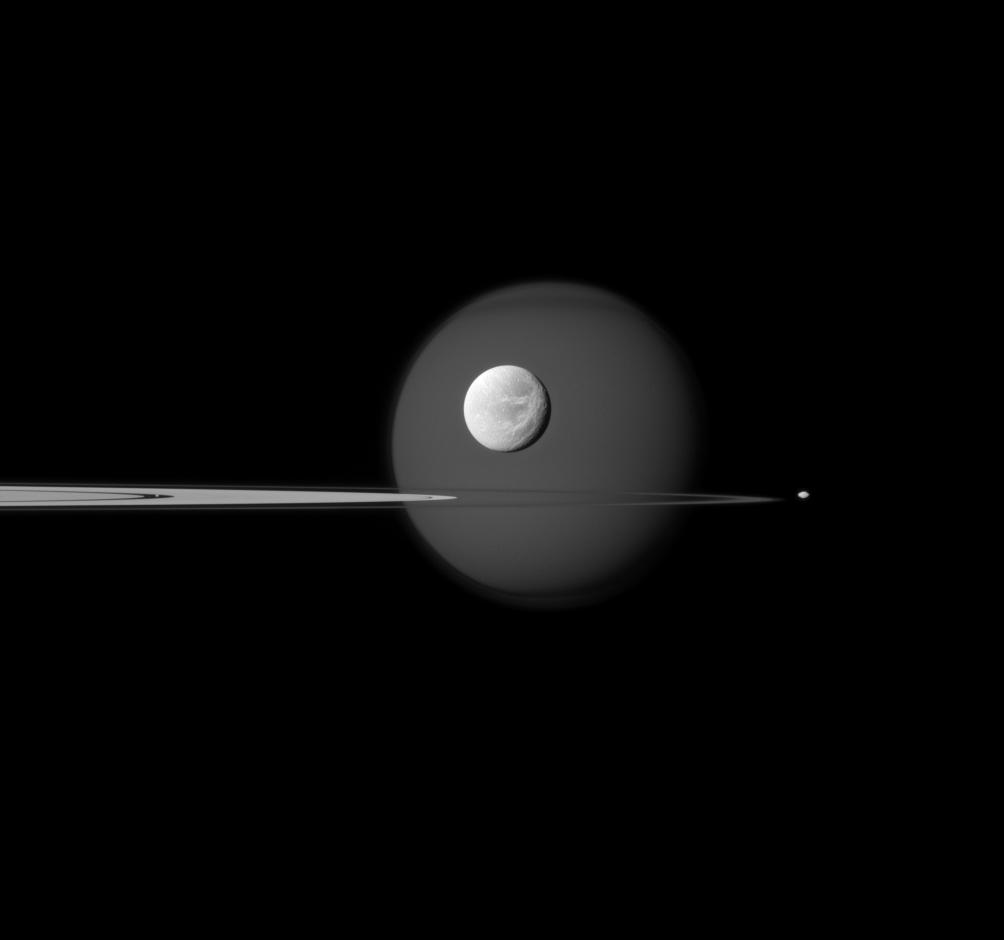
Four of Saturn's moons: Titan, in the background; Dione, above the rings; Pandora, beyond the rings on the right of the image; and Pan in the Encke Gap of the A ring on the left of the image.

On 7 April 2010, instruments on board the uncrewed Cassini probe, which flew by Dione, detected a thin layer of molecular oxygen ions (O^{+}_{2}) around Dione, so thin that scientists prefer to call it an exosphere rather than a tenuous atmosphere. The density of molecular oxygen ions determined from the Cassini plasma spectrometer data ranges from 0.01 to 0.09 per cm^{3}.

The Cassini probe instruments were unable to directly detect water from the exosphere due to high background levels, but it seems that highly charged particles from the planet's powerful radiation belts could split the water in the ice into hydrogen and oxygen.

== Exploration ==
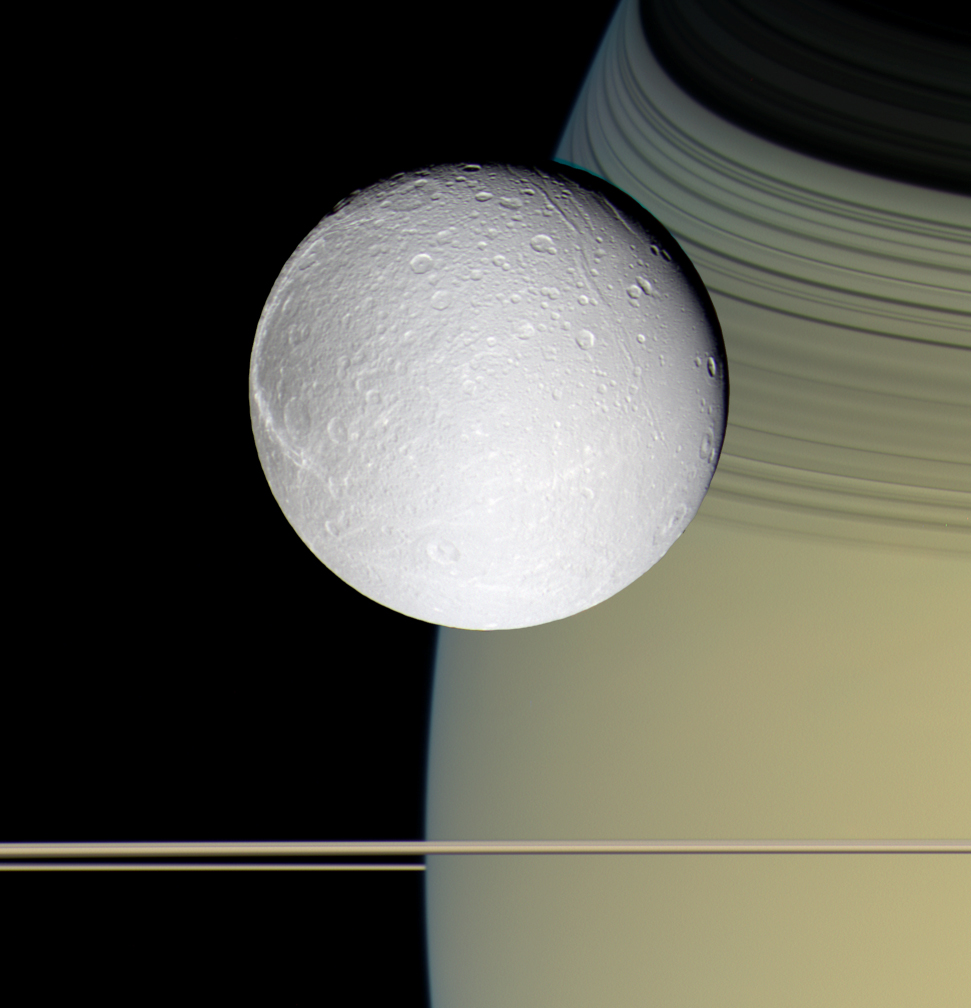
Picture of Dione in front of Saturn, captured by the Cassini orbiter

Dione was first imaged by the Voyager space probes. It has also been probed five times from close distances by the Cassini orbiter. There was a close targeted flyby at a distance of 500 km (310 mi) on 11 October 2005; another flyby was performed on 7 April 2010, also at a distance of 500 km. A third flyby was performed on 12 December 2011 at a distance of 99 km (62 mi). The following flyby was on 16 June 2015 at a distance of 516 km (321 mi), and the last Cassini flyby was performed on 17 August 2015 at a distance of 474 km (295 mi).

In May 2013, it was announced that NASA's spacecraft Cassini had provided scientists with evidence that Dione is more active than previously realized. Using topographic data, NASA teams deduced that crustal depression associated with a prominent mountain ridge on the leading hemisphere is best explained if there was a global subsurface liquid ocean like that of Enceladus. The ridge Janiculum Dorsa has a height of 1 to 2 km (0.62 to 1.24 mi); Dione's crust seems to pucker 0.5 km (0.31 mi) under it, suggesting that the icy crust was warm when the ridge formed, probably due to the presence of a subsurface liquid ocean, which increases tidal flexing.

== See also ==
- Former classification of planets
- Helene – moon at Dione's leading Lagrange point, L_{4}
- Polydeuces – moon at Dione's trailing Lagrange point, L_{5}
