= Helene (moon) =

Trojan moon of Saturn

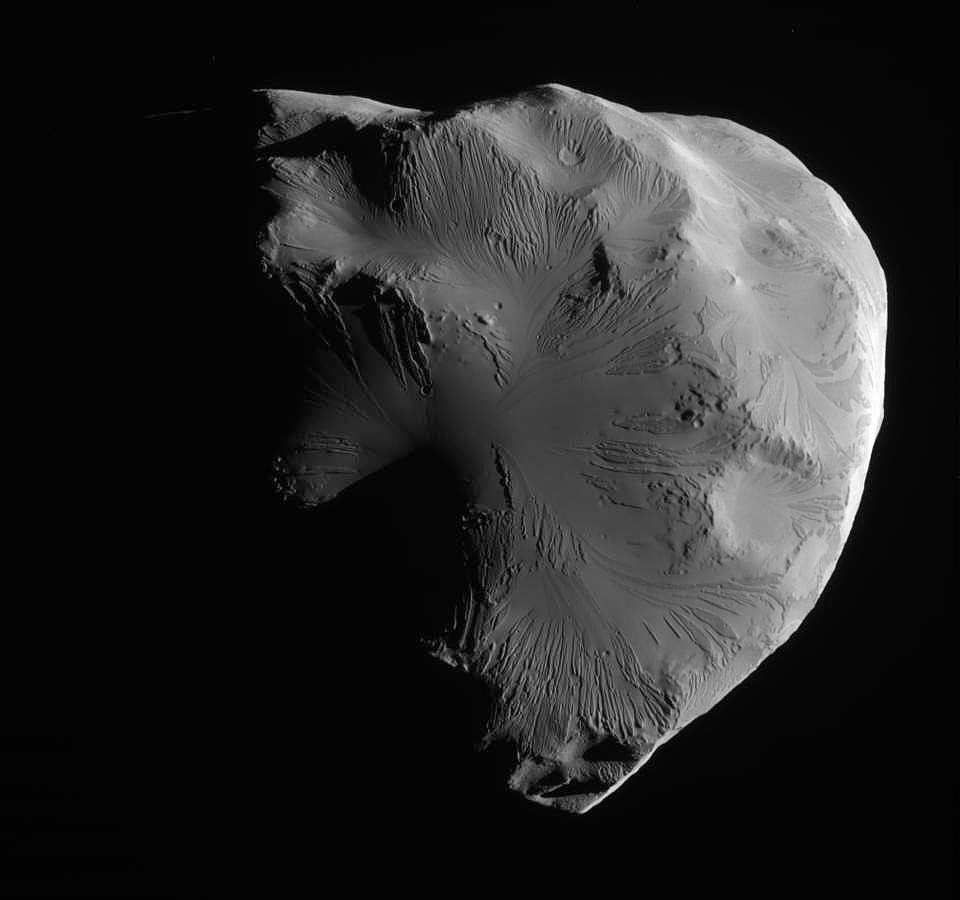
- High-resolution view of leading hemisphere, showing gullies and apparent dust (regolith) flows (Cassini, June 2011)

Discovery
- Discovered by: P. Laques; J. Lecacheux
- Discovery site: Pic du Midi Observatory
- Discovery date: March 1, 1980

Designations
- Designation: Saturn XII
- Pronunciation: /ˈhɛləniː/
- Named after: Helen of Troy (Ἑλένη Helenē)
- Alternative names: Dione B; S/1980 S 6
- Adjectives: Helenean /hɛləˈniːən/

Orbital characteristics
- Semi-major axis: 377410 km
- Eccentricity: 0.007
- Orbital period (sidereal): 2.73691 d
- Inclination: 0.21° (to Saturn's equator)
- Satellite of: Saturn

Physical characteristics
- Dimensions: 45.2 × 39.2 × 26.6 km (± 0.4 × 0.6 × 0.4 km)
- Mean diameter: 36.2±0.4 km
- Volume: 24840 km^{3} (Note: Calculated from Helene's volume-equivalent sphere radius of 18.1±0.2 km given by Thomas et al. (2020))
- Mass: (7.1±0.2)×10^{15} kg
- Mean density: 0.2926±0.0217 g/cm^{3}
- Surface gravity: 0.0009 m/s^{2} at longest axis to 0.0027 m/s^{2} at poles
- Escape velocity: 0.0065 km/s at longest axis to 0.0084 km/s at poles
- Synodic rotation period: synchronous
- Axial tilt: assumed zero
- Albedo: 1.67±0.20 (geometric); 0.25–0.70 (Bond)
Surface temp.	min	mean	max
	75 K		90–95 K

Helene /ˈhɛləniː/ is a natural satellite of Saturn. It was discovered by Pierre Laques and Jean Lecacheux in 1980 from ground-based observations at Pic du Midi Observatory, and was designated S/1980 S 6. In 1988 it was officially named after Helen of Troy, who was the granddaughter of Cronus (Saturn) in Greek mythology. Helene is also designated Saturn XII (12), which it was given in 1982, and Dione B, because it is co-orbital with Dione and located in its leading Lagrangian point (L_{4}). It is one of four known trojan moons.

Animation of Helene's orbit relative to Saturn and Dione Polydeuces · Helene · Dione · Saturn

== Exploration ==
Helene was initially observed from Earth in 1980, and Voyager flybys of Saturn in the early 1980s allowed much closer views. The Cassini–Huygens mission, which went into orbit around Saturn in 2004, provided still better views, and allowed more in-depth analysis of Helene, including views of the surface under different lighting conditions. Some of the closest images of Helene to date are from the Cassini spacecraft's 1800 km flyby on March 3, 2010, and another very successful imaging sequence occurred in June 2011. There were many other approaches over the course of the Cassini mission.

== Physical characteristics ==
Images of Helene taken by the Cassini spacecraft, with resolutions of up to 24 meters per pixel, show a landscape characterized by broad 2–10 km scale depressions with interior slopes no greater than 12°. These basins are likely the decayed remains of old impact craters.

Thin, elongated km-scale raised grooves trace the slopes of many of Helene's basins, likely representing mass flow features and indicating that the moon is undergoing active geologic processes such as mass wasting and erosion. Digital elevation models suggest that the grooves have a positive relief of between 50 and 100 meters. Helene has more than 70 craters, while it shows a bimodal appearance—the heavily cratered trailing hemisphere exhibits a crater density ten times greater than the smooth-looking leading hemisphere.

Simulation models show that the time series of surface activity on Helene is chaotic.

=== Surface material ===
Helene's surface material is of relatively high reflectance, suggesting grain sizes between 1 and 100 micrometers. Small craters appear somewhat buried, suggesting recent accretional processes of some sort.

Stress-strain laboratory testing of impact-gardened lunar regolith samples shows that at low packing densities, they behave like Non-Newtonian “Bingham” materials, i.e., having the plastic quality of candle-wax and glaciers. This observation suggests that Helene's snow-like surface material may behave as a non-Newtonian mass flow and could be primarily responsible for the visible flow patterns seen on its low-gravity surface.

== Gallery ==
Mostly raw greyscale images with near infrared or ultraviolet channels.

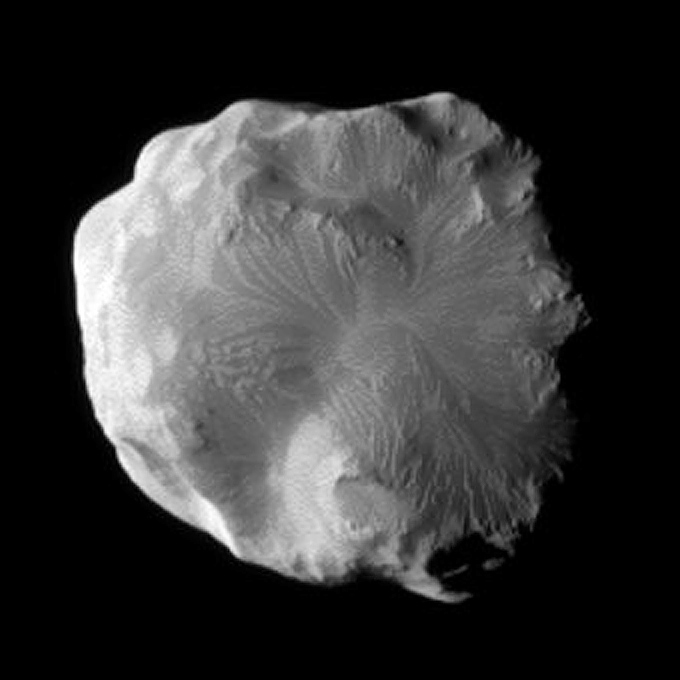
Flow-like features on Helene's leading hemisphere (Cassini, January 2011)

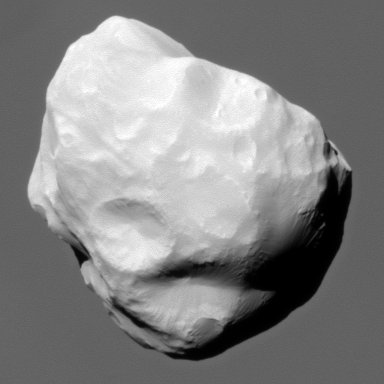
Image of Helene against the backdrop of Saturn's clouds (Cassini, March 3, 2010)

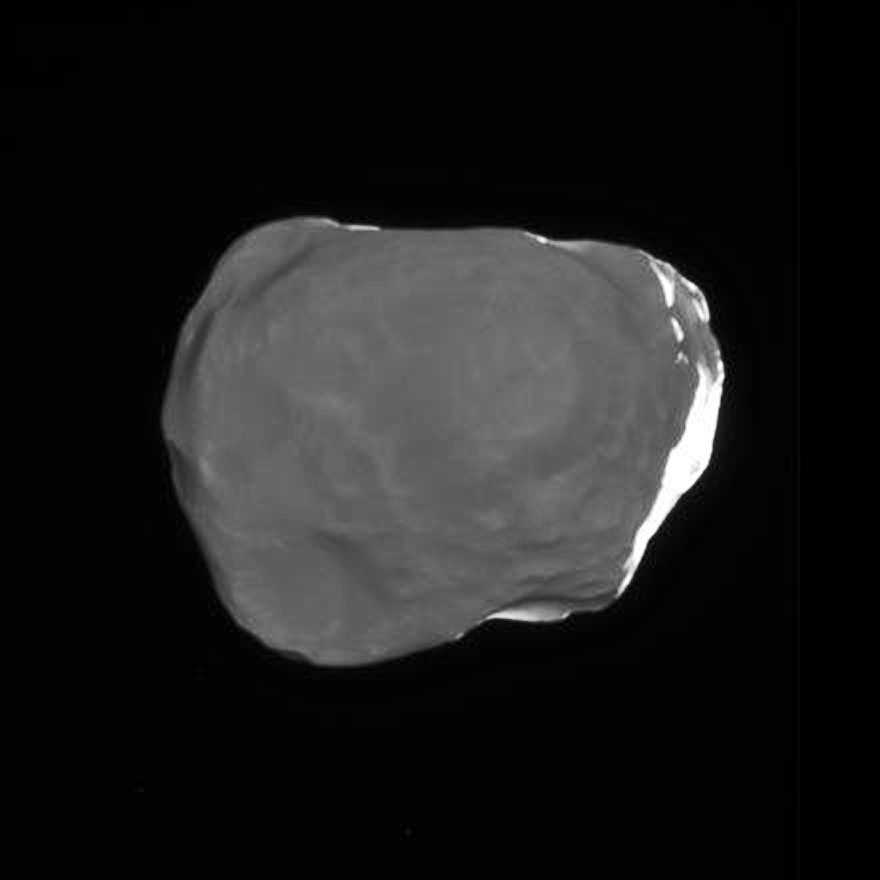
Helene's Saturn-facing side, lit by saturnshine (Cassini, March 2010)

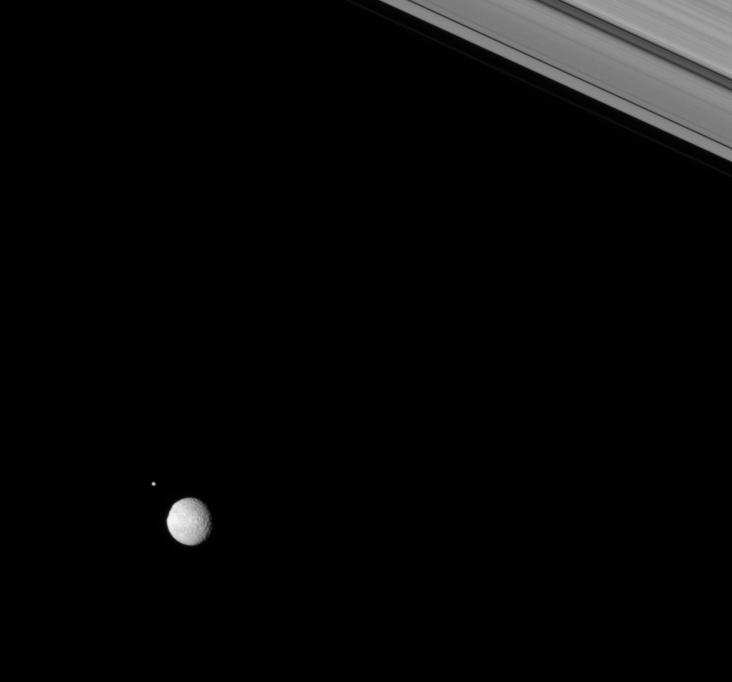
Helene and Mimas together with Saturn's rings in the corner (Cassini, February 2007)

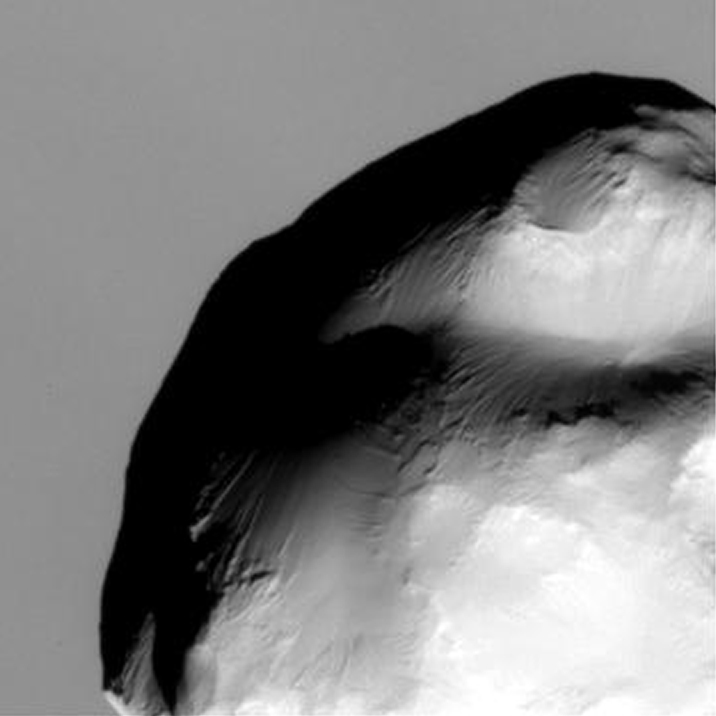
Close-up of Helene with Saturn in the background (Cassini, March 2010)

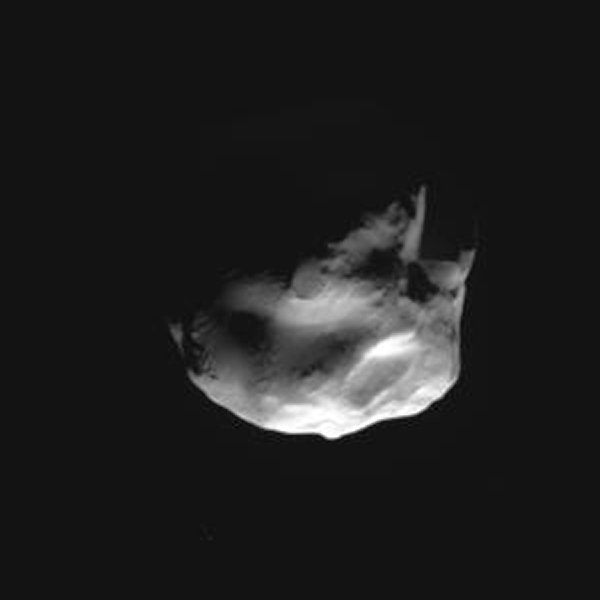
Cassini image from March 3, 2010

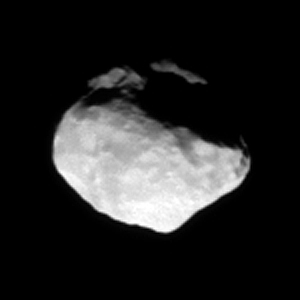
Cassini orbiter image from November 2008

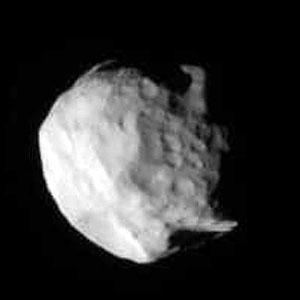
Cassini image taken July 2007

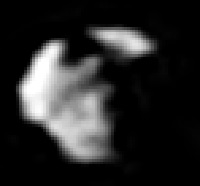
Voyager 2 image (August 1981)
