= Discovery image =

Image of just-discovered astronomical object

In astronomy, a discovery image is typically a drawing, film base photograph, photographic plate, or digital image in which a celestial object or phenomenon was first found. This can include planets, dwarf planets, small Solar System bodies (asteroids, comets, etc.) or features found on or near those objects such as ring systems or large craters.

For example, a moon of Saturn, Phoebe, was the first satellite to be discovered photographically by William Henry Pickering on March 17, 1899 from photographic plates that had been taken starting on August 16, 1898 at Arequipa, Peru by DeLisle Stewart.

== Examples ==
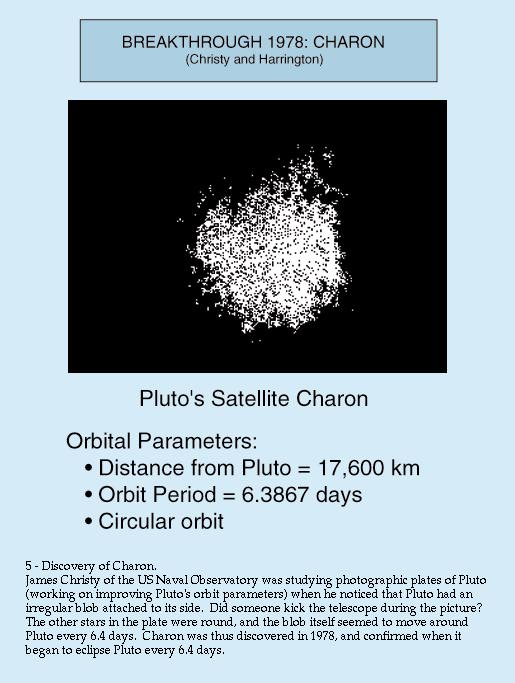
1978 image of Pluto and Charon; the discovery image of Charon

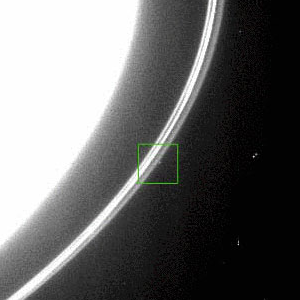
Discovery image of Saturn's still unconfirmed moon S/2004 S 3

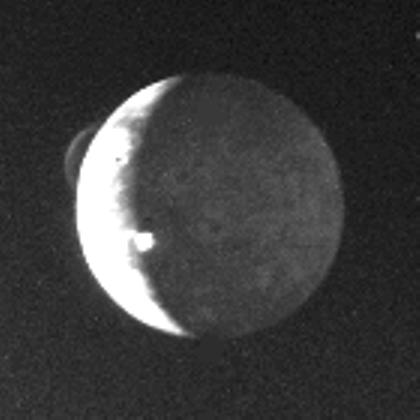
Discovery image of active volcanism on Io

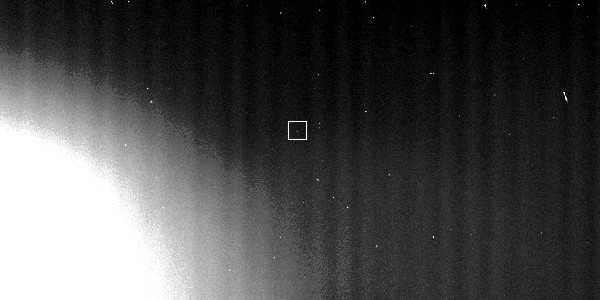
Discovery image of Pallene

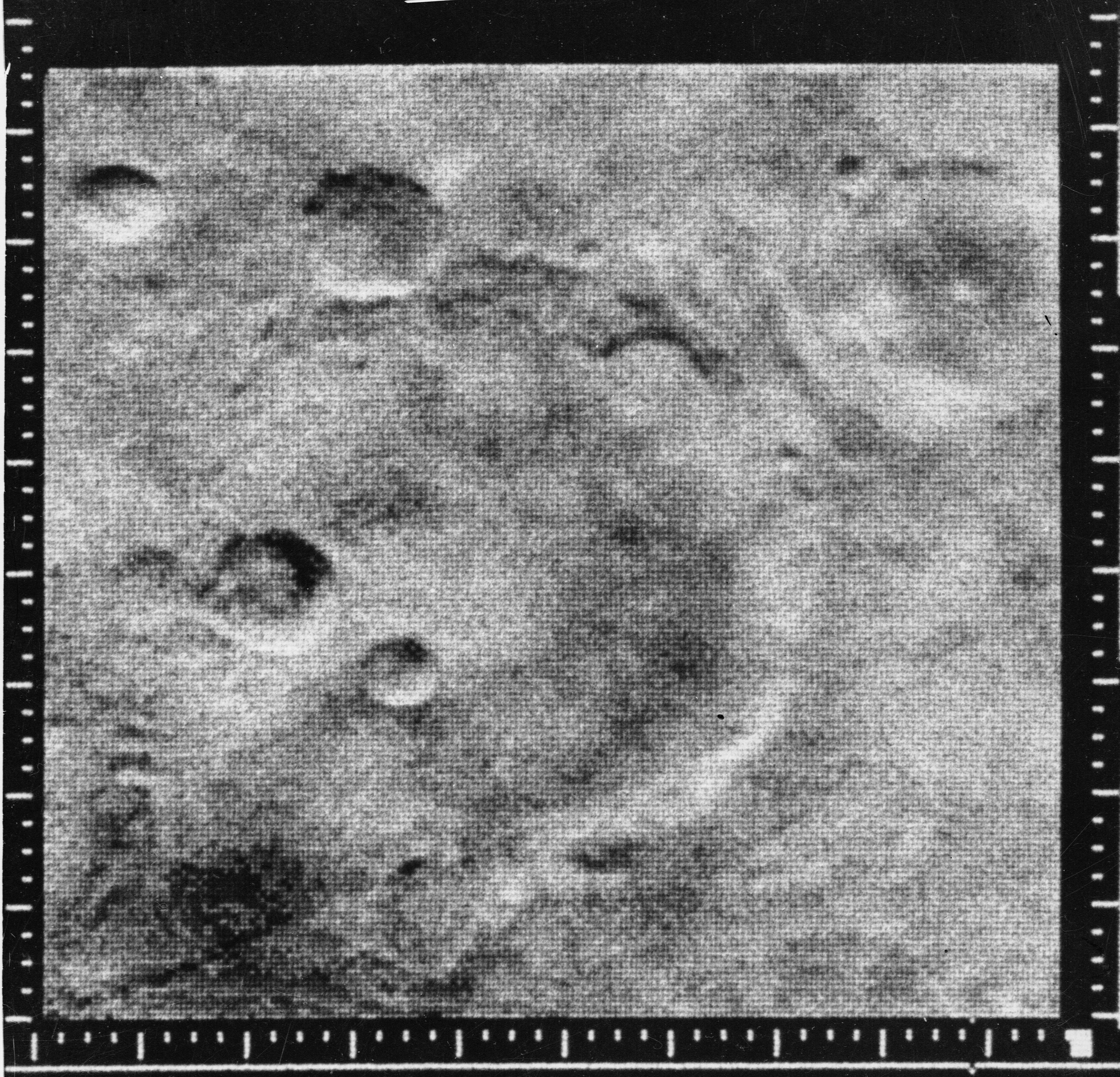
Mariner crater on Mars, as viewed by Mariner 4

== See also ==
- Precovery
