= S/2004 S 3 =

Unconfirmed object orbiting Saturn

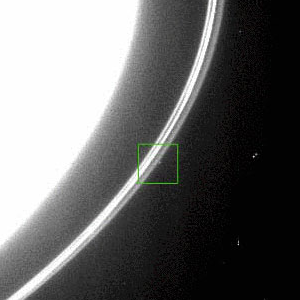
- Discovery image of S/2004 S 3

Discovery
- Discovered by: CICLOPS Team
- Discovery date: June 21, 2004

Orbital characteristics
- Semi-major axis: 140,100–140,600 km
- Eccentricity: < 0.002 (Note: Based on above semimajor axis range, and Spitale Jacobson et al. 2006)
- Orbital period (sidereal): 0.62 d
- Inclination: close to zero
- Satellite of: Saturn

Physical characteristics
- Mean radius: ~2 km
- Synodic rotation period: probably synchronous
- Axial tilt: unknown
- Albedo: unknown

S/2004 S 3 is an unconfirmed moon of Saturn, seen orbiting just beyond the outer strand of the F ring on June 21, 2004. It was discovered by the Cassini Imaging Science Team in images taken by the Cassini–Huygens probe on June 21, 2004 and announced on September 9, 2004.

Animated sequence of S/2004 S 3 discovery images by Cassini on June 21, 2004

Despite later attempts to recover it, it has not been reliably sighted since. Notably, an imaging sequence covering an entire orbital period at 4 km resolution taken on November 15, 2004 failed to recover the object. The sequence should have been easily capable of detecting a moon of similar size, suggesting it to simply be a transient clump. An approximate linkage could be made of S/2004 S 3 to S/2004 S 4, and matched to two other detected clumps on other dates, but considering its non-detection in November, their relation is probably coincidental.

Another object, S/2004 S 4, was sighted nearby 5 hours later, but this time just inside the F Ring. Because of the differing localisation the second object was given a fresh designation, although their interpretation as a single object on a F-ring crossing orbit is also possible. Such an object might also be orbiting at a slightly different inclination to the F ring, thereby not actually passing through the ring material despite being seen both radially inward and outward of it.

If a solid object after all, S/2004 S 3 would be 3–5 km in diameter based on brightness, and might be a shepherd satellite for the outer edge of Saturn's F ring.
