= S/2004 S 4 =

Hypothetical moon of Saturn

Discovery
- Discovered by: CICLOPS Team
- Discovery date: June 21, 2004

Orbital characteristics
- Semi-major axis: ~140,100 km
- Eccentricity: unknown, small
- Orbital period (sidereal): ~0.618 d
- Inclination: unknown, small
- Satellite of: Saturn

Physical characteristics
- Mean radius: ~2 km
- Synodic rotation period: probably synchronous
- Axial tilt: unknown
- Albedo: unknown

S/2004 S 4 is the provisional designation of an unconfirmed object seen orbiting Saturn within the inner strand of the F ring on June 21, 2004. It was spotted while J. N. Spitale was trying to confirm the orbit of another provisional object, S/2004 S 3, that was seen 5 hours earlier just exterior to the F ring. The announcement was made on September 9, 2004.

Despite later attempts to recover it, it has not been reliably sighted since. Notably, an imaging sequence covering an entire orbital period at 4 km resolution taken on November 15, 2004, failed to recover the object. The sequence should have been easily capable of detecting a moon of similar size, suggesting it to simply be a transient clump. An approximate linkage could be made of S/2004 S 3 to S/2004 S 4, and matched to two other detected clumps on other dates, but considering its non-detection in November, their relation is probably coincidental.

An interpretation where S/2004 S 3 and S/2004 S 4 are or were a single object on a F-ring crossing orbit is also possible. Such an object might also be orbiting at a slightly different inclination to the F ring, thereby not actually passing through the ring material despite being seen both radially inward and outward of it.

If a solid object after all, S/2004 S 4 would be 3–5 km in diameter based on brightness.
