= Uranus XXVIII =

Inner moon of Uranus

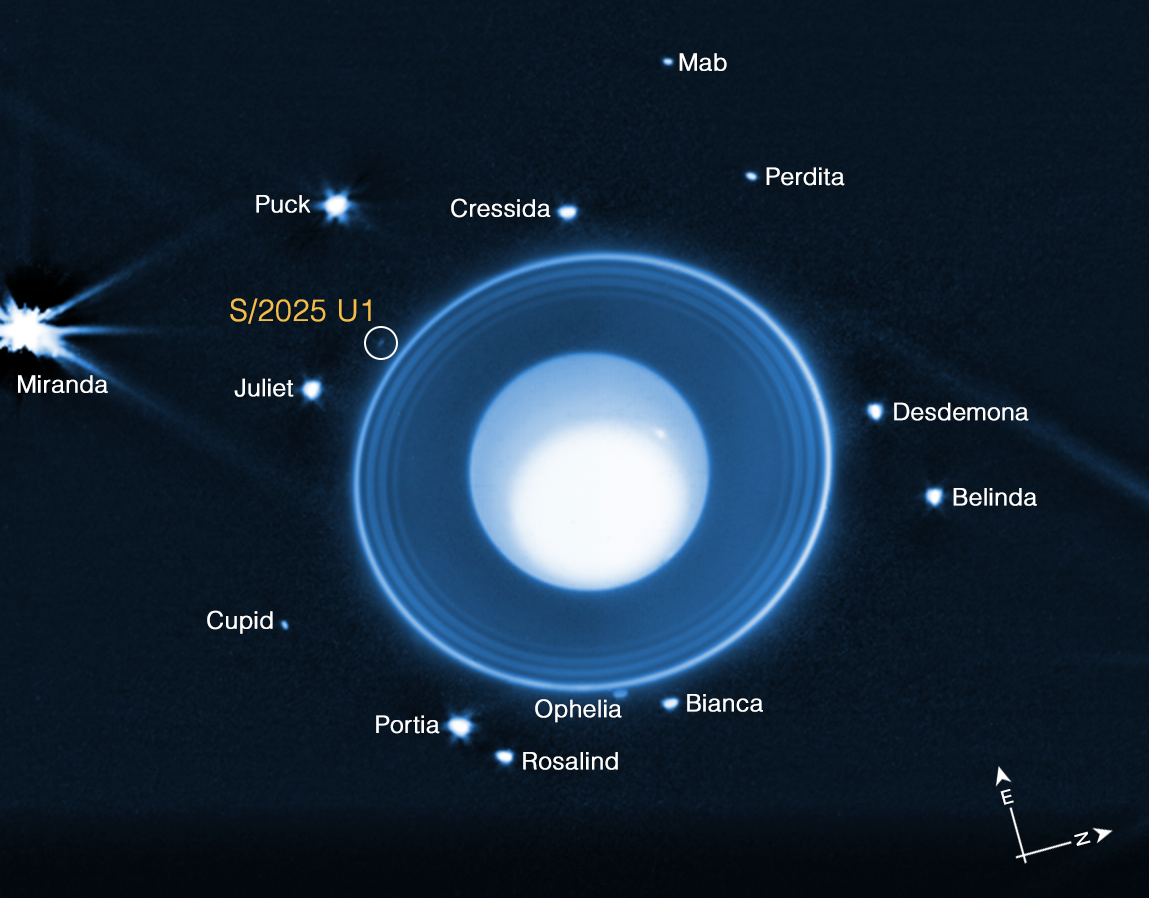
- Discovery image of Uranus XXVIII (S/2025 U 1; circled) by the James Webb Space Telescope on 2 February 2025

Discovery
- Discovered by: Maryame El Moutamid et al. (Note: The full team of researchers involved in the discovery of this moon includes: Maryame El Moutamid, Matthew M. Hedman, Mark R. Showalter, Matthew Tiscareno, Imke de Pater, Jack J. Lissauer, and Damya Souami.)
- Discovery site: James Webb Space Telescope
- Discovery date: 2 February 2025 (date of discovery images)

Designations
- Designation: Uranus XXVIII (28)
- Alternative names: S/2025 U 1

Orbital characteristics
- Epoch 1 January 2025 TDB
- Semi-major axis: 57844 km
- Eccentricity: 0.039
- Orbital period (sidereal): 0.4021 d (9.65 h)
- Mean anomaly: 275.6°
- Inclination: 4.0° (wrt local Laplace plane (Note: The local Laplace plane is the plane containing the satellite's nodal orbital precession. For regular moons of Uranus, their Laplace planes are usually closely aligned with the plane of Uranus's equator.))
- Longitude of ascending node: 70.8°
- Argument of perihelion: 313.9°
- Satellite of: Uranus

Physical characteristics
- Mean diameter: 8–10 km (5–6 mi)
- Mean density: 0.5–1.2 g/cm^{3}
- Albedo: 0.05–0.10 (assumed)
- Apparent magnitude: 25.5 (H-band)

Uranus XXVIII (previously known as S/2025 U 1) is a small moon of Uranus, with an estimated diameter between 8 and 10 kilometres (5 and 6 miles). It was the 29th moon identified in the Uranian system. The discovery was announced in August 2025 by a team of astronomers led by Maryame El Moutamid, who found the moon in James Webb Space Telescope NIRCam images taken on 2 February 2025. (Note: The NIRCam discovery observations consisted of ten consecutive near-infrared images, each with 40-minute-long exposure times.)

The moon orbits about 57,844 km (35,943 mi) from the center of Uranus (between the orbits of Ophelia and Bianca) with an orbital period of 9.6 hours (0.402 days). Like the other inner moons of Uranus, it follows a nearly circular orbit along Uranus's equatorial plane. Due to its small size, it appears extremely faint with a near-infrared (H-band) apparent magnitude of 25.5—too faint to be seen by the Hubble Space Telescope and the Voyager 2 spacecraft.

== Name ==
Uranus XXVIII (or Uranus 28 (Note: The Roman numeral designation does not reflect the chronological order of the moon's discovery or announcement. For example, S/2023 U 1 was the 28th Uranian moon discovered chronologically, but the Roman numeral designation Uranus XXVIII (28) was instead given to S/2025 U 1, which was discovered later.)) is the permanent Roman numeral designation of this unnamed moon, given by the International Astronomical Union (IAU) Minor Planet Center on 24 March 2026. Previously, it was known as S/2025 U 1, the temporary provisional designation given when it was announced. By convention, the moons of Uranus are named after characters from the plays of William Shakespeare and Alexander Pope. A proper name will be given once it is approved by the IAU. Co-discoverer Mark R. Showalter has stated in a 2025 New Scientist article that "there have been discussions [of a name for the moon] but no shortlist as yet."

== Orbit ==
JWST timelapse of Uranus XXVIII (circled) orbiting Uranus, along with Miranda (upper left) and the rest of Uranus's inner moons except Cordelia, which is hidden in the glare of Uranus's rings

Uranus XXVIII is the 14th known member of Uranus's inner moons, which are small moons that orbit interior to the planet's five largest moons (Miranda, Ariel, Umbriel, Titania, and Oberon). Uranus XXVIII follows a nearly circular orbit around Uranus's equatorial plane, at a distance of 57,844 km (35,943 mi) from the planet's center with an orbital period of 9.6 hours (0.402 days). Uranus XXVIII is located outside the edge of Uranus's inner ring system, between the orbits of Ophelia and Bianca. The nearly circular orbit of Uranus XXVIII suggests that it formed near its current location, according to El Moutamid.
