= List of Jupiter trojans (Trojan camp) (600001–700000) =

This is a partial list of Jupiter's L_{5} trojans (60° behind Jupiter) with numbers 600001–700000. If available, an object's mean diameter is taken from the NEOWISE data release, which the Small-Body Database has also adopted. Mean diameters are rounded to two significant figures if smaller than 100 kilometers. Estimates are in italics and calculated from a magnitude-to-diameter conversion, using an assumed albedo of 0.057.

== 600001–700000 ==
This list contains 423 objects sorted in numerical order.

Designation	Discovery			Orbital description					Diam.	Remarks	Refs
Designation	Date	Observer	Site	a (AU)	e	i (°)	q (AU)	Q (AU)	Diam.	Remarks	Refs
(600207) 2011 QR_{51}	31 August 2011	Pan-STARRS	Haleakala	5.311	0.086	6.5	4.855	5.766	8.0 km	–	catalog · MPC · JPL
(600888) 2012 SQ_{33}	3 December 2002	NEAT	Palomar	5.192	0.077	11.1	4.793	5.591	12 km	–	catalog · MPC · JPL
(600895) 2012 SW_{48}	3 December 2005	Mauna Kea Obs.	Mauna Kea	5.267	0.074	3.9	4.876	5.659	8.5 km	–	catalog · MPC · JPL
(600905) 2012 TR	3 December 2005	Mauna Kea Obs.	Mauna Kea	5.231	0.110	1.4	4.654	5.809	7.1 km	–	catalog · MPC · JPL
(600919) 2012 TD_{52}	3 November 2003	SDSS Collaboration	Apache Point	5.226	0.022	29.6	5.111	5.340	11 km	–	catalog · MPC · JPL
(600935) 2012 TD_{123}	2 July 2011	Spacewatch	Kitt Peak	5.182	0.164	14.6	4.331	6.032	9.7 km	–	catalog · MPC · JPL
(600997) 2012 TN_{353}	24 October 2013	Mount Lemmon Survey	Mount Lemmon	5.291	0.044	12.0	5.056	5.525	7.1 km	–	catalog · MPC · JPL
(601007) 2012 TW_{372}	11 October 2012	Mount Lemmon Survey	Mount Lemmon	5.189	0.104	19.9	4.650	5.727	5.6 km	–	catalog · MPC · JPL
(601037) 2012 UE_{69}	2 December 2005	Mauna Kea Obs.	Mauna Kea	5.227	0.074	3.4	4.839	5.615	7.3 km	–	catalog · MPC · JPL
(601825) 2013 TL_{34}	2 October 2013	PTF	Palomar	5.207	0.161	3.9	4.370	6.044	8.9 km	–	catalog · MPC · JPL
(601861) 2013 TL_{224}	2 October 2013	Pan-STARRS	Haleakala	5.259	0.086	12.7	4.805	5.712	7.7 km	–	catalog · MPC · JPL
(601862) 2013 TW_{224}	5 October 2013	Pan-STARRS	Haleakala	5.130	0.078	8.8	4.730	5.531	7.1 km	–	catalog · MPC · JPL
(602995) 2014 US_{167}	26 October 2014	Mount Lemmon Survey	Mount Lemmon	5.138	0.082	12.6	4.718	5.558	6.7 km	–	catalog · MPC · JPL
(603001) 2014 UO_{203}	25 April 2008	Spacewatch	Kitt Peak	5.167	0.014	10.4	5.095	5.239	8.5 km	–	catalog · MPC · JPL
(603025) 2014 WO_{44}	25 October 2014	Pan-STARRS	Haleakala	5.283	0.086	14.0	4.828	5.739	8.4 km	–	catalog · MPC · JPL
(603128) 2014 XP_{20}	2 October 2013	Pan-STARRS	Haleakala	5.144	0.111	14.5	4.573	5.716	7.3 km	–	catalog · MPC · JPL
(605056) 2016 AY_{299}	4 January 2016	Pan-STARRS	Haleakala	5.202	0.092	30.4	4.724	5.680	7.7 km	–	catalog · MPC · JPL
(605058) 2016 AD_{303}	13 January 2016	Mount Lemmon Survey	Mount Lemmon	5.175	0.055	27.6	4.889	5.460	7.0 km	–	catalog · MPC · JPL
(605063) 2016 BJ	2 January 2016	Mount Lemmon Survey	Mount Lemmon	5.163	0.016	20.2	5.082	5.244	7.1 km	–	catalog · MPC · JPL
(605947) 2017 AH_{35}	4 January 2017	Pan-STARRS	Haleakala	5.185	0.029	9.1	5.037	5.333	5.7 km	–	catalog · MPC · JPL
(605994) 2017 BC_{171}	28 January 2017	Pan-STARRS	Haleakala	5.209	0.091	11.6	4.734	5.684	7.7 km	–	catalog · MPC · JPL
(606014) 2017 DD_{21}	20 December 2004	Mount Lemmon Survey	Mount Lemmon	5.214	0.092	8.2	4.734	5.694	7.7 km	–	catalog · MPC · JPL
(606825) 2019 GD_{14}	29 March 2008	Spacewatch	Kitt Peak	5.174	0.026	15.0	5.042	5.306	7.0 km	–	catalog · MPC · JPL
(606827) 2019 GE_{17}	28 July 2011	Pan-STARRS	Haleakala	5.249	0.031	21.3	5.089	5.410	8.4 km	–	catalog · MPC · JPL
(606830) 2019 GW_{18}	8 November 2016	Pan-STARRS	Haleakala	5.162	0.046	28.1	4.927	5.397	7.4 km	–	catalog · MPC · JPL
(606831) 2019 GZ_{20}	27 October 2014	Pan-STARRS	Haleakala	5.210	0.029	28.7	5.058	5.361	8.7 km	–	catalog · MPC · JPL
(606906) 2019 KK_{1}	9 March 2018	Mount Lemmon Survey	Mount Lemmon	5.173	0.043	32.2	4.949	5.396	8.4 km	–	catalog · MPC · JPL
(609345) 2005 AW_{72}	15 January 2005	Spacewatch	Kitt Peak	5.188	0.081	17.4	4.768	5.608	8.5 km	–	catalog · MPC · JPL
(614872) 2000 SV_{384}	12 October 2013	Mount Lemmon Survey	Mount Lemmon	5.217	0.083	14.9	4.784	5.650	7.5 km	–	catalog · MPC · JPL
(615052) 2001 WG_{107}	3 September 2013	Spacewatch	Kitt Peak	5.165	0.024	25.3	5.040	5.290	9.6 km	–	catalog · MPC · JPL
(616005) 2005 BU_{56}	18 January 2005	Spacewatch	Kitt Peak	5.138	0.026	11.2	5.004	5.273	7.8 km	–	catalog · MPC · JPL
(616568) 2005 XX_{132}	2 December 2005	L. H. Wasserman; R. Millis	Kitt Peak	5.245	0.050	7.1	4.983	5.507	7.8 km	–	catalog · MPC · JPL
(616782) 2000 QK_{234}	27 September 2000	Spacewatch	Kitt Peak	5.145	0.076	9.3	4.752	5.538	7.5 km	–	catalog · MPC · JPL
(616788) 2000 RB_{108}	18 December 2015	Mount Lemmon Survey	Mount Lemmon	5.195	0.083	6.3	4.762	5.628	6.8 km	–	catalog · MPC · JPL
(616802) 2000 SJ_{384}	6 April 2008	Spacewatch	Kitt Peak	5.190	0.090	14.8	4.724	5.656	7.9 km	–	catalog · MPC · JPL
(616803) 2000 SS_{384}	26 November 2014	Pan-STARRS	Haleakala	5.250	0.047	13.9	5.001	5.499	7.4 km	–	catalog · MPC · JPL
(616807) 2000 TV_{80}	8 October 2012	Mount Lemmon Survey	Mount Lemmon	5.139	0.078	9.7	4.737	5.541	6.7 km	–	catalog · MPC · JPL
(616881) 2001 TA_{266}	4 October 2013	Mount Lemmon Survey	Mount Lemmon	5.139	0.056	11.1	4.850	5.428	11 km	–	catalog · MPC · JPL
(616882) 2001 TA_{268}	18 September 2012	Mount Lemmon Survey	Mount Lemmon	5.084	0.074	13.8	4.707	5.460	6.3 km	–	catalog · MPC · JPL
(616890) 2001 UZ_{232}	23 October 2013	Mount Lemmon Survey	Mount Lemmon	5.188	0.036	9.7	5.002	5.373	7.9 km	–	catalog · MPC · JPL
(616896) 2001 UD_{236}	21 November 2014	Pan-STARRS	Haleakala	5.203	0.017	9.5	5.112	5.293	6.0 km	–	catalog · MPC · JPL
(616898) 2001 UT_{236}	15 October 2012	Mount Lemmon Survey	Mount Lemmon	5.245	0.096	9.2	4.739	5.751	8.4 km	–	catalog · MPC · JPL
(616926) 2001 YS_{165}	30 March 2008	Spacewatch	Kitt Peak	5.225	0.126	17.9	4.568	5.883	8.5 km	–	catalog · MPC · JPL
(617066) 2002 VY_{153}	6 April 2008	Spacewatch	Kitt Peak	5.147	0.055	12.4	4.862	5.432	7.8 km	–	catalog · MPC · JPL
(617201) 2003 WN_{196}	24 April 2009	Mount Lemmon Survey	Mount Lemmon	5.185	0.123	35.1	4.549	5.820	12 km	–	catalog · MPC · JPL
(617393) 2004 YE_{13}	19 December 2004	Mount Lemmon Survey	Mount Lemmon	5.114	0.024	29.2	4.990	5.237	9.3 km	–	catalog · MPC · JPL
(617397) 2005 AW_{27}	13 December 2004	Spacewatch	Kitt Peak	5.200	0.137	9.1	4.487	5.912	10 km	–	catalog · MPC · JPL
(617402) 2005 BC_{34}	16 January 2005	Mauna Kea Obs.	Mauna Kea	5.193	0.114	9.8	4.601	5.784	7.0 km	–	catalog · MPC · JPL
(617404) 2005 BV_{54}	22 June 2010	Mount Lemmon Survey	Mount Lemmon	5.198	0.094	18.6	4.708	5.687	12 km	–	catalog · MPC · JPL
(617693) 2005 UN_{534}	31 October 2005	Mauna Kea Obs.	Mauna Kea	5.187	0.042	8.4	4.967	5.408	7.3 km	–	catalog · MPC · JPL
(617707) 2005 UR_{547}	24 October 2005	Mauna Kea Obs.	Mauna Kea	5.233	0.110	10.3	4.656	5.811	8.0 km	–	catalog · MPC · JPL
(617777) 2005 XR_{106}	1 December 2005	L. H. Wasserman; R. Millis	Kitt Peak	5.261	0.129	8.6	4.581	5.942	6.2 km	–	catalog · MPC · JPL
(617778) 2005 XW_{106}	24 October 2005	Mauna Kea Obs.	Mauna Kea	5.236	0.069	14.2	4.875	5.597	9.1 km	–	catalog · MPC · JPL
(617826) 2006 AM_{113}	12 January 2018	Pan-STARRS	Haleakala	5.155	0.139	7.0	4.438	5.872	6.6 km	–	catalog · MPC · JPL
(617839) 2006 BD_{159}	26 January 2006	Spacewatch	Kitt Peak	5.190	0.058	9.2	4.887	5.493	8.2 km	–	catalog · MPC · JPL
(617843) 2006 BF_{197}	30 January 2006	Spacewatch	Kitt Peak	5.227	0.082	9.9	4.798	5.656	7.8 km	–	catalog · MPC · JPL
(617847) 2006 BV_{242}	31 January 2006	Spacewatch	Kitt Peak	5.209	0.040	4.1	4.999	5.420	6.8 km	–	catalog · MPC · JPL
(617851) 2006 BA_{275}	26 January 2006	Spacewatch	Kitt Peak	5.165	0.090	14.7	4.700	5.631	10 km	–	catalog · MPC · JPL
(617853) 2006 BG_{287}	23 January 2006	Spacewatch	Kitt Peak	5.178	0.044	17.3	4.949	5.407	7.1 km	–	catalog · MPC · JPL
(617854) 2006 BJ_{289}	23 January 2006	Spacewatch	Kitt Peak	5.214	0.073	29.1	4.834	5.593	8.2 km	–	catalog · MPC · JPL
(617855) 2006 BD_{291}	30 January 2006	Spacewatch	Kitt Peak	5.238	0.038	10.8	5.040	5.437	7.5 km	–	catalog · MPC · JPL
(617857) 2006 BK_{293}	26 January 2006	Mount Lemmon Survey	Mount Lemmon	5.165	0.102	5.7	4.639	5.691	7.7 km	–	catalog · MPC · JPL
(617860) 2006 CZ_{15}	13 December 2004	Spacewatch	Kitt Peak	5.148	0.020	11.0	5.044	5.252	11 km	–	catalog · MPC · JPL
(617861) 2006 CX_{31}	2 February 2006	Spacewatch	Kitt Peak	5.178	0.101	10.6	4.653	5.704	9.2 km	–	catalog · MPC · JPL
(617866) 2006 CY_{84}	4 February 2006	Spacewatch	Kitt Peak	5.240	0.026	14.3	5.102	5.379	7.2 km	–	catalog · MPC · JPL
(617873) 2006 DJ_{48}	30 January 2006	Spacewatch	Kitt Peak	5.220	0.075	21.8	4.829	5.611	6.8 km	–	catalog · MPC · JPL
(617874) 2006 DR_{72}	4 February 2006	Spacewatch	Kitt Peak	5.169	0.059	17.2	4.866	5.473	6.3 km	–	catalog · MPC · JPL
(617877) 2006 DU_{125}	26 January 2006	Spacewatch	Kitt Peak	5.166	0.069	29.4	4.808	5.524	8.6 km	–	catalog · MPC · JPL
(617878) 2006 DY_{140}	25 February 2006	Spacewatch	Kitt Peak	5.268	0.060	8.8	4.953	5.584	8.7 km	–	catalog · MPC · JPL
(617880) 2006 DW_{162}	27 February 2006	Mount Lemmon Survey	Mount Lemmon	5.152	0.066	12.6	4.813	5.491	6.8 km	–	catalog · MPC · JPL
(617882) 2006 DP_{174}	27 February 2006	Spacewatch	Kitt Peak	5.252	0.055	13.4	4.965	5.538	11 km	–	catalog · MPC · JPL
(617885) 2006 DB_{220}	15 April 2007	Mount Lemmon Survey	Mount Lemmon	5.218	0.056	9.6	4.927	5.510	8.2 km	–	catalog · MPC · JPL
(617887) 2006 DB_{223}	27 February 2006	Mount Lemmon Survey	Mount Lemmon	5.273	0.027	2.1	5.131	5.415	7.0 km	–	catalog · MPC · JPL
(617891) 2006 ER_{32}	3 March 2006	Spacewatch	Kitt Peak	5.244	0.098	8.2	4.728	5.759	8.7 km	–	catalog · MPC · JPL
(617893) 2006 ET_{49}	10 February 2005	A. Boattini	La Silla	5.266	0.044	5.8	5.035	5.498	7.8 km	–	catalog · MPC · JPL
(617894) 2006 EF_{80}	15 October 2012	Pan-STARRS	Haleakala	5.248	0.024	9.7	5.122	5.374	7.6 km	–	catalog · MPC · JPL
(618224) 2007 DT_{128}	21 February 2007	Spacewatch	Kitt Peak	5.068	0.021	4.6	4.961	5.175	6.0 km	–	catalog · MPC · JPL
(618250) 2007 EQ_{234}	10 March 2007	Mount Lemmon Survey	Mount Lemmon	5.240	0.135	5.1	4.531	5.950	6.6 km	–	catalog · MPC · JPL
(618254) 2007 ER_{238}	9 March 2007	Spacewatch	Kitt Peak	5.176	0.114	4.1	4.587	5.764	6.5 km	–	catalog · MPC · JPL
(618258) 2007 FT_{61}	26 March 2007	Mount Lemmon Survey	Mount Lemmon	5.169	0.113	0.8	4.586	5.752	6.8 km	–	catalog · MPC · JPL
(618261) 2007 GG_{26}	14 April 2007	Mount Lemmon Survey	Mount Lemmon	5.224	0.116	7.2	4.619	5.829	6.0 km	–	catalog · MPC · JPL
(618270) 2007 GA_{69}	15 April 2007	Mount Lemmon Survey	Mount Lemmon	5.169	0.014	5.7	5.096	5.242	6.7 km	–	catalog · MPC · JPL
(618283) 2007 HO_{69}	25 March 2007	Mount Lemmon Survey	Mount Lemmon	5.287	0.011	20.1	5.231	5.343	11 km	–	catalog · MPC · JPL
(618288) 2007 HS_{100}	26 April 2007	Mount Lemmon Survey	Mount Lemmon	5.279	0.024	11.2	5.154	5.404	8.5 km	–	catalog · MPC · JPL
(618289) 2007 HJ_{101}	17 September 2012	Mount Lemmon Survey	Mount Lemmon	5.240	0.093	7.5	4.753	5.727	7.3 km	–	catalog · MPC · JPL
(618295) 2007 HQ_{107}	15 September 2012	Mount Lemmon Survey	Mount Lemmon	5.237	0.071	16.8	4.863	5.611	7.4 km	–	catalog · MPC · JPL
(618432) 2000 QF_{258}	26 August 2012	Pan-STARRS	Haleakala	5.138	0.020	2.7	5.035	5.241	6.5 km	–	catalog · MPC · JPL
(618433) 2000 QT_{258}	4 October 2013	Mount Lemmon Survey	Mount Lemmon	5.223	0.017	15.0	5.136	5.310	7.3 km	–	catalog · MPC · JPL
(618444) 2000 SK_{382}	1 April 2008	Spacewatch	Kitt Peak	5.201	0.052	14.8	4.933	5.469	7.7 km	–	catalog · MPC · JPL
(618449) 2000 TC_{79}	12 March 2007	Spacewatch	Kitt Peak	5.202	0.008	23.7	5.160	5.243	9.2 km	–	catalog · MPC · JPL
(618530) 2001 TM_{268}	12 January 2015	Pan-STARRS	Haleakala	5.174	0.021	26.8	5.063	5.285	6.8 km	–	catalog · MPC · JPL
(618538) 2001 UL_{138}	23 October 2001	LINEAR	Socorro	5.162	0.134	22.3	4.472	5.851	8.9 km	–	catalog · MPC · JPL
(618548) 2001 UJ_{239}	3 October 2013	Pan-STARRS	Haleakala	5.217	0.076	15.3	4.822	5.613	7.7 km	–	catalog · MPC · JPL
(618786) 2003 WS_{197}	26 August 2012	Pan-STARRS	Haleakala	5.167	0.081	5.7	4.751	5.583	6.5 km	–	catalog · MPC · JPL
(618986) 2005 AA_{83}	15 January 2005	Spacewatch	Kitt Peak	5.233	0.033	13.0	5.062	5.404	7.9 km	–	catalog · MPC · JPL
(618988) 2005 BC_{35}	16 January 2005	Mauna Kea Obs.	Mauna Kea	5.171	0.013	2.0	5.104	5.238	5.6 km	–	catalog · MPC · JPL
(620156) 2000 TU_{80}	17 March 2005	Mount Lemmon Survey	Mount Lemmon	5.202	0.116	13.3	4.598	5.805	7.9 km	–	catalog · MPC · JPL
(620226) 2001 UR_{232}	18 October 2001	NEAT	Palomar	5.233	0.082	11.5	4.803	5.663	9.1 km	–	catalog · MPC · JPL
(620385) 2002 WP_{31}	23 June 2008	Spacewatch	Kitt Peak	5.210	0.051	31.4	4.943	5.477	11 km	–	catalog · MPC · JPL
(620658) 2005 TB_{200}	7 October 2005	Mauna Kea Obs.	Mauna Kea	5.204	0.073	1.8	4.826	5.582	7.7 km	–	catalog · MPC · JPL
(620714) 2006 AZ_{110}	1 June 2012	Mount Lemmon Survey	Mount Lemmon	5.133	0.044	26.1	4.908	5.358	9.6 km	–	catalog · MPC · JPL
(620715) 2006 BK_{86}	25 January 2006	Spacewatch	Kitt Peak	5.145	0.026	12.2	5.013	5.277	7.9 km	–	catalog · MPC · JPL
(620717) 2006 BL_{169}	26 January 2006	Mount Lemmon Survey	Mount Lemmon	5.272	0.077	21.7	4.867	5.677	7.8 km	–	catalog · MPC · JPL
(620720) 2006 BC_{253}	1 December 2005	L. H. Wasserman; R. Millis	Kitt Peak	5.220	0.036	7.1	5.034	5.406	8.1 km	–	catalog · MPC · JPL
(620991) 2007 DL_{126}	21 February 2007	Mount Lemmon Survey	Mount Lemmon	5.108	0.089	27.0	4.652	5.563	8.8 km	–	catalog · MPC · JPL
(620994) 2007 FH_{61}	19 March 2007	Mount Lemmon Survey	Mount Lemmon	5.289	0.146	12.3	4.515	6.063	8.3 km	–	catalog · MPC · JPL
(621277) 2008 GU_{167}	3 April 2008	Mount Lemmon Survey	Mount Lemmon	5.197	0.089	17.9	4.734	5.661	7.8 km	–	catalog · MPC · JPL
(621299) 2008 LF_{19}	12 September 2013	Mount Lemmon Survey	Mount Lemmon	5.179	0.088	25.8	4.721	5.637	8.0 km	–	catalog · MPC · JPL
(621523) 2009 FD_{32}	26 March 2009	Alianza S4 Obs.	Cerro Burek	5.248	0.040	15.2	5.040	5.457	13 km	–	catalog · MPC · JPL
(621534) 2009 HP_{64}	1 January 2009	Mount Lemmon Survey	Mount Lemmon	5.171	0.039	14.8	4.970	5.372	11 km	–	catalog · MPC · JPL
(621714) 2010 FB_{131}	24 August 2012	Spacewatch	Kitt Peak	5.198	0.107	22.5	4.641	5.754	8.1 km	–	catalog · MPC · JPL
(621894) 2011 PG_{21}	2 August 2011	Pan-STARRS	Haleakala	5.230	0.072	9.1	4.854	5.606	7.7 km	–	catalog · MPC · JPL
(621895) 2011 PJ_{22}	2 August 2011	Pan-STARRS	Haleakala	5.249	0.092	31.0	4.765	5.733	6.8 km	–	catalog · MPC · JPL
(621905) 2011 QB_{108}	11 December 2014	Mount Lemmon Survey	Mount Lemmon	5.211	0.117	13.9	4.602	5.820	8.3 km	–	catalog · MPC · JPL
(622131) 2012 PR_{10}	1 February 2006	Spacewatch	Kitt Peak	5.258	0.034	21.7	5.081	5.434	8.1 km	–	catalog · MPC · JPL
(622132) 2012 PA_{12}	10 August 2012	Spacewatch	Kitt Peak	5.248	0.086	5.7	4.795	5.700	7.1 km	–	catalog · MPC · JPL
(622139) 2012 QH_{10}	29 December 2003	Spacewatch	Kitt Peak	5.175	0.086	11.5	4.729	5.622	10 km	–	catalog · MPC · JPL
(622143) 2012 QA_{64}	26 August 2012	Pan-STARRS	Haleakala	5.146	0.135	18.1	4.450	5.842	8.9 km	–	catalog · MPC · JPL
(622144) 2012 QC_{64}	25 August 2012	Spacewatch	Kitt Peak	5.251	0.089	9.9	4.782	5.720	8.6 km	–	catalog · MPC · JPL
(622150) 2012 RP_{25}	28 August 2012	Mount Lemmon Survey	Mount Lemmon	5.162	0.061	17.0	4.847	5.477	8.5 km	–	catalog · MPC · JPL
(622163) 2012 TQ_{51}	7 January 2005	Spacewatch	Kitt Peak	5.268	0.080	17.4	4.849	5.687	10 km	–	catalog · MPC · JPL
(622164) 2012 TU_{60}	8 October 2012	Pan-STARRS	Haleakala	5.284	0.076	14.1	4.881	5.687	9.5 km	–	catalog · MPC · JPL
(622174) 2012 TS_{256}	2 August 2011	Pan-STARRS	Haleakala	5.204	0.164	11.6	4.350	6.058	8.3 km	–	catalog · MPC · JPL
(622401) 2013 TD_{24}	8 April 2008	Spacewatch	Kitt Peak	5.134	0.018	22.8	5.040	5.227	9.4 km	–	catalog · MPC · JPL
(622402) 2013 TJ_{25}	21 February 2007	Spacewatch	Kitt Peak	5.101	0.056	0.4	4.813	5.389	7.2 km	–	catalog · MPC · JPL
(622421) 2013 TH_{137}	14 August 2012	Pan-STARRS	Haleakala	5.228	0.166	4.2	4.359	6.096	7.1 km	–	catalog · MPC · JPL
(622424) 2013 TD_{150}	4 September 2013	F. Hormuth	Calar Alto	5.208	0.081	3.3	4.787	5.630	6.8 km	–	catalog · MPC · JPL
(622829) 2014 WJ_{15}	16 November 2014	Mount Lemmon Survey	Mount Lemmon	5.182	0.080	15.5	4.770	5.595	6.8 km	–	catalog · MPC · JPL
(622880) 2014 WO_{358}	24 October 2005	Mauna Kea Obs.	Mauna Kea	5.178	0.034	8.4	5.002	5.353	8.3 km	–	catalog · MPC · JPL
(622903) 2014 WT_{575}	27 November 2014	Pan-STARRS	Haleakala	5.234	0.028	19.7	5.086	5.383	9.8 km	–	catalog · MPC · JPL
(622908) 2014 YM_{42}	16 January 2005	Mauna Kea Obs.	Mauna Kea	5.198	0.085	16.1	4.758	5.638	7.5 km	–	catalog · MPC · JPL
(623383) 2015 XT_{195}	28 October 2014	Pan-STARRS	Haleakala	5.180	0.016	19.9	5.095	5.264	8.9 km	–	catalog · MPC · JPL
(623399) 2015 XX_{368}	26 October 2014	Mount Lemmon Survey	Mount Lemmon	5.123	0.003	11.3	5.106	5.141	7.2 km	–	catalog · MPC · JPL
(623405) 2015 XC_{386}	4 December 2015	Pan-STARRS	Haleakala	5.157	0.038	13.2	4.963	5.351	6.8 km	–	catalog · MPC · JPL
(623639) 2016 YY_{17}	27 December 2016	Mount Lemmon Survey	Mount Lemmon	5.212	0.042	12.4	4.991	5.433	8.3 km	–	catalog · MPC · JPL
(623673) 2017 DK_{52}	22 November 2014	Pan-STARRS	Haleakala	5.252	0.071	10.0	4.881	5.622	9.2 km	–	catalog · MPC · JPL
(623817) 2020 FF_{9}	22 March 2020	Pan-STARRS	Haleakala	5.219	0.066	25.1	4.872	5.566	7.8 km	–	catalog · MPC · JPL
(623969) 2000 QY_{259}	10 November 2016	Pan-STARRS	Haleakala	5.222	0.084	6.9	4.783	5.662	5.7 km	–	catalog · MPC · JPL
(623981) 2000 TB_{81}	14 September 2013	Mount Lemmon Survey	Mount Lemmon	5.169	0.056	6.4	4.880	5.458	6.8 km	–	catalog · MPC · JPL
(624070) 2001 SG_{355}	18 September 2001	SDSS Collaboration	Apache Point	5.142	0.054	27.4	4.863	5.420	8.1 km	–	catalog · MPC · JPL
(624125) 2001 UQ_{239}	20 November 2014	Pan-STARRS	Haleakala	5.215	0.051	15.8	4.949	5.480	6.6 km	–	catalog · MPC · JPL
(624406) 2002 UB_{82}	3 October 2014	Mount Lemmon Survey	Mount Lemmon	5.234	0.041	31.4	5.021	5.447	7.8 km	–	catalog · MPC · JPL
(624420) 2002 VV_{144}	28 February 2008	Spacewatch	Kitt Peak	5.212	0.078	7.2	4.806	5.618	9.3 km	–	catalog · MPC · JPL
(625021) 2005 BQ_{36}	16 January 2005	Mauna Kea Obs.	Mauna Kea	5.188	0.047	5.5	4.944	5.432	7.1 km	–	catalog · MPC · JPL
(625032) 2005 CM_{83}	20 November 2014	Pan-STARRS	Haleakala	5.227	0.086	24.5	4.776	5.679	7.1 km	–	catalog · MPC · JPL
(625588) 2006 BX_{115}	26 January 2006	Spacewatch	Kitt Peak	5.219	0.039	13.0	5.018	5.421	7.8 km	–	catalog · MPC · JPL
(625660) 2006 HS_{133}	6 March 2006	Spacewatch	Kitt Peak	5.243	0.101	2.1	4.714	5.771	6.7 km	–	catalog · MPC · JPL
(626360) 2007 GN_{80}	1 April 2008	Spacewatch	Kitt Peak	5.215	0.035	25.5	5.033	5.397	7.9 km	–	catalog · MPC · JPL
(626381) 2007 JP_{47}	12 September 2013	Mount Lemmon Survey	Mount Lemmon	5.296	0.069	22.3	4.930	5.662	9.5 km	–	catalog · MPC · JPL
(627014) 2008 EC_{54}	6 March 2008	Mount Lemmon Survey	Mount Lemmon	5.166	0.068	13.2	4.813	5.519	9.7 km	–	catalog · MPC · JPL
(627038) 2008 EO_{177}	10 March 2008	Spacewatch	Kitt Peak	5.166	0.011	29.0	5.112	5.221	8.0 km	–	catalog · MPC · JPL
(627057) 2008 FU_{81}	1 March 2008	Spacewatch	Kitt Peak	5.191	0.035	11.9	5.008	5.374	8.0 km	–	catalog · MPC · JPL
(627058) 2008 FM_{87}	28 March 2008	Spacewatch	Kitt Peak	5.192	0.024	20.9	5.066	5.319	9.8 km	–	catalog · MPC · JPL
(627105) 2008 GY_{169}	6 April 2008	Spacewatch	Kitt Peak	5.210	0.040	15.8	4.999	5.421	6.9 km	–	catalog · MPC · JPL
(627112) 2008 HX_{31}	26 March 2007	Mount Lemmon Survey	Mount Lemmon	5.158	0.066	9.9	4.819	5.498	6.7 km	–	catalog · MPC · JPL
(627135) 2008 JB_{50}	2 May 2008	Mount Lemmon Survey	Mount Lemmon	5.196	0.059	18.6	4.889	5.502	6.9 km	–	catalog · MPC · JPL
(627143) 2008 KC_{21}	6 April 2008	Mount Lemmon Survey	Mount Lemmon	5.252	0.051	30.1	4.984	5.519	7.5 km	–	catalog · MPC · JPL
(627154) 2008 LG_{19}	21 November 2014	Pan-STARRS	Haleakala	5.235	0.004	31.9	5.212	5.259	8.3 km	–	catalog · MPC · JPL
(627835) 2011 QP_{99}	30 September 2013	Mount Lemmon Survey	Mount Lemmon	5.105	0.115	18.3	4.517	5.692	9.3 km	–	catalog · MPC · JPL
(627935) 2012 TF_{14}	13 March 2007	Spacewatch	Kitt Peak	5.251	0.019	28.0	5.152	5.350	9.0 km	–	catalog · MPC · JPL
(627945) 2012 TE_{144}	9 October 2012	Mount Lemmon Survey	Mount Lemmon	5.237	0.017	33.8	5.149	5.325	8.6 km	–	catalog · MPC · JPL
(627947) 2012 TQ_{203}	20 March 2007	Mount Lemmon Survey	Mount Lemmon	5.307	0.055	19.4	5.015	5.600	8.4 km	–	catalog · MPC · JPL
(628043) 2013 RB_{129}	2 September 2013	Mount Lemmon Survey	Mount Lemmon	5.207	0.055	14.5	4.921	5.493	7.6 km	–	catalog · MPC · JPL
(628050) 2013 SC_{104}	26 September 2013	Mount Lemmon Survey	Mount Lemmon	5.315	0.103	27.8	4.765	5.864	9.3 km	–	catalog · MPC · JPL
(628056) 2013 TE_{59}	4 October 2013	Mount Lemmon Survey	Mount Lemmon	5.096	0.062	27.1	4.778	5.414	8.8 km	–	catalog · MPC · JPL
(628065) 2013 TT_{159}	3 October 2013	Pan-STARRS	Haleakala	5.118	0.100	24.6	4.607	5.629	8.1 km	–	catalog · MPC · JPL
(628066) 2013 TB_{197}	1 October 2013	Spacewatch	Kitt Peak	5.154	0.096	23.1	4.662	5.646	7.9 km	–	catalog · MPC · JPL
(628067) 2013 TY_{223}	12 October 2013	Mount Lemmon Survey	Mount Lemmon	5.145	0.062	5.3	4.825	5.464	6.5 km	–	catalog · MPC · JPL
(628075) 2013 VS_{32}	24 October 2014	Mount Lemmon Survey	Mount Lemmon	5.257	0.111	18.4	4.673	5.840	8.5 km	–	catalog · MPC · JPL
(628313) 2014 SX_{395}	20 September 2014	Pan-STARRS	Haleakala	5.113	0.063	33.8	4.790	5.435	7.1 km	–	catalog · MPC · JPL
(628335) 2014 UU_{209}	29 October 2014	Calar Alto Obs.	Calar Alto	5.240	0.030	4.7	5.083	5.396	6.0 km	–	catalog · MPC · JPL
(628364) 2014 WM_{386}	21 November 2014	Pan-STARRS	Haleakala	5.272	0.049	15.2	5.012	5.533	6.8 km	–	catalog · MPC · JPL
(628380) 2015 AG_{46}	21 September 2012	Mount Lemmon Survey	Mount Lemmon	5.223	0.070	16.1	4.859	5.586	7.6 km	–	catalog · MPC · JPL
(628891) 2017 BC_{91}	26 August 2012	Pan-STARRS	Haleakala	5.160	0.050	31.4	4.901	5.419	8.8 km	–	catalog · MPC · JPL
(629015) 1993 BC_{16}	20 November 2014	Pan-STARRS	Haleakala	5.211	0.136	17.3	4.503	5.919	13 km	–	catalog · MPC · JPL
(629016) 1993 BD_{16}	23 January 2006	Spacewatch	Kitt Peak	5.233	0.022	4.3	5.117	5.349	7.8 km	–	catalog · MPC · JPL
(629222) 2000 SC_{387}	19 September 2000	R. Millis; R. M. Wagner	Kitt Peak	5.139	0.021	10.5	5.033	5.245	6.3 km	–	catalog · MPC · JPL
(629236) 2000 TH_{80}	18 October 2001	Spacewatch	Kitt Peak	5.201	0.030	14.7	5.047	5.356	6.8 km	–	catalog · MPC · JPL
(629237) 2000 TX_{80}	20 September 2001	Spacewatch	Kitt Peak	5.177	0.021	13.0	5.067	5.287	7.9 km	–	catalog · MPC · JPL
(629238) 2000 TX_{81}	15 April 2007	Mount Lemmon Survey	Mount Lemmon	5.244	0.035	13.8	5.061	5.427	7.9 km	–	catalog · MPC · JPL
(629345) 2001 TU_{126}	13 October 2001	Spacewatch	Kitt Peak	5.206	0.167	15.8	4.336	6.077	8.0 km	–	catalog · MPC · JPL
(629382) 2001 UC_{229}	7 April 2008	Spacewatch	Kitt Peak	5.175	0.070	14.1	4.814	5.536	8.7 km	–	catalog · MPC · JPL
(629644) 2002 VE_{153}	6 December 2015	Mount Lemmon Survey	Mount Lemmon	5.181	0.069	18.4	4.821	5.541	11 km	–	catalog · MPC · JPL
(629664) 2003 AR_{95}	10 February 2005	A. Boattini	La Silla	5.217	0.099	7.0	4.702	5.732	8.3 km	–	catalog · MPC · JPL
(629803) 2003 WE_{181}	20 November 2003	Kitt Peak Obs.	Kitt Peak	5.157	0.026	10.3	5.021	5.293	8.6 km	–	catalog · MPC · JPL
(630092) 2004 XS_{158}	14 December 2004	Spacewatch	Kitt Peak	5.171	0.073	12.3	4.795	5.548	10 km	–	catalog · MPC · JPL
(630102) 2004 YW_{40}	19 December 2004	Mount Lemmon Survey	Mount Lemmon	5.174	0.035	15.5	4.995	5.353	9.4 km	–	catalog · MPC · JPL
(630103) 2004 YF_{42}	20 December 2004	Mount Lemmon Survey	Mount Lemmon	5.220	0.046	18.0	4.981	5.459	8.7 km	–	catalog · MPC · JPL
(630116) 2005 BJ_{50}	16 January 2005	Spacewatch	Kitt Peak	5.316	0.047	10.3	5.065	5.566	10 km	–	catalog · MPC · JPL
(630117) 2005 BQ_{50}	3 May 2009	Mount Lemmon Survey	Mount Lemmon	5.194	0.152	22.5	4.403	5.986	10 km	–	catalog · MPC · JPL
(630120) 2005 BN_{55}	27 July 2011	Pan-STARRS	Haleakala	5.270	0.045	4.1	5.031	5.510	7.4 km	–	catalog · MPC · JPL
(630155) 2005 EG_{336}	17 September 2012	Mount Lemmon Survey	Mount Lemmon	5.236	0.184	2.4	4.271	6.201	7.7 km	–	catalog · MPC · JPL
(630183) 2005 GP_{193}	10 April 2005	Kitt Peak Obs.	Kitt Peak	5.233	0.099	12.5	4.715	5.751	7.3 km	–	catalog · MPC · JPL
(630584) 2006 BO_{248}	31 January 2006	Spacewatch	Kitt Peak	5.191	0.089	14.2	4.731	5.651	9.0 km	–	catalog · MPC · JPL
(630593) 2006 BA_{297}	30 January 2006	Spacewatch	Kitt Peak	5.342	0.046	9.6	5.096	5.587	7.3 km	–	catalog · MPC · JPL
(630594) 2006 BC_{297}	26 January 2006	Spacewatch	Kitt Peak	5.218	0.010	13.5	5.164	5.273	7.9 km	–	catalog · MPC · JPL
(630595) 2006 BN_{297}	26 January 2006	Mount Lemmon Survey	Mount Lemmon	5.233	0.079	6.8	4.821	5.645	8.8 km	–	catalog · MPC · JPL
(630607) 2006 CB_{87}	27 November 2014	Pan-STARRS	Haleakala	5.169	0.054	10.6	4.890	5.448	6.9 km	–	catalog · MPC · JPL
(631371) 2007 DW_{94}	23 February 2007	Spacewatch	Kitt Peak	5.106	0.019	23.2	5.011	5.201	8.2 km	–	catalog · MPC · JPL
(631398) 2007 EL_{55}	12 March 2007	Mount Lemmon Survey	Mount Lemmon	5.167	0.031	20.2	5.005	5.329	7.7 km	–	catalog · MPC · JPL
(631438) 2007 ES_{225}	23 May 2001	J. L. Elliot; L. H. Wasserman	Cerro Tololo	5.132	0.049	3.9	4.880	5.384	7.9 km	–	catalog · MPC · JPL
(631453) 2007 FV_{13}	19 March 2007	Mount Lemmon Survey	Mount Lemmon	5.157	0.085	10.3	4.720	5.593	6.9 km	–	catalog · MPC · JPL
(631460) 2007 FJ_{54}	16 March 2007	Spacewatch	Kitt Peak	5.169	0.021	27.3	5.062	5.277	6.5 km	–	catalog · MPC · JPL
(631479) 2007 HT_{9}	18 April 2007	Mount Lemmon Survey	Mount Lemmon	5.240	0.071	3.0	4.870	5.610	6.8 km	–	catalog · MPC · JPL
(631513) 2007 JZ_{9}	13 March 2007	Mount Lemmon Survey	Mount Lemmon	5.170	0.047	31.7	4.925	5.414	9.6 km	–	catalog · MPC · JPL
(632218) 2008 CC_{238}	9 February 2008	Mount Lemmon Survey	Mount Lemmon	5.196	0.077	32.4	4.795	5.596	8.8 km	–	catalog · MPC · JPL
(632340) 2008 FK_{40}	4 March 2008	Mount Lemmon Survey	Mount Lemmon	5.211	0.099	14.0	4.695	5.727	7.4 km	–	catalog · MPC · JPL
(632365) 2008 FB_{133}	13 November 2002	Spacewatch	Kitt Peak	5.133	0.059	18.1	4.831	5.434	7.4 km	–	catalog · MPC · JPL
(632370) 2008 FK_{139}	29 March 2008	Spacewatch	Kitt Peak	5.120	0.066	16.0	4.781	5.458	7.2 km	–	catalog · MPC · JPL
(632377) 2008 FN_{145}	30 March 2008	Spacewatch	Kitt Peak	5.241	0.082	15.6	4.812	5.670	8.5 km	–	catalog · MPC · JPL
(632384) 2008 GQ_{14}	17 January 2005	Spacewatch	Kitt Peak	5.259	0.051	11.6	4.992	5.526	8.2 km	–	catalog · MPC · JPL
(632389) 2008 GG_{32}	24 November 2003	Kitt Peak Obs.	Kitt Peak	5.247	0.091	10.6	4.768	5.725	7.6 km	–	catalog · MPC · JPL
(632398) 2008 GT_{66}	29 March 2008	Spacewatch	Kitt Peak	5.222	0.077	14.9	4.822	5.622	10 km	–	catalog · MPC · JPL
(632416) 2008 GN_{132}	13 April 2008	Mount Lemmon Survey	Mount Lemmon	5.296	0.017	24.9	5.207	5.385	11 km	–	catalog · MPC · JPL
(632417) 2008 GR_{143}	9 April 2008	Spacewatch	Kitt Peak	5.245	0.102	22.1	4.712	5.779	7.9 km	–	catalog · MPC · JPL
(632418) 2008 GU_{143}	14 April 2008	Mount Lemmon Survey	Mount Lemmon	5.250	0.081	12.6	4.826	5.674	7.2 km	–	catalog · MPC · JPL
(632434) 2008 GT_{167}	15 April 2008	Mount Lemmon Survey	Mount Lemmon	5.213	0.102	5.1	4.682	5.743	6.8 km	–	catalog · MPC · JPL
(632436) 2008 GT_{168}	11 April 2008	Mount Lemmon Survey	Mount Lemmon	5.255	0.072	17.1	4.878	5.632	7.7 km	–	catalog · MPC · JPL
(632438) 2008 GB_{171}	6 April 2008	Mount Lemmon Survey	Mount Lemmon	5.239	0.043	6.6	5.014	5.464	6.6 km	–	catalog · MPC · JPL
(632439) 2008 GQ_{171}	6 April 2008	Spacewatch	Kitt Peak	5.244	0.033	8.4	5.072	5.416	7.2 km	–	catalog · MPC · JPL
(632453) 2008 HD_{31}	19 March 2007	Mount Lemmon Survey	Mount Lemmon	5.248	0.057	13.6	4.951	5.546	9.4 km	–	catalog · MPC · JPL
(632466) 2008 HJ_{72}	13 October 2013	Mount Lemmon Survey	Mount Lemmon	5.132	0.054	12.9	4.857	5.408	8.3 km	–	catalog · MPC · JPL
(632471) 2008 JX_{3}	16 April 2008	Mount Lemmon Survey	Mount Lemmon	5.155	0.012	20.9	5.094	5.216	10 km	–	catalog · MPC · JPL
(632472) 2008 JC_{11}	3 May 2008	Spacewatch	Kitt Peak	5.290	0.064	12.4	4.950	5.630	8.7 km	–	catalog · MPC · JPL
(632476) 2008 JG_{41}	21 February 2007	Spacewatch	Kitt Peak	5.226	0.149	9.1	4.448	6.003	8.7 km	–	catalog · MPC · JPL
(632488) 2008 KQ_{18}	4 February 2005	Mount Lemmon Survey	Mount Lemmon	5.300	0.027	17.9	5.155	5.446	9.2 km	–	catalog · MPC · JPL
(632489) 2008 KM_{19}	4 April 2008	Spacewatch	Kitt Peak	5.215	0.055	10.6	4.927	5.503	8.9 km	–	catalog · MPC · JPL
(632503) 2008 KR_{43}	1 November 2013	Mount Lemmon Survey	Mount Lemmon	5.223	0.059	9.4	4.915	5.532	8.0 km	–	catalog · MPC · JPL
(633193) 2009 GV	3 April 2009	Alianza S4 Obs.	Cerro Burek	5.140	0.096	19.2	4.647	5.632	8.7 km	–	catalog · MPC · JPL
(633252) 2009 HH_{111}	21 April 2009	Spacewatch	Kitt Peak	5.145	0.092	12.1	4.672	5.618	9.9 km	–	catalog · MPC · JPL
(633261) 2009 JG_{23}	15 May 2009	Mount Lemmon Survey	Mount Lemmon	5.212	0.108	19.1	4.648	5.775	7.7 km	–	catalog · MPC · JPL
(633275) 2009 KD_{39}	6 September 2013	Mount Lemmon Survey	Mount Lemmon	5.143	0.042	9.9	4.925	5.361	6.7 km	–	catalog · MPC · JPL
(633279) 2009 LE_{7}	4 June 2009	Mount Lemmon Survey	Mount Lemmon	5.132	0.096	29.3	4.638	5.626	12 km	–	catalog · MPC · JPL
(633280) 2009 LN_{7}	11 October 2013	S. Mottola; S. Hellmich	Calar Alto-CASADO	5.179	0.038	11.1	4.984	5.373	8.0 km	–	catalog · MPC · JPL
(633872) 2010 HD_{1}	10 March 2007	Spacewatch	Kitt Peak	5.185	0.039	11.8	4.983	5.388	9.3 km	–	catalog · MPC · JPL
(633873) 2010 HN_{24}	18 April 2010	WISE	Mount Lemmon	5.130	0.057	20.5	4.838	5.422	9.6 km	–	catalog · MPC · JPL
(633877) 2010 HH_{116}	29 May 2009	Mount Lemmon Survey	Mount Lemmon	5.221	0.180	16.0	4.284	6.158	7.2 km	–	catalog · MPC · JPL
(633892) 2010 KB	16 May 2010	Mount Lemmon Survey	Mount Lemmon	5.211	0.070	21.4	4.847	5.574	11 km	–	catalog · MPC · JPL
(633899) 2010 LR_{158}	22 November 2014	Pan-STARRS	Haleakala	5.175	0.085	16.9	4.733	5.618	8.5 km	–	catalog · MPC · JPL
(633905) 2010 NC_{147}	21 June 2010	Mount Lemmon Survey	Mount Lemmon	5.198	0.091	7.4	4.724	5.671	8.7 km	–	catalog · MPC · JPL
(633906) 2010 NH_{147}	8 October 2012	Mount Lemmon Survey	Mount Lemmon	5.200	0.079	8.6	4.790	5.610	7.9 km	–	catalog · MPC · JPL
(633907) 2010 NU_{147}	4 July 2010	Mount Lemmon Survey	Mount Lemmon	5.255	0.092	10.7	4.772	5.738	9.9 km	–	catalog · MPC · JPL
(634347) 2011 KS_{21}	31 May 2011	Mount Lemmon Survey	Mount Lemmon	5.216	0.058	19.2	4.911	5.520	9.5 km	–	catalog · MPC · JPL
(634371) 2011 OP_{3}	22 July 2011	Pan-STARRS	Haleakala	5.195	0.091	19.7	4.724	5.666	9.5 km	–	catalog · MPC · JPL
(634380) 2011 OH_{60}	3 January 2016	Mount Lemmon Survey	Mount Lemmon	5.254	0.092	10.1	4.769	5.740	6.7 km	–	catalog · MPC · JPL
(634381) 2011 OY_{60}	10 March 2005	Mount Lemmon Survey	Mount Lemmon	5.175	0.053	12.7	4.903	5.447	7.7 km	–	catalog · MPC · JPL
(634383) 2011 OG_{68}	3 October 2013	Pan-STARRS	Haleakala	5.146	0.054	6.9	4.870	5.423	6.0 km	–	catalog · MPC · JPL
(634385) 2011 OQ_{73}	27 July 2011	Pan-STARRS	Haleakala	5.222	0.117	4.1	4.612	5.833	6.8 km	–	catalog · MPC · JPL
(634392) 2011 PE_{17}	21 October 2001	Spacewatch	Kitt Peak	5.226	0.103	11.8	4.689	5.764	8.0 km	–	catalog · MPC · JPL
(634393) 2011 PH_{20}	4 January 2016	Pan-STARRS	Haleakala	5.111	0.049	15.0	4.858	5.363	6.2 km	–	catalog · MPC · JPL
(634394) 2011 QD_{1}	19 August 2011	Pan-STARRS	Haleakala	5.213	0.062	17.2	4.889	5.537	6.4 km	–	catalog · MPC · JPL
(634400) 2011 QK_{38}	24 August 2011	Pan-STARRS	Haleakala	5.318	0.042	1.9	5.095	5.540	8.0 km	–	catalog · MPC · JPL
(634418) 2011 RW_{6}	5 September 2011	Pan-STARRS	Haleakala	5.276	0.052	8.2	5.003	5.549	7.0 km	–	catalog · MPC · JPL
(634428) 2011 ST_{21}	20 September 2011	Pan-STARRS	Haleakala	5.283	0.103	21.3	4.738	5.828	10 km	–	catalog · MPC · JPL
(634445) 2011 SR_{71}	24 September 2011	Pan-STARRS	Haleakala	5.225	0.047	17.1	4.982	5.468	15 km	–	catalog · MPC · JPL
(634480) 2011 SP_{283}	20 September 2011	Pan-STARRS	Haleakala	5.371	0.023	7.6	5.250	5.493	7.3 km	–	catalog · MPC · JPL
(634482) 2011 SY_{284}	26 October 2013	Mount Lemmon Survey	Mount Lemmon	5.217	0.043	20.7	4.993	5.440	10 km	–	catalog · MPC · JPL
(634483) 2011 SC_{295}	9 October 2012	Mount Lemmon Survey	Mount Lemmon	5.224	0.075	10.3	4.834	5.614	7.9 km	–	catalog · MPC · JPL
(634808) 2012 PD_{52}	13 August 2012	L. Bernasconi	Les Engarouines	5.142	0.075	27.8	4.754	5.529	7.7 km	–	catalog · MPC · JPL
(634828) 2012 QK_{76}	26 August 2012	Spacewatch	Kitt Peak	5.176	0.060	17.6	4.864	5.488	8.5 km	–	catalog · MPC · JPL
(634830) 2012 RW_{1}	12 December 2004	Spacewatch	Kitt Peak	5.121	0.071	5.5	4.760	5.483	12 km	–	catalog · MPC · JPL
(634840) 2012 SD_{3}	9 March 2005	Mount Lemmon Survey	Mount Lemmon	5.141	0.035	11.5	4.962	5.319	12 km	–	catalog · MPC · JPL
(634846) 2012 SX_{12}	17 September 2012	Mount Lemmon Survey	Mount Lemmon	5.125	0.039	26.8	4.928	5.323	7.2 km	–	catalog · MPC · JPL
(634856) 2012 SW_{29}	23 September 2001	Spacewatch	Kitt Peak	5.230	0.015	15.6	5.150	5.311	9.1 km	–	catalog · MPC · JPL
(634864) 2012 SF_{67}	16 September 2012	Spacewatch	Kitt Peak	5.210	0.135	4.8	4.509	5.912	7.1 km	–	catalog · MPC · JPL
(634866) 2012 SX_{73}	25 September 2012	Mount Lemmon Survey	Mount Lemmon	5.273	0.053	15.2	4.992	5.554	7.2 km	–	catalog · MPC · JPL
(634870) 2012 TW_{4}	5 October 2012	Pan-STARRS	Haleakala	5.164	0.116	21.2	4.565	5.762	9.0 km	–	catalog · MPC · JPL
(634872) 2012 TQ_{13}	24 September 2000	LINEAR	Socorro	5.291	0.054	11.5	5.004	5.579	13 km	–	catalog · MPC · JPL
(634873) 2012 TO_{14}	7 October 2012	Pan-STARRS	Haleakala	5.266	0.008	19.4	5.221	5.311	7.8 km	–	catalog · MPC · JPL
(634875) 2012 TC_{20}	7 October 2012	Pan-STARRS	Haleakala	5.164	0.065	19.3	4.830	5.499	11 km	–	catalog · MPC · JPL
(634878) 2012 TG_{35}	8 October 2012	J. M. Bosch; R. M. Olivera	SM Montmagastrell	5.223	0.053	9.5	4.948	5.498	7.3 km	–	catalog · MPC · JPL
(634881) 2012 TQ_{52}	9 October 2012	Mount Lemmon Survey	Mount Lemmon	5.272	0.089	5.0	4.803	5.741	7.4 km	–	catalog · MPC · JPL
(634884) 2012 TG_{78}	21 December 2003	Spacewatch	Kitt Peak	5.310	0.029	7.1	5.157	5.463	8.1 km	–	catalog · MPC · JPL
(634885) 2012 TS_{79}	13 October 2001	Spacewatch	Kitt Peak	5.276	0.092	19.4	4.791	5.761	8.3 km	–	catalog · MPC · JPL
(634889) 2012 TV_{88}	6 October 2012	Mount Lemmon Survey	Mount Lemmon	5.220	0.078	28.2	4.811	5.629	7.5 km	–	catalog · MPC · JPL
(634895) 2012 TX_{122}	8 October 2012	Pan-STARRS	Haleakala	5.263	0.082	19.1	4.830	5.696	9.4 km	–	catalog · MPC · JPL
(634896) 2012 TB_{123}	13 June 2011	Mount Lemmon Survey	Mount Lemmon	5.195	0.079	11.4	4.782	5.608	8.5 km	–	catalog · MPC · JPL
(634898) 2012 TP_{128}	27 October 2000	Spacewatch	Kitt Peak	5.301	0.087	23.2	4.841	5.761	10 km	–	catalog · MPC · JPL
(634899) 2012 TL_{144}	10 October 2012	Mount Lemmon Survey	Mount Lemmon	5.210	0.085	19.3	4.766	5.654	8.5 km	–	catalog · MPC · JPL
(634902) 2012 TA_{158}	5 May 2008	Mount Lemmon Survey	Mount Lemmon	5.242	0.095	7.3	4.745	5.739	7.1 km	–	catalog · MPC · JPL
(634907) 2012 TM_{173}	9 October 2012	Mount Lemmon Survey	Mount Lemmon	5.215	0.099	5.3	4.699	5.731	6.8 km	–	catalog · MPC · JPL
(634909) 2012 TO_{174}	9 October 2012	Mount Lemmon Survey	Mount Lemmon	5.181	0.056	14.8	4.893	5.470	7.4 km	–	catalog · MPC · JPL
(634910) 2012 TD_{177}	16 May 2010	Mount Lemmon Survey	Mount Lemmon	5.231	0.096	12.7	4.730	5.733	7.5 km	–	catalog · MPC · JPL
(634926) 2012 TJ_{233}	26 February 2007	Mount Lemmon Survey	Mount Lemmon	5.247	0.043	14.5	5.023	5.472	9.2 km	–	catalog · MPC · JPL
(634927) 2012 TX_{235}	11 November 2001	SDSS Collaboration	Apache Point	5.208	0.107	15.8	4.653	5.763	6.3 km	–	catalog · MPC · JPL
(634936) 2012 TQ_{263}	8 October 2012	Mount Lemmon Survey	Mount Lemmon	5.283	0.041	4.8	5.068	5.499	7.8 km	–	catalog · MPC · JPL
(634962) 2012 TA_{332}	11 October 2012	Mount Lemmon Survey	Mount Lemmon	5.260	0.095	8.5	4.763	5.758	8.8 km	–	catalog · MPC · JPL
(634964) 2012 TL_{355}	9 October 2012	Pan-STARRS	Haleakala	5.240	0.069	9.9	4.881	5.600	6.4 km	–	catalog · MPC · JPL
(634965) 2012 TC_{364}	8 October 2012	Mount Lemmon Survey	Mount Lemmon	5.201	0.071	7.5	4.831	5.571	8.0 km	–	catalog · MPC · JPL
(634974) 2012 UH_{15}	16 October 2012	Mount Lemmon Survey	Mount Lemmon	5.327	0.029	15.7	5.173	5.482	7.4 km	–	catalog · MPC · JPL
(635033) 2012 VQ_{5}	17 September 2012	Mount Lemmon Survey	Mount Lemmon	5.132	0.078	7.0	4.733	5.530	7.4 km	–	catalog · MPC · JPL
(635060) 2012 VG_{124}	31 January 2017	Pan-STARRS	Haleakala	5.236	0.024	9.3	5.110	5.362	7.4 km	–	catalog · MPC · JPL
(635102) 2012 XV_{111}	31 October 2005	Mauna Kea Obs.	Mauna Kea	5.207	0.023	30.0	5.085	5.328	10 km	–	catalog · MPC · JPL
(635499) 2013 RG_{110}	13 September 2013	Mount Lemmon Survey	Mount Lemmon	5.190	0.074	1.0	4.804	5.575	6.0 km	–	catalog · MPC · JPL
(635529) 2013 TA_{45}	20 October 2001	Spacewatch	Kitt Peak	5.216	0.069	10.0	4.857	5.576	11 km	–	catalog · MPC · JPL
(635555) 2013 TP_{204}	7 October 2013	Spacewatch	Kitt Peak	5.148	0.045	20.4	4.918	5.377	8.3 km	–	catalog · MPC · JPL
(635558) 2013 TN_{221}	13 October 2013	Mount Lemmon Survey	Mount Lemmon	5.250	0.055	10.0	4.959	5.541	6.5 km	–	catalog · MPC · JPL
(635563) 2013 UT_{33}	20 November 2001	Spacewatch	Kitt Peak	5.285	0.110	12.3	4.703	5.866	8.7 km	–	catalog · MPC · JPL
(635567) 2013 VZ_{57}	9 November 2013	Pan-STARRS	Haleakala	5.256	0.093	16.1	4.765	5.747	8.8 km	–	catalog · MPC · JPL
(635571) 2013 VW_{75}	4 November 2013	Mount Lemmon Survey	Mount Lemmon	5.145	0.049	11.9	4.894	5.396	6.1 km	–	catalog · MPC · JPL
(635574) 2013 WA_{4}	25 August 2012	Pan-STARRS	Haleakala	5.165	0.122	20.5	4.535	5.795	11 km	–	catalog · MPC · JPL
(636387) 2014 RR_{78}	4 September 2014	Pan-STARRS	Haleakala	5.147	0.020	13.9	5.043	5.250	6.1 km	–	catalog · MPC · JPL
(636527) 2014 SR_{384}	2 October 2013	Pan-STARRS	Haleakala	5.090	0.090	26.7	4.630	5.551	7.4 km	–	catalog · MPC · JPL
(636575) 2014 UP_{41}	27 February 2006	Spacewatch	Kitt Peak	5.234	0.098	5.6	4.721	5.746	7.9 km	–	catalog · MPC · JPL
(636638) 2014 UQ_{225}	24 April 2009	Alianza S4 Obs.	Cerro Burek	5.126	0.011	7.9	5.070	5.182	7.7 km	–	catalog · MPC · JPL
(636653) 2014 VB_{26}	17 September 2012	M. Schwartz; P. R. Holvorcem	Nogales	5.096	0.039	22.1	4.897	5.295	11 km	–	catalog · MPC · JPL
(636658) 2014 WB	9 February 2005	A. Boattini	La Silla	5.227	0.069	11.1	4.866	5.588	11 km	–	catalog · MPC · JPL
(636667) 2014 WM_{24}	8 April 2008	Spacewatch	Kitt Peak	5.157	0.081	17.6	4.741	5.574	8.2 km	–	catalog · MPC · JPL
(636695) 2014 WN_{120}	21 November 2014	Mount Lemmon Survey	Mount Lemmon	5.185	0.080	14.4	4.772	5.598	8.8 km	–	catalog · MPC · JPL
(636698) 2014 WO_{130}	21 October 2014	Mount Lemmon Survey	Mount Lemmon	5.169	0.093	13.5	4.686	5.651	9.4 km	–	catalog · MPC · JPL
(636700) 2014 WE_{132}	17 November 2014	Pan-STARRS	Haleakala	5.181	0.129	13.1	4.513	5.849	7.7 km	–	catalog · MPC · JPL
(636739) 2014 WK_{225}	3 October 2013	Mount Lemmon Survey	Mount Lemmon	5.233	0.023	4.8	5.113	5.353	7.2 km	–	catalog · MPC · JPL
(636794) 2014 WW_{386}	24 August 2012	Spacewatch	Kitt Peak	5.158	0.046	7.8	4.923	5.394	6.5 km	–	catalog · MPC · JPL
(636818) 2014 WS_{465}	20 October 2014	Mount Lemmon Survey	Mount Lemmon	5.254	0.083	15.1	4.817	5.691	8.5 km	–	catalog · MPC · JPL
(636835) 2014 WJ_{511}	22 November 2014	Pan-STARRS	Haleakala	5.212	0.008	12.3	5.172	5.252	6.7 km	–	catalog · MPC · JPL
(636846) 2014 WQ_{574}	24 November 2014	Pan-STARRS	Haleakala	5.168	0.050	15.6	4.912	5.425	7.2 km	–	catalog · MPC · JPL
(636848) 2014 WC_{576}	17 November 2014	Pan-STARRS	Haleakala	5.106	0.058	5.6	4.811	5.401	6.5 km	–	catalog · MPC · JPL
(636849) 2014 WC_{580}	17 November 2014	Pan-STARRS	Haleakala	5.230	0.066	5.0	4.885	5.575	6.5 km	–	catalog · MPC · JPL
(636856) 2014 XH_{16}	16 November 2014	Mount Lemmon Survey	Mount Lemmon	5.127	0.057	14.5	4.834	5.420	8.3 km	–	catalog · MPC · JPL
(636937) 2015 AS_{259}	2 December 2014	Pan-STARRS	Haleakala	5.239	0.029	31.7	5.086	5.391	10 km	–	catalog · MPC · JPL
(636938) 2015 AV_{259}	21 September 2012	Mount Lemmon Survey	Mount Lemmon	5.187	0.079	14.7	4.779	5.594	7.0 km	–	catalog · MPC · JPL
(636952) 2015 AH_{292}	15 January 2015	Pan-STARRS	Haleakala	5.143	0.051	20.5	4.883	5.404	7.1 km	–	catalog · MPC · JPL
(637132) 2015 BM_{555}	17 January 2015	Pan-STARRS	Haleakala	5.165	0.084	23.0	4.734	5.597	7.9 km	–	catalog · MPC · JPL
(638421) 2016 AR_{13}	12 November 2001	SDSS Collaboration	Apache Point	5.260	0.094	16.6	4.764	5.755	7.7 km	–	catalog · MPC · JPL
(638492) 2016 AR_{195}	14 April 2008	Mount Lemmon Survey	Mount Lemmon	5.219	0.015	13.8	5.141	5.297	7.5 km	–	catalog · MPC · JPL
(638542) 2016 AP_{311}	1 January 2016	Mount Lemmon Survey	Mount Lemmon	5.279	0.096	21.4	4.775	5.784	8.1 km	–	catalog · MPC · JPL
(638544) 2016 AC_{355}	8 November 2013	Mount Lemmon Survey	Mount Lemmon	5.115	0.037	13.6	4.928	5.302	6.5 km	–	catalog · MPC · JPL
(638547) 2016 AK_{375}	29 November 2014	Mount Lemmon Survey	Mount Lemmon	5.116	0.056	5.2	4.829	5.402	5.8 km	–	catalog · MPC · JPL
(638570) 2016 BS_{49}	11 October 1999	C. J. Pritchet	Mauna Kea	5.291	0.012	11.7	5.228	5.353	8.4 km	–	catalog · MPC · JPL
(639234) 2017 AM	2 January 2017	Pan-STARRS	Haleakala	5.140	0.047	14.4	4.897	5.383	7.6 km	–	catalog · MPC · JPL
(639250) 2017 AC_{47}	8 January 2017	Mount Lemmon Survey	Mount Lemmon	5.243	0.055	17.5	4.956	5.530	7.7 km	–	catalog · MPC · JPL
(639268) 2017 BD_{32}	7 May 2008	Spacewatch	Kitt Peak	5.245	0.029	22.0	5.094	5.396	8.6 km	–	catalog · MPC · JPL
(639276) 2017 BX_{51}	26 January 2017	Mount Lemmon Survey	Mount Lemmon	5.209	0.047	13.1	4.963	5.455	7.6 km	–	catalog · MPC · JPL
(639298) 2017 BF_{80}	30 April 2008	Spacewatch	Kitt Peak	5.325	0.061	14.2	5.000	5.650	7.7 km	–	catalog · MPC · JPL
(639314) 2017 BU_{109}	9 October 2012	Pan-STARRS	Haleakala	5.182	0.089	11.2	4.721	5.644	8.3 km	–	catalog · MPC · JPL
(639317) 2017 BO_{120}	25 June 2011	Mount Lemmon Survey	Mount Lemmon	5.110	0.089	15.9	4.655	5.565	8.9 km	–	catalog · MPC · JPL
(639332) 2017 BR_{144}	22 September 2012	Mount Lemmon Survey	Mount Lemmon	5.174	0.031	9.2	5.014	5.333	6.9 km	–	catalog · MPC · JPL
(639335) 2017 BF_{159}	20 January 2017	Pan-STARRS	Haleakala	5.287	0.016	31.4	5.204	5.371	6.6 km	–	catalog · MPC · JPL
(639336) 2017 BR_{160}	14 April 2008	Mount Lemmon Survey	Mount Lemmon	5.266	0.027	15.6	5.125	5.407	7.2 km	–	catalog · MPC · JPL
(639339) 2017 BE_{181}	29 January 2017	Pan-STARRS	Haleakala	5.166	0.080	10.6	4.753	5.578	6.0 km	–	catalog · MPC · JPL
(639353) 2017 CP_{22}	14 August 2012	Spacewatch	Kitt Peak	5.198	0.051	11.4	4.935	5.461	9.0 km	–	catalog · MPC · JPL
(639385) 2017 DF_{23}	27 January 2017	Pan-STARRS	Haleakala	5.245	0.039	10.0	5.043	5.447	6.2 km	–	catalog · MPC · JPL
(639397) 2017 DF_{37}	30 April 2008	Mount Lemmon Survey	Mount Lemmon	5.292	0.045	27.8	5.055	5.530	11 km	–	catalog · MPC · JPL
(639867) 2018 AX_{26}	14 January 2018	Pan-STARRS	Haleakala	5.234	0.093	16.1	4.750	5.718	8.9 km	–	catalog · MPC · JPL
(639868) 2018 AA_{30}	12 January 2018	Pan-STARRS	Haleakala	5.183	0.092	14.8	4.707	5.659	7.0 km	–	catalog · MPC · JPL
(639872) 2018 BK_{19}	16 January 2018	Pan-STARRS	Haleakala	5.261	0.173	17.5	4.352	6.171	6.9 km	–	catalog · MPC · JPL
(640336) 2000 SA_{385}	26 August 2012	Pan-STARRS	Haleakala	5.126	0.194	10.4	4.130	6.122	7.2 km	–	catalog · MPC · JPL
(641171) 2003 BU_{101}	14 June 2010	Mount Lemmon Survey	Mount Lemmon	5.177	0.040	28.8	4.969	5.386	10 km	–	catalog · MPC · JPL
(643471) 2006 CM_{86}	9 January 2016	Pan-STARRS	Haleakala	5.263	0.022	27.8	5.146	5.379	8.6 km	–	catalog · MPC · JPL
(645161) 2007 EC_{235}	11 May 2008	Mount Lemmon Survey	Mount Lemmon	5.289	0.089	27.7	4.817	5.761	7.5 km	–	catalog · MPC · JPL
(646898) 2008 GY_{153}	15 April 2008	Spacewatch	Kitt Peak	5.133	0.060	28.2	4.825	5.440	8.7 km	–	catalog · MPC · JPL
(648121) 2009 JG_{4}	29 April 2008	Mount Lemmon Survey	Mount Lemmon	5.210	0.041	9.7	4.998	5.422	9.0 km	–	catalog · MPC · JPL
(648864) 2010 NM_{118}	3 December 2014	Pan-STARRS	Haleakala	5.288	0.070	29.5	4.918	5.659	8.9 km	–	catalog · MPC · JPL
(649569) 2011 LT_{34}	11 June 2011	Pan-STARRS	Haleakala	5.279	0.070	27.2	4.909	5.649	7.1 km	–	catalog · MPC · JPL
(649690) 2011 RF_{14}	4 September 2011	Spacewatch	Kitt Peak	5.205	0.092	28.6	4.728	5.683	6.4 km	–	catalog · MPC · JPL
(650629) 2012 TH_{5}	5 October 2012	Pan-STARRS	Haleakala	5.225	0.059	26.5	4.915	5.534	9.0 km	–	catalog · MPC · JPL
(652015) 2013 RQ_{53}	28 September 2001	NEAT	Palomar	5.219	0.082	23.3	4.791	5.646	11 km	–	catalog · MPC · JPL
(652200) 2013 VC_{34}	9 November 2013	Pan-STARRS	Haleakala	5.230	0.089	10.5	4.763	5.697	7.1 km	–	catalog · MPC · JPL
(653838) 2014 UM_{94}	22 October 2014	Mount Lemmon Survey	Mount Lemmon	5.113	0.045	29.1	4.881	5.345	9.4 km	–	catalog · MPC · JPL
(658981) 2018 FZ_{54}	11 October 2012	Mount Lemmon Survey	Mount Lemmon	5.217	0.054	9.4	4.936	5.497	7.0 km	–	catalog · MPC · JPL
(659443) 2019 CK_{27}	26 July 2011	Pan-STARRS	Haleakala	5.181	0.072	9.8	4.806	5.555	9.2 km	–	catalog · MPC · JPL
(659464) 2019 FB_{17}	29 March 2019	Mount Lemmon Survey	Mount Lemmon	5.143	0.050	28.0	4.888	5.399	7.0 km	–	catalog · MPC · JPL
(659467) 2019 GD_{6}	10 November 2016	Pan-STARRS	Haleakala	5.197	0.066	29.9	4.853	5.541	10 km	–	catalog · MPC · JPL
(659477) 2019 GA_{21}	2 April 2005	Mount Lemmon Survey	Mount Lemmon	5.250	0.038	33.7	5.051	5.448	8.4 km	–	catalog · MPC · JPL
(659503) 2019 JB_{13}	8 April 2008	Spacewatch	Kitt Peak	5.203	0.052	8.3	4.930	5.476	8.5 km	–	catalog · MPC · JPL
(659728) 2020 GX_{20}	12 September 2001	L. H. Wasserman; E. L. Ryan	Kitt Peak	5.169	0.077	4.4	4.770	5.567	7.2 km	–	catalog · MPC · JPL
(659736) 2020 HA_{21}	29 April 2008	Spacewatch	Kitt Peak	5.217	0.015	12.8	5.139	5.294	7.1 km	–	catalog · MPC · JPL
(660459) 2001 TS_{268}	10 March 2008	Mount Lemmon Survey	Mount Lemmon	5.186	0.085	12.7	4.746	5.626	7.9 km	–	catalog · MPC · JPL
(660480) 2001 UE_{240}	11 April 2008	Mount Lemmon Survey	Mount Lemmon	5.181	0.117	14.3	4.574	5.787	8.3 km	–	catalog · MPC · JPL
(661195) 2003 YK_{157}	24 November 2003	Spacewatch	Kitt Peak	5.173	0.057	22.2	4.879	5.466	11 km	–	catalog · MPC · JPL
(661994) 2005 TJ_{198}	7 October 2005	Mauna Kea Obs.	Mauna Kea	5.083	0.064	6.1	4.758	5.408	7.5 km	–	catalog · MPC · JPL
(662397) 2006 BY_{108}	25 January 2006	Spacewatch	Kitt Peak	5.170	0.062	28.5	4.848	5.491	8.8 km	–	catalog · MPC · JPL
(662428) 2006 BQ_{295}	3 May 2008	Spacewatch	Kitt Peak	5.156	0.010	10.1	5.107	5.205	6.9 km	–	catalog · MPC · JPL
(662454) 2006 CG_{85}	2 February 2006	Spacewatch	Kitt Peak	5.174	0.047	20.1	4.929	5.419	7.4 km	–	catalog · MPC · JPL
(662457) 2006 CG_{89}	1 February 2006	Spacewatch	Kitt Peak	5.155	0.006	19.8	5.126	5.184	8.0 km	–	catalog · MPC · JPL
(662480) 2006 DK_{167}	27 February 2006	Spacewatch	Kitt Peak	5.262	0.018	30.1	5.165	5.360	8.2 km	–	catalog · MPC · JPL
(664158) 2008 EE_{190}	12 March 2008	Spacewatch	Kitt Peak	5.174	0.074	4.9	4.789	5.558	7.9 km	–	catalog · MPC · JPL
(664320) 2008 HW_{31}	29 March 2008	Spacewatch	Kitt Peak	5.202	0.151	4.5	4.418	5.985	5.7 km	–	catalog · MPC · JPL
(664345) 2008 HM_{77}	28 April 2008	Spacewatch	Kitt Peak	5.272	0.137	12.1	4.551	5.994	6.8 km	–	catalog · MPC · JPL
(665413) 2009 HF_{125}	29 April 2009	Spacewatch	Kitt Peak	5.183	0.209	14.3	4.098	6.268	7.1 km	–	catalog · MPC · JPL
(665421) 2009 KS_{5}	18 April 2009	Spacewatch	Kitt Peak	5.210	0.024	28.2	5.084	5.336	13 km	–	catalog · MPC · JPL
(667626) 2011 QL_{99}	14 December 2015	Pan-STARRS	Haleakala	5.233	0.082	8.7	4.804	5.662	6.3 km	–	catalog · MPC · JPL
(667642) 2011 QO_{114}	24 August 2011	Pan-STARRS	Haleakala	5.162	0.019	31.0	5.065	5.260	8.7 km	–	catalog · MPC · JPL
(667715) 2011 SL_{75}	20 September 2011	Mount Lemmon Survey	Mount Lemmon	5.270	0.113	14.0	4.673	5.867	5.8 km	–	catalog · MPC · JPL
(668973) 2012 PW_{53}	10 August 2012	Spacewatch	Kitt Peak	5.156	0.062	11.1	4.837	5.474	8.1 km	–	catalog · MPC · JPL
(669171) 2012 TJ_{176}	26 March 2007	Spacewatch	Kitt Peak	5.165	0.034	5.4	4.991	5.338	6.9 km	–	catalog · MPC · JPL
(669208) 2012 TP_{260}	9 June 2011	Mount Lemmon Survey	Mount Lemmon	5.164	0.120	19.6	4.545	5.783	6.6 km	–	catalog · MPC · JPL
(669265) 2012 TW_{369}	11 October 2012	Pan-STARRS	Haleakala	5.247	0.181	12.9	4.297	6.198	5.9 km	–	catalog · MPC · JPL
(670515) 2013 TB_{43}	24 February 2006	Mount Lemmon Survey	Mount Lemmon	5.206	0.051	11.4	4.940	5.472	9.3 km	–	catalog · MPC · JPL
(675700) 2015 YE_{36}	10 November 2013	Mount Lemmon Survey	Mount Lemmon	5.184	0.126	11.8	4.530	5.838	7.2 km	–	catalog · MPC · JPL
(675714) 2016 AR_{22}	3 January 2016	Pan-STARRS	Haleakala	5.302	0.015	19.1	5.222	5.382	7.1 km	–	catalog · MPC · JPL
(675718) 2016 AW_{28}	3 January 2016	Pan-STARRS	Haleakala	5.154	0.049	26.3	4.901	5.407	9.3 km	–	catalog · MPC · JPL
(675894) 2016 AL_{344}	5 January 2016	Pan-STARRS	Haleakala	5.296	0.067	17.7	4.941	5.651	8.3 km	–	catalog · MPC · JPL
(677712) 2017 BO_{210}	29 January 2017	Pan-STARRS	Haleakala	5.298	0.021	12.2	5.185	5.411	6.7 km	–	catalog · MPC · JPL
(679476) 2019 GX_{110}	3 April 2019	Pan-STARRS	Haleakala	5.233	0.123	8.0	4.588	5.877	6.5 km	–	catalog · MPC · JPL
(679542) 2019 NT_{3}	18 April 2010	WISE	WISE	5.121	0.060	30.2	4.814	5.427	8.9 km	–	catalog · MPC · JPL
(679857) 2021 HF_{4}	26 November 2014	Pan-STARRS	Haleakala	5.132	0.084	10.5	4.701	5.564	6.5 km	–	catalog · MPC · JPL
(680383) 2001 UN_{67}	20 October 2001	LINEAR	Socorro	5.246	0.132	6.5	4.553	5.940	8.0 km	–	catalog · MPC · JPL
(682211) 2006 EN_{76}	3 September 2013	Mount Lemmon Survey	Mount Lemmon	5.232	0.064	1.0	4.895	5.569	7.9 km	–	catalog · MPC · JPL
(682951) 2007 EV_{233}	11 May 2008	Mount Lemmon Survey	Mount Lemmon	5.202	0.107	22.5	4.646	5.758	7.0 km	–	catalog · MPC · JPL
(683972) 2008 GE_{45}	11 March 2007	Mount Lemmon Survey	Mount Lemmon	5.219	0.140	1.8	4.487	5.951	6.5 km	–	catalog · MPC · JPL
(684031) 2008 GN_{168}	3 April 2008	Mount Lemmon Survey	Mount Lemmon	5.258	0.031	11.0	5.096	5.419	7.7 km	–	catalog · MPC · JPL
(684164) 2008 LJ_{20}	21 November 2014	Pan-STARRS	Haleakala	5.177	0.021	14.5	5.069	5.284	6.5 km	–	catalog · MPC · JPL
(685202) 2009 JB_{14}	4 April 2008	Spacewatch	Kitt Peak	5.228	0.053	16.2	4.951	5.505	9.2 km	–	catalog · MPC · JPL
(685223) 2009 LJ_{3}	12 June 2009	Spacewatch	Kitt Peak	5.149	0.067	30.9	4.803	5.494	9.5 km	–	catalog · MPC · JPL
(685224) 2009 LN_{3}	12 June 2009	Spacewatch	Kitt Peak	5.168	0.055	18.2	4.884	5.453	9.0 km	–	catalog · MPC · JPL
(687154) 2011 QT_{47}	17 November 2014	Pan-STARRS	Haleakala	5.294	0.066	7.7	4.943	5.645	6.9 km	–	catalog · MPC · JPL
(687196) 2011 RF_{26}	2 September 2011	Pan-STARRS	Haleakala	5.235	0.058	17.9	4.930	5.541	7.1 km	–	catalog · MPC · JPL
(687211) 2011 SW_{12}	19 September 2011	Mount Lemmon Survey	Mount Lemmon	5.192	0.127	8.1	4.535	5.849	6.2 km	–	catalog · MPC · JPL
(688305) 2012 ST_{89}	21 September 2012	Mount Lemmon Survey	Mount Lemmon	5.193	0.065	16.1	4.853	5.533	5.9 km	–	catalog · MPC · JPL
(688674) 2012 VS_{124}	9 November 2013	Mount Lemmon Survey	Mount Lemmon	5.134	0.052	7.6	4.869	5.400	5.7 km	–	catalog · MPC · JPL
(689909) 2013 RY_{147}	14 September 2013	Spacewatch	Kitt Peak	5.207	0.097	2.8	4.702	5.712	7.0 km	–	catalog · MPC · JPL
(692423) 2014 WC_{387}	25 October 2013	Mount Lemmon Survey	Mount Lemmon	5.237	0.047	9.0	4.989	5.485	7.2 km	–	catalog · MPC · JPL
(692703) 2015 AT_{299}	14 January 2015	Pan-STARRS	Haleakala	5.209	0.079	24.9	4.800	5.619	7.4 km	–	catalog · MPC · JPL
(695628) 2016 AQ_{44}	3 December 2015	Mount Lemmon Survey	Mount Lemmon	5.173	0.066	16.9	4.831	5.515	8.5 km	–	catalog · MPC · JPL
(697256) 2017 AF_{35}	3 January 2017	Pan-STARRS	Haleakala	5.156	0.037	29.5	4.963	5.349	6.0 km	–	catalog · MPC · JPL
(698980) 2019 FX_{3}	9 October 2012	Mount Lemmon Survey	Mount Lemmon	5.239	0.110	6.7	4.663	5.815	8.3 km	–	catalog · MPC · JPL
(699007) 2019 GZ_{1}	15 May 2008	Mount Lemmon Survey	Mount Lemmon	5.251	0.126	23.9	4.592	5.910	9.9 km	–	catalog · MPC · JPL
(699009) 2019 GH_{6}	10 December 2014	Pan-STARRS	Haleakala	5.212	0.046	29.0	4.970	5.453	9.0 km	–	catalog · MPC · JPL
(699022) 2019 GY_{18}	15 January 2015	Pan-STARRS	Haleakala	5.219	0.051	30.7	4.954	5.484	9.0 km	–	catalog · MPC · JPL
(699457) 2020 HG_{14}	16 April 2020	Pan-STARRS 2	Haleakala	5.269	0.123	13.2	4.622	5.915	7.8 km	–	catalog · MPC · JPL
(699465) 2020 HJ_{20}	3 April 2008	Spacewatch	Kitt Peak	5.176	0.057	11.0	4.882	5.469	6.7 km	–	catalog · MPC · JPL
(699517) 2020 HT_{115}	21 April 2020	Pan-STARRS 2	Haleakala	5.230	0.082	8.2	4.801	5.660	6.8 km	–	catalog · MPC · JPL

back to top
