= Smithsonian Astrophysical Observatory Star Catalog =

Astrometric star catalogue

- Alternative names: SAO

The Smithsonian Astrophysical Observatory Star Catalog is an astrometric star catalogue, created by Smithsonian Institution, a research institute. It was published by the Smithsonian Astrophysical Observatory in 1966 and contains 258,997 stars. The catalogue was compiled from various previous astrometric catalogues, and contains only stars to about ninth magnitude for which accurate proper motions were known. Names in the SAO catalogue start with the letters SAO, followed by a number. The numbers are assigned following 18 ten-degree bands of declination, with stars sorted by right ascension within each band.

Online version of the SAO Catalog was created by the HEASARC in March 2001 based on ADC/CDS Catalog I/131A, which itself is originally derived from a character-coded machine-readable version of the Smithsonian Astrophysical Observatory Star Catalog (SAO, SAO Staff 1966) prepared by T.A. Nagy in 1979, and subsequently modified over the next decade or so.

== Examples of SAO catalogue entries ==
- SAO 67174 is Vega.
- SAO 113271 is Betelgeuse.
- SAO 40012 is HD 277559.
- SAO 158687 is the star that was occulted by Uranus in March 1977, leading to the discovery of rings around Uranus.
