= Amy B. Jordan (astronomer) =

American astronomer

Minor planets discovered: 3
see § List of discovered minor planets

Amy B. Jordan is an American astronomer and a discoverer of minor planets who works at the University of Colorado.

== Career ==
In 2002 she was part of the team which discovered (95625) 2002 GX32, a resonant Kuiper belt object at the Cerro Tololo Inter-American Observatory, Chile. She also co-discovered two main-belt asteroids. In 2005, she was a teaching assistant at the Summer Science Program, which teaches astronomy to high school students using a curriculum based on observing and calculating orbits of asteroids.

== List of discovered minor planets ==
(95625) 2002 GX32	8 April 2002	list^{[A]}^{[B]}
(543956) 2014 QQ_{387}	1 April 2003	list^{[A]}
(545187) 2011 BR_{93}	1 April 2003	list^{[A]}
Co-discovery made with:^{A} M. W. Buie^{B} J. L. Elliot

== See also ==
- List of minor planet discoverers § A. B. Jordan

== Publications ==
- Chiang, EI, Jordan, AB, (2002). On the Plutinos and Twotinos of the Kuiper belt.
- Chiang, EI, Jordan, AB, Millis, RL et al. (2003). Resonance occupation in the Kuiper belt: Case examples of the 5: 2 and Trojan resonances.
