= Jessica Mink =

American astronomer and theoretical computing

- Born: February 1951 (age 75); Lincoln, Nebraska
- Education: Massachusetts Institute of Technology (SB 1973, SM 1974)
- Known for: Discovery of rings of Uranus; developing RVSAO and WCSTools, two widely-used astronomy software packages
- Scientific career
- Fields: Planetary science and positional astronomy
- Workplaces: Smithsonian Astrophysical Observatory
- Thesis: "Determination of Martian Surface Reflectivity from 0.4 to 1.1 Micron Using a Vidicon Spectrometer" (1974)
- Website: https://www.jessicamink.com/ http://tdc-www.harvard.edu/mink/

Jessica Mink is an American software developer, positional astronomer, and data archivist at the Center for Astrophysics | Harvard & Smithsonian. She was part of the team that discovered the rings around the planet Uranus.

== Early life and career ==
Mink was born in Lincoln, Nebraska, in 1951 and graduated from Dundee Community High School in 1969. She earned an SB degree (1973) and an SM degree (1974) in Planetary Science from the Massachusetts Institute of Technology (MIT).

Upon rejecting her PhD application, Carl Sagan recommended Mink pursue a job at the Laboratory for Planetary Studies at Cornell University, which she did. She worked there from 1976 to 1979 as an astronomical software developer, under the direction of Jim Elliot. It was during this time that she was part of the team that discovered the rings around Uranus. Within the team, she was responsible for the data reduction software and data analysis.

After working at Cornell she moved back to MIT with her research group, where she did work that contributed to the discovery of the rings of Neptune. She then moved to the Harvard-Smithsonian Center for Astrophysics for the largest part of her career. She has written a number of commonly used software packages for astrophysics, including WCSTools and RVSAO.

Mink is a member of the American Astronomical Society and the International Astronomical Union.

== Personal life ==
Mink is an avid bicycle user and bicycle activist. She has served as an officer and director of the Massachusetts Bicycle Coalition and has been the route planner for the Massachusetts portion of the East Coast Greenway since 1991.

Mink is a transgender woman; she publicly came out in 2011 at the age of 60. She has since spoken out about her experiences transitioning. She was also featured in two articles about the experiences of transitioning in a professional environment. She was a co-organizer of the 2015 "Inclusive Astronomy" conference at Vanderbilt University.

Mink currently lives in Boston, Massachusetts (US), and has an adult daughter.
