= James L. Elliot =

American astronomer

Minor planets discovered: 7
see § List of discovered minor planets

James Ludlow Elliot (June 17, 1943 – March 3, 2011) was an American astronomer and scientist who, as part of a team, discovered the rings around the planet Uranus. Elliot was also part of a team that observed global warming on Triton, the largest moon of Neptune.

== Career ==
Elliot was born in 1943 in Columbus, Ohio and received his S.B. degree from the Massachusetts Institute of Technology (MIT) in 1965 and his Ph.D. degree from Harvard University in 1972. He held a postdoctoral position in Laboratory for Planetary Studies at Cornell University, and joined the faculty of Cornell's Astronomy Department in 1977. After he discovered Uranus's rings alongside Edward Dunham and Jessica Mink at Cornell, he returned to MIT in 1978 to serve as Professor of Physics, Professor of Earth, Atmospheric, and Planetary Sciences, and Director of the George R. Wallace, Jr. Astrophysical Observatory until his death on March 3, 2011.

There is some debate on whether Elliot, et al. discovered the rings of Uranus, or whether William Herschel made an observation in 1797. However, scientific consensus seems to support Elliot as the discoverer.

== Honors ==
- Main-belt asteroid 3193 Elliot, discovered by astronomer Edward Bowell at Anderson Mesa Station in 1983, was named in his honor. The official naming citation was published by the Minor Planet Center on 22 June 1986 (M.P.C. 10848).
- The crater Elliot on Pluto is also named in his honor.

== List of discovered minor planets ==
Elliot is credited by the Minor Planet Center with the discovery of seven minor planets, including the trans-Neptunian object (95625) 2002 GX32, which he co-discovered at CTIO in 2002.

(95625) 2002 GX32	8 April 2002	list^{[A]}^{[B]}
(541312) 2011 FU_{46}	22 May 2001	list^{[C]}
(542458) 2013 CQ_{189}	22 May 2001	list^{[C]}
(542569) 2013 EG_{112}	23 May 2001	list^{[C]}
(543629) 2014 OV_{131}	23 May 2001	list^{[C]}
(544322) 2014 UX_{86}	24 May 2001	list^{[C]}
(545532) 2011 PL_{9}	23 May 2001	list^{[C]}
Co-discovery made with:^{A} M. W. Buie^{B} A. B. Jordan^{C} L. H. Wasserman

== See also ==
- List of minor planet discoverers § J. L. Elliot
