= Ophelia (moon) =

Moon of Uranus

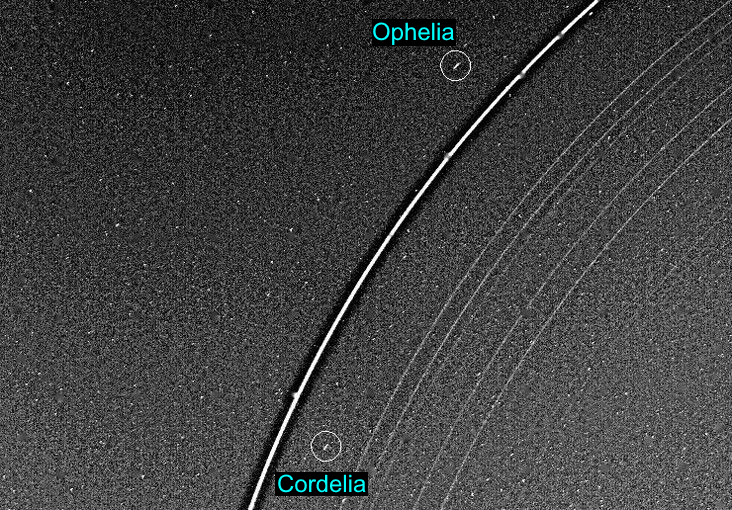
- Ophelia (top), Cordelia (bottom), and Uranus's narrow rings photographed from afar by Voyager 2 on 21 January 1986. The moons appear smeared due to their orbital motion during the image exposure.

Discovery
- Discovered by: Richard J. Terrile / Voyager 2
- Discovery date: January 20, 1986

Designations
- Designation: Uranus VII
- Pronunciation: /oʊˈfiːliə/ oh-FEE-lee-ə
- Adjectives: Ophelian /oʊˈfiːliən/ oh-FEE-lee-ən

Orbital characteristics
- Epoch 2008-09-01 00:00:00 UTC
- Semi-major axis: 53763.797 km
- Eccentricity: 0.00948
- Orbital period (sidereal): 0.377 d (calculated)
- Average orbital speed: 10.38 km/s (calculated)
- Inclination: 0.09080° (to Uranus's equator)
- Satellite of: Uranus

Physical characteristics
- Dimensions: 54 × 38 × 38 km (Note: The satellite's shape was modelled as a prolate spheroid (a × b × b); thus, only constraints for two axes were determined (a × b = 27 × 19 km).)
- Mean radius: 21.7±4.1 km (Note: This is the geometric mean of the three axes ($\sqrt[3]{a\cdot b\cdot b}$), calculated from $\sqrt{ab}$ = 23±4 km and $b/a$ = 0.7±0.3. However, various sources use 23±4 km or 27 × 19 km as the radius value or cross section size instead.)
- Volume: 40800 km^{3} ± 50.4%
- Mass: (3.57±0.32)×10^{16} kg
- Mean density: 0.87+0.89 −0.30 g/cm^{3}
- Synodic rotation period: synchronous (presumed)
- Axial tilt: zero (assumed)
- Albedo: ~0.062 (geometric) (Note: Visually estimated from Fig. 12 in Karkoschka, Hubble 2001.)
- Apparent magnitude: 23.16–23.35 (± 0.25) (at opposition)
- Absolute magnitude (H): 10.45–10.64 (± 0.25)

Ophelia is a moon of Uranus. It was discovered from the images taken by Voyager 2 on January 20, 1986, and was given the temporary designation S/1986 U 8. It was not seen again until the Hubble Space Telescope recovered it in 2003. Ophelia was named after the daughter of Polonius, Ophelia, in William Shakespeare's play Hamlet. It is also designated Uranus VII.

Other than its orbit, size of 54 km × 38 km (34 mi × 24 mi), and geometric albedo of 0.062, little is known about it. In images taken by Voyager 2, Ophelia appears as an elongated object, with its major axis pointing towards Uranus. The ratio of axes of Ophelia's prolate spheroid is 0.7 ± 0.3.

Ophelia acts as the outer shepherd satellite for Uranus's ε ring. The orbit of Ophelia is within the synchronous orbit radius of Uranus, and is therefore slowly decaying due to tidal forces.

== See also ==
- Moons of Uranus
