= Cordelia (moon) =

Moon of Uranus

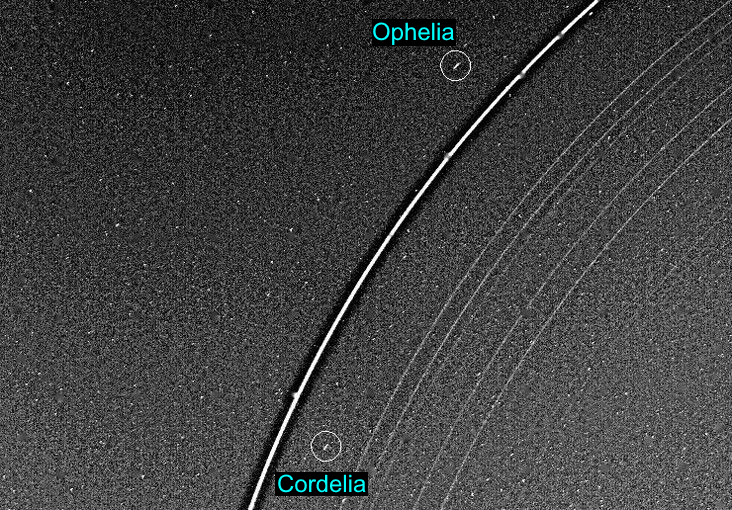
- Cordelia (bottom), Ophelia (top), and Uranus's narrow rings photographed from afar by Voyager 2 on 21 January 1986

Discovery
- Discovered by: Richard J. Terrile / Voyager 2
- Discovery date: January 20, 1986

Designations
- Designation: Uranus VI
- Pronunciation: /kɔːrˈdiːliə/
- Adjectives: Cordelian

Orbital characteristics
- Semi-major axis: 49751.722±0.149 km
- Eccentricity: 0.00026±0.000096
- Orbital period (sidereal): 0.33503384±0.00000058 d
- Inclination: 0.08479°±0.031° (to Uranus's equator)
- Satellite of: Uranus

Physical characteristics
- Dimensions: 50 × 36 × 36 km (Note: The satellite's shape was modelled as a prolate spheroid (a × b × b); thus, only constraints for two axes were determined (a × b = 25 × 18 km).)
- Mean radius: 19.8±3.0 km (Note: This is the geometric mean of the three axes ($\sqrt[3]{a\cdot b\cdot b}$), calculated from $\sqrt{ab}$ = 21±3 km and $b/a$ = 0.7±0.2. However, various sources use 21±3 km or 25 × 18 km as the radius value or cross section size instead.)
- Volume: 33900 km^{3} ± 34.9%
- Mass: (6.08±0.57)×10^{16} kg
- Mean density: 1.79+0.97 −0.49 g/cm^{3}
- Synodic rotation period: synchronous (assumed)
- Axial tilt: zero (assumed)
- Albedo: ~0.056 (geometric) (Note: Visually estimated from Fig. 12 in Karkoschka, Hubble 2001.)
- Apparent magnitude: 23.52–23.71 (± 0.35) (at opposition)
- Absolute magnitude (H): 10.81–11.00 (± 0.35)

Cordelia is the innermost known moon of Uranus. It was discovered from the images taken by Voyager 2 on January 20, 1986, and was given the temporary designation S/1986 U 7. It was not detected again until the Hubble Space Telescope observed it in 1997. Cordelia takes its name from the youngest daughter of Lear in William Shakespeare's King Lear. It is also designated Uranus VI.

Other than its orbit, size of 50 km × 36 km (31 mi × 22 mi), and geometric albedo of 0.056, little is known about it. In the Voyager 2 images, Cordelia appears as an elongated object with its major axis pointing towards Uranus. The ratio of axes of Cordelia's prolate spheroid is 0.7±0.2. Observations taken in 2001–2007 found that Cordelia had decreased in brightness by about a factor of five since the 1986 Voyager 2 flyby. The change in viewing geometry since then suggests that Cordelia may have a very flattened shape and be much smaller in size than inferred from previous measurements.

Cordelia acts as the inner shepherd satellite for Uranus's ε ring. Its orbit is within Uranus's synchronous orbit radius, and is therefore slowly decaying due to tidal deceleration. Cordelia is very close to a 5:3 orbital resonance with Rosalind.

== See also ==
- Moons of Uranus
- Inner moon
