= Dick Walker (astronomer) =

American astronomer (1936–2005)

- Walker, c. 1980s
- Born: Richard Lee Walker Jr. March 9, 1938; Hampton, Iowa, US
- Died: March 30, 2005 (aged 67); Flagstaff, Arizona, US
- Occupation: Astronomer
- Spouses: Ruth Bishop (m. 1960) Patricia Browning (m. 1987)
- Children: 3

Academic background
- Education: University of Northern Iowa; University of Iowa (BA); Georgetown University

Richard Lee Walker Jr. (March 9, 1938 – March 30, 2005) was an American astronomer known for his observations of double stars and for discovering Epimetheus, an inner moon of Saturn. He graduated from the University of Iowa in 1963 after studying physics and astronomy under James Van Allen and Satoshi Matsushima. He began work at the United States Naval Observatory (USNO) in Washington, D.C., in 1963. Initially assigned to the USNO's Time Service, he switched to work observing double stars alongside Kaj Strand.

Walker continued his focus on double stars after transfer to the USNO Flagstaff Station in 1966, ultimately making 8,000 measurements over the course of his career. Shortly after his arrival in Flagstaff, he discovered a small inner moon of Saturn. Initially identified with Audouin Dollfus's newly-discovered Janus, it was confirmed as a separate moon twelve years later and named Epimetheus. He retired from the Naval Observatory in 1999, but continued to work as an astronomical consultant. The main-belt asteroid 10717 Dickwalker was named in his honor.

== Early life ==
Richard Lee Walker Jr. was born in Hampton, Iowa, on March 9, 1938, to Mary and Richard Lee Walker. He was one of four siblings. He spent most of his childhood in Waterloo, Iowa, and there attended West High School. He was fascinated by astronomy from an early age, building a homemade telescope and reading many astronomy texts. In 1956, during his last year of high school, he set up a planetarium at the town's Grout Museum. He began college at the University of Northern Iowa in 1957, before transferring to the State University of Iowa in 1959. He studied astronomy under James Van Allen and Satoshi Matsushima. He joined the American Astronomical Society in 1960, on the urging of Matsushima, and graduated with a BA in astronomy and physics in 1963.

== Career ==
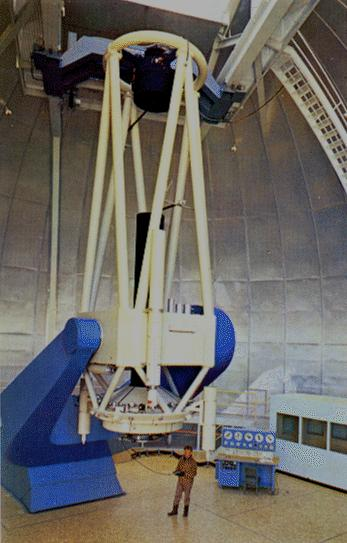
The 61-inch reflector at USNO Flagstaff

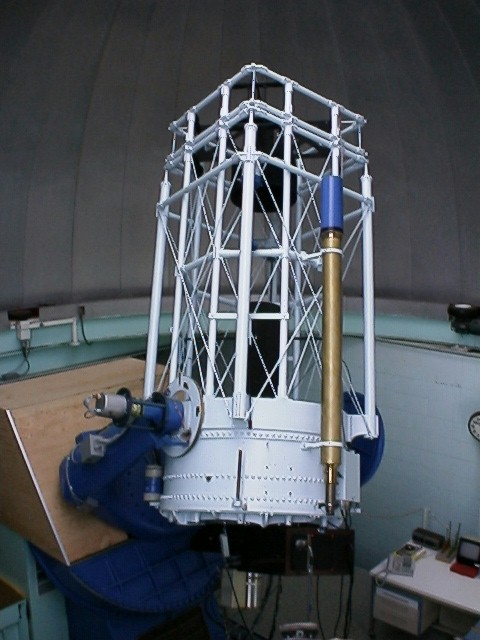
The 40-inch reflector at USNO Flagstaff

He began work for the Time Service of the United States Naval Observatory (USNO) later in 1963, working under William Markowitz in Washington, D.C. While there, he wrote a Fortran program to model lunar libration. Unhappy with the work at the Time Service, he took a position at the USNO's Astrometry and Astrophysics Division the following year. He was assigned to the photographic double star program under Stewart Sharpless and Kaj Strand. While working for the observatory, he pursued some graduate training at the Georgetown University Astronomical Observatory, studying under Robert E. Wilson. However, he declined to finish a master's degree in order to focus on his career work.

He transferred to the USNO Flagstaff Station in 1966, where he continued his observations of double and binary stars with the station's 40-inch and 61-inch reflectors. He frequently traveled to the Lick Observatory, near San Jose, California, in order to use its 36-inch Clark refractor. During his period of work on double stars, he made over 8,000 measurements. This resulted in the discovery of 22 binary stars, usually from known systems. In 1970, he made the second known observation of GCB 63, a supposed double star first observed by Michel Giacobini. The star has not been observed since, and no star is known to exist at its location; both researchers likely independently confused it with the nearby J 1224BC.

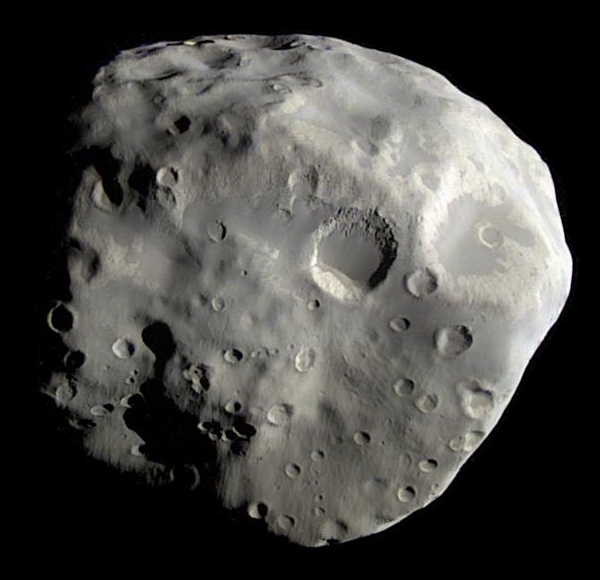
Epimetheus as imaged by the Cassini orbiter in 2007

Through 1966, Walker also became involved in telescopic searches for additional Saturnian satellites as Earth passed through the plane of Saturn's rings. On December 18, 1966, he made a series of 24 photographs of Saturn at Flagstaff. Learning of Audouin Dollfus's discovery of Janus several days earlier, Walker looked over the images and found evidence of an object appearing to match Dollfus's observations. However, in October 1978, astronomers Stephen M. Laerson and John W. Fountain identified them as two separate objects; Walker's observations were instead realized to be the discovery of the moon Epimetheus. The two moons were initially thought to be identical due to their unusual co-orbital configuration, sharing nearly the same orbit; one orbits slightly higher than the other, trading positions roughly every four years. This was confirmed three years later by Voyager 1's flyby of Saturn. Voyager's observations also led to the discovery of Prometheus, a small moon with a similar brightness and orbital period to Epimetheus. Three of Walker's observations were found to have matched the positions of both Epimetheus and Prometheus upon reinvestigation.

Due to lifelong interests in Egyptology and archaeoastronomy, he studied hieroglyphs and traveled to Egypt in 1977, hiking along the Nile from Aswan to Cairo. He was stopped by Egyptian authorities in Asyut under suspicions of espionage for the Israeli government. Inspired by a visit to the Pyramids of Giza, he began research into William Herschel's theory that the entrance passageway of the Pyramid of Khufu was aligned with the position of the North Star, Polaris. He calculated that Thuban, then the star closest to the northern celestial pole, would not have been visible from the entranceway during Khufu's reign. He experimented with sliding large limestone and granite blocks over an adjustable ramp, and theorised the 26.5° angle of the passage was adopted for structural reasons instead; Walker described the angle as optimal for sliding the rock downhill. He retired from the Naval Observatory in May 1999, although he continued some work as a consultant for astronomical construction projects.

== Personal life and death ==
He married Ruth Bishop in 1960, and with her had three children. After a divorce, he married Patricia Browning in 1987. On March 30, 2005, Walker died in Flagstaff after a long illness. The main-belt asteroid 10717 Dickwalker was named for him.
