= Epimetheus (disambiguation) =

Epimetheus was a Titan in Greek mythology.

Epimetheus may also refer to:

- Epimetheus (moon), a moon of Saturn
- 1810 Epimetheus, an asteroid

== See also ==
- Epimitheus, a ballet by Russell Ducker premiered by the Barcelona Ballet
