= 1809 Prometheus =

Main-belt asteroid

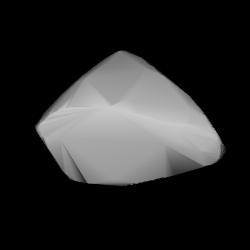
- Shape model of Prometheus from its lightcurve

Discovery
- Discovered by: C. J. van Houten; I. van Houten-G. T. Gehrels (Palomar–Leiden survey)
- Discovery site: Palomar Obs.
- Discovery date: 24 September 1960

Designations
- Pronunciation: /prəˈmiːθiːəs/
- Named after: Προμηθεύς Promētheys (Greek mythology)
- Alternative designations: 2522 P-L · 1943 EA_{1} 1955 SW · 1955 VA; 1965 UR
- Minor planet category: main-belt · (outer)
- Adjectives: Promethean, -ian /prəˈmiːθiːən/

Orbital characteristics
- Epoch 4 September 2017 (JD 2458000.5)
- Uncertainty parameter 0
- Observation arc: 61.53 yr (22,473 days)
- Aphelion: 3.2256 au
- Perihelion: 2.6245 au
- Semi-major axis: 2.9251 au
- Eccentricity: 0.1027
- Orbital period (sidereal): 5.00 yr (1,827 days)
- Mean anomaly: 163.57°
- Mean motion: 0° 11^{m} 49.2^{s} / day
- Inclination: 3.2585°
- Longitude of ascending node: 99.484°
- Argument of perihelion: 231.33°

Physical characteristics
- Dimensions: 14.212±0.097 km
- Geometric albedo: 0.126±0.010
- Absolute magnitude (H): 11.7

1809 Prometheus /prəˈmiːθiːəs/ is an asteroid from the outer region of the asteroid belt, approximately 14 kilometers in diameter. Discovered during the Palomar–Leiden survey in 1960, it was given the provisional designation 2522 P-L and named after Prometheus from Greek mythology.

== Orbit and classification ==
Prometheus orbits the Sun in the outer main-belt at a distance of 2.6–3.2 au once every 5.00 years (1,827 days). Its orbit has an eccentricity of 0.10 and an inclination of 3° with respect to the ecliptic.

== Discovery ==
It was discovered on 24 September 1960, by the Dutch astronomer couple Ingrid and Cornelis Johannes van Houten at Leiden, on photographic plates taken by Dutch–American astronomer Tom Gehrels at Palomar, California, in the United States. On the same night, the team of astronomers discovered several other minor planets including 1810 Epimetheus.

Prometheus was first identified as 1943 EA_{1} at the Hungarian Konkoly Observatory in 1943. In 1955, its first used observation was taken at Goethe Link Observatory, when it was identified as 1955 SW, extending the body's observation arc by 5 years prior to its official discovery observation.

The survey designation "P-L" stands for Palomar–Leiden, named after Palomar Observatory and Leiden Observatory, which collaborated on the fruitful Palomar–Leiden survey in the 1960s. Gehrels used Palomar's Samuel Oschin telescope (also known as the 48-inch Schmidt Telescope), and shipped the photographic plates to Ingrid and Cornelis van Houten at Leiden, where astrometry was carried out. The trio are credited with the discovery of several thousand minor planets.

== Naming ==
This minor planet was named for Prometheus, a Titan from Greek mythology, who stole the fire from the gods. The name has also been given to a moon of Saturn, Prometheus (moon), discovered by the Voyager 1 spacecraft in 1980. The asteroid 1810 Epimetheus is named after his brother. The official naming citation was published by the Minor Planet Center on 20 February 1976 (M.P.C. 3934).

== Physical characteristics ==
According to the surveys carried out by NASA's Wide-field Infrared Survey Explorer with its subsequent NEOWISE mission, Prometheus measures 14.2 kilometers in diameter, and its surface has an albedo of 0.126. As of 2017, its spectral type, rotation period and shape remain unknown.
