= Audouin Dollfus =

French astronomer and aeronaut

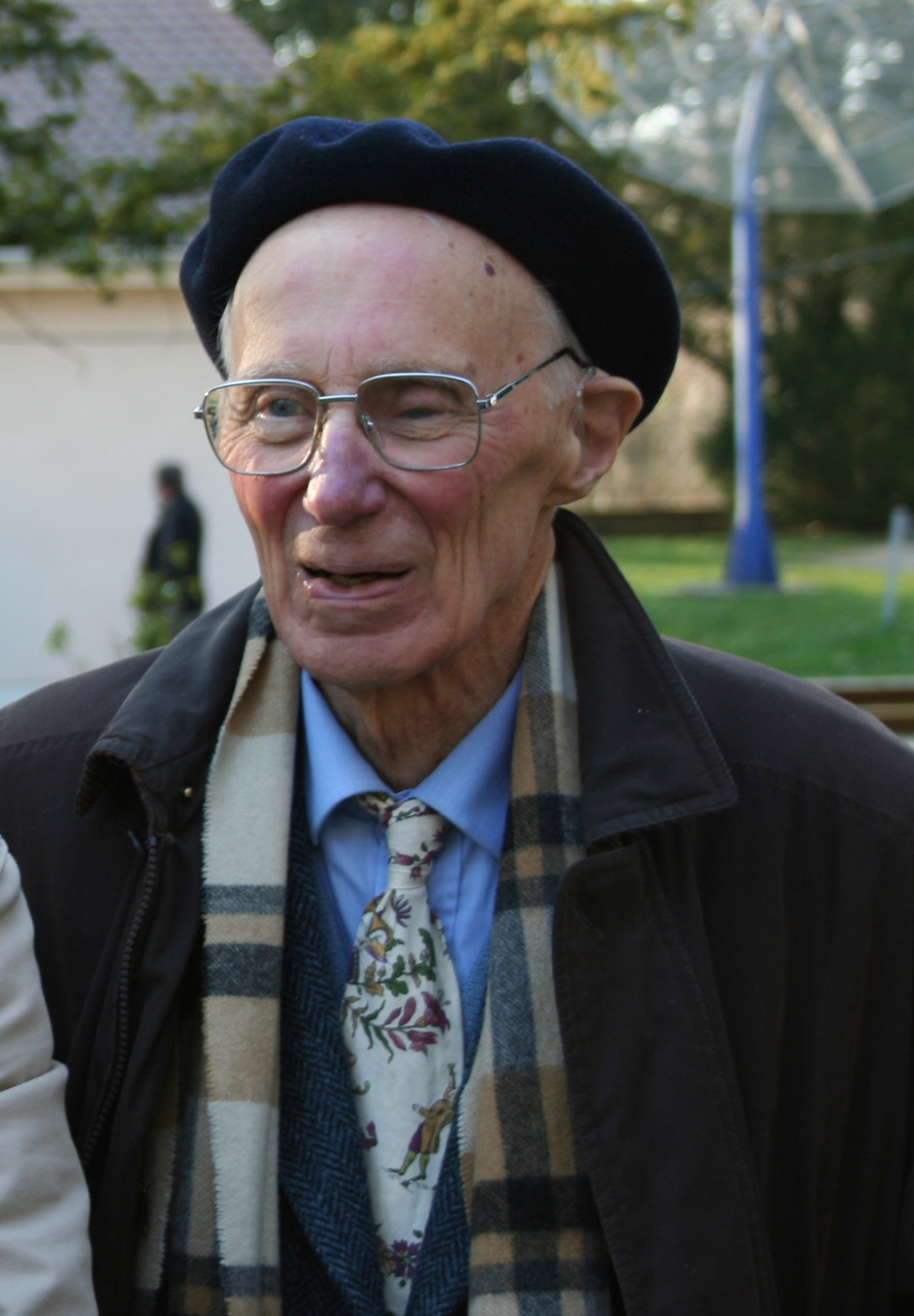
- Dollfus in 2009
- Born: 12 November 1924; Paris, France
- Died: 1 October 2010 (aged 85); Versailles, France
- Education: University of Paris
- Known for: Discoverer of Janus
- Awards: Prix Jules Janssen (1993)
- Scientific career
- Fields: astronomy
- Workplaces: Paris Observatory
- Doctoral advisor: Bernard Lyot

Audouin Charles Dollfus (12 November 1924 – 1 October 2010) was a French astronomer and aeronaut, specialist in studies of the Solar System and discoverer of Janus, a moon of Saturn.

== Life and career ==
Dollfus was born in Paris to aeronaut Charles Dollfus.

Dollfus studied at the University of Paris, obtaining a doctorate in physical sciences in 1955. Beginning in 1946, Dollfus worked as an astronomer at the Meudon Observatory, following his advisor and mentor Bernard Lyot. In particular, he directed the Laboratory of Solar System Physics there. Until his death, he was an honorary astronomer at the Paris Observatory. Most of his work was carried out based on observations from the Pic du Midi Observatory, and his preferred research method is the use of polarized light as a diagnostic of the properties of Solar System objects. Through patient and persistent research and the development of new observational techniques, he was able to obtain many remarkable results. Dollfus published more than 300 scientific publications, relating primarily to astrophysics of the Solar System.

Before the Viking spacecraft landed on Mars, the composition of the Martian surface was the subject of many debates. Dollfus tried to determine the composition of the Martian desert, through comparison with the appearance in polarized light of several hundred terrestrial minerals. He found that only pulverized limonite (FeO(OH)) corresponded with the appearance of Mars, and concluded that the Martian surface could be composed of iron oxide. Astronomer Gerard P. Kuiper of the University of Chicago disagreed with this conclusion, believing that fine-grained igneous rocks were a better fit to the data, but subsequent observations proved Dollfus correct.

By using the polarization of light, it is possible to detect an atmosphere around a planet or natural satellite. In 1950, most scientists thought that Mercury, because of its small size, had probably lost its atmosphere due to molecular escape into space. Dollfus announced that he had detected a very small atmosphere, again using polarization measurements made at the Pic du Midi Observatory in the French Pyrenees. His discovery contradicted the previous theoretical predictions based on the kinetic theory of gases. Dollfus estimated that the atmospheric pressure at the surface of Mercury was approximately 1 mm of mercury. The nature of gas composing this atmosphere was unknown but thought to be a dense, heavy gas. It was however certain that the atmosphere of Mercury must be less than 1/300th that of the Earth. Currently, it is known that the atmosphere of Mercury is very thin indeed: only 10^{−15} bar, with the total mass of the atmosphere not exceeding 1000 kg.

Mercury has dark zones which contrast with a brighter bottom; this was observed first by Giovanni Schiaparelli in 1889. By using the refracting telescope of the Pic du Midi Observatory, Dollfus was able in 1959 to clearly resolve surface features as small as 300 km.

Dollfus also studied the possible presence of an atmosphere around the Moon. The rate of dissipation into space of any gases on the Moon (except for certain rare heavy elements) is so high that no substantial atmosphere is possible. The presence of any atmosphere should be detectable by the polarization of light; Bernard Lyot and later Dollfus showed that there was no detectable polarization, thereby confirming the theoretical prediction that the Moon lacks an atmosphere.

Direct visual observation became rare in astronomy. By 1965 Robert S. Richardson called Dollfus one of two great living experienced visual observers as talented as Percival Lowell or Giovanni Schiaparelli. In 1966, Dollfus discovered Janus, a small inner moon of Saturn. He made this discovery by observing at a time when the rings, very close to Janus, were nearly edge-on to the Earth and thus practically invisible. At this time he probably also observed Epimetheus, a smaller moon which shares the same orbit as Janus, but he did not realize these were two separate objects and it is Richard Walker that holds credit for this discovery.

In 1981, Dollfus became a founding member of the World Cultural Council.

== Aerospace and Ballooning Pioneer ==
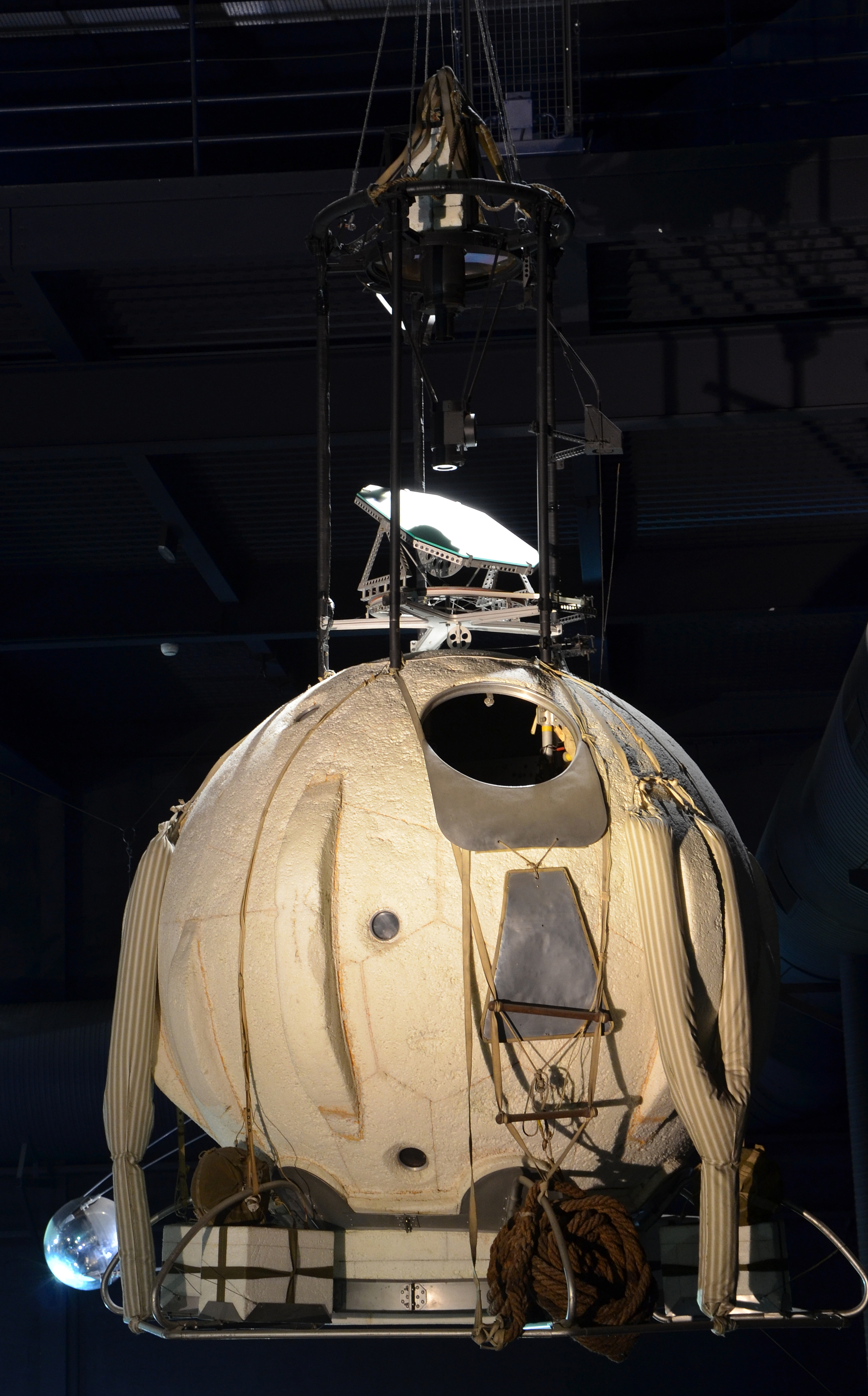
Basket of the balloon used in 1959 by Audouin Dollfuss to make astronomical observations at 14000 meters of altitude.

With his father, the aeronautical pioneer Charles Dollfus, he holds several world records in ballooning, including the first stratospheric flight in France. He was the first to carry out astronomical observations from a stratospheric balloon, in particular to study Mars in a detailed way.

== Honours and awards ==
The asteroid 2451 Dollfus is named in his honour. One of the largest craters on Mars was also named for him in 2013.

Dollfus was the President of the Société astronomique de France (SAF), the French popular astronomy society, from 1979 to 1981. The Société astronomique de France awarded him its Prix Jules Janssen in 1993.
