= Mario Acuña =

Argentine astrophysicist (1940–2009)

Mario Humberto Acuña
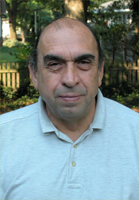
- Acuña in 2007
- Born: March 21, 1940; Córdoba, Argentina
- Died: March 5, 2009 (aged 68); Bowie, Maryland
- Citizenship: Argentina (birth), United States (April 1994)
- Education: National University of Córdoba (B.A.); National University of Tucumán (MSEE); Catholic University of America (Ph.D)
- Known for: Mars Global Surveyor Mission
- Awards: Moe Schneebaum Memorial Award; NASA Exceptional Scientific Achievement Medal; NASA Distinguished Service Medal; Presidential Rank Meritorious Award
- Scientific career
- Fields: Planetary magnetism
- Workplaces: NASA Goddard Space Flight Center

Mario Humberto Acuña (March 21, 1940 – March 5, 2009) was an Argentine research scientist at NASA Goddard Space Flight Center in the Space Plasmas and Planetary Magnetospheres Branches, and then as a Senior Astrophysicist. He was a major pioneer in the field of planetary magnetism.

== Biography ==
As a result of political unrest in Argentina, particularly in and around Universities, Dr. Acuña left Argentina and became a permanent resident of the United States of America. He became a naturalized U.S. citizen in April 1994. He earned a B.A. degree in humanities and economics from the Universidad Nacional de Córdoba, an MSEE degree from the Universidad Nacional de Tucumán in 1967, and a Ph.D. in Space Physics from the Catholic University of America in 1974.

== Career ==
=== Positions held ===
Acuña was a principal investigator on magnetometer experiments flown on numerous missions over the years, from the Pioneer 11 Fluxgate Magnetometer Experiment in 1973 to the Mars Global Surveyor Magnetic Field Experiment in 1994, and the MESSENGER magnetometer.

He was one of the leaders NASA delegation who visited Argentina in July 1987 to start the collaboration between NASA and CNIE (the predecessor of CONAE).

=== Contributions ===
Dr. Acuña is best known for his work in Planetary magnetism and his contributions leading to the discovery of Jupiter's ring, as well as the magnetic field of Mars and Neptune. His research laboratory was involved in the Defense Meteorological Satellite Program in which they collected weather data for the military, as well as leading the world in development of scientific instruments that measure physical phenomena.

=== Awards ===
Dr. Acuña has received many awards including the Moe Schneebaum Memorial Award in 1979, the NASA Exceptional Scientific Achievement Medal in 1986, the NASA Distinguished Service Medal in 1996, the John C. Lindsay Memorial Award in 1999, and the Presidential Rank Meritorious Award in 2003.

== Death and legacy ==
Dr. Acuña died March 5, 2009, aged 68, of Multiple Myeloma at his home in Bowie, Maryland. Dr. Acuña's blog is occasionally updated by his family members, and documents some of the personal experiences of dealing with his illness.
