= 1810 Epimetheus =

Stony main-belt asteroid

Discovery
- Discovered by: C. J. van Houten; I. van Houten-G. T. Gehrels (Palomar–Leiden survey)
- Discovery site: Palomar Obs.
- Discovery date: 24 September 1960

Designations
- Pronunciation: /ɛpɪˈmiːθiːəs/
- Named after: Epimetheus (Greek mythology)
- Alternative designations: 4196 P-L · 1942 FS; 1950 SC · 1957 WC_{1} 1962 GC · 1970 SS
- Minor planet category: main-belt · Flora

Orbital characteristics
- Epoch 4 September 2017 (JD 2458000.5)
- Uncertainty parameter 0
- Observation arc: 66.21 yr (24,182 days)
- Aphelion: 2.4284 AU
- Perihelion: 2.0198 AU
- Semi-major axis: 2.2241 AU
- Eccentricity: 0.0919
- Orbital period (sidereal): 3.32 yr (1,211 days)
- Mean anomaly: 338.76°
- Mean motion: 0° 17^{m} 49.92^{s} / day
- Inclination: 4.0315°
- Longitude of ascending node: 254.12°
- Argument of perihelion: 203.70°

Physical characteristics
- Dimensions: 7.669±0.162 km 8.19 km (calculated)
- Synodic rotation period: 10.88±0.02 h 28.61±0.01 h (Note: Pravec 2007, web publication, summary figures given in the Light Curve Data Base – (1810) Epimetheus)
- Geometric albedo: 0.24 (assumed); 0.274±0.037
- Spectral type: S
- Absolute magnitude (H): 12.53±0.33 · 12.6

1810 Epimetheus /ɛpɪˈmiːθiːəs/, provisional designation 4196 P-L, is a stony Florian asteroid from the inner regions of the asteroid belt, approximately 8 kilometers in diameter.

It was discovered on 24 September 1960, by Dutch astronomer couple Ingrid and Cornelis van Houten, and Dutch–American astronomer Tom Gehrels during the Palomar–Leiden survey at Palomar Observatory in California, United States. It was later named after Epimetheus from Greek mythology.

== Classification and orbit ==
The S-type asteroid is a member of the Flora family, one of the largest groups of stony asteroids in the main-belt. It orbits the Sun at a distance of 2.0–2.4 AU once every 3 years and 4 months (1,211 days). Its orbit has an eccentricity of 0.09 and an inclination of 4° with respect to the ecliptic.

The body's observation arc begins with its official discovery observation, as the previous identifications, 1942 FS and 1950 SC, made at Johannesburg and Uccle in 1942 and 1950, respectively, remained unused.

== Physical characteristics ==
=== Rotation period ===
Two divergent rotational lightcurves of Epimetheus were obtained from photometric observations. They gave a rotation period of 10.9 and 28.6 hours with both having a brightness variation of 0.04 magnitude (U=2/2).

=== Diameter and albedo ===
According to the survey carried out by NASA's Wide-field Infrared Survey Explorer with its subsequent NEOWISE mission, Epimetheus measures 7.7 kilometers in diameter and its surface has an albedo of 0.27, while the Collaborative Asteroid Lightcurve Link assumes an albedo of 0.24 – derived from 8 Flora, the largest member and namesake of its orbital family – and calculates a diameter of 8.2 kilometers, based on an absolute magnitude of 12.6.

== Survey designation ==
The survey designation "P-L" stands for Palomar–Leiden, named after Palomar Observatory and Leiden Observatory, which collaborated on the fruitful Palomar–Leiden survey in the 1960s. Gehrels used Palomar's Samuel Oschin telescope (also known as the 48-inch Schmidt Telescope), and shipped the photographic plates to Ingrid and Cornelis van Houten at Leiden Observatory where astrometry was carried out. The trio are credited with the discovery of several thousand minor planets.

== Naming ==
This minor planet is named for the Titan in Greek mythology, Epimetheus, who opened Pandora's box, which contained all the illnesses and ailments of mankind (also see 55 Pandora). Epimetheus is also a moon of Saturn, which was discovered by Voyager 1 in 1980. Epimetheus is the brother of Prometheus after whom the minor planet 1809 Prometheus was named. The official naming citation was published by the Minor Planet Center on 20 February 1976 (M.P.C. 3935).
