= Pioneer 11 =

First spacecraft to visit Saturn (1973–1995)

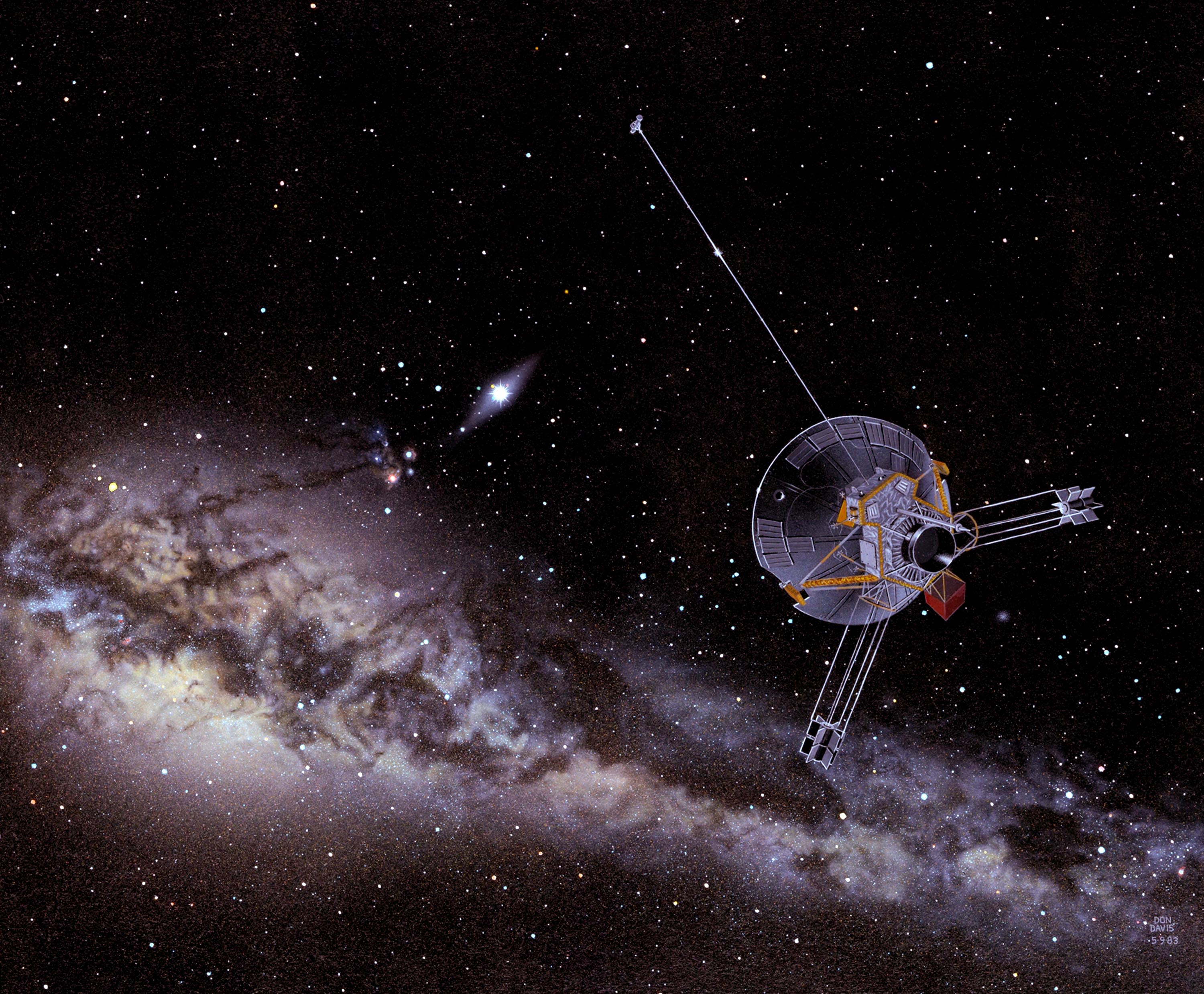
- An artist's impression of a Pioneer spacecraft on its way to interstellar space.
- Mission type: Planetary / Heliosphere exploration
- Operator: NASA / Ames
- COSPAR ID: 1973-019A
- SATCAT no.: 6421
- Website: science.nasa.gov
- Mission duration: 22 years, 7 months and 19 days

Spacecraft properties
- Spacecraft: Pioneer G
- Manufacturer: TRW
- Launch mass: 258.5 kg (570 lb)
- Power: 155 watts (at launch)

Start of mission
- Launch date: April 6, 1973, 02:11:00 UTC
- Rocket: Atlas SLV-3D Centaur-D1A Star-37E
- Launch site: Cape Canaveral LC-36B

End of mission
- Disposal: Decommissioned
- Last contact: November 24, 1995

Flyby of Jupiter
- Closest approach: December 3, 1974
- Distance: 43,000 km (27,000 mi)

Flyby of Saturn
- Closest approach: September 1, 1979
- Distance: 21,000 km (13,000 mi)
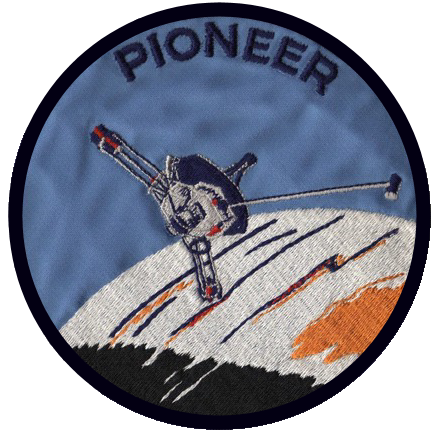
- Pioneer program

Pioneer 11 (originally designated Pioneer G) is a NASA space probe launched in 1973 that completed the first mission to the planet Saturn. It was the first spacecraft to encounter Saturn, the second to fly through the asteroid belt, and the second to fly past Jupiter. It later became the fourth human-made object to pass beyond the orbits of the planets and the second of five artificial objects to reach the escape velocity needed to leave the Solar System. NASA Ames Research Center in California managed the mission, and TRW Inc. built the spacecraft.

The spacecraft was built around a hexagonal satellite bus and used four radioisotope thermoelectric generators (RTGs) to supply electrical power, producing a combined 155 watts at launch.

Pioneer 11 launched on April 6, 1973, at 02:11:00 UTC aboard an Atlas-Centaur rocket from Cape Canaveral Launch Complex 36B. After traversing the asteroid belt, it made its closest approach to Jupiter on December 3, 1974, passing within 42,500 km (26,400 mi) of the planet. The spacecraft returned detailed images of Jupiter, including the first close-up views of its polar regions, and about 200 images of its moons. It then used Jupiter's gravity to redirect its trajectory toward Saturn, where it made its closest approach on September 1, 1979, at a distance of 21,000 km (13,000 mi). During the mission, its scientific instruments studied the asteroid belt, the environments of Jupiter and Saturn, the solar wind, cosmic rays, and the outer heliosphere.

The last signal from Pioneer 11 was received on November 24, 1995, after declining electrical power from its RTGs left the spacecraft unable to continue operating.

== Mission background ==
=== History ===
Approved in February 1969, Pioneer 11 and its twin spacecraft, Pioneer 10, were the first probes designed to explore the outer Solar System. Early mission objectives, developed from proposals made throughout the 1960s, were to:

- Explore the interplanetary medium beyond the orbit of Mars.
- Investigate the asteroid belt and assess its potential hazard to missions to the outer planets.
- Explore Jupiter and its environment.

After a Saturn encounter was added to the mission plan, additional objectives included:

- Map Saturn's magnetic field and determine its strength, direction, and structure.
- Measure the distribution of electrons and protons of different energies along the spacecraft's trajectory through the Saturnian system.
- Study the interaction between Saturn's magnetosphere and the solar wind.
- Measure the temperatures of Saturn's atmosphere and of Titan, Saturn's largest moon.
- Investigate the structure of Saturn's upper atmosphere, including its ionosphere.
- Map the thermal structure of Saturn's atmosphere using infrared observations and radio occultation measurements.
- Obtain two-color spin-scan images of the Saturnian system and polarimetric measurements of Saturn.
- Study Saturn's rings and atmosphere using S-band radio occultation.
- Improve estimates of the masses of Saturn and its larger moons by measuring their gravitational effects on the spacecraft's trajectory.
- Characterize the environment of Saturn's ring plane in preparation for the planned Voyager program, helping determine whether it could be crossed safely without serious damage to a spacecraft.

Pioneer 11 was built by TRW Inc. and managed by NASA Ames Research Center as part of the Pioneer program. A backup spacecraft, Pioneer H, is on display at the National Air and Space Museum. Many aspects of the mission informed the planning and design of the Voyager program.

Pioneer 10 and Pioneer 11 spacecraft diagram

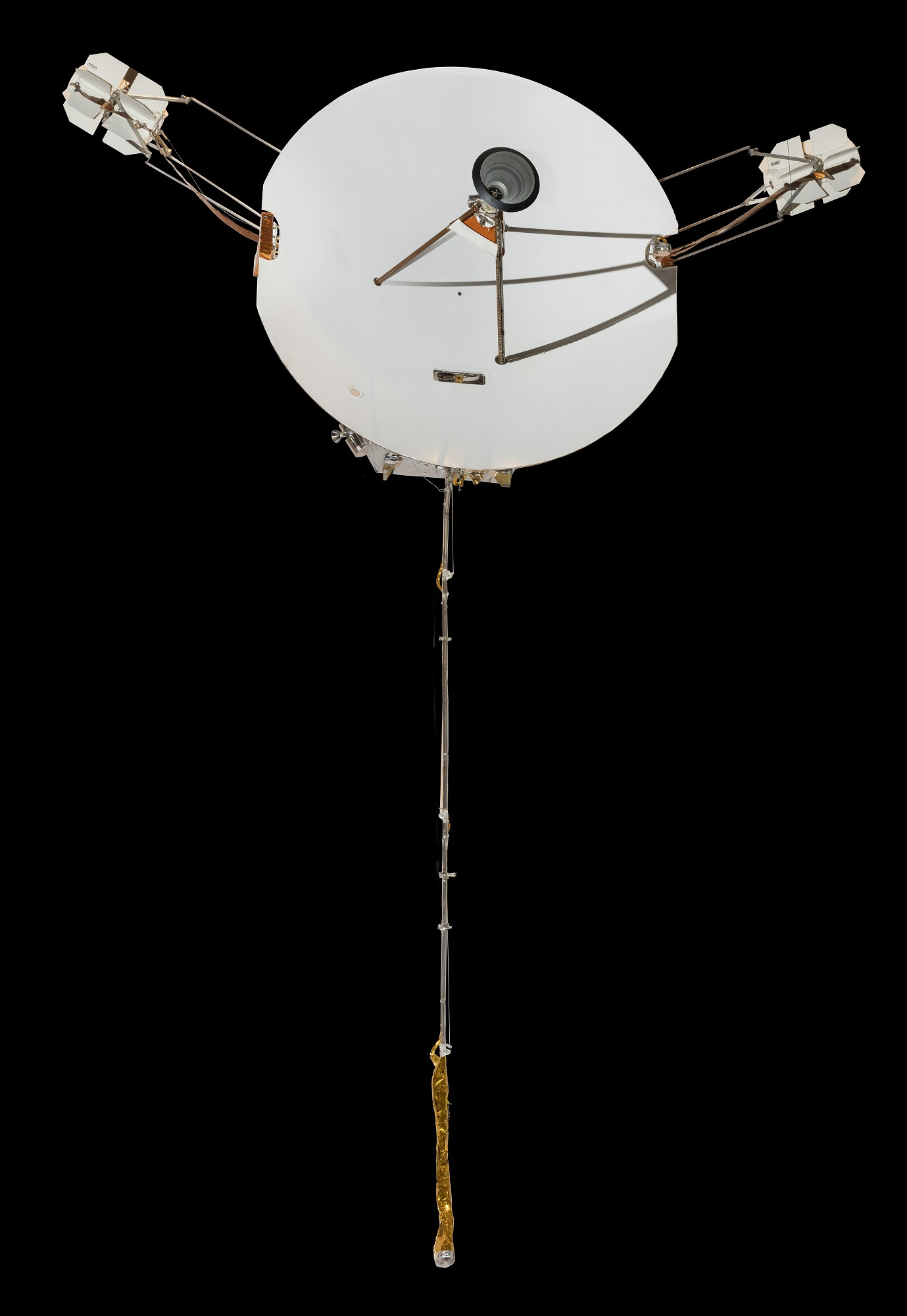
Reconstructed full-scale mock-up Pioneer 10 / 11 spacecraft at the National Air and Space Museum

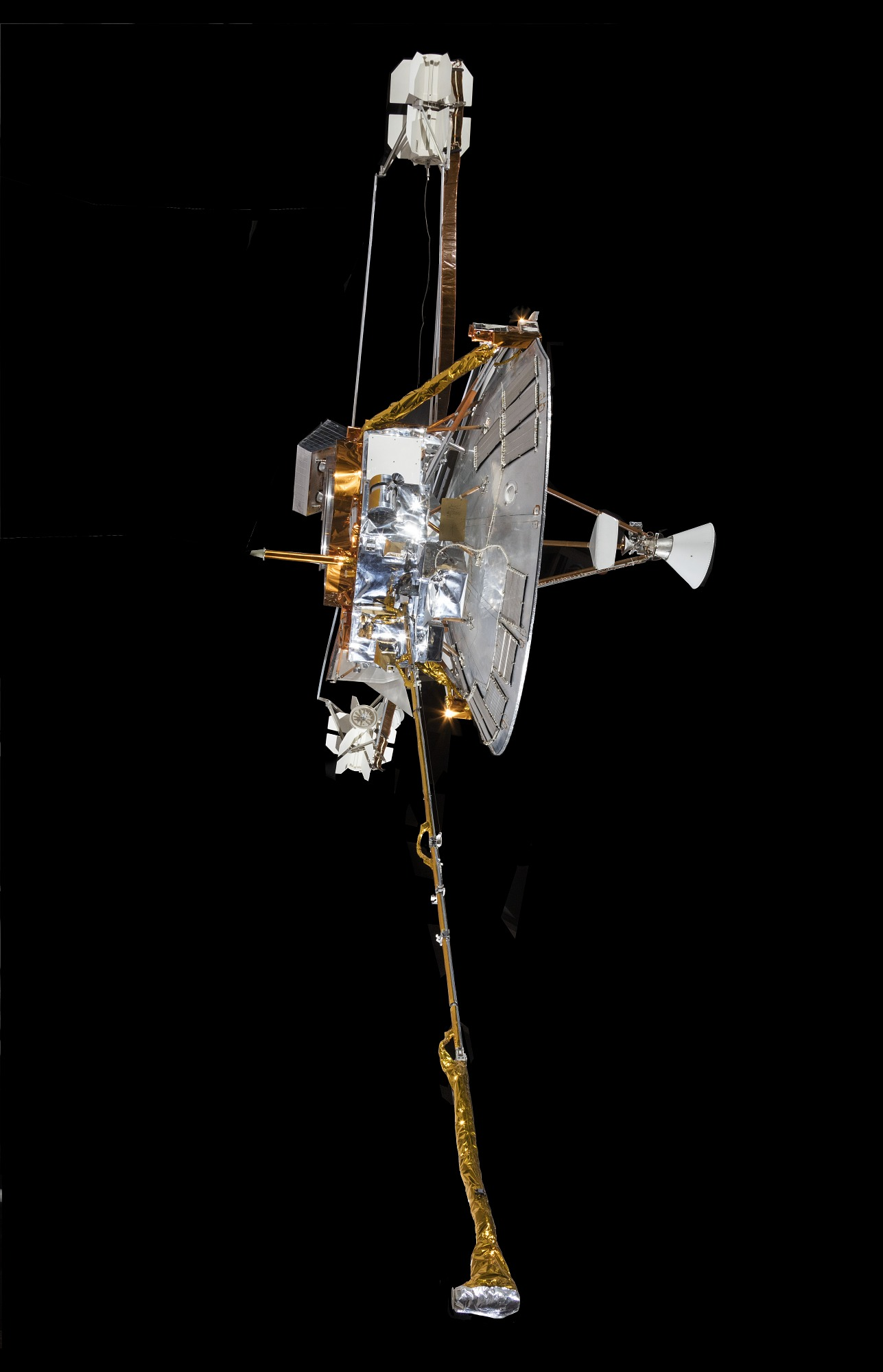
Side view of the spacecraft

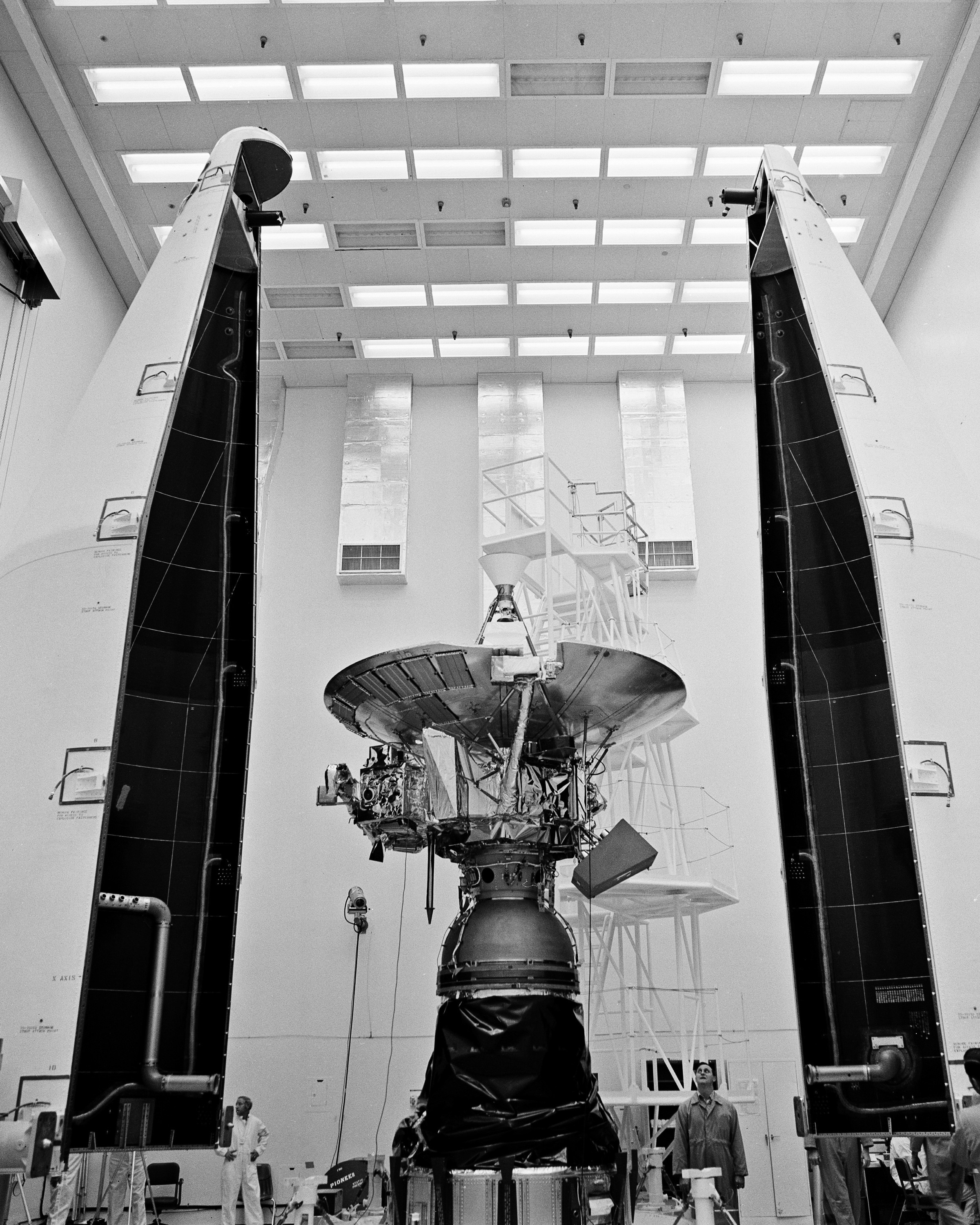
Pioneer 11 during the installation of its protective shroud

=== Spacecraft design ===
The Pioneer 11 bus is 36 cm (14 in) deep and consists of six 76 cm (30 in) panels forming a hexagonal structure. The bus houses the propellant used to control the spacecraft’s orientation and eight of its 12 scientific instruments. The spacecraft has a mass of 259 kg (571 lb).

The spacecraft's orientation was maintained by six 4.5 N hydrazine monopropellant thrusters. The thrusters were arranged in three pairs: one pair maintained a constant spin rate of 4.8 rpm, another controlled forward thrust, and the third controlled attitude. Orientation information was provided by conical scanning maneuvers used to track Earth as it orbited the Sun, a star tracker capable of tracking Canopus, and two Sun sensors.

==== Communication system ====
Pioneer 11 had a redundant communications system with two transceivers: one connected to the high-gain antenna and the other to the omnidirectional and medium-gain antennas. Each transceiver had a power output of 8 W and operated in the S band, receiving commands from Earth at 2110 MHz and transmitting data at 2292 MHz. The Deep Space Network tracked the spacecraft's signal. Before transmission, the probe used convolutional coding to allow errors in the received data to be detected and corrected on Earth.

==== Power ====
SNAP-19 RTG on a Pioneer 10/11 replica

Pioneer 11 used four SNAP-19 radioisotope thermoelectric generators (RTGs). The RTGs were mounted on two three-rod trusses, each 3 m (9 ft 10 in) long and positioned 120 degrees apart. This arrangement was intended to keep the RTGs a safe distance from the spacecraft's sensitive scientific instruments. Together, the RTGs provided 155 W of power at launch, decreasing to 140 W during the spacecraft's journey to Jupiter. The spacecraft required 100 W to operate all systems.

==== Computers ====
Much of the computation for Pioneer 11 was performed on Earth, with commands transmitted to the spacecraft. Pioneer 11 could store up to five commands at a time from a library of 222 commands prepared by ground controllers. Its command system consisted of two command decoders and a command distribution unit, which provided limited onboard processing for directing spacecraft operations. This system required mission operators to prepare commands well in advance of transmission.

A data storage unit could record up to 6,144 bytes of data collected by the scientific instruments. A digital telemetry unit then organized the data into one of 13 possible formats before transmitting them to Earth.

==== Scientific instruments ====
Pioneer 11 had one more instrument than Pioneer 10, a fluxgate magnetometer.

Helium Vector Magnetometer (HVM)
Measured the fine structure of the interplanetary magnetic field, mapped the magnetosphere of Jupiter, and provided magnetic field measurements to evaluate solar wind interaction with Jupiter.: Principal investigator: Edward Smith / JPL; Data: PDS/PPI data catalog, NSSDC data archive
Quadrispherical Plasma Analyzer
Peered through a hole in the large dish-shaped antenna to detect particles of the solar wind originating from the Sun.: Principal investigator: Aaron Barnes / NASA Ames Research Center (archived website); Data: PDS/PPI data catalog, NSSDC data archive
Charged Particle Instrument (CPI)
Detected cosmic rays in the Solar System.: Principal investigator: John Simpson / University of Chicago; Data: NSSDC data archive
Cosmic Ray Telescope (CRT)
Collected data on the composition of the cosmic ray particles and their energy ranges.: Principal investigator: Frank B. McDonald / NASA Goddard Space Flight Center; Data: PDS/PPI data catalog, NSSDC data archive
Geiger Tube Telescope (GTT)
Surveyed the intensities, energy spectra, and angular distributions of electrons and protons along the spacecraft's path through the radiation belts of Jupiter and Saturn.: Principal investigator: James A. Van Allen / University of Iowa (website); Data: PDS/PPI data catalog, NSSDC data archive, NSSDC Jupiter data archive
Trapped Radiation Detector (TRD)
Included an unfocused Cherenkov counter that detected the light emitted in a particular direction as particles passed through it, recording electrons with energies of 0.5–12 MeV. An electron scatter detector measured electrons with energies of 100–400 keV, while a minimum ionizing detector consisting of a solid-state diode measured minimum-ionizing particles with energies below 3 MeV and protons in the range of 50–350 MeV.: Principal investigator: R. Fillius / University of California San Diego; Data: NSSDC hourly data archive, NSSDC Saturn data archive
Meteoroid Detectors
Consisted of 12 pressurized cells mounted on the back of the main dish antenna that recorded impacts from small meteoroids.: Principal investigator: William Kinard / NASA Langley Research Center; Data: NSSDC data archive list
Asteroid/Meteoroid Detector (AMD)
Looked into space with four non-imaging telescopes to track particles ranging from close by bits of dust to distant large asteroids.: Principal investigator: Robert Soberman / General Electric Company; Data: NSSDC data archive list
Ultraviolet Photometer
Sensed ultraviolet light (200 to 800 Å) to determine the quantities of hydrogen and helium in space and on Jupiter and Saturn.: Principal investigator: Darrell Judge / University of Southern California; Data: PDS/PPI data catalog, NSSDC data archive
Imaging Photopolarimeter (IPP)
Relied upon the spin of the spacecraft to sweep a small telescope across the planet in narrow strips only 0.03 degrees wide, looking at the planet in red (5800 to 7000 Å) and blue (3900 to 4900 Å) light. These strips were then processed to build up a visual image of the planet.: Principal investigator: Tom Gehrels / University of Arizona; Data: NSSDC data archive list
Infrared Radiometer
Provided information on cloud temperature and the output of heat from Jupiter and Saturn.: Principal investigator: Andrew Ingersoll / California Institute of Technology
Triaxial Fluxgate Magnetometer
Measured the magnetic fields of both Jupiter and Saturn. This instrument was not carried on Pioneer 10.: Principal investigator: Mario Acuna / NASA Goddard Space Flight Center; Data: NSSDC data archive list

== Mission profile ==
=== Launch and trajectory ===
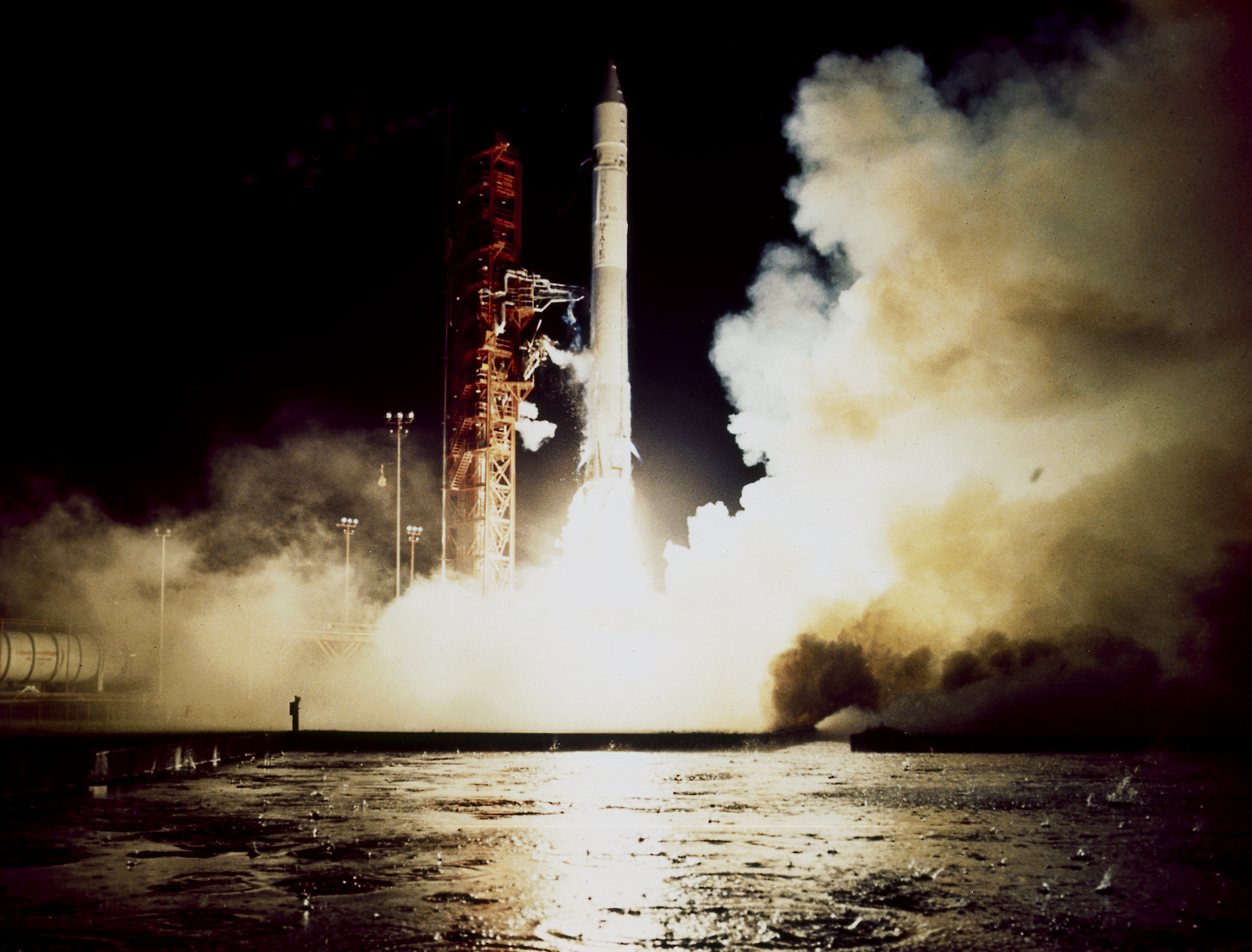
Pioneer 11 lifted off atop an Atlas-Centaur.

Animation of Pioneer 11's trajectory from April 6, 1973, to December 31, 1980 Pioneer 11 · Earth · Jupiter · Saturn

Pioneer 11 was launched on April 6, 1973, at 02:11:00 UTC from Cape Canaveral Launch Complex 36B in Florida aboard an Atlas-Centaur launch vehicle with a Star-37E upper stage. Its twin spacecraft, Pioneer 10, had been launched on March 3, 1972.

Pioneer 11 was initially launched on a direct trajectory to Jupiter without any gravity assists. In May 1974, mission controllers adjusted its trajectory to pass Jupiter on a north-to-south path, enabling a flyby of Saturn in 1979. The maneuver used 17 lb (7.7 kg) of propellant, lasted 42 minutes and 36 seconds, and increased the spacecraft's speed by 230 km/h (140 mph). Pioneer 11 also performed two mid-course correction maneuvers, on April 11, 1973, and November 7, 1974.

=== Encounter with Jupiter ===
Animation of Pioneer 11's trajectory around Jupiter from November 30, 1974, to December 5, 1974 Pioneer 11 · Jupiter · Io · Europa · Ganymede · Callisto

Pioneer 11 crossed Jupiter's bow shock on November 25, 1974. It made its closest approach on December 3, passing about 42,500 km (26,400 mi) above the planet's cloud tops, roughly three times closer than Pioneer 10. Traveling at more than 171,000 km/h (106,000 mph), Pioneer 11 was the fastest human-made object at the time. Despite its closer approach, its higher speed meant that it spent less time in Jupiter's radiation belts than Pioneer 10.

During the encounter, Pioneer 11 crossed Jupiter's bow shock repeatedly, revealing that the boundaries of the planet's magnetosphere shifted in response to the solar wind. The spacecraft returned detailed images of Jupiter, including improved views of the Great Red Spot, and captured the first close-up images of the planet's polar regions. It also took about 200 images of Jupiter's moons, and its measurements refined estimates of Callisto's mass.

Pioneer 11 used Jupiter's gravity to redirect its trajectory toward Saturn and increase its velocity in a gravity-assist maneuver. After the encounter, the micrometeoroid detector was switched off on April 16, 1975, because it was generating spurious commands that interfered with other instruments.

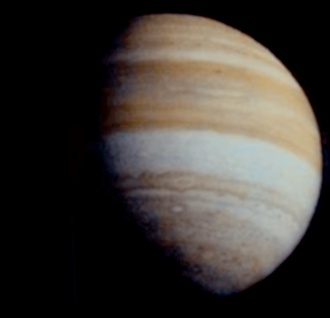
Pioneer 11 Jupiter encounter

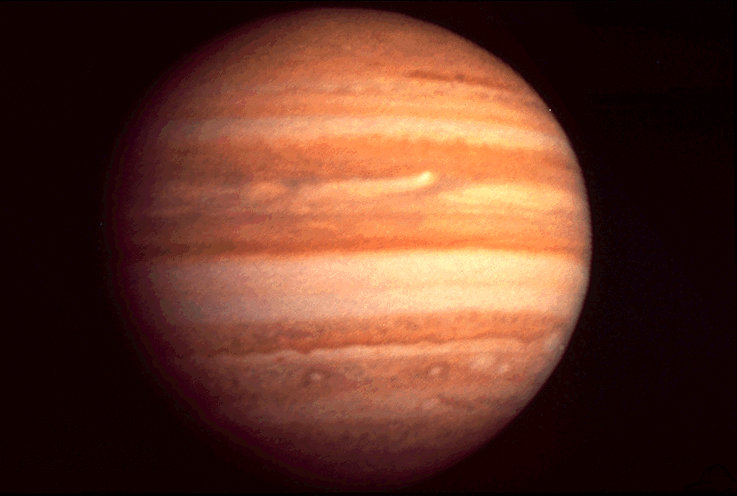
Approach on Jupiter

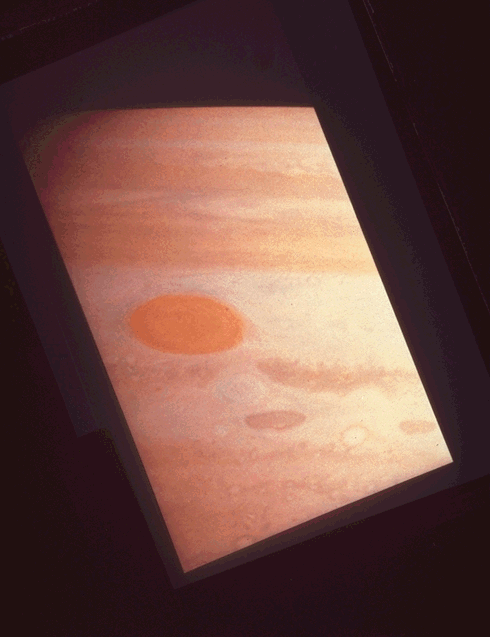
The Great Red Spot imaged by Pioneer 11

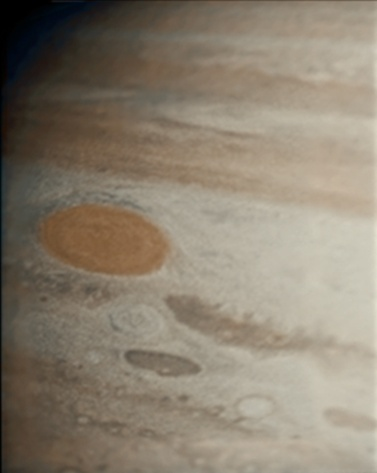
The Great Red Spot prior to closest approach

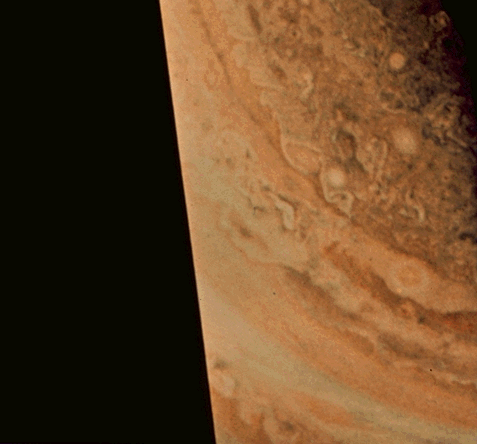
Cloud bands along the edge of Jupiter

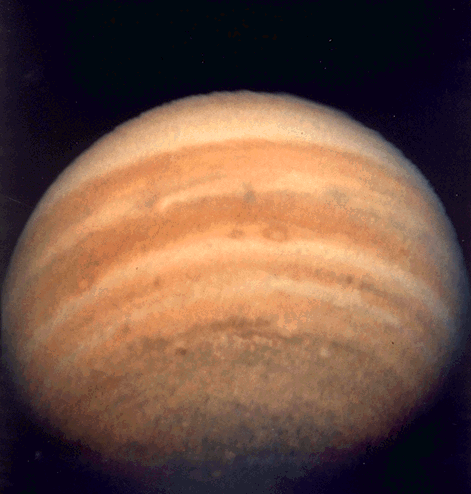
Beginning polar gravity assist

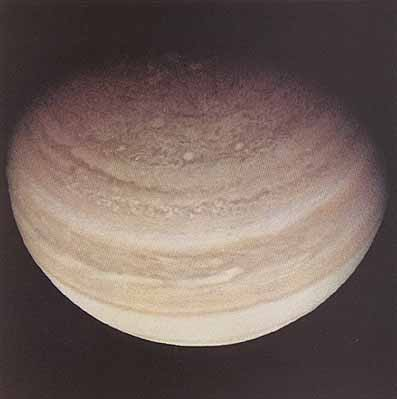
Jupiter polar region from 1,079,000 km

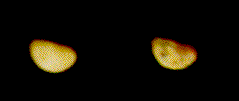
Io imaged from 756,000 km
Media related to Pioneer 11 Jupiter encounter at Wikimedia Commons

=== Encounter with Saturn ===
Animation of Pioneer 11 around Saturn Pioneer 11 · Saturn · Epimetheus · Janus · Mimas · Enceladus

Pioneer 11 flew past Saturn on September 1, 1979, passing about 21,000 km (13,000 mi) above the planet's cloud tops at a speed of 114,000 km/h (71,000 mph). During the encounter, it returned 440 images and collected data on Saturn, its rings, and its moons.

By then, Voyager 1 and Voyager 2 had already flown past Jupiter and were en route to Saturn. Mission planners directed Pioneer 11 to cross Saturn's ring plane along the same path later planned for Voyager 2 on its way to Uranus and Neptune. If hazardous ring particles were present, Pioneer 11 would detect them first, allowing Voyager 2's trajectory to be changed if necessary, although doing so would have prevented its later encounters with the ice giants.

During the flyby, Pioneer 11 passed within roughly 4,000 km (2,500 mi) of one of Saturn's small inner moons. The object was initially identified as Epimetheus, which had been imaged by the spacecraft the previous day and had also been suspected from earlier Earth-based observations. After the Voyager missions revealed that two similarly sized moons, Epimetheus and Janus, share nearly the same orbit, some uncertainty remained about which of the two bodies the spacecraft had approached most closely. The same day, Pioneer 11 flew past Mimas at a distance of approximately 103,000 km (64,000 mi).

In addition to observing Epimetheus, Pioneer 11 detected another previously unknown small moon and a previously unknown ring, mapped Saturn's magnetosphere and magnetic field, and found Titan's surface temperature to be about −193 °C (−315 °F), indicating an environment too cold to support known forms of life. Passing beneath the ring plane, the spacecraft returned images of Saturn's rings from a unique viewing angle. Rings that appear bright when viewed from Earth appeared dark in Pioneer 11's images, while the dark gaps visible from Earth appeared bright.

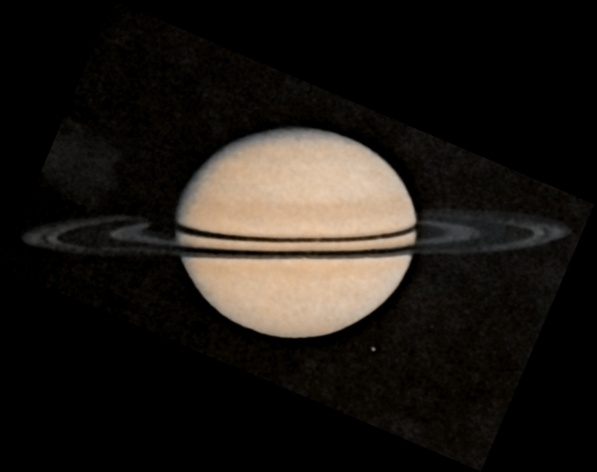
Pioneer 11 image of Saturn taken on August 26, 1979

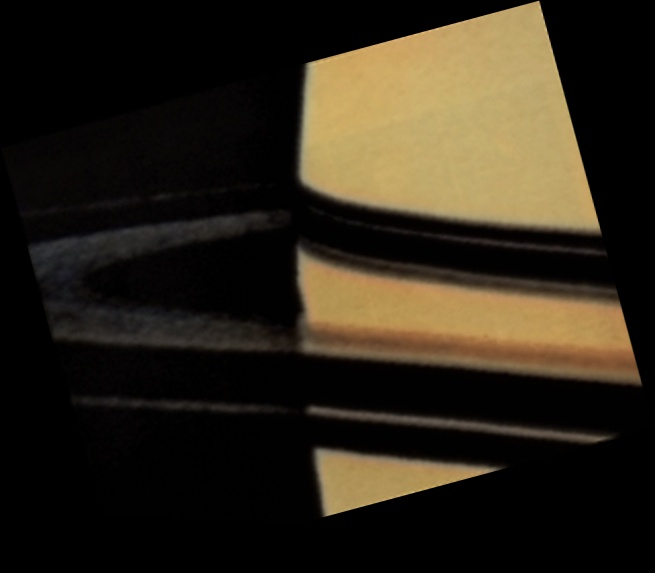
Pioneer 11 image of Saturn taken on September 1, 1979

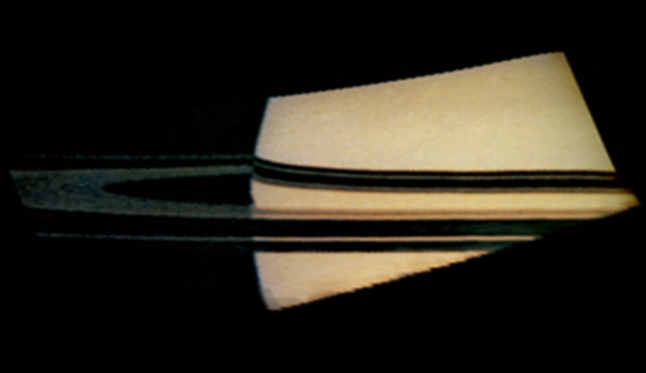
Pioneer 11 image of Saturn taken on September 1, 1979

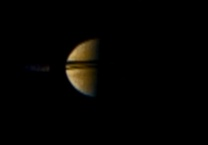
Outgoing Pioneer 11 image of Saturn taken on September 3, 1979

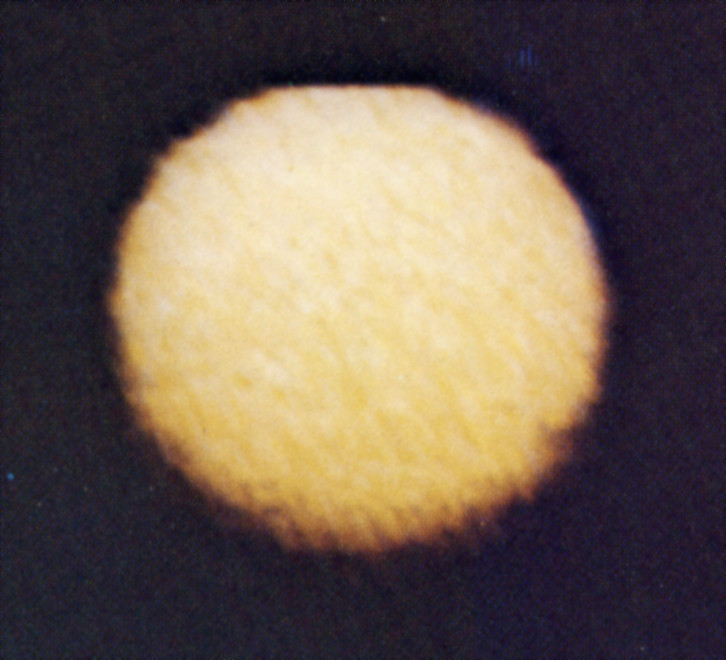
Pioneer 11 image of Saturn's moon Titan
Media related to Pioneer 11 Saturn encounter at Wikimedia Commons

=== Interstellar mission ===
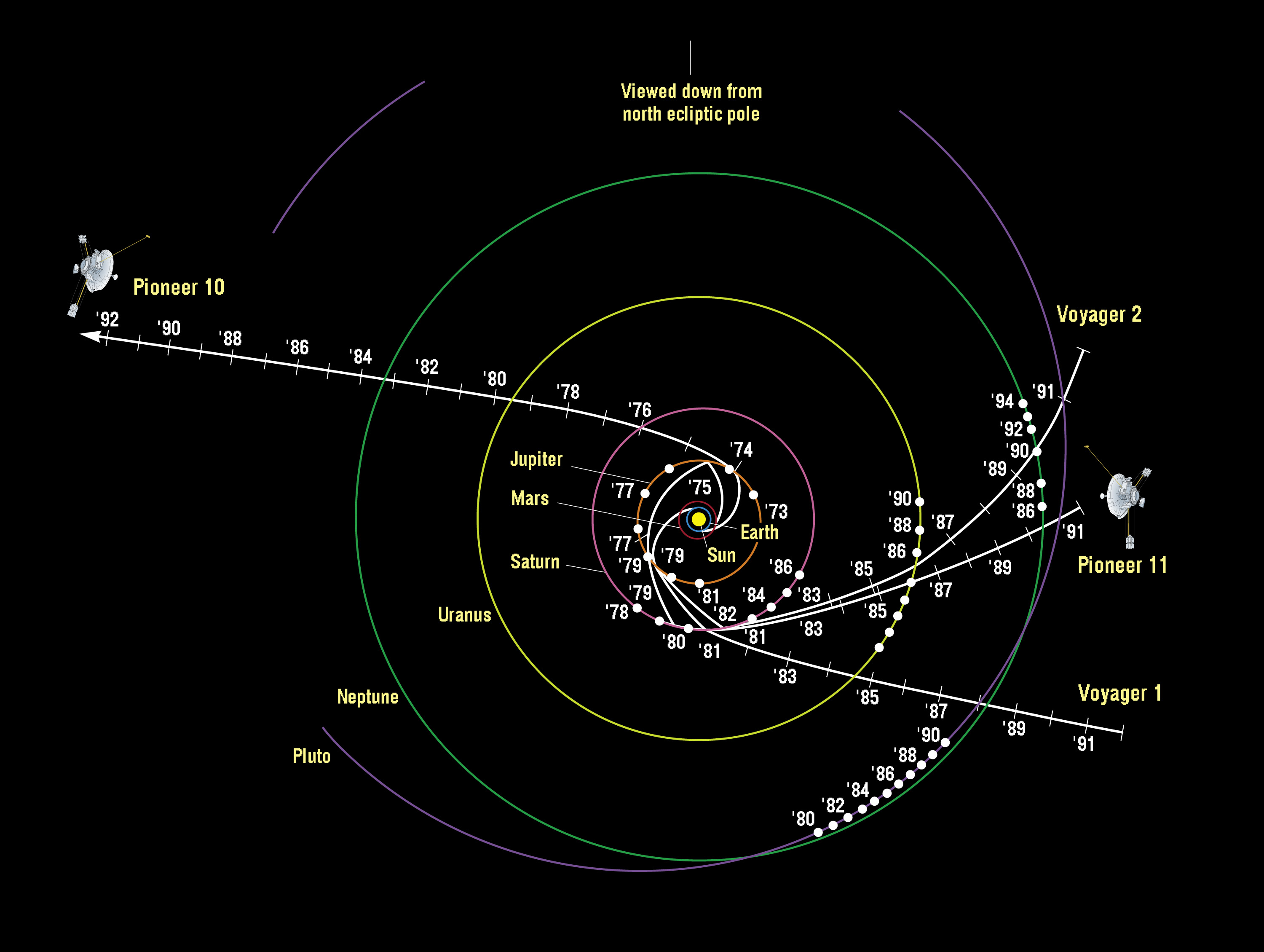
NASA map showing trajectories of the Pioneer 10, Pioneer 11, Voyager 1, and Voyager 2 spacecraft.

On February 25, 1990, Pioneer 11 became the fourth human-made object to pass beyond the orbits of the planets.

By 1995, Pioneer 11 could no longer power any of its scientific instruments, so NASA decided to end routine operations. On September 29, 1995, NASA's Ames Research Center, which managed the mission, announced that the mission would soon end after nearly 22 years of exploration. NASA planned to use its Deep Space Network antennas to listen for the spacecraft's signal once or twice a month until late 1996, when its transmitter was expected to fall silent.

NASA terminated routine contact with Pioneer 11 on September 30, 1995 but continued to contact the spacecraft for about two hours every two to four weeks. Scientists received several minutes of usable engineering data on November 24, 1995, but then lost contact permanently after Earth moved out of the spacecraft's antenna field of view.

=== Timeline ===
Pioneer 10 and 11 speed and distance from the Sun

Heliocentric positions of the five interstellar probes (squares) and other bodies (circles) until 2030, with launch and flyby dates. Markers denote positions on 1 January of each year, with every fifth year labelled. Plot 1 is viewed from the north ecliptic pole, to scale. Plots 2 to 4 are third-angle projections at 20% scale. In the SVG file, hover over a trajectory or orbit to highlight it and its associated launches and flybys.

Timeline of travel

Date	Event
1973-04-06	Spacecraft launched at 02:11:00.
1974-04-19	Passage through the asteroid belt.
1974-11-03	Start Jupiter observation phase.
1974-12-02	Encounter with Jovian system.
08:21:00	Callisto flyby at 786,500 km.
22:09:00	Ganymede flyby at 692,300 km.
1974-12-03	
03:11:00	Io flyby at 314,000 km.
04:15:00	Europa flyby at 586,700 km.
05:00:21	Jupiter shadow entry.
05:01:01	Jupiter occultation entry.
05:21:19	Jupiter closest approach at 42,828 km.
05:33:52	Jupiter shadow exit.
05:43:03	Jupiter occultation exit.
22:29:00	Amalthea flyby at 127,500 km.
1975-01-01	Phase end
1979-07-31	Start Saturn observation phase.
1979-08-29	Encounter with Saturnian system.
06:06:10	Iapetus flyby at 1,032,535 km.
11:53:33	Phoebe flyby at 13,713,574 km.
1979-08-31	
12:32:33	Hyperion flyby at 666,153 km.
1979-09-01	
14:26:56	Descending ring plane crossing.
14:50:55	Epimetheus flyby at 6,676 km.
15:06:32	Atlas flyby at 45,960 km.
15:59:30	Dione flyby at 291,556 km.
16:26:28	Mimas flyby at 104,263 km.
16:29:34	Saturn closest approach at 20,591 km.
16:35:00	Saturn occultation entry.
16:35:57	Saturn shadow entry.
16:51:11	Janus flyby at 228,988 km.
17:53:32	Saturn occultation exit.
17:54:47	Saturn shadow exit.
18:21:59	Ascending ring plane crossing.
18:25:34	Tethys flyby at 329,197 km.
18:30:14	Enceladus flyby at 222,027 km.
20:04:13	Calypso flyby at 109,916 km.
22:15:27	Rhea flyby at 345,303 km.
1979-09-02	
18:00:33	Titan flyby at 362,962 km.
1979-10-05	Phase end
1979-10-05	Begin extended mission.
1990-	Passed the orbit of Pluto.
1995-09-30	NASA officially ended the mission, although contact with the spacecraft continued to obtain telemetry.
1995-11-24	Final signal received from the spacecraft; provided several minutes of usable telemetry.

== Current status ==
As of October 2026, Pioneer 11 is estimated to be 119.6 AU (17.89×10^{9} km; 11.12×10^{9} mi) from Earth and 119.4 AU (17.86 billion km; 11.10 billion mi) from the Sun. It is traveling at 11.155 km/s (40,160 km/h; 24,950 mph) relative to the Sun and receding from the Sun at about 2.35 AU per year. The spacecraft is traveling toward the constellation Scutum, near right ascension 18h 54m and declination -8° 46' (J2000.0), close to Messier 26. In about 928,000 years, it is expected to pass within 0.25 parsecs (0.82 light-years) of the K-type star TYC 992-192-1. It is also expected to pass near Lambda Aquilae in about four million years.

Pioneer 11 has been overtaken by the two Voyager spacecraft launched in 1977. Voyager 1 is now the most distant human-made object and is expected to remain so for the foreseeable future, as no spacecraft launched since Voyager 1 has sufficient speed to overtake it.

== Pioneer anomaly ==
Analysis of radio tracking data from Pioneer 10 and Pioneer 11 at distances of 20 and 70 AU from the Sun revealed a small but persistent anomalous Doppler frequency drift, or gradual change in the frequency of the spacecraft's radio signals. The drift was consistent with a constant acceleration of (8.74 ± 1.33) × 10^{−10} m/s^{2} toward the Sun. Researchers initially suspected an unidentified systematic error, but no clear cause was found, prompting decades of investigation. In 2012, physicist Slava Turyshev and colleagues published analyses showing that the anomaly resulted from uneven thermal radiation emitted by the spacecraft, which produced a small recoil force toward the Sun.

== Pioneer plaque ==
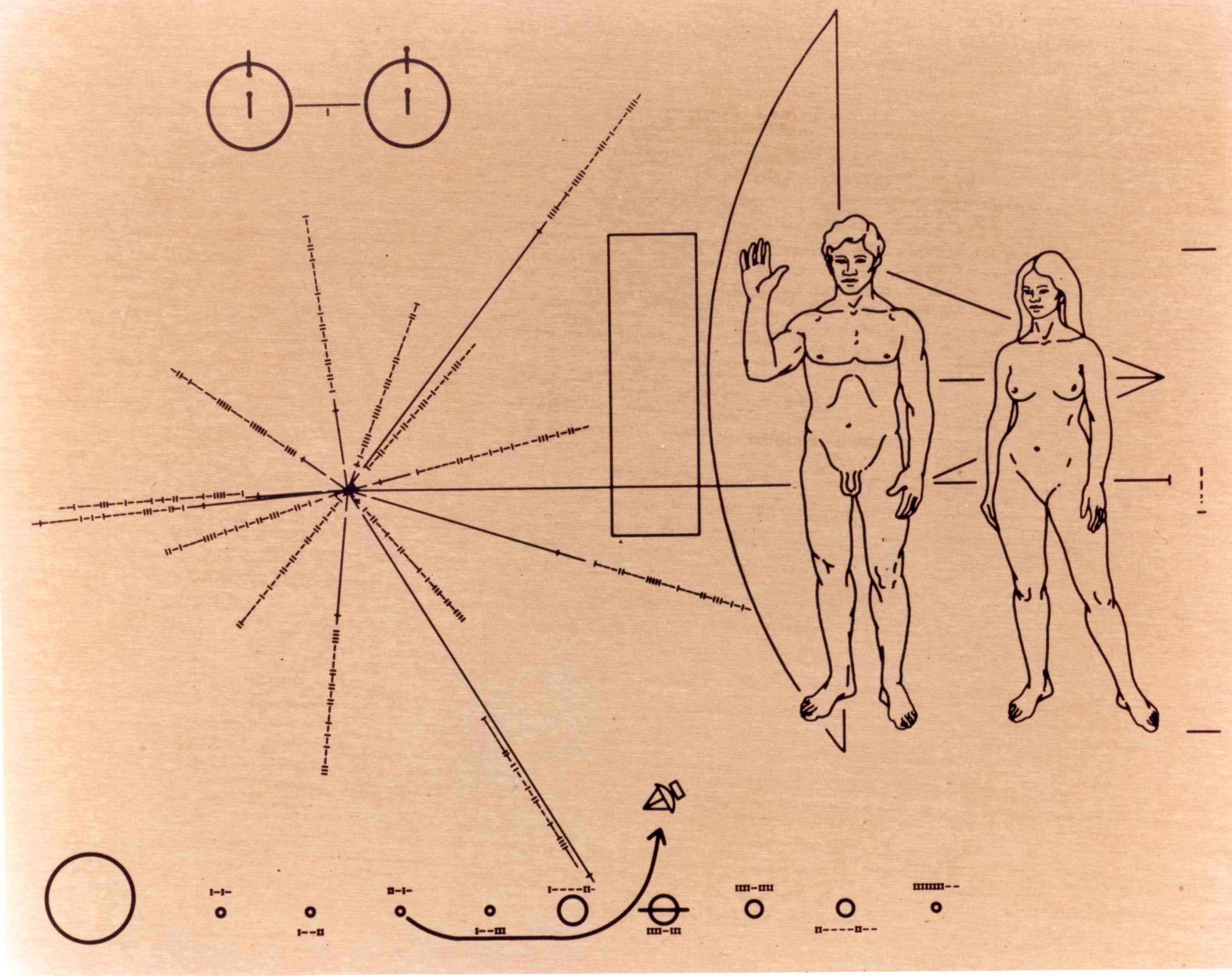
Pioneer plaque

Pioneer 10 and Pioneer 11 each carry a gold-anodized aluminum plaque measuring 152 by 229 mm (6.0 by 9.0 in). The plaque is intended as a message to intelligent extraterrestrial life that might one day discover either spacecraft. It depicts nude human figures, male and female, alongside symbolic diagrams intended to convey the spacecraft's origin.

== Commemoration ==
In 1991, Pioneer 11 was featured on one of 10 United States Postal Service stamps commemorating uncrewed spacecraft that had explored the then-known nine planets and the Moon. Pioneer 11 was depicted on the stamp dedicated to Jupiter. Pluto was labeled "Not yet explored".

== See also ==
- Exploration of Jupiter
- Exploration of Saturn
  - Exploration of Titan
- List of missions to the outer planets
- Timeline of artificial satellites and space probes
