= Janus (moon) =

Moon of Saturn

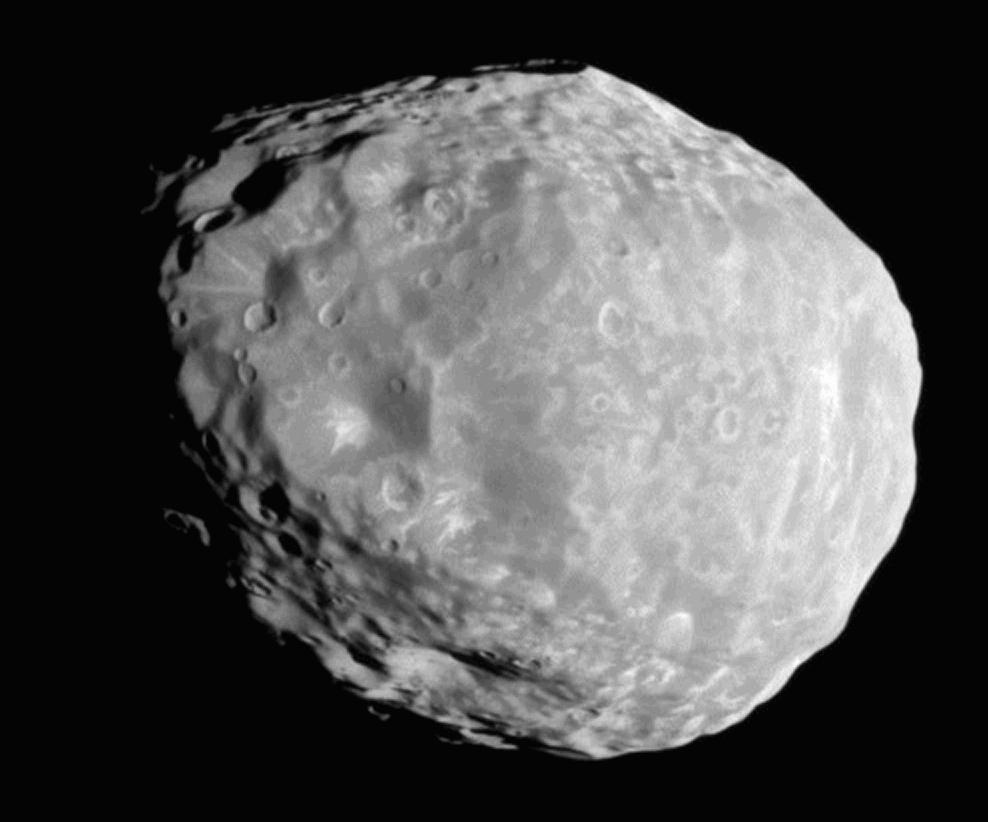
- Janus as imaged by Cassini on 7 April 2010: highest-resolution full-disk image to date

Discovery
- Discovered by: Audouin Dollfus
- Discovery date: 15 December 1966

Designations
- Designation: Saturn X
- Pronunciation: /ˈdʒeɪnəs/
- Named after: Jānus
- Adjectives: Janian /ˈdʒeɪniən/

Orbital characteristics (Note: Janus switched to the outer orbit in 2002 and 2010, and to the inner orbit in 2006 and 2014.)
- Semi-major axis: 151441 km (inner); 151462 km (outer)
- Eccentricity: 0.0068
- Orbital period (sidereal): 0.694517 d (inner); 0.694661 d (outer)
- Inclination: 0.164°
- Satellite of: Saturn

Physical characteristics
- Dimensions: 203.4 × 185.8 × 149.0 km (± 1.8 × 0.6 × 0.6 km)
- Mean diameter: 178.0±1.0 km
- Volume: 2953010±950 km^{3}
- Mass: (1.89388±0.00028)×10^{18} kg (Note: Calculated from the standard gravitational parameter GM = 0.126403±0.000019 km^{3}·s^{–2} given by Lainey et al. (2023), divided by the gravitational constant G = 6.6743×10^{−2} km^{3}·kg^{–1}·s^{–2}.)
- Mean density: 0.6413±0.0002 g/cm^{3}
- Surface gravity: 0.0111–0.0169 m/s^{2}
- Escape velocity: 0.05 km/s at longest axis to 0.058 km/s at poles
- Synodic rotation period: synchronous
- Axial tilt: zero
- Albedo: 0.71±0.02 (geometric)
- Temperature: 76 K

Janus /ˈdʒeɪnəs/ is an inner satellite of Saturn. It is named after the mythological Janus, the Roman god of beginnings. This natural satellite was first identified by Audouin Dollfus on December 15, 1966, although it had been unknowingly photographed earlier by Jean Texereau. Further observations led to the realization that Janus shares a unique orbital relationship with another moon, Epimetheus. The discovery of these two moons' peculiar co-orbital configuration was later confirmed by Voyager 1 in 1980.

== History ==
=== Discovery ===
Janus was identified by Audouin Dollfus on 15 December 1966 and given the temporary designation S/1966 S 2. Previously, Jean Texereau had photographed Janus on 29 October 1966 without realising it. On 18 December, Richard Walker observed an object in the same orbit as Janus, but whose position could not be reconciled with the previous observations. Twelve years later, in October 1978, Stephen M. Larson and John W. Fountain realised that the 1966 observations were best explained by two distinct objects (Janus and Epimetheus) sharing very similar orbits; Walker is now credited with the discovery of Epimetheus. Voyager 1 confirmed this orbital configuration in 1980.

=== Observational history ===
Janus was observed on subsequent occasions and given different provisional designations. Pioneer 11's three energetic-particle detectors detected its "shadow" when the probe flew by Saturn on 1 September 1979 (S/1979 S 2). Janus was observed by Dan Pascu on 19 February 1980 (S/1980 S 1), and then by John W. Fountain, Stephen M. Larson, Harold J. Reitsema and Bradford A. Smith on 23 February 1980 (S/1980 S 2).

=== Name ===
Janus is named after the two-faced Roman god Janus. Although the name was informally proposed soon after the initial 1966 discovery, it was not officially adopted until 1983, (Note: Transactions of the International Astronomical Union, Vol. XVIIIA, 1982 (confirms Janus, names Epimetheus, Telesto, Calypso) (mentioned in IAUC 3872: Satellites of Jupiter and Saturn, September 30, 1983)) when Epimetheus was also named.

== Orbit ==
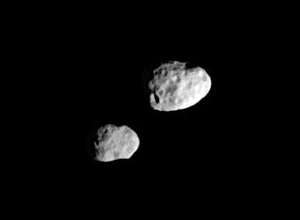
Epimetheus (lower left) and Janus (right) seen on 20 March 2006, two months after swapping orbits. The two moons appear close only because of foreshortening; in reality, Janus is about 40,000 km farther from Cassini than Epimetheus.

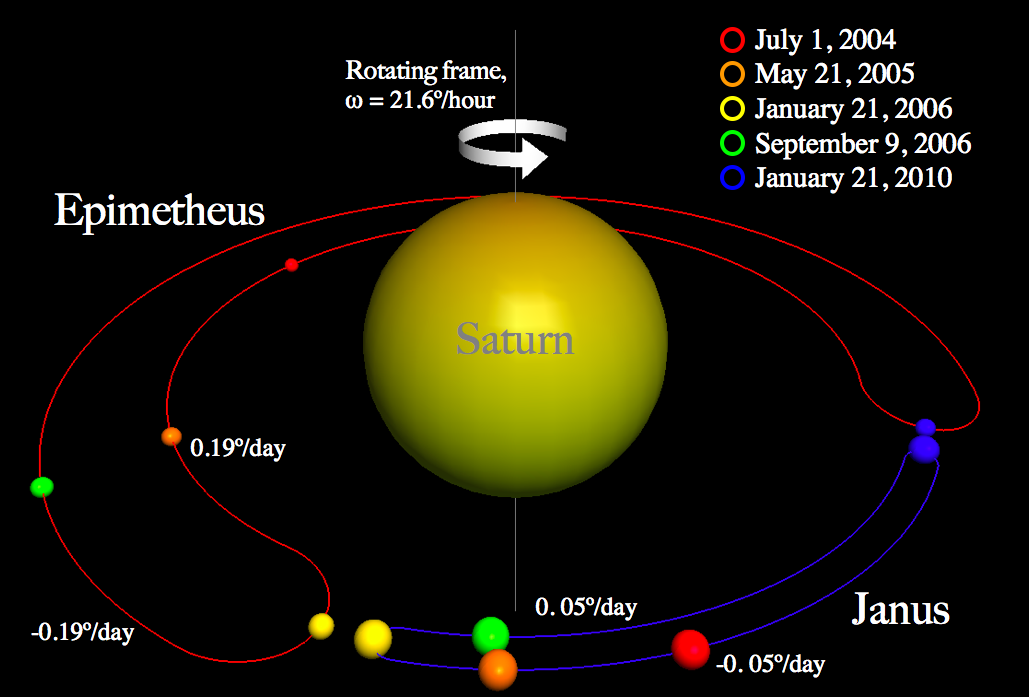
Rotating-frame depiction of the horseshoe orbits of Janus and Epimetheus

Animation of Epimetheus's orbit – Rotating reference frame Saturn · Janus · Epimetheus

Janus's orbit is co-orbital with that of Epimetheus. Janus's mean orbital radius from Saturn is, as of 2006 (as shown by the green color in the picture below), only 50 km less than that of Epimetheus, a distance smaller than either moon's mean radius.

In accordance with Kepler's laws of planetary motion, the object which is closer to Saturn completes its orbit more quickly. The orbit is completed only around 30 seconds more quickly, due to the small difference between the moons' distances from Saturn. Each day, the inner moon progresses 0.25° more around Saturn than the outer moon. As the inner moon catches up to the outer moon, their mutual gravitational attraction increases the inner moon's momentum and decreases that of the outer moon. This added momentum causes the inner moon's distance from Saturn and its orbital period to increase while those of the outer moon are decreased.

The timing and magnitude of the momentum exchange is such that the moons effectively swap orbits, never approaching closer than about 10,000 km to each other. At each encounter Janus's orbital radius changes by ~20 km and Epimetheus's by ~80 km: Janus's orbit is less affected because it is four times the mass of Epimetheus. The exchange of orbits takes place approximately every four years; the last close approaches occurred in January 2006, 2010, 2014, 2018, and 2022.

This type of orbit is sometimes referred to as a horseshoe orbit, due to the shape of each moon's orbit, as seen from the perspective of the other moon. The two librate about their mutual L_{4} and L_{5} Lagrange points. Some asteroids are known to have horseshoe orbits but this is the only known such orbital configuration for moons within the Solar System.

The orbital relationship between Janus and Epimetheus can be understood in terms of the circular restricted three-body problem, as a case in which the two moons (the third body being Saturn) are similar in size to each other.

In the far future, the two moons' orbits will migrate outward due to their gravitational interactions with the A Ring, which will probably cause their co-orbital configuration to collapse into one where Epimetheus librates around Janus' L_{4} or L_{5} point, becoming a trojan of Janus.

== Physical characteristics ==
Janus is extensively cratered with several craters larger than 30 km and has few linear features. Janus's surface appears to be older than Prometheus's but younger than Pandora's. Janus has a very low density and relatively high albedo, meaning that it is likely icy in composition and structurally a rubble pile object.

=== Features ===
Craters on Janus, like those on Epimetheus, are named after characters in the legend of Castor and Pollux.

Named Janian craters
Name	Pronunciation	Greek
Castor	/ˈkæstər/	Κάστωρ
Idas	/ˈaɪdəs/	Ἴδας
Lynceus	/ˈlɪnsiːəs/	Λυγκεύς
Phoibe (of Messenia)	/ˈfɔɪbiː/	Φοίβη

== Interactions with rings ==
A faint dust ring is present around the region occupied by the orbits of Janus and Epimetheus, as revealed by images taken in forward-scattered light by the Cassini spacecraft in 2006. The ring has a radial extent of about 5000 km. Its source is particles blasted off their surfaces by meteoroid impacts, which then form a diffuse ring around their orbital paths.

Along with Epimetheus, Janus acts as a shepherd moon, maintaining the sharp outer edge of the A Ring in a 7:6 orbital resonance. The effect is more obvious when the more massive Janus is on the resonant (inner) orbit.

== Gallery ==
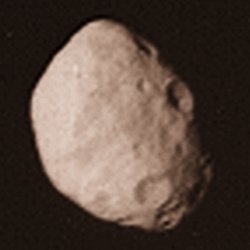
Janus as viewed by Voyager 2 (1981-08-25).

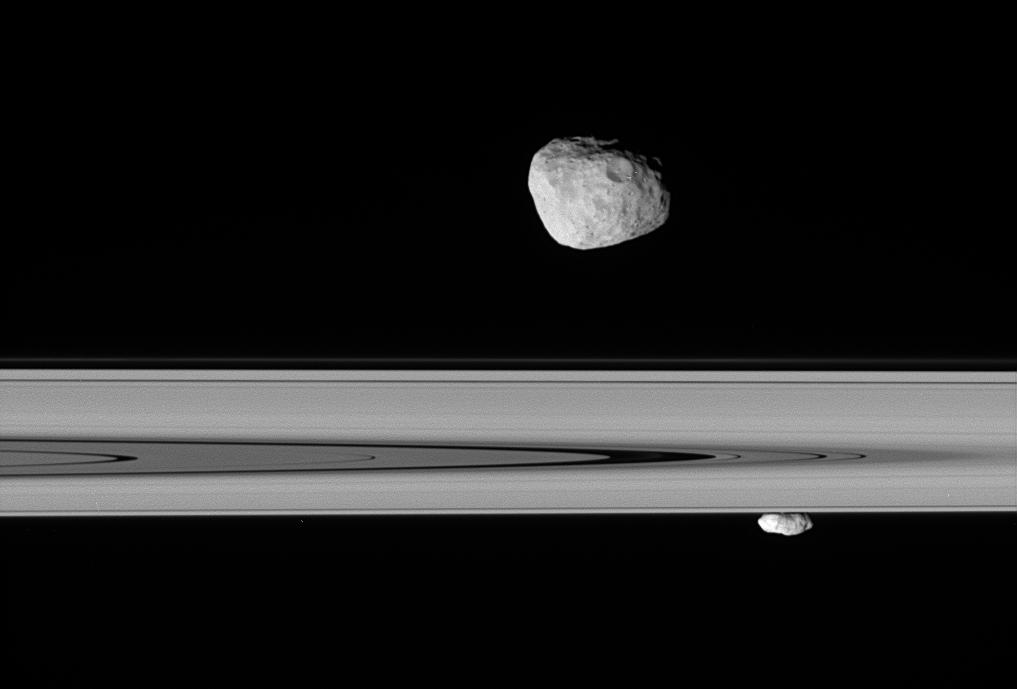
Janus and Prometheus lie above and below Saturn's rings (2006-04-29).

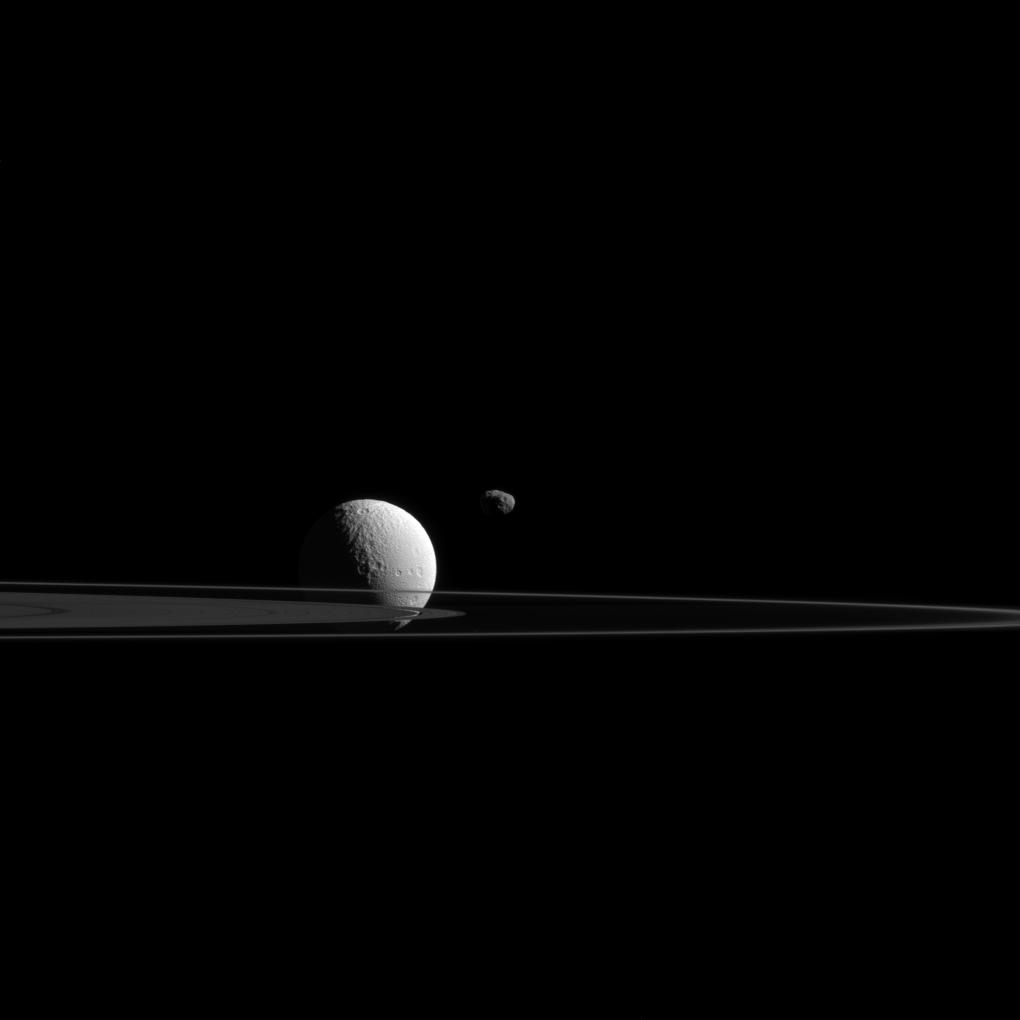
Janus and Tethys (foreground) near Saturn's rings (2015-10-27).

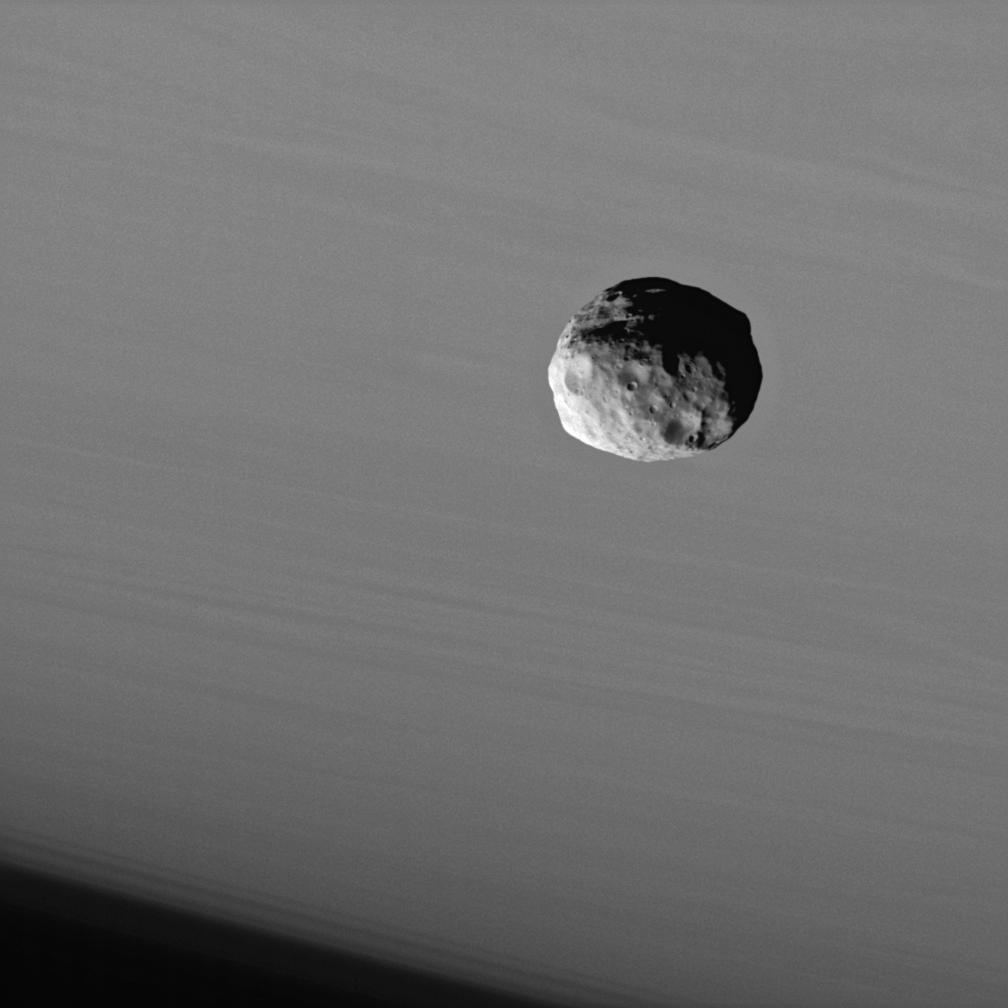
Janus in front of Saturn as imaged by Cassini (2006-09-25).

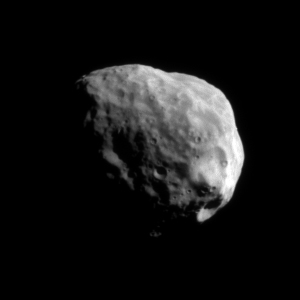
Janus as imaged by Cassini (2008-02-20).

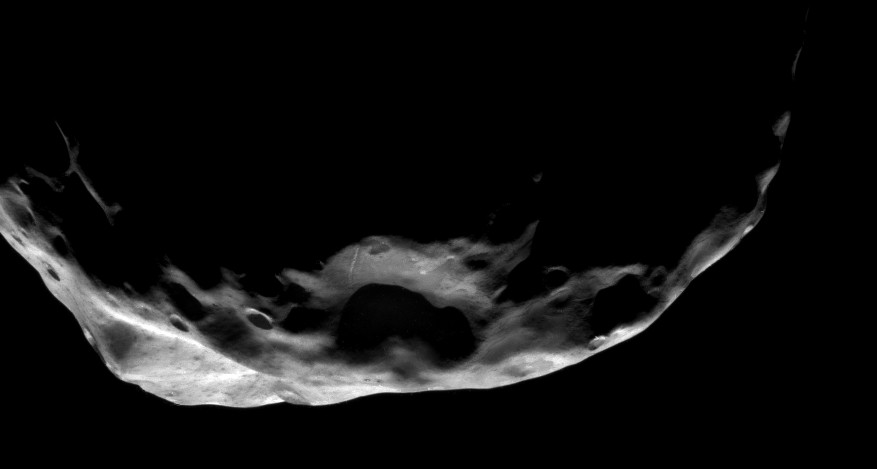
Crescent Janus (2008-06-30).
