= Robert E. Wilson (astrophysicist) =

American astrophysicist and academic (b. 1937)

- Born: January 16, 1937 (age 89)
- Occupations: Astrophysicist, academic, and author
- Awards: Max Planck-Humboldt Research Award, Alexander von Humboldt Foundation/Max Planck Institute for Astrophysics (1979)

Academic background
- Education: University of Pennsylvania (PhD)

Academic work
- Institutions: University of Florida

Robert E. Wilson is an astrophysicist, academic, and author. He is a professor emeritus at the University of Florida (UF).

Wilson's research covers various aspects of astrophysics including stellar models, stellar structure and evolution, and close binary stars. He has co-edited and co-authored books on astrophysical topics, and his research has received awards such as the Humboldt Prize from Germany's Alexander von Humboldt Foundation.

Wilson is a member of the American Astronomical Society, the Royal Astronomical Society, the Astronomical Society of the Pacific, the Norristown (PA) Eisenhower High School Hall of Fame, and the International Astronomical Union.

== Education ==
Wilson completed his PhD from the University of Pennsylvania in 1963.

== Career ==
Wilson started his career as an assistant professor at Georgetown University (1963–66). He was associate professor at the University of South Florida (1966–69), and then Professor at the same institution (1969 to 1979). At the University of Florida (UF) he served as Professor from 1979 to 2007. He then was appointed professor emeritus at UF and continues to publish in the field of astronomy.

Wilson has been a National Research Council Associate at the Goddard Institute for Space Studies in New York City (1972–74); guest at the Max Planck Institute for Astrophysics in Garching, Germany (1979–80); Visiting Scientist at the UCLA Department of Astronomy (1986–87); and Visiting Scientist at the Indiana University Astronomy Department (2013–15).

== Research ==
Wilson's astrophysics research spans stellar structural and evolutionary models and close binary stars, with conceptual innovations. He co-edited the book Astrophysical Disks with S.F Dermott and J.H Hunter (1992), featuring contributions from experts and covering topics in non-linear astrophysics. He also co-edited Waves in Astrophysics with J.H. Hunter (1995), which explored applications of chaos theory and non-linear dynamics within scenarios such as circumstellar disks, collimated outflows, the interstellar medium, galaxies, and pulsating stars. Earlier, he published the book Binary Stars: A Pictorial Atlas with D. Terrell and J. Mukherjee, which showcased binary star systems through computer generated illustrations of their dimensions, orbits, and figures. T.D. Oswalt (Florida Institute of Technology) remarked "Both amateurs and professionals will enjoy looking up, via the convenient index, those binaries that they have actually observed and read about elsewhere – I certainly have found myself looking up all my favorites."

=== Binary stars ===
Wilson's earlier work led the move from geometric binary system models to physical models that directly treat tides, gravity brightening, star-star heating and re-radiation, and other physical phenomena. His computational revision of reflection has enhanced the synthesis of the effect, improving accuracy, generality, and efficiency, simplifying the implementation of multiple reflections by setting a control integer to 1 for one "bounce," 2 for two bounces, and so forth.

Advances of those times, the late 1960s to early 1990s, have been explained in Wilson's invited reviews such as his article on Binary Stars in the Publications of the Astronomical Society of the Pacific. His ideas have completed the set of four morphological types of binaries – detached, semi-detached, overcontact, and double contact, which originated with Zdenek Kopal's definitions of the first two types in his book Close Binary Systems. Additionally, his analytic modeling of self-gravitating semi-transparent circumstellar disks has now been augmented to include star and interior disk irradiation.

== Awards and honors ==
- 1979 – Max Planck-Humboldt Research Award, Alexander von Humboldt Foundation/Max Planck Institute for Astrophysics, Germany

== Bibliography ==
=== Selected books ===
- Binary Stars: A Pictorial Atlas (1992) ISBN 9780894640414
- Astrophysical Disks (Annals of the New York Academy of Sciences) (1992) ISBN 9780897667401
- Waves in Astrophysics (1995) ISBN 9780801863035

=== Selected articles ===
- Wilson, R. E., & Devinney, E. J. (1971). Realization of accurate close-binary light curves: application to MR Cygni. Astrophysical Journal, 166, 605.
- Wilson, R. E., & Biermann, P. (1976). TX Cancri-Which component is hotter. Astronomy and Astrophysics, 48(3), 349–357.
- Wilson, R. E. (1979). Eccentric orbit generalization and simultaneous solution of binary star light and velocity curves. Astrophysical Journal, Part 1, 234, 1054–1066.
- Wilson, R. E. (1990). Accuracy and efficiency in the binary star reflection effect. Astrophysical Journal, Part 1 ISSN 0004-637X, 356, 613–622.
- Wilson, R. E. (1994). Binary star light-curve models. Publications of the Astronomical Society of the Pacific, 106, 921.
- Wilson, R. E. (2018). Self-gravitating Semi-transparent Circumstellar Disks: An Analytic Model. The Astrophysical Journal, 869(1), 19.
