= Epimetheus (moon) =

Moon of Saturn

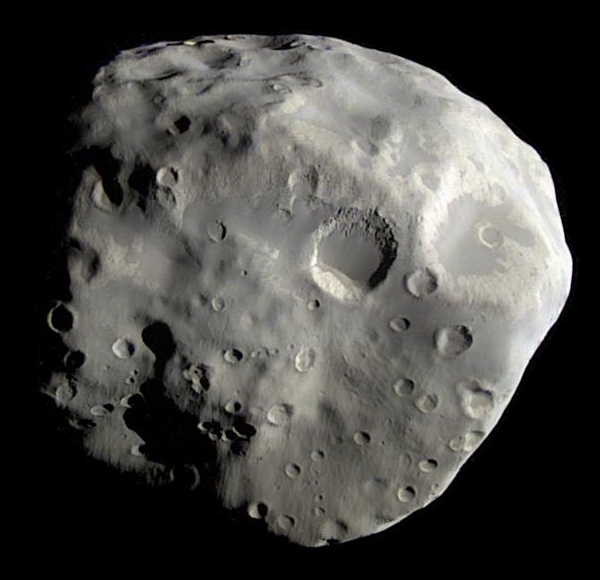
- South pole of Epimetheus imaged by Cassini on 3 December 2007

Discovery
- Discovered by: Richard Walker
- Discovery date: 18 December 1966

Designations
- Designation: Saturn XI
- Pronunciation: /ɛpəˈmiːθiːəs/
- Named after: Ἐπιμηθεύς Epimētheus
- Adjectives: Epimethean /ɛpəˈmiːθiːən/

Orbital characteristics (Note: Epimetheus switched to the inner orbit in 2002 and 2010, and to the outer orbit in 2006 and 2014.)
- Semi-major axis: 151414 km (inner); 151489 km (outer)
- Eccentricity: 0.0097
- Orbital period (sidereal): 0.694329 d (inner); 0.694850 d (outer)
- Inclination: 0.352°
- Satellite of: Saturn

Physical characteristics
- Dimensions: 129.6 × 116.2 × 107.0 km (± 0.6 × 0.4 × 0.4 km)
- Mean diameter: 117.2±0.6 km
- Volume: 843290±2000 km^{3}
- Mass: (5.25607±0.00081)×10^{17} kg (Note: Calculated from the standard gravitational parameter GM = (3.50806±0.00054)×10^{−2} km^{3}·s^{–2} given by Lainey et al. (2023), divided by the gravitational constant G = 6.6743×10^{−2} km^{3}·kg^{–1}·s^{–2}.)
- Mean density: 0.6233±0.0015 g/cm^{3}
- Surface gravity: 0.0066–0.0109 m/s^{2}
- Escape velocity: 0.033 km/s at longest axis to 0.036 km/s at poles
- Synodic rotation period: Synchronous
- Axial tilt: zero
- Albedo: 0.73±0.03 (geometric)
- Temperature: 90±3 K

Epimetheus /ɛpəˈmiːθiːəs/ is an inner satellite of Saturn. It is named after the titan Epimetheus, the brother of Prometheus and son of Iapetus.

== Discovery ==
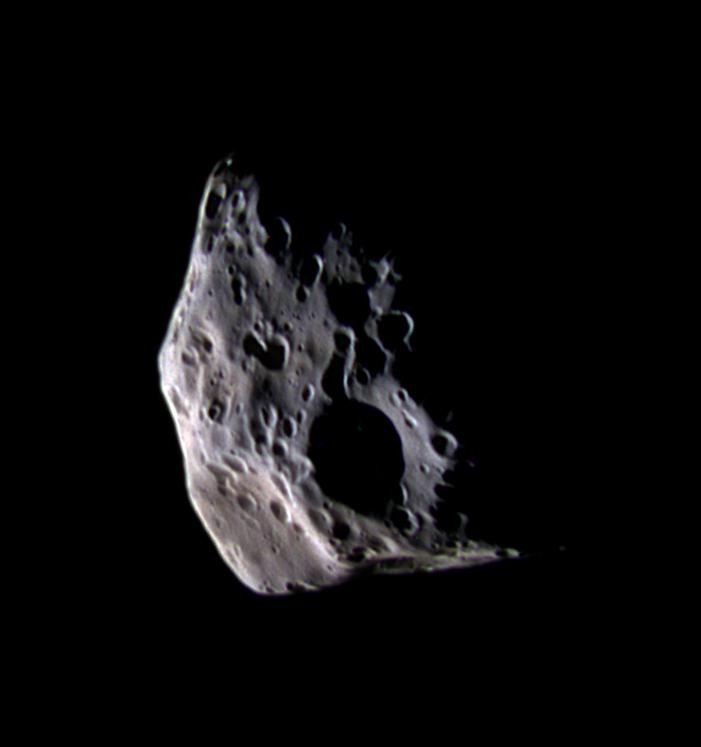
Epimetheus

Epimetheus occupies essentially the same orbit as the moon Janus. Astronomers originally assumed that there was only one body in that orbit, disbelieving that two moons could share nearly identical orbits without eventually colliding. Thus, there was difficulty in determining their orbital characteristics. Observations were photographic and spaced widely apart in time, so that while the presence of two objects was obvious, the observations were difficult to reconcile with a reasonable orbit.

Audouin Dollfus observed a moon on 15 December 1966, which he proposed to be named "Janus". On 18 December, Richard Walker made a similar observation which is now credited as the discovery of Epimetheus. However, at the time, it was believed that there was only one moon, unofficially known as "Janus", in the given orbit.

Twelve years later, in October 1978, Stephen M. Larson and John W. Fountain realised that the 1966 observations were best explained by two distinct objects (Janus and Epimetheus) sharing very similar orbits. This was confirmed in 1980 by Voyager 1, and so Larson and Fountain officially share the discovery of Epimetheus with Walker. A moon that was probably Epimetheus appeared in two Pioneer 11 images and was designated S/1979 S 1, though there is uncertainty because the two images were not enough to allow a reliable orbit to be calculated.

Epimetheus received its name in 1983. (Note: Transactions of the International Astronomical Union, Vol. XVIIIA, 1982 (confirms Janus, names Epimetheus, Telesto, Calypso) (mentioned in IAUC 3872: Satellites of Jupiter and Saturn 1983 September 30)) The name Janus was approved by the IAU at the same time, although the name had been used informally since Dollfus proposed it shortly after the 1966 discovery.

== Orbit ==
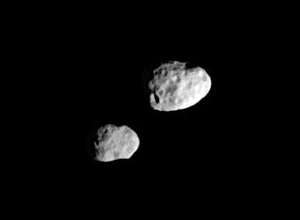
Epimetheus (lower left) and Janus (right) seen on 20 March 2006, two months after swapping orbits. The two moons appear close only because of foreshortening; in reality, Janus is about 40,000 km farther from Cassini than Epimetheus.

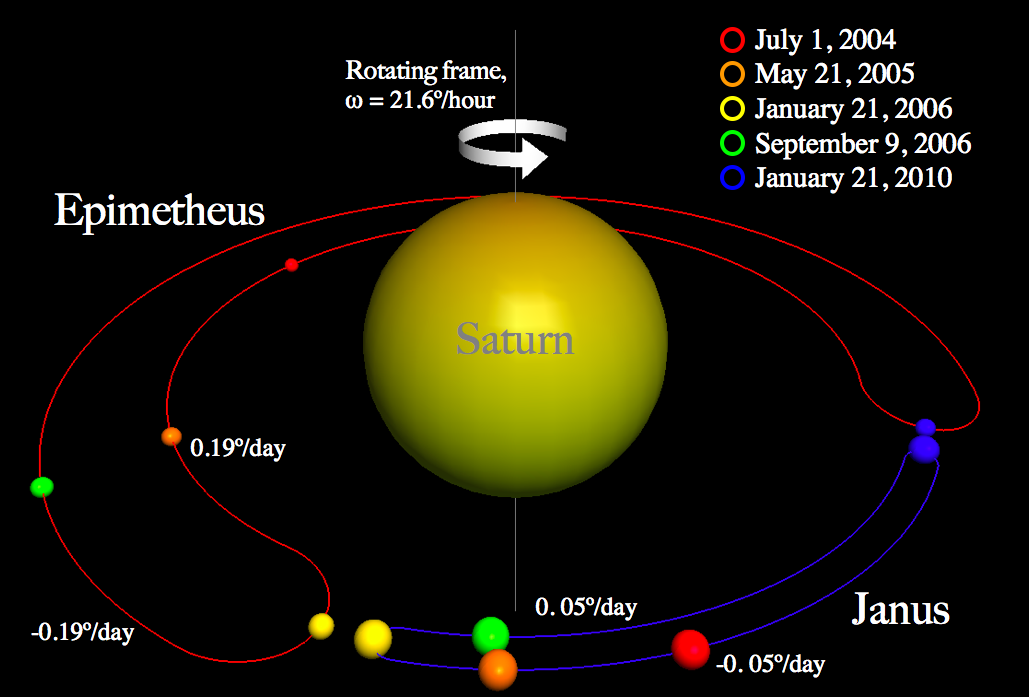
Rotating-frame depiction of the horseshoe orbits of Janus and Epimetheus

Animation of Epimetheus's orbit – Rotating reference frame Saturn · Janus · Epimetheus

Epimetheus's orbit is co-orbital with that of Janus. Janus's mean orbital radius from Saturn is, as of 2006 (as shown by the green color in the picture below), only 50 km less than that of Epimetheus, a distance smaller than either moon's mean radius.

In accordance with Kepler's laws of planetary motion, the object which is closer to Saturn completes its orbit more quickly. The orbit is completed only around 30 seconds more quickly, due to the small difference between the moons' distances from Saturn. Each day, the inner moon progresses 0.25° more around Saturn than the outer moon. As the inner moon catches up to the outer moon, their mutual gravitational attraction increases the inner moon's momentum and decreases that of the outer moon. This added momentum causes the inner moon's distance from Saturn and its orbital period to increase while those of the outer moon are decreased.

The timing and magnitude of the momentum exchange is such that the moons effectively swap orbits, never approaching closer than about 10,000 km to each other. At each encounter Janus's orbital radius changes by ~20 km and Epimetheus's by ~80 km: Janus's orbit is less affected because it is four times the mass of Epimetheus. The exchange of orbits takes place approximately every four years; the last close approaches occurred in January 2006, 2010, 2014, 2018, and 2022.

This type of orbit is sometimes referred to as a horseshoe orbit, due to the shape of each moon's orbit, as seen from the perspective of the other moon. The two librate about their mutual L_{4} and L_{5} Lagrange points. Some asteroids are known to have horseshoe orbits but this is the only known such orbital configuration for moons within the Solar System. The orbital relationship between Janus and Epimetheus can be understood in terms of the circular restricted three-body problem, as a case in which the two moons (the third body being Saturn) are similar in size to each other.

In the far future, the two moons' orbits will migrate outward due to their gravitational interactions with the A Ring, which will probably cause their co-orbital configuration to collapse into one where Epimetheus librates around Janus' L_{4} or L_{5} point, becoming a trojan of Janus.

While Epimetheus is the outer moon relative to Janus, it participates in both a 15:17 mean-motion resonance with Prometheus and a 19:21 mean-motion resonance with Pandora. No state of resonance exists while Epimetheus is on the inner orbit or for Janus in general.

== Physical characteristics ==
There are several Epimethean craters larger than 30 km in diameter, as well as both large and small ridges and grooves. The extensive cratering indicates that Epimetheus must be quite old. Janus and Epimetheus may have formed from a disruption of a single parent to form co-orbital satellites, but if this is the case the disruption must have happened early in the history of the satellite system. From its very low density and relatively high albedo, it seems likely that Epimetheus is a very porous icy body. There is considerable uncertainty in these values, however, and so this remains to be confirmed.

The south pole is dominated by a large, flat basin with a central peak that covers much of the moon's southern hemisphere, which may be the remains of a large impact crater.

There appear to be two terrain types: darker, smoother areas, and brighter, slightly more yellowish, fractured terrain. One interpretation is that the darker material evidently moves down slopes, and probably has a lower ice content than the brighter material, which appears more like "bedrock". Nonetheless, materials in both terrains are likely to be rich in water ice.

=== Features ===
Craters on Epimetheus, like those on Janus, are named after characters in the legend of Castor and Pollux.

Named Epimethean craters
Name	Pronunciation	Latin or Greek
Hilaeira	/hɪleɪˈɪərə/	Ἱλάειρα
Pollux	/ˈpɒləks/	Pollūx

The first has been misspelled 'Hilairea' at USGS, which would presumably be pronounced /hɪˈlɛəriə/.

== Interactions with rings ==
A faint dust ring is present around the region occupied by the orbits of Epimetheus and Janus, as revealed by images taken in forward-scattered light by the Cassini spacecraft in 2006. The ring has a radial extent of about 5000 km. Its source are particles blasted off their surfaces by meteoroid impacts, which then form a diffuse ring around their orbital paths.

Along with Janus, Epimetheus acts as a shepherd moon, maintaining the sharp outer edge of the A Ring in a 7:6 orbital resonance. The effect is more obvious when the more massive Janus is on the resonant (inner) orbit.

== Gallery ==
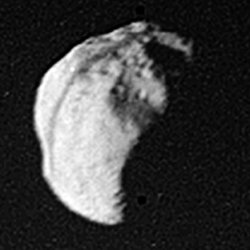
Epimetheus crossed by the shadow of the F Ring, as imaged by Voyager 1 (NASA)

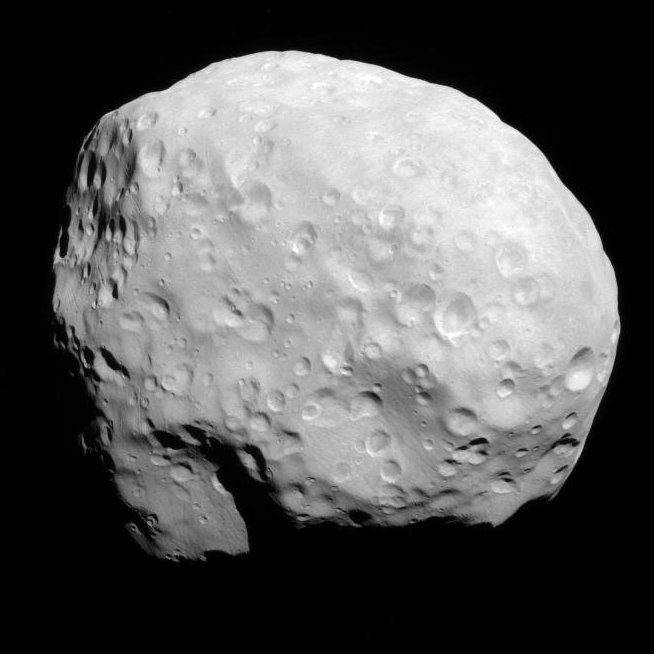
Epimetheus - flyby
(6 December 2015)

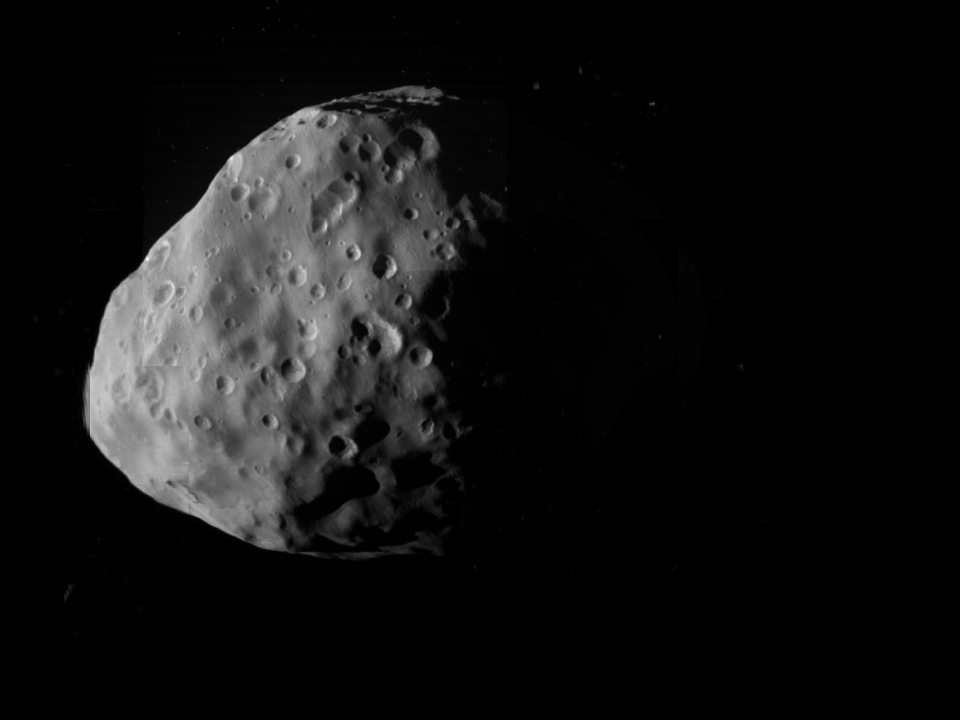
Mosaic of five images during February 2017 flyby
