= Prometheus (moon) =

Moon of Saturn

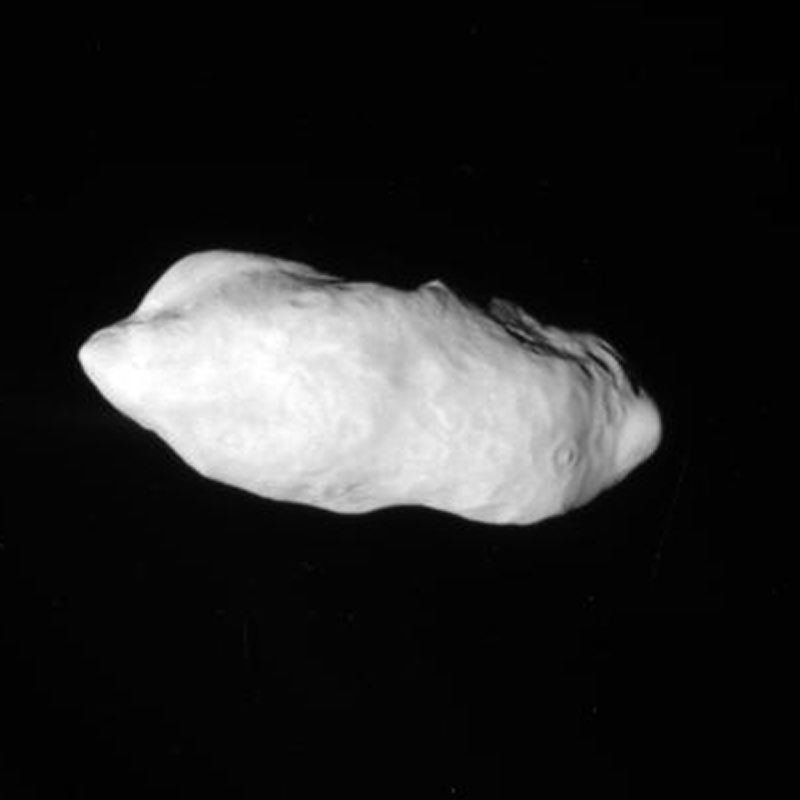
- Prometheus image from Cassini (December 26, 2009)

Discovery
- Discovered by: Stewart A. Collins; D. Carlson; Voyager 1
- Discovery date: 24 October 1980

Designations
- Designation: Saturn XVI
- Pronunciation: /prəˈmiːθiːəs/
- Named after: Προμηθεύς Promētheys
- Adjectives: Promethean, -ian /prəˈmiːθiːən/

Orbital characteristics
- Semi-major axis: 139378 km
- Eccentricity: 0.00223
- Orbital period (sidereal): 0.612990 d
- Inclination: 0.008°
- Satellite of: Saturn

Physical characteristics
- Dimensions: 137.0 × 81.0 × 56.2 km (± 1.0 × 2.8 × 0.8 km)
- Mean diameter: 85.6±1.4 km
- Volume: 327740±1710 km^{3}
- Mass: (1.59720±0.00072)×10^{17} kg (Note: Calculated from the standard gravitational parameter GM = (1.06602±0.00048)×10^{−2} km^{3}·s^{–2} given by Lainey et al. (2023), divided by the gravitational constant G = 6.6743×10^{−2} km^{3}·kg^{–1}·s^{–2}.)
- Mean density: 0.4873±0.0026 g/cm^{3}
- Surface gravity: 0.0007–0.0056 m/s^{2}
- Escape velocity: 0.018 km/s at longest axis to 0.028 km/s at poles
- Synodic rotation period: synchronous
- Axial tilt: assumed zero
- Albedo: 1.05±0.11 (geometric)
- Temperature: ≈ 74 K

Prometheus /prəˈmiːθiːəs/ is an inner satellite of Saturn. It was discovered on 24 October 1980 from images taken by the Voyager 1 probe, and was provisionally designated S/1980 S 27. In late 1985 it was officially named after Prometheus, a Titan in Greek mythology. It is also designated Saturn XVI.

Prometheus is extremely elongated, measuring approximately 137 km × 81 km × 56 km (85 mi × 50 mi × 35 mi). The surface is heavily cratered, giving it a similar appearance to nearby Epimetheus and Janus. It has several ridges and valleys and a number of impact craters of about 20 km (12 mi) diameter are visible. From its very low density and relatively high albedo, it is likely that Prometheus is a very porous icy body.

== Interactions with F Ring and other moons ==
Prometheus is a shepherd satellite for the inner edge of Saturn's narrow F Ring. Pandora orbits just outside the F Ring, and has traditionally been viewed as an outer shepherd of the ring; however, recent studies indicate that only Prometheus contributes to the confinement of the ring.

Images from the Cassini probe show that Prometheus's gravitational influence creates kinks and knots in the F Ring as it shepherds material from it. The orbit of Prometheus appears to be chaotic, due to a series of four 121:118 mean-motion resonances with Pandora. The most appreciable changes in their orbits occur approximately every 6.2 years, when the periapsis of Pandora lines up with the apoapsis of Prometheus, as they approach to within approximately 1400 km. Prometheus is itself a significant perturber of Atlas, with which it is in a 53:54 mean-longitude resonance.

Prometheus also participates in a 17:15 mean-motion resonance with Epimetheus, but only while it is on the outer orbit relative to Janus. No such configuration with Janus exists.

Due to their gravitational interactions with the rings, Prometheus and Pandora are expected to crash into each other or Mimas in the next 20 million years.

== Physical characteristics ==
The surface of Prometheus can be distinguished into two types of terrain, both equally cratered and separated from each other by long scarps, one of which could be indicative of an exposed core section. This core section would make up roughly two-thirds of the total volume of Prometheus.

Prometheus' elongated shape could be a result of the low-speed merging of several similar-sized bodies.

== Gallery ==
=== Selected images ===
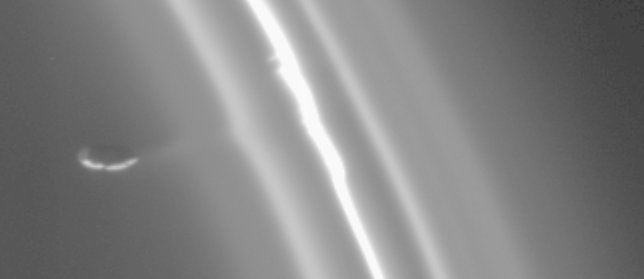
Prometheus pulling material from the F Ring

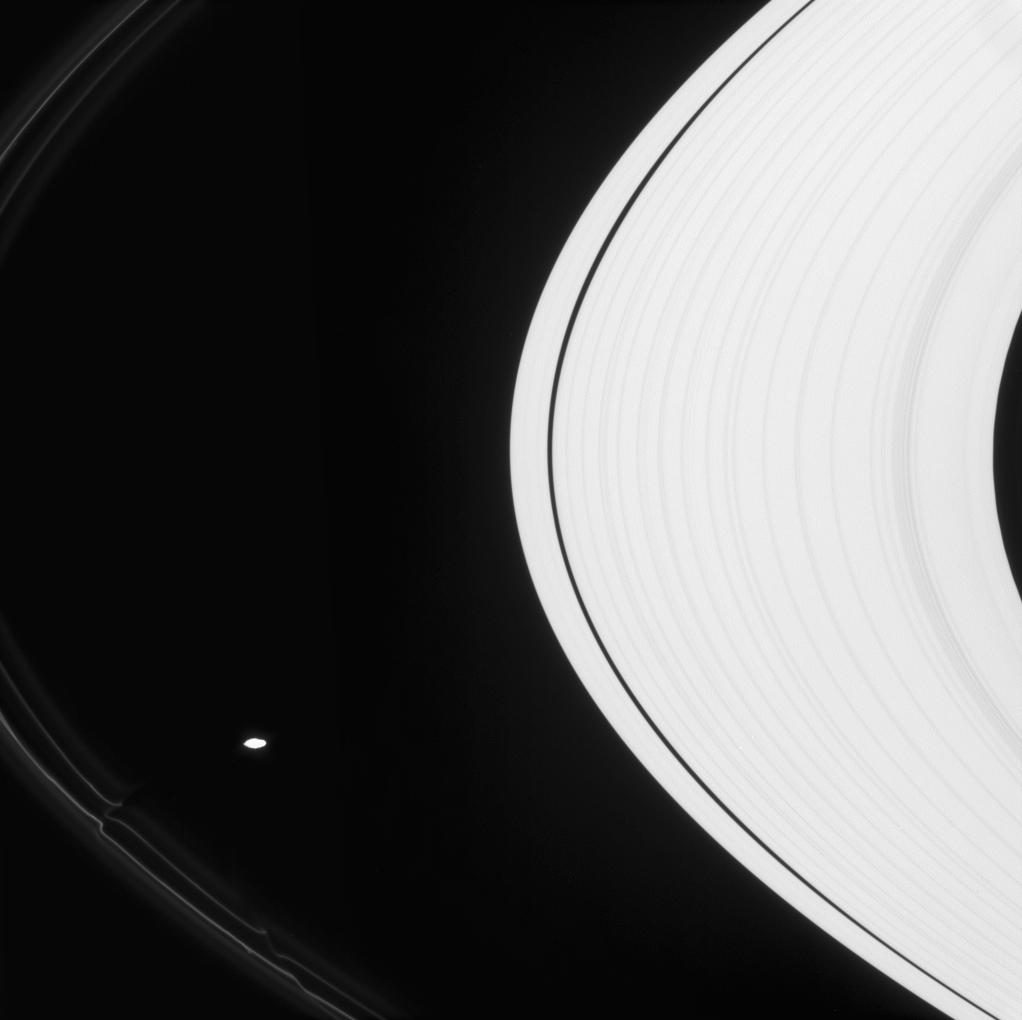
Prometheus tugging kinks into the F Ring

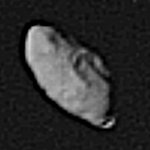
Voyager 2 (August 25, 1981) image

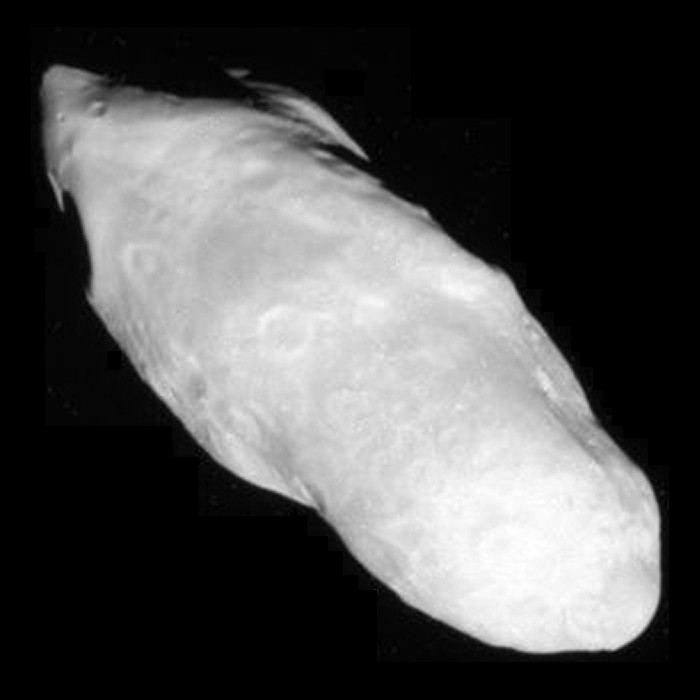
Cassini image (with moon's Saturn-facing end at lower right) reveals a surface covered with a blanket of fine material.

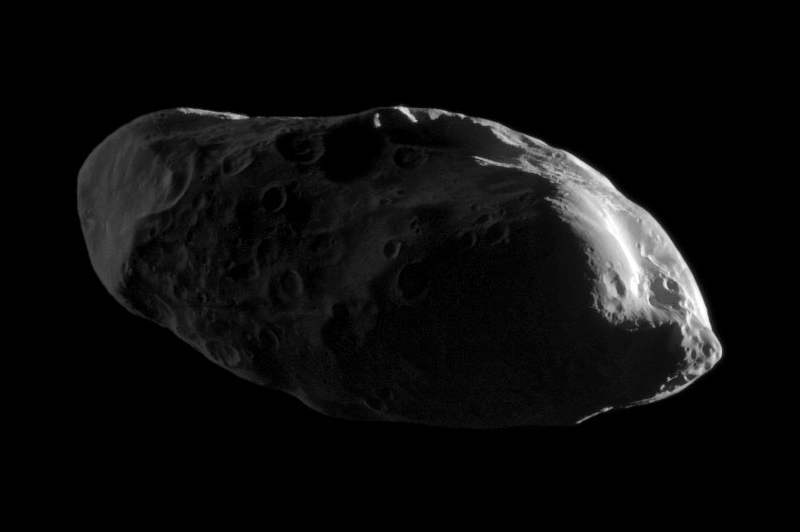
Image from January 27, 2010. Saturnshine illuminates the moon's night side.

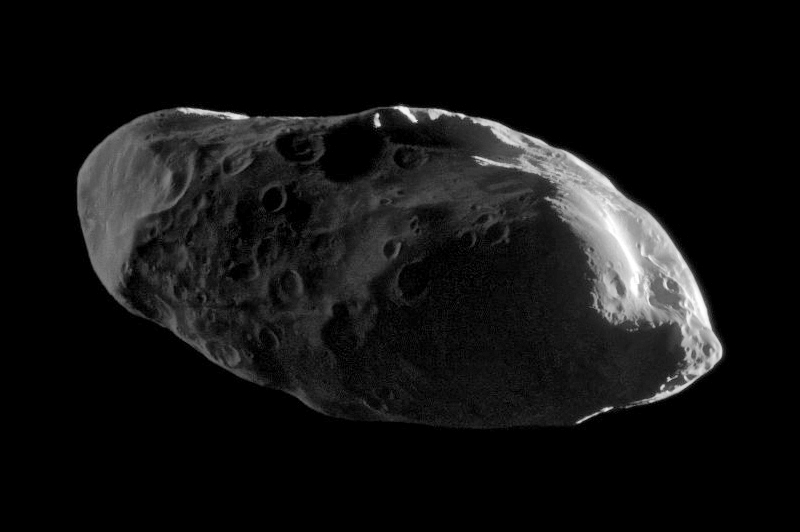
Brightened version of same image

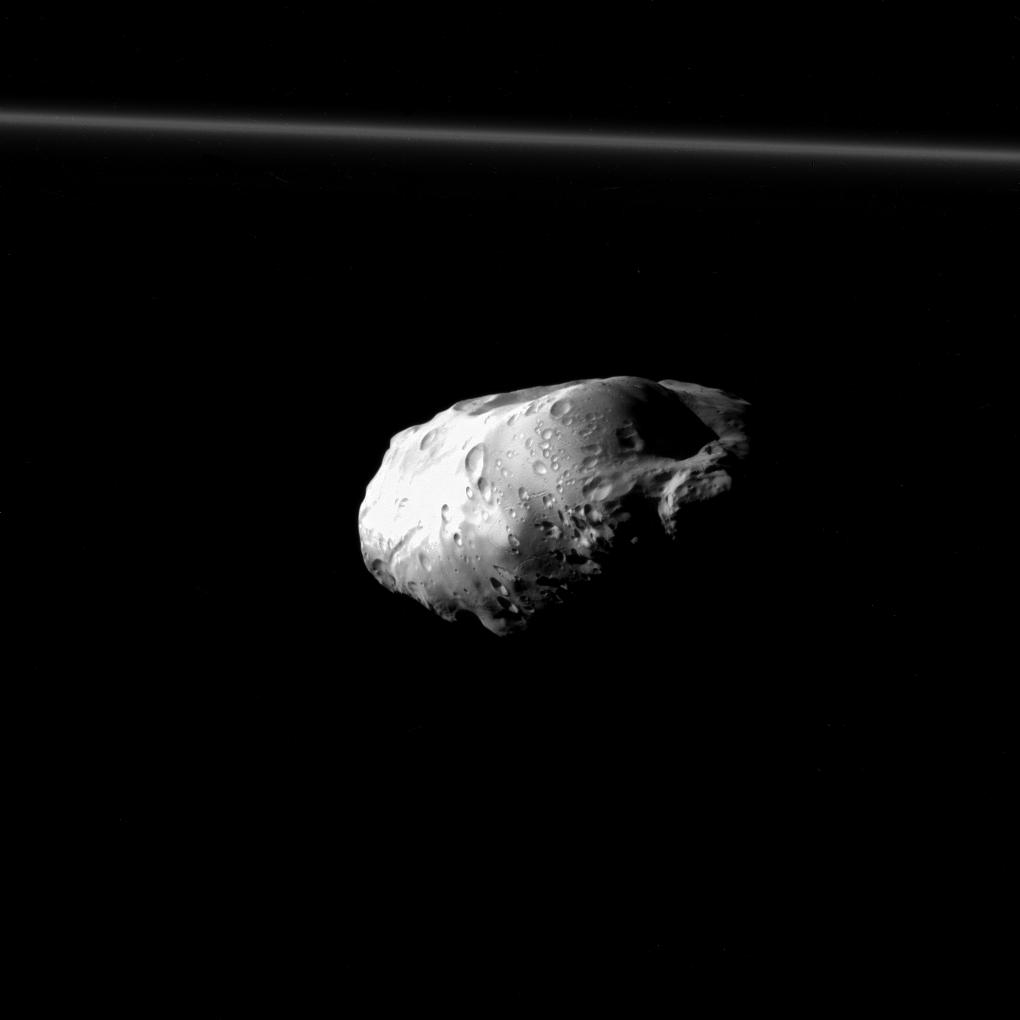
Prometheus flyby
(December 6, 2015)

=== Animations ===
Prometheus collides with the F ring, pulls a streamer, and leaves behind a dark channel. 12 seconds 107 kbit/s

Movie of Prometheus and the F Ring looped once. 5 seconds 48 kbit/s
