= Rings of Saturn =

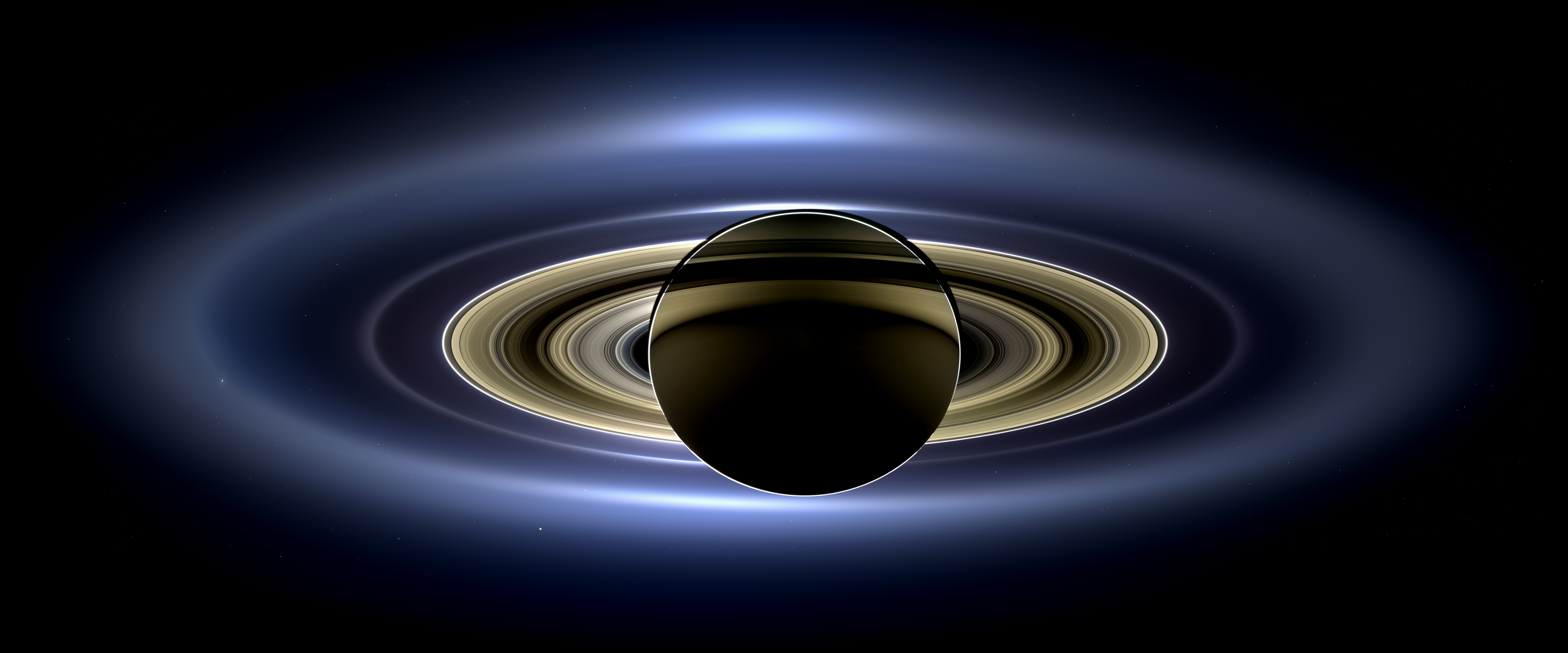
The full set of rings, imaged on 19 July 2013, as Saturn eclipses the Sun from the vantage of the Cassini orbiter, which is 1.2 million kilometres (0.75 million miles) from Saturn. Earth appears as a dot at 5 o'clock, between the G and E rings – with its brightness artificially exaggerated in this photograph.

Saturn has the most extensive and complex ring system of any planet in the Solar System. The rings consist of particles in orbit around the planet, ranging from micrometers to meters in size, and are made almost entirely of water ice, with a trace component of rocky material.

Though light reflected from the rings increases Saturn's apparent brightness, they are not themselves visible from Earth with the naked eye. In 1610, the year after his first observations with a telescope, Galileo Galilei became the first person to observe Saturn's rings, though he could not see them well enough to discern their true nature. In 1655, Christiaan Huygens was the first person to describe them as a disk surrounding Saturn. The concept that Saturn's rings are made up of a series of tiny ringlets can be traced to Pierre-Simon Laplace.

The rings have numerous gaps where particle density drops sharply. Two of these are cleared by moons embedded within them, and many others are at locations of known destabilizing orbital resonances with the moons of Saturn. Other gaps remain unexplained. Stabilizing resonances, on the other hand, are responsible for the longevity of several rings, such as the Titan Ringlet and the G Ring. Well beyond the main rings is the Phoebe ring, which is believed to originate from Phoebe and thus shares its retrograde orbital motion. It is aligned with the plane of Saturn's orbit. Saturn has an axial tilt of 27 degrees, so this ring is tilted at an angle of 27 degrees to the more visible rings orbiting above Saturn's equator.

There is no consensus as to when the rings formed: while investigations using theoretical models suggested they formed early in the Solar System's existence, newer data from Cassini suggests a more recent date of formation.

== History ==
=== Early observations ===
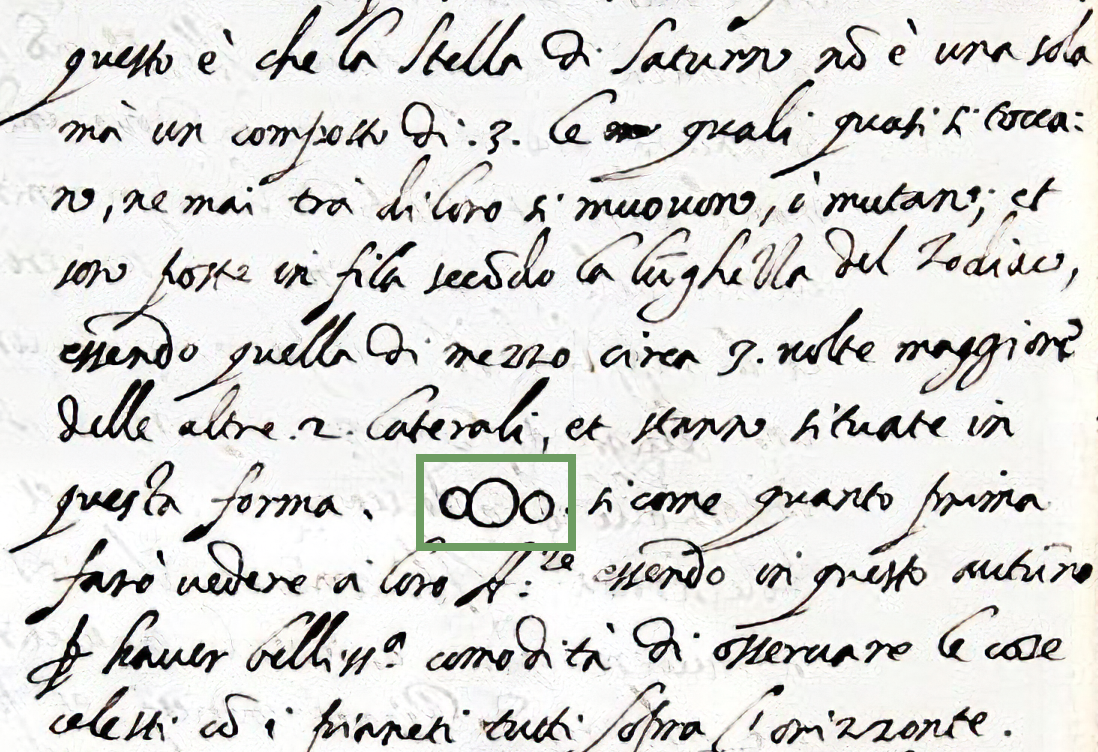
Detail of Galileo's drawing of Saturn in a letter to Belisario Vinta (1610)

Galileo Galilei was the first to observe the rings of Saturn in 1610 using his telescope, but was unable to identify them as such. He wrote to the Duke of Tuscany that "The planet Saturn is not alone, but is composed of three, which almost touch one another and never move nor change with respect to one another. They are arranged in a line parallel to the zodiac, and the middle one (Saturn itself) is about three times the size of the lateral ones." He also described the rings as Saturn's "ears". In 1612 the Earth passed through the plane of the rings and they became invisible. Mystified, Galileo remarked "I do not know what to say in a case so surprising, so unlooked for and so novel." He mused, "Has Saturn swallowed his children?" — referring to the myth of the Titan Saturn devouring his offspring to forestall the prophecy of them overthrowing him. He was further confused when the rings again became visible in 1613.

Early astronomers used anagrams as a form of commitment scheme to lay claim to new discoveries before their results were ready for publication. Galileo used the anagram "smaismrmilmepoetaleumibunenugttauiras" for Altissimum planetam tergeminum observavi ("I have observed the most distant planet to have a triple form") for discovering the rings of Saturn.

In 1657 Christopher Wren became Professor of Astronomy at Gresham College, London. He had been making observations of the planet Saturn from around 1652 with the aim of explaining its appearance. His hypothesis was written up in De corpore saturni, in which he came close to suggesting the planet had a ring. However, Wren was unsure whether the ring was independent of the planet, or physically attached to it. Before Wren's hypothesis was published Christiaan Huygens presented his hypothesis of the rings of Saturn. Immediately Wren recognised this as a better hypothesis than his own and De corpore saturni was never published. Robert Hooke was another early observer of the rings of Saturn, and noted the casting of shadows on the rings.

=== Huygens' ring hypothesis and later developments ===
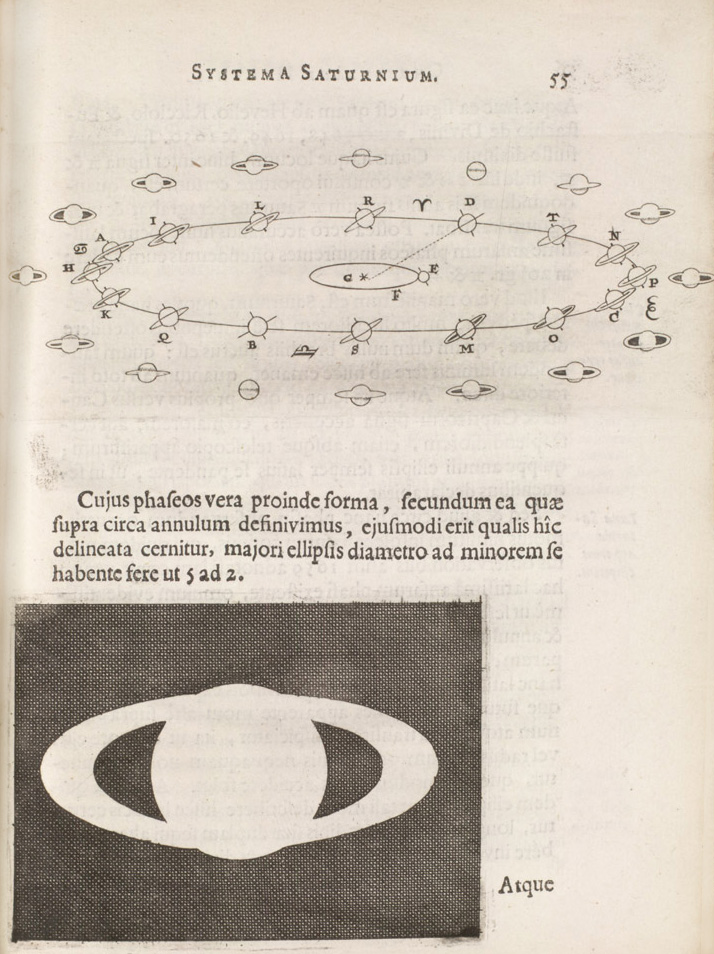
Huygens' ring hypothesis in Systema Saturnium (1659)

Christiaan Huygens began grinding lenses with his father Constantijn Huygens in 1655 and was able to observe Saturn with greater detail using a 43× power refracting telescope that he designed himself. He was the first to suggest that Saturn was surrounded by a ring detached from the planet, and published his findings in obfuscated form as the letter string "aaaaaaacccccdeeeeeghiiiiiiillllmmnnnnnnnnnooooppqrrstttttuuuuu". Three years later, he revealed that the letters were those of the sentence Annulo cingitur, tenui, plano, nusquam coherente, ad eclipticam inclinato ("[Saturn] is surrounded by a thin, flat, ring, nowhere touching [the body of the planet], inclined to the ecliptic"). He published his ring hypothesis in Systema Saturnium (1659) which also included his discovery of Saturn's moon, Titan, as well as the first clear outline of the dimensions of the Solar System.

In 1675, Giovanni Domenico Cassini determined that Saturn's ring was composed of multiple smaller rings with gaps between them; the largest of these gaps was later named the Cassini Division. This division is a 4,800-kilometre-wide (3,000 mi) region between the A Ring and B Ring.

In 1787, Pierre-Simon Laplace proved that a uniform solid ring would be unstable and suggested that the rings were composed of a large number of solid ringlets.

In 1859, James Clerk Maxwell demonstrated that a nonuniform solid ring, solid ringlets or a continuous fluid ring would also not be stable, indicating that the ring must be composed of numerous small particles, all independently orbiting Saturn. Later, Sofia Kovalevskaya also found that Saturn's rings cannot be liquid ring-shaped bodies. Spectroscopic studies of the rings which were carried out independently in 1895 by James Keeler of the Allegheny Observatory and by Aristarkh Belopolsky of the Pulkovo Observatory showed that Maxwell's analysis was correct.

Four robotic spacecraft have observed Saturn's rings from the vicinity of the planet. Pioneer 11's closest approach to Saturn occurred in September 1979 at a distance of 20,900 km (13,000 mi). Pioneer 11 was responsible for the discovery of the F ring. Voyager 1's closest approach occurred in November 1980 at a distance of 64,200 km (39,900 mi). A failed photopolarimeter prevented Voyager 1 from observing Saturn's rings at the planned resolution; nevertheless, images from the spacecraft provided unprecedented detail of the ring system and revealed the existence of the G ring. Voyager 2's closest approach occurred in August 1981 at a distance of 41,000 km (25,000 mi). Voyager 2's working photopolarimeter allowed it to observe the ring system at higher resolution than Voyager 1, and to thereby discover many previously unseen ringlets. The Cassini spacecraft entered into orbit around Saturn in July 2004. Cassini's images of the rings are the most detailed to date, and are responsible for the discovery of yet more ringlets.

The rings are named alphabetically in the order they were discovered: A and B in 1675 by Giovanni Domenico Cassini, C in 1850 by William Cranch Bond and his son George Phillips Bond, D in 1933 by Nikolai Barabashov and Boris Semeykin, E in 1967 by Walter A. Feibelman, F in 1979 by Pioneer 11, and G in 1980 by Voyager 1. The main rings are, working outward from the planet, C, B and A, with the Cassini Division, the largest gap, separating Rings B and A. Several fainter rings were discovered more recently. The D Ring is exceedingly faint and closest to the planet. The narrow F Ring is just outside the A Ring. Beyond that are two far fainter rings named G and E. The rings show a tremendous amount of structure on all scales, some related to perturbations by Saturn's moons, but much unexplained.

== Observation ==
Saturn's axial tilt is 26.7°, meaning that widely varying views of the rings, of which the visible ones occupy its equatorial plane, are obtained from Earth at different times. Earth makes passes through the ring plane every 13 to 15 years, about every half Saturn year, and there are about equal chances of either a single or three crossings occurring in each such occasion. The most recent ring plane crossings were on 22 May 1995, 10 August 1995, 11 February 1996, 4 September 2009 and 23 March 2025; upcoming events will occur on 15 October 2038, 1 April 2039 and 9 July 2039. Favorable ring plane crossing viewing opportunities (with Saturn not close to the Sun) only come during triple crossings.

Saturn's equinoxes, when the Sun passes through the ring plane, are not evenly spaced. The sun passes south to north through the ring plane when Saturn's heliocentric longitude is 173.6 degrees (e.g. 11 August 2009), about the time Saturn crosses from Leo to Virgo. 15.7 years later Saturn's longitude reaches 353.6 degrees and the sun passes to the south side of the ring plane. On each orbit the Sun is north of the ring plane for 15.7 Earth years, then south of the plane for 13.7 years. (Note: At 0.0565, Saturn's orbital eccentricity is the largest of the Solar System's giant planets, and over three times Earth's. Its aphelion is reached close to its northern hemisphere summer solstice.) Dates for north-to-south crossings include 19 November 1995 and 6 May 2025, with south-to-north crossings on 11 August 2009 and 23 January 2039. During the period around an equinox the illumination of most of the rings is greatly reduced, making possible unique observations highlighting features that depart from the ring plane.

Saturn shows complex patterns in its brightness. Most of the variability is due to the changing aspect of the rings, and this goes through two cycles every orbit. However, superimposed on this is variability due to the eccentricity of the planet's orbit that causes the planet to display brighter oppositions in the northern hemisphere than it does in the southern.

== General characteristics ==
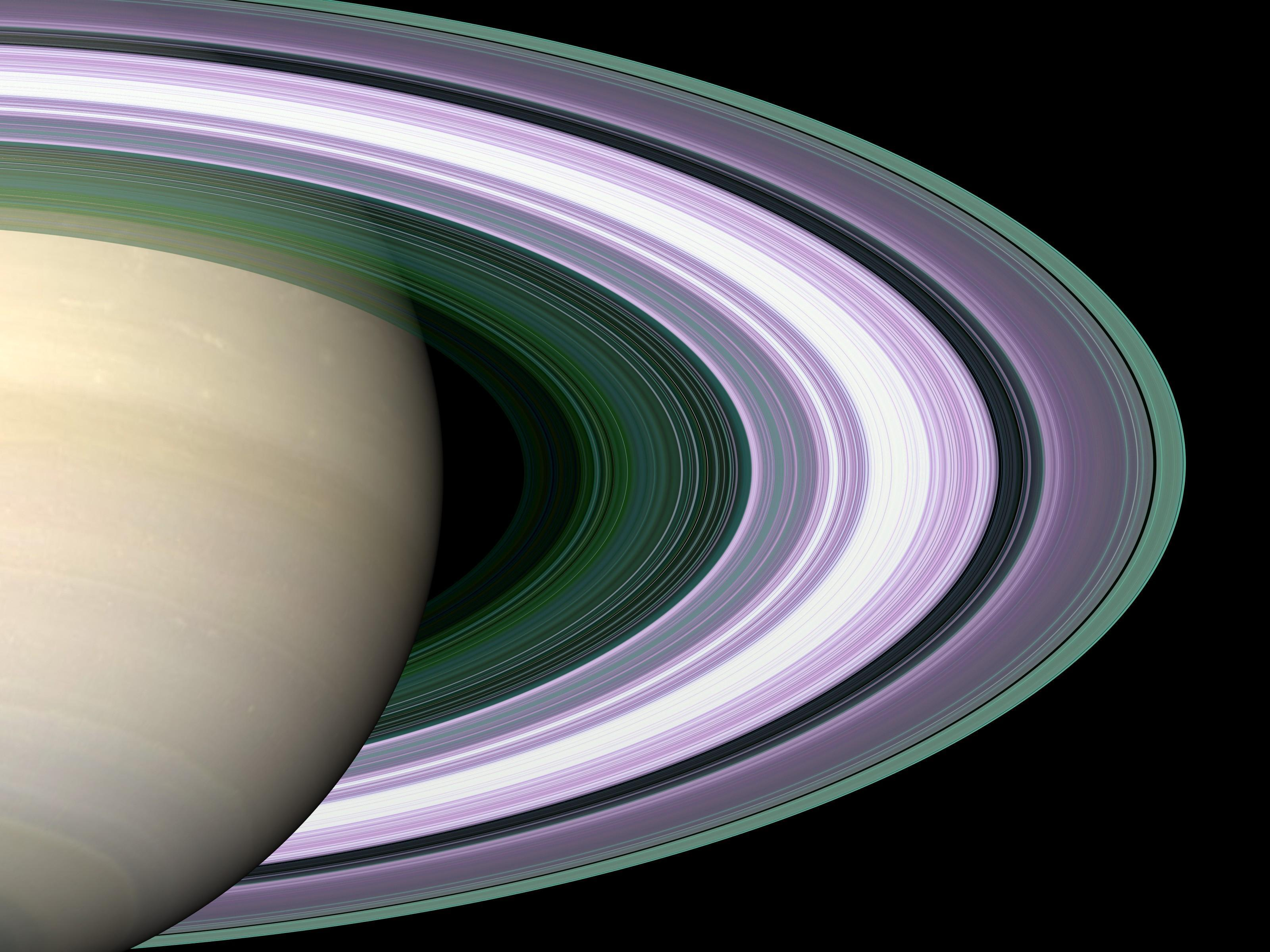
Simulated image using color to present radio-occultation-derived particle size data. The attenuation of 0.94-, 3.6-, and 13-cm signals sent by Cassini through the rings to Earth shows abundance of particles of sizes similar to or larger than those wavelengths. Purple (B, inner A Ring) means few particles are < 5 cm (all signals similarly attenuated). Green and blue (C, outer A Ring) mean particles < 5 cm and < 1 cm, respectively, are common. White areas (B Ring) are too dense to transmit adequate signal. Other evidence shows rings A to C have a broad range of particle sizes, up to m across.

The dense main rings extend from 7,000 km (4,300 mi) to 80,000 km (50,000 mi) away from Saturn's equator, whose radius is 60,300 km (37,500 mi) (see below). With an estimated local thickness of as little as 10 meters (32' 10") and as much as 1 km (1093 yards), they are composed of 99.9% pure water ice with a smattering of impurities that may include tholins or silicates. The main rings are primarily composed of particles smaller than 10 m.

Cassini directly measured the mass of the ring system via their gravitational effect during its final set of orbits that passed between the rings and the cloud tops, yielding a value of 1.54 (± 0.49) × 10^{19} kg, or 0.41 ± 0.13 Mimas masses. This is around two-thirds the mass of the Earth's entire Antarctic ice sheet, spread across a surface area 80 times larger than that of Earth. The estimate is close to the value of 0.40 Mimas masses derived from Cassini observations of density waves in the A, B and C rings. It is a small fraction of the total mass of Saturn (about 0.25 ppb). Earlier Voyager observations of density waves in the A and B rings and an optical depth profile had yielded a mass of about 0.75 Mimas masses, with later observations and computer modeling suggesting that was an underestimate.

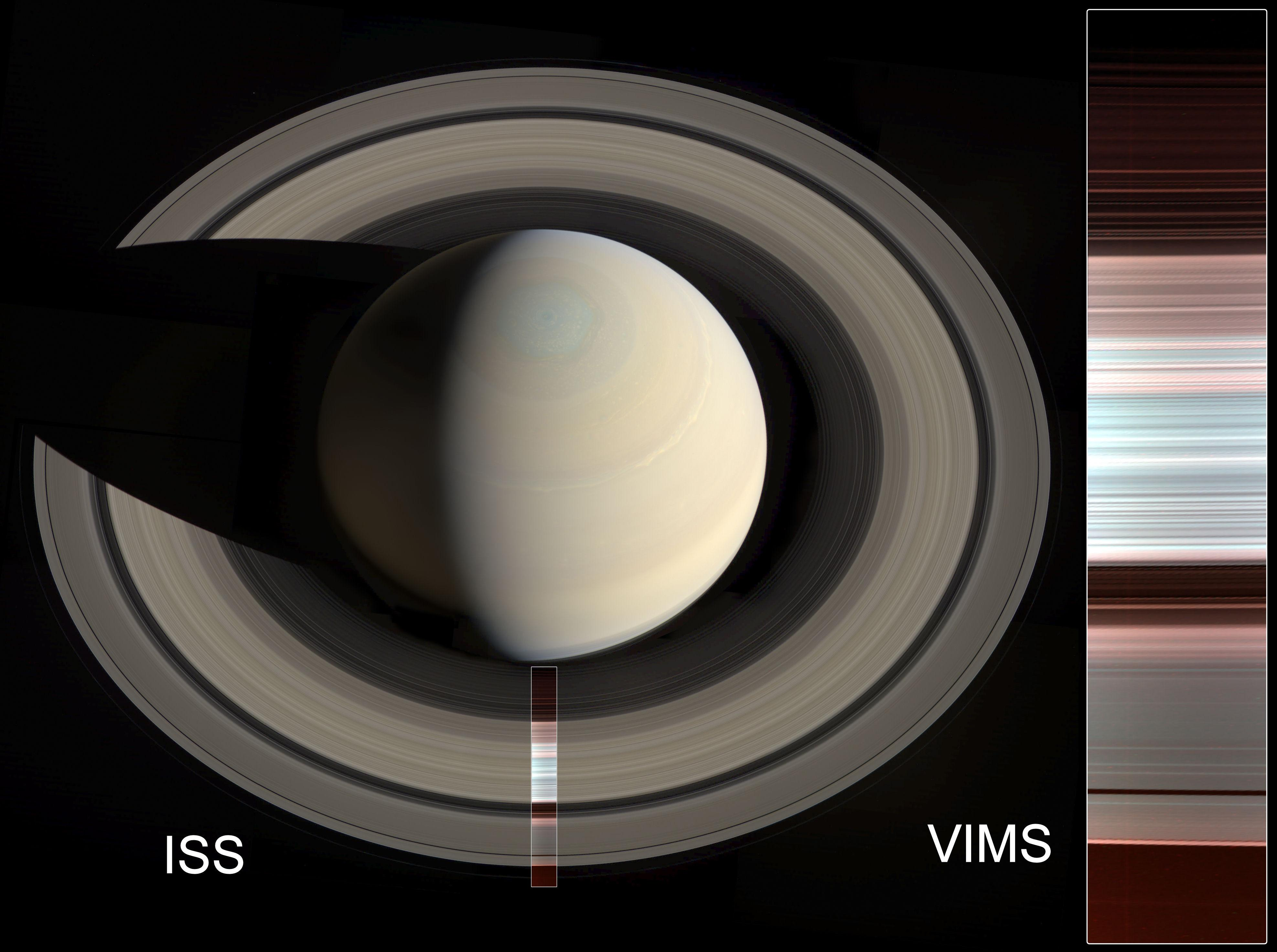
Saturn and its A, B and C rings in visible and (inset) infrared light. In the false-color IR view, greater water ice content and larger grain size lead to blue-green color, while greater non-ice content and smaller grain size yield a reddish hue.

Although the largest gaps in the rings, such as the Cassini Division and Encke Gap, can be seen from Earth, the Voyager spacecraft discovered that the rings have an intricate structure of thousands of thin gaps and ringlets. This structure is thought to arise, in several different ways, from the gravitational pull of Saturn's many moons. Some gaps are cleared out by the passage of tiny moonlets such as Pan, many more of which may yet be discovered, and some ringlets seem to be maintained by the gravitational effects of small shepherd satellites (similar to Prometheus and Pandora's maintenance of the F ring). Other gaps arise from resonances between the orbital period of particles in the gap and that of a more massive moon further out; Mimas maintains the Cassini Division in this manner. Still more structure in the rings consists of spiral waves raised by the inner moons' periodic gravitational perturbations at less disruptive resonances.

Data from the Cassini space probe indicate that the rings of Saturn possess their own atmosphere, independent of that of the planet itself. The atmosphere is composed of molecular oxygen gas (O_{2}) produced when ultraviolet light from the Sun interacts with water ice in the rings. Chemical reactions between water molecule fragments and further ultraviolet stimulation create and eject, among other things, O_{2}. According to models of this atmosphere, H_{2} is also present. The O_{2} and H_{2} atmospheres are so sparse that if the entire atmosphere were somehow condensed onto the rings, it would be about one atom thick. The rings also have a similarly sparse OH (hydroxide) atmosphere. Like the O_{2}, this atmosphere is produced by the disintegration of water molecules, though in this case the disintegration is done by energetic ions that bombard water molecules ejected by Saturn's moon Enceladus. This atmosphere, despite being extremely sparse, was detected from Earth by the Hubble Space Telescope.

In 1980, Voyager 1 made a fly-by of Saturn that showed the F ring to be composed of three narrow rings that appeared to be braided in a complex structure; it is now known that the outer two rings consist of knobs, kinks and lumps that give the illusion of braiding, with the less bright third ring lying inside them.

New images of the rings taken around the 11 August 2009 equinox of Saturn by NASA's Cassini spacecraft have shown that the rings extend significantly out of the nominal ring plane in a few places. This displacement reaches as much as 4 km (2.5 mi) at the border of the Keeler Gap, due to the out-of-plane orbit of Daphnis, the moon that creates the gap.

The Cassini UVIS team, led by Larry Esposito, used stellar occultation to discover 13 objects, ranging from 27 meters (89') to 10 km (6 miles) across, within the F ring. They are translucent, suggesting they are temporary aggregates of ice boulders a few meters across. Esposito believes this to be the basic structure of the Saturnian rings, particles clumping together, then being blasted apart.

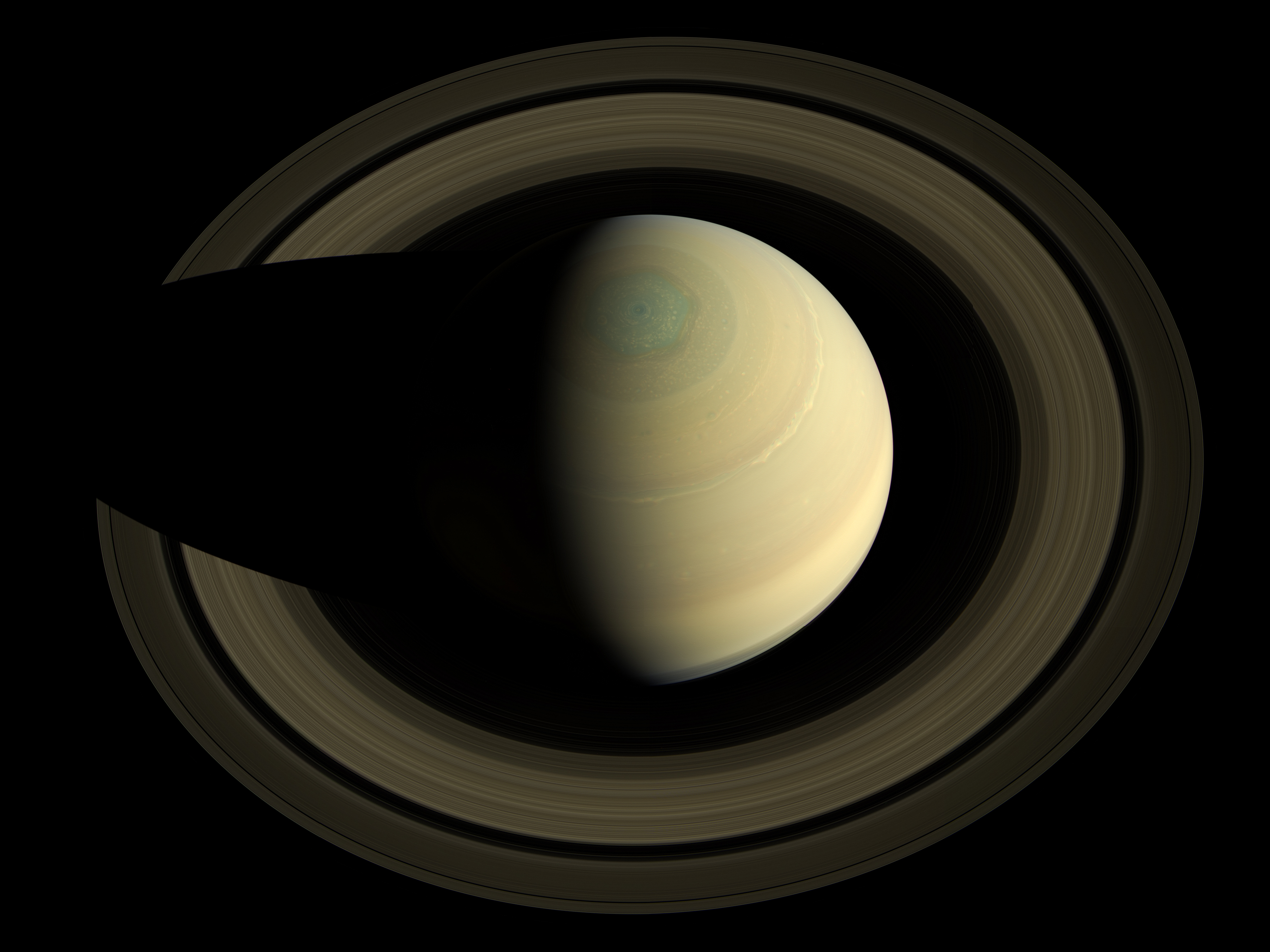
Cassini space probe view of the unilluminated side of Saturn's rings (October 10, 2013).

== Formation and evolution of main rings ==
Estimates of the age of Saturn's rings vary widely, depending on the approach used. They have been considered to possibly be very old, dating to the formation of Saturn itself. However, data from Cassini suggest they are much younger, having most likely formed within the last 100 million years, and may thus be between 10 million and 100 million years old. This recent origin scenario is based on a new, low mass estimate modeling of the rings' dynamical evolution, and measurements of the flux of interplanetary dust, which feed into an estimate of the rate of ring darkening over time. Since the rings are continually losing material, they would have been more massive in the past than at present. The mass estimate alone is not very diagnostic, since high mass rings that formed early in the Solar System's history would have evolved by now to a mass close to that measured. Based on current depletion rates, they may disappear in 300 million years.

The main hypotheses regarding the origin of Saturn's inner rings involve the rings being created from the debris of one or more moons. A hypothesis originally proposed by Édouard Roche in the 19th century is that the rings were once a moon of Saturn whose orbit decayed until it was close enough to be ripped apart by tidal forces (see Roche limit). Numerical simulations carried out in 2022 support this hypothesis; the authors of that study proposed the name "Chrysalis" for the destroyed moon. A variation on this hypothesis is that this moon disintegrated after being struck by a large comet or asteroid. In 2023, simulations showed that the collision of two icy moons would explain the scarcity of rock in Saturn's rings.

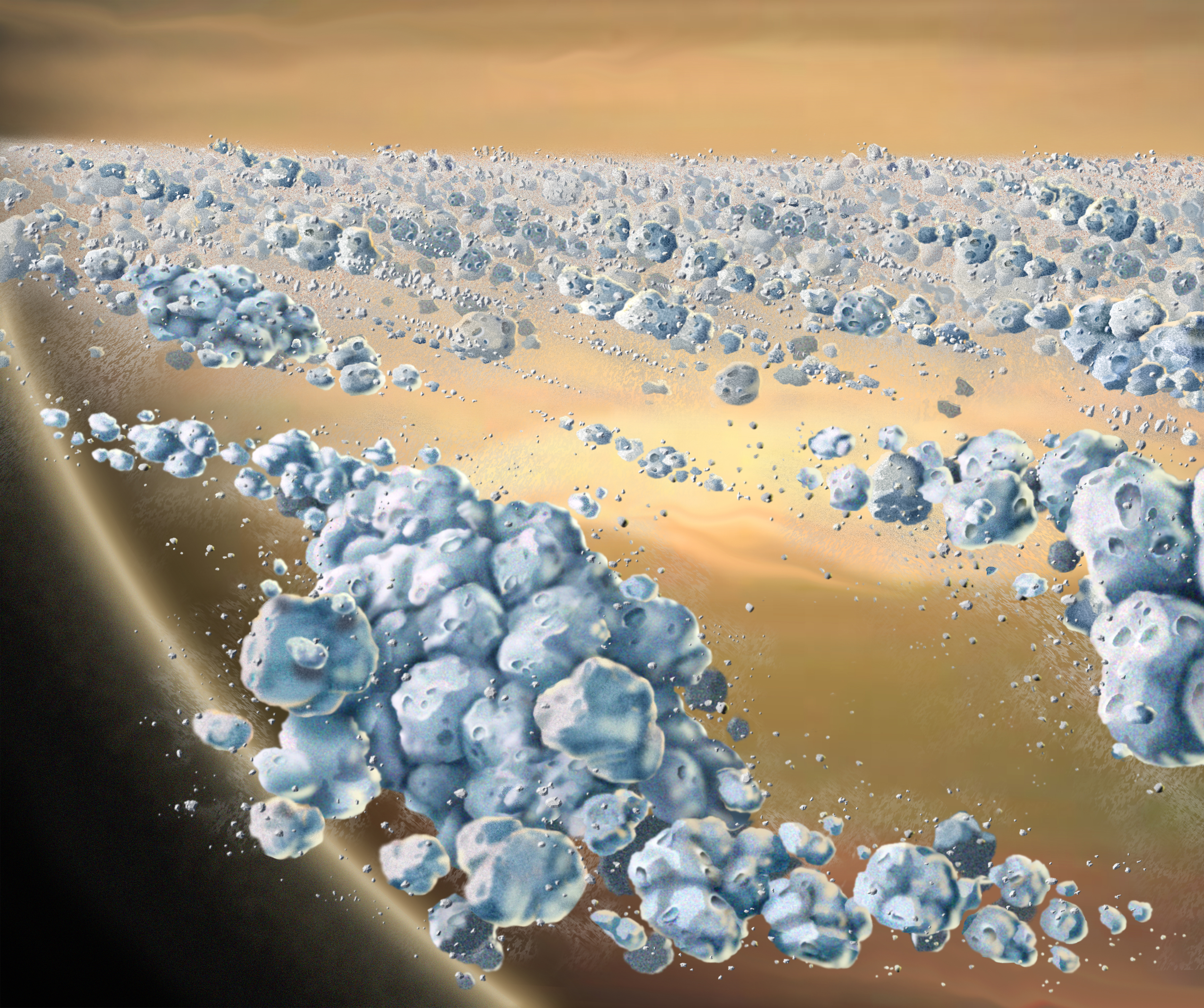
A 2007 artist's impression of the aggregates of icy particles that form the portions of Saturn's rings which appear solid from a distance. These elongated clumps are continually forming and dispersing. The largest particles are a few meters across.

Saturn's rings and moons

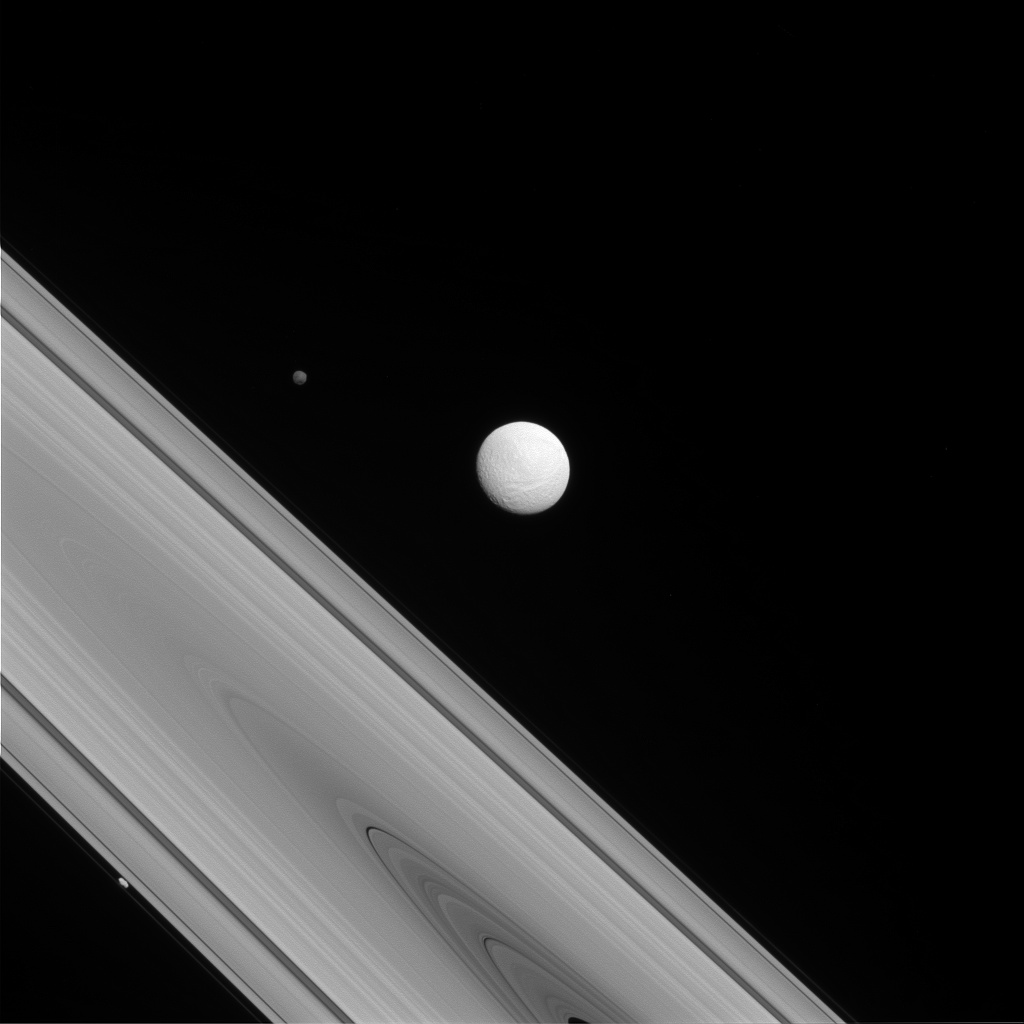
Tethys, Hyperion and Prometheus

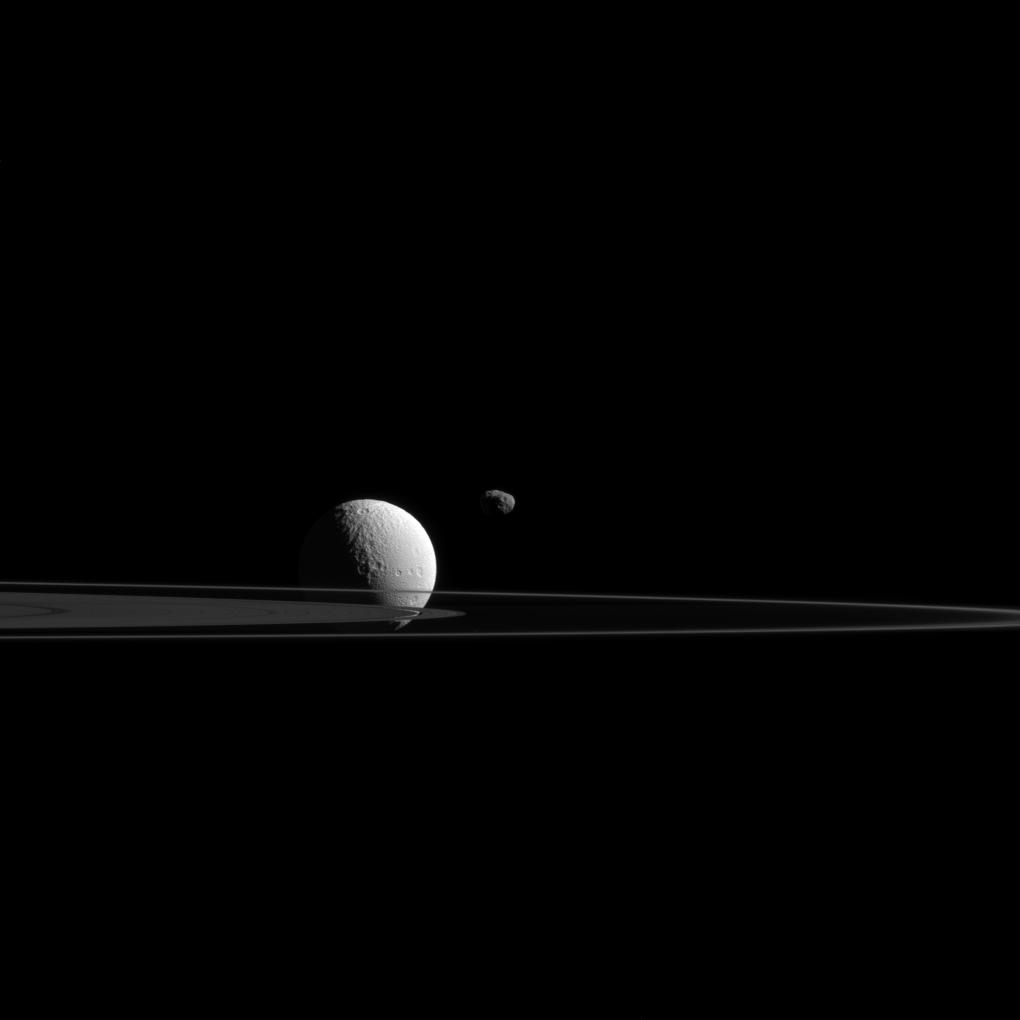
Tethys and Janus

A more traditional version of the disrupted-moon hypothesis is that the rings are composed of debris from a moon 400 to 600 km (200 to 400 miles) in diameter, slightly larger than Mimas. The last time there were collisions large enough to be likely to disrupt a moon that large was during the Late Heavy Bombardment some four billion years ago.

A more recent variant of this type of hypothesis by R. M. Canup is that the rings could represent part of the remains of the icy mantle of a much larger, Titan-sized, differentiated moon that was stripped of its outer layer as it spiraled into the planet during the formative period when Saturn was still surrounded by a gaseous nebula. This would explain the scarcity of rocky material within the rings. The rings would initially have been much more massive (≈1,000 times) and broader than at present; material in the outer portions of the rings would have coalesced into the innermost moons of Saturn (those closest to Saturn), out to Tethys, also explaining the lack of rocky material in the composition of most of these moons. Subsequent collisional or cryovolcanic evolution of Enceladus, which is another of these moons, might then have caused selective loss of ice from this moon, raising its density to its current value of 1.61 g/cm^{3}, compared to values of 1.15 for Mimas and 0.97 for Tethys.

The idea of massive early rings was subsequently extended to explain the formation of Saturn's moons out to Rhea. If the initial massive rings contained chunks of rocky material (>100 km; 60 miles across) as well as ice, these silicate bodies would have accreted more ice and been expelled from the rings, due to gravitational interactions with the rings and tidal interaction with Saturn, into progressively wider orbits. Within the Roche limit, bodies of rocky material are dense enough to accrete additional material, whereas less-dense bodies of ice are not. Once outside the rings, the newly formed moons could have continued to evolve through random mergers. This process may explain the variation in silicate content of Saturn's moons out to Rhea, as well as the trend towards less silicate content closer to Saturn. Rhea would then be the oldest of the moons formed from the primordial rings, with moons closer to Saturn being progressively younger.

The brightness and purity of the water ice in Saturn's rings have also been cited as evidence that the rings are much younger than Saturn, as the infall of meteoric dust would have led to a darkening of the rings. However, new research indicates that the B Ring may be massive enough to have diluted infalling material and thus avoided substantial darkening over the age of the Solar System. Ring material may be recycled as clumps from within the rings and are then disrupted by impacts. This would explain the apparent youth of some of the material within the rings. Evidence suggesting a recent origin of the C ring has been gathered by researchers analyzing data from the Cassini Titan Radar Mapper, which focused on analyzing the proportion of rocky silicates within this ring. If much of this material was contributed by a recently disrupted centaur or moon, the age of this ring could be on the order of 100 million years or less. On the other hand, if the material came primarily from micrometeoroid influx, the age would be closer to a billion years.

Research based on rates of infall into Saturn favors a younger ring system age of hundreds of millions of years. Ring material is continually spiraling down into Saturn; the faster this infall, the shorter the lifetime of the ring system. One mechanism involves gravity pulling electrically charged water ice grains down from the rings along planetary magnetic field lines, a process termed 'ring rain'. This flow rate was inferred to be 432–2870 kg/s using ground-based Keck telescope observations; as a consequence of this process alone, the rings will be gone in ~292+818
−124 million years. While traversing the gap between the rings and planet in September 2017, the Cassini spacecraft detected an equatorial flow of charge-neutral material from the rings to the planet of 4,800–44,000 kg/s. Assuming this influx rate is stable, adding it to the continuous "ring rain" process implies the rings may be gone in under 100 million years.

== Physical structure of the rings ==
The densest parts of the Saturnian ring system are the A and B Rings, which are separated by the Cassini Division (discovered in 1675 by Giovanni Domenico Cassini). Along with the C Ring, which was discovered in 1850 and is similar in character to the Cassini Division, these regions constitute the main rings. The main rings are denser and contain larger particles than the tenuous dusty rings. The latter include the D Ring, extending inward to Saturn's cloud tops, the G and E Rings and others beyond the main ring system. These diffuse rings are characterised as "dusty" because of the small size of their particles (often about a μm); their chemical composition is, like the main rings, almost entirely water ice. The narrow F Ring, just off the outer edge of the A Ring, is more difficult to categorize; parts of it are very dense, but it also contains a great deal of dust-size particles.

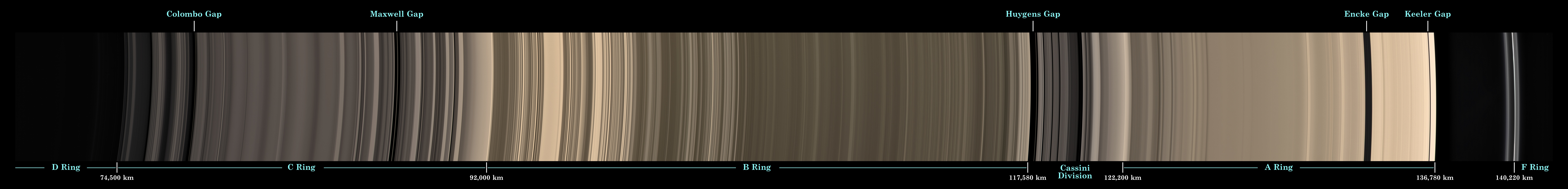
Natural-color mosaic of Cassini narrow-angle camera images of the unilluminated side of Saturn's D, C, B, A and F rings (left to right) taken on May 9, 2007 (distances are to the planet's center).
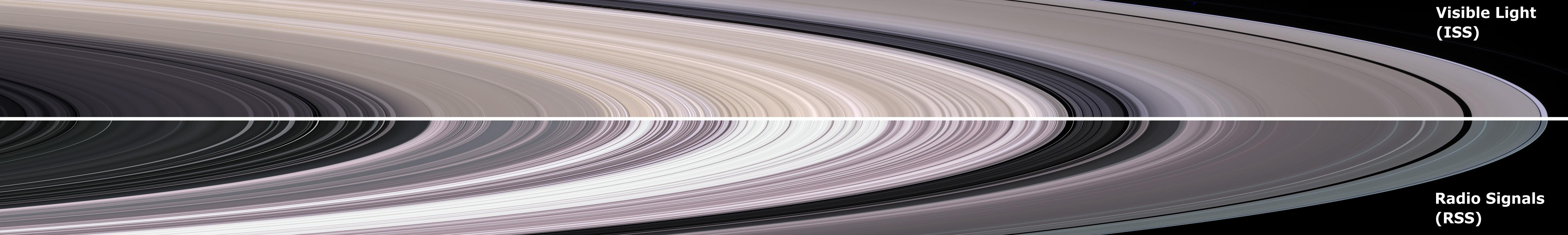
Oblique (4 degree angle) Cassini images of Saturn's C, B, and A rings (left to right; the F ring is faintly visible in the full size upper image if viewed at sufficient brightness). Upper image: natural color mosaic of Cassini narrow-angle camera photos of the illuminated side of the rings taken on December 12, 2004. Lower image: simulated view constructed from a radio occultation observation conducted on May 3, 2005. Color in the lower image is used to represent information about ring particle sizes (see the caption of the article's second image for an explanation).

=== Overall structure ===
Name (Note: Names as designated by the International Astronomical Union, unless otherwise noted. Broader separations between named rings are termed divisions, while narrower separations within named rings are called gaps.)	Distance from Saturn's center (km) (Note: Data mostly from the Gazetteer of Planetary Nomenclature, a NASA factsheet and several papers.)	Width (km)	Thickness (m)	Notes
D Ring	66,900 – 76,517	7,500	<30	Suspected by Pierre Geurin (1967), confirmed by Pioneer 11 (1979)
C Ring	74,658 – 92,000	17,500	5	Discovered by William and George Bond in 1850
B Ring	92,000 – 117,580	25,500	5–15	Discovered, along with the A ring, by Galileo Galilei in 1610. Ring structure revealed by Huygens in 1655
Cassini Division	117,580 – 122,170	4,700		Discovered by Giovanni Cassini in 1676
A Ring	122,170 – 136,775	14,600	10–30	Discovered, along with the B ring, by Galileo Galilei in 1610. Ring structure revealed by Huygens in 1655
Roche Division	136,775 – 139,380	2,600		Bordered by F Ring (Pioneer 11 discovery – 1979), named after the spacecraft then after Édouard Roche (2007)
F Ring	140,180 (Note: distance is to centre of gaps, rings and ringlets that are narrower than 1,000 km (600 miles))	30–500		Discovered by Pioneer 11 (1979)
Janus/Epimetheus Ring (Note: unofficial name)	149,000 – 154,000	5,000		Janus and Epimetheus
G Ring	166,000 – 175,000	9,000		First imaged by Voyager 1 (1980)
Methone Ring Arc	194,230	?		Methone
Anthe Ring Arc	197,665	?		Anthe
Pallene Ring	211,000 – 213,500	2,500		Pallene
E Ring	180,000 – 480,000	300,000	>2000 km	Observed in 1907 by Georges Fournier; confirmed by Walter Feibelman in 1980
Phoebe Ring	~4,000,000 – >13,000,000	9,900,000 –12,800,000	2,330,000 km	Composed of material ejected by impacts on the moon Phoebe; discovered in 2009 by Anne Verbiscer, Michael Skrutskie, and Douglas Hamilton

=== C Ring structures ===
Name	Distance from Saturn's center (km)	Width (km)	Named after
Colombo Gap	77,870	150	Giuseppe "Bepi" Colombo
Titan Ringlet	77,870	25	Titan, moon of Saturn
Maxwell Gap	87,491	270	James Clerk Maxwell
Maxwell Ringlet	87,491	64	James Clerk Maxwell
Bond Gap	88,700	30	William Cranch Bond and George Phillips Bond
1.470R_{S} Ringlet	88,716	16	its radius
1.495R_{S} Ringlet	90,171	62	its radius
Dawes Gap	90,210	20	William Rutter Dawes

=== Cassini Division structures ===
Name	Distance from Saturn's center (km)	Width (km)	Named after
Huygens Gap	117,680	285–400	Christiaan Huygens
Huygens Ringlet	117,848	~17	Christiaan Huygens
Herschel Gap	118,234	102	William Herschel
Russell Gap	118,614	33	Henry Norris Russell
Jeffreys Gap	118,950	38	Harold Jeffreys
Kuiper Gap	119,405	3	Gerard Kuiper
Laplace Gap	119,967	238	Pierre-Simon Laplace
Bessel Gap	120,241	10	Friedrich Bessel
Barnard Gap	120,312	13	Edward Emerson Barnard

=== A Ring structures ===
Name	Distance from Saturn's center (km)	Width (km)	Named after
Encke Gap	133,589	325	Johann Encke
Keeler Gap	136,505	35	James Keeler

== D Ring ==
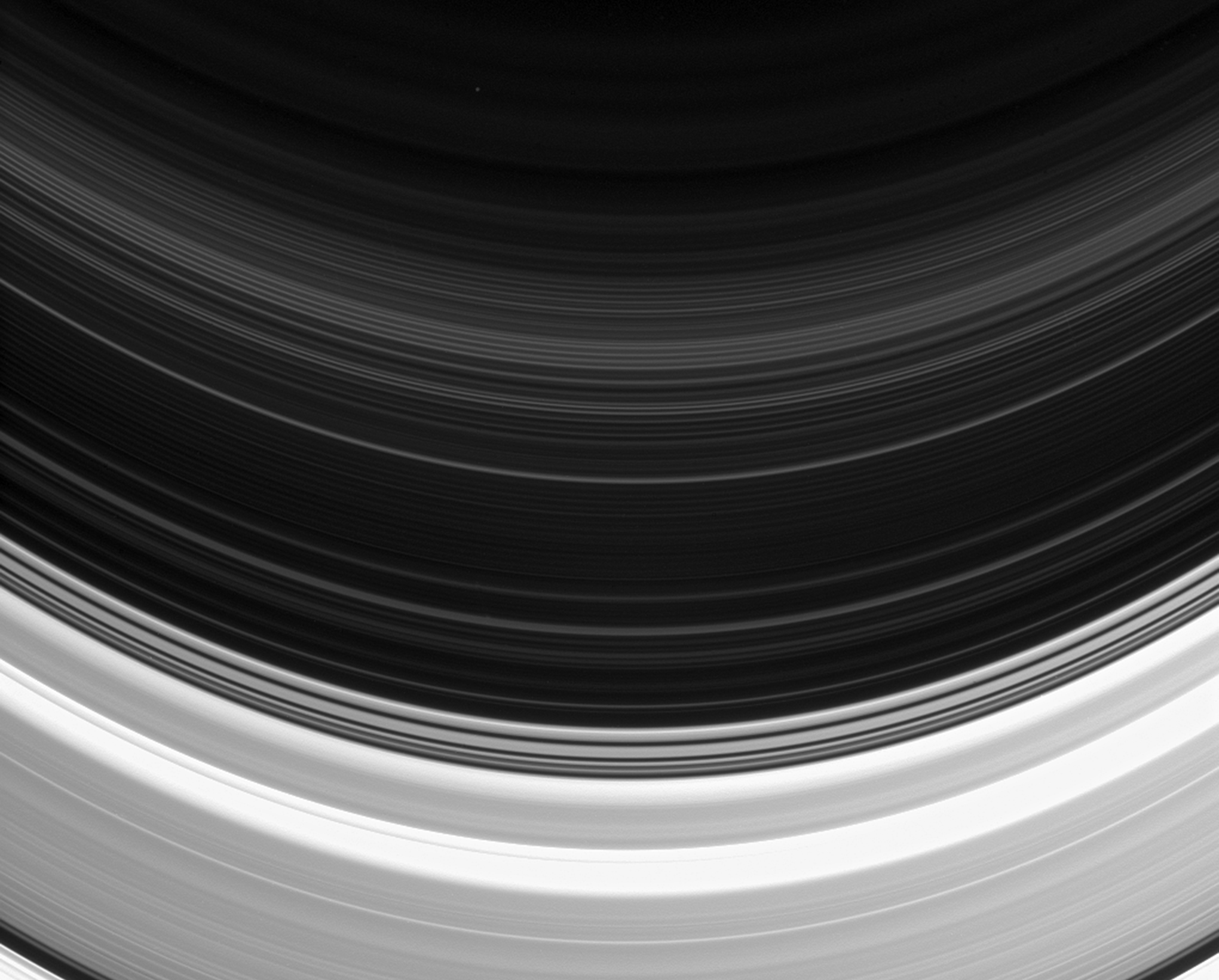
A Cassini image of the faint D Ring, with the inner C Ring below

The D Ring is the innermost ring, and is very faint. In 1980, Voyager 1 detected within this ring three ringlets designated D73, D72 and D68, with D68 being the discrete ringlet nearest to Saturn. Some 25 years later, Cassini images showed that D72 had become significantly broader and more diffuse, and had moved planetward by 200 km (100 miles).

Present in the D Ring is a finescale structure with waves 30 km (20 miles) apart. First seen in the gap between the C Ring and D73, the structure was found during Saturn's 2009 equinox to extend a radial distance of 19,000 km (12,000 miles) from the D Ring to the inner edge of the B Ring. The waves are interpreted as a spiral pattern of vertical corrugations of 2 to 20 m amplitude; the fact that the period of the waves is decreasing over time (from 60 km; 40 miles in 1995 to 30 km; 20 miles by 2006) allows a deduction that the pattern may have originated in late 1983 with the impact of a cloud of debris (with a mass of ≈10^{12} kg) from a disrupted comet that tilted the rings out of the equatorial plane. A similar spiral pattern in Jupiter's main ring has been attributed to a perturbation caused by impact of material from Comet Shoemaker–Levy 9 in 1994.

== C Ring ==
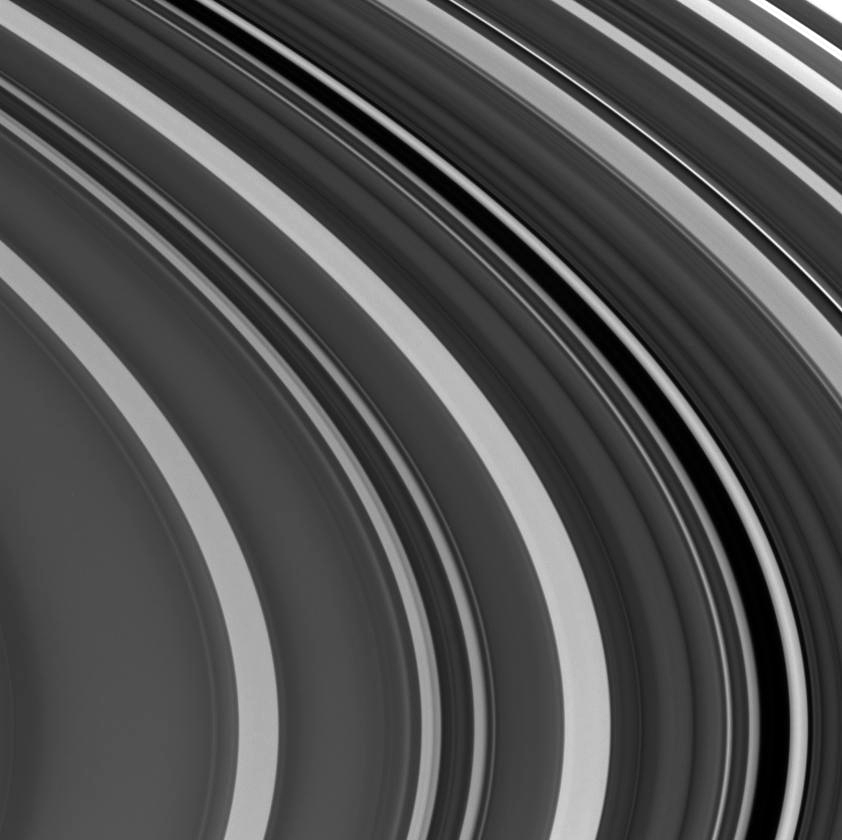
View of the outer C Ring; the Maxwell Gap with the Maxwell Ringlet on its right side are above and right of center. The Bond Gap is above a broad light band towards the upper right; the Dawes Gap is within a dark band just below the upper right corner.

The C Ring is a wide but faint ring located inward of the B Ring. It was discovered in 1850 by William and George Bond, though William R. Dawes and Johann Galle also saw it independently. William Lassell termed it the "Crepe Ring" because it seemed to be composed of darker material than the brighter A and B Rings.

Its vertical thickness is estimated at 5 meters (16'), its mass at around 1.1 × 10^{18} kg, and its optical depth varies from 0.05 to 0.12. That is, between 5 and 12 percent of light shining perpendicularly through the ring is blocked, so that when seen from above, the ring is close to transparent. The 30-km wavelength spiral corrugations first seen in the D Ring were observed during Saturn's equinox of 2009 to extend throughout the C Ring (see above).

=== Colombo Gap and Titan Ringlet ===
The Colombo Gap lies in the inner C Ring. Within the gap lies the bright but narrow Colombo Ringlet, centered at 77,883 km (48,394 miles) from Saturn's center, which is slightly elliptical rather than circular. This ringlet is also called the Titan Ringlet as it is governed by an orbital resonance with the moon Titan. At this location within the rings, the length of a ring particle's apsidal precession is equal to the length of Titan's orbital motion, so that the outer end of this eccentric ringlet always points towards Titan.

=== Maxwell Gap and Ringlet ===
The Maxwell Gap lies within the outer part of the C Ring. It also contains a dense non-circular ringlet, the Maxwell Ringlet. In many respects this ringlet is similar to the ε ring of Uranus. There are wave-like structures in the middle of both rings. While the wave in the ε ring is thought to be caused by Uranian moon Cordelia, no moon has been discovered in the Maxwell gap as of July 2008.

== B Ring ==
The B Ring is the largest, brightest, and most massive of the rings. Its thickness is estimated as 5 to 15 m and its optical depth varies from 0.4 to greater than 5, meaning that >99% of the light passing through some parts of the B Ring is blocked. The B Ring contains a great deal of variation in its density and brightness, nearly all of it unexplained. These are concentric, appearing as narrow ringlets, though the B Ring does not contain any gaps. In places, the outer edge of the B Ring contains vertical structures deviating up to 2.5 km (1½ miles) from the main ring plane, a significant deviation from the vertical thickness of the main A, B and C rings, which is generally only about 10 meters (about 30 feet). Vertical structures can be created by unseen embedded moonlets.

A 2016 study of spiral density waves using stellar occultations indicated that the B Ring's surface density is in the range of 40 to 140 g/cm^{2}, lower than previously believed, and that the ring's optical depth has little correlation with its mass density (a finding previously reported for the A and C rings). The total mass of the B Ring was estimated to be somewhere in the range of 7 to 24×10^{18} kg. This compares to a mass for Mimas of 37.5×10^{18} kg.

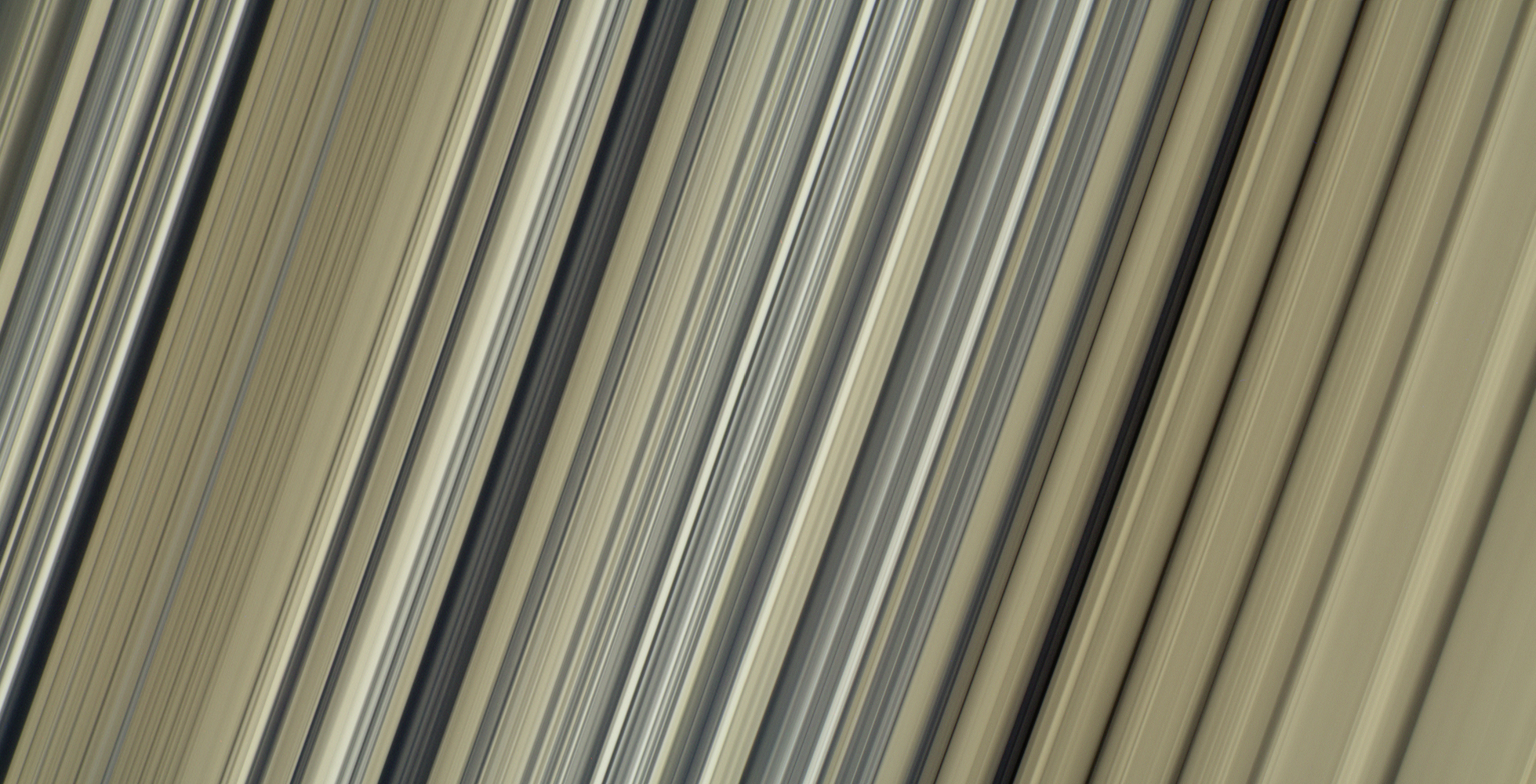
High resolution (about 3 km per pixel) color view of the inner-central B Ring (98,600 to 105,500 km; 61,300 to 65,600 miles from Saturn's center). The structures shown (from 40 km; 25 miles wide ringlets at center to 300–500 km; 200 to 300 miles wide bands at right) remain sharply defined at scales below the resolution of the image.

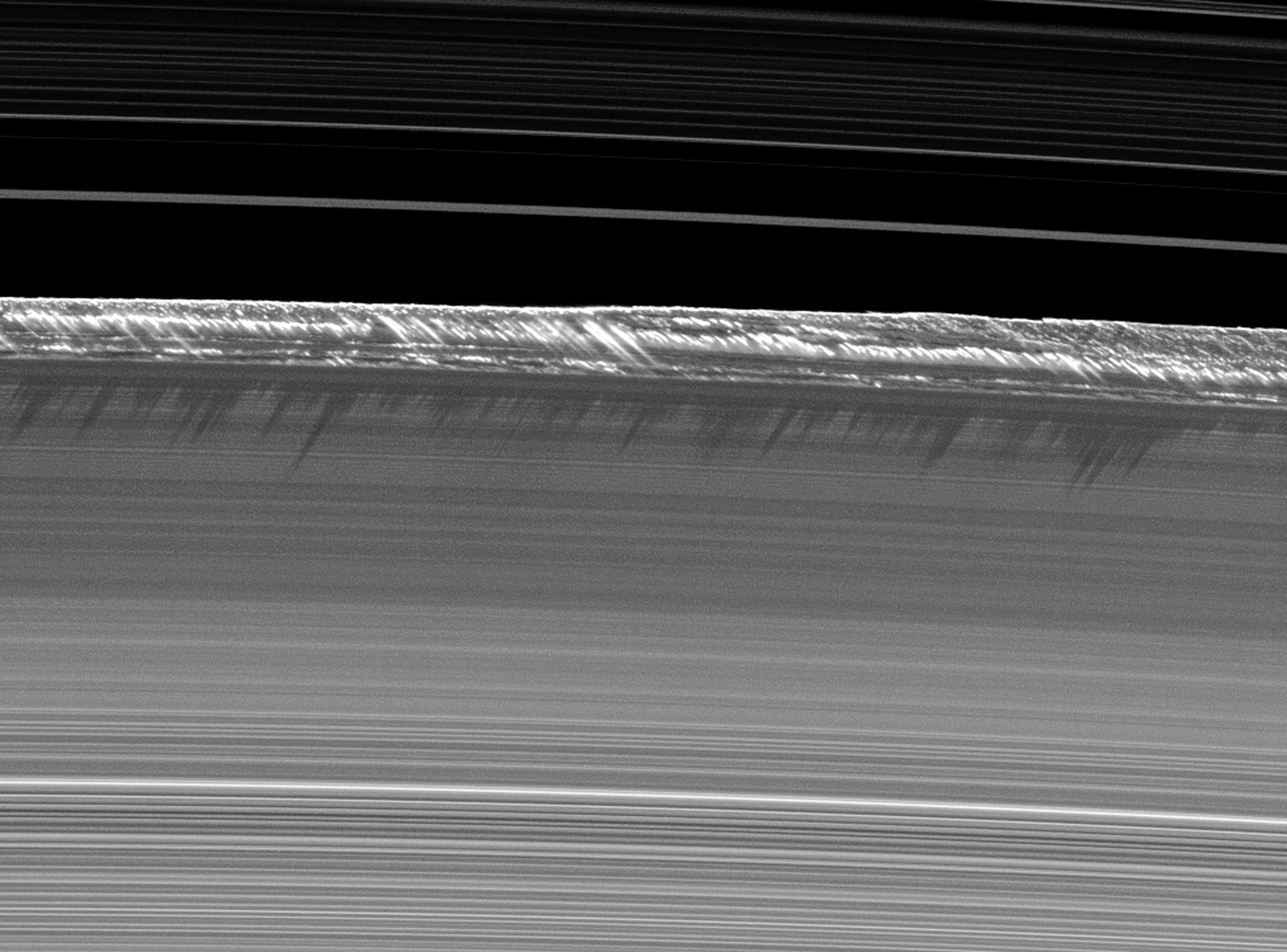
The B Ring's outer edge, viewed near equinox, where shadows are cast by vertical structures up to 2.5 km (1½ miles) high, probably created by unseen embedded moonlets. The Cassini Division is at top. (Note: The image was taken in visible light with the Cassini spacecraft narrow-angle camera on July 26, 2009. The view was acquired at a distance of approximately 336,000 kilometers (209,000 miles) from Saturn and at a sun-Saturn-spacecraft, or phase, angle of 132 degrees. Image scale is 2 kilometers (1 mile) per pixel.)

=== Spokes ===
Dark spokes mark the B ring's sunlit side in low phase angle Cassini images. This is a low-bitrate video. Lo-res version of this video

Until 1980, the structure of the rings of Saturn was explained as being caused exclusively by the action of gravitational forces. Then images from the Voyager spacecraft showed radial features in the B Ring, known as spokes, which could not be explained in this manner, as their persistence and rotation around the rings was not consistent with gravitational orbital mechanics. The spokes appear dark in backscattered light, and bright in forward-scattered light; the transition occurs at a phase angle near 60°. The leading hypothesis regarding the spokes' composition is that they consist of microscopic dust particles suspended away from the main ring by electrostatic repulsion, as they rotate almost synchronously with the magnetosphere of Saturn. The precise mechanism generating the spokes is still unknown. It has been suggested that the electrical disturbances might be caused by either lightning bolts in Saturn's atmosphere or micrometeoroid impacts on the rings. Alternatively, it is proposed that the spokes are very similar to a phenomenon known as lunar horizon glow or dust levitation, and caused by intense electric fields across the terminator of ring particles, not electrical disturbances.

The spokes were not observed again until some twenty-five years later, this time by the Cassini space probe. The spokes were not visible when Cassini arrived at Saturn in early 2004. Some scientists speculated that the spokes would not be visible again until 2007, based on models attempting to describe their formation. Nevertheless, the Cassini imaging team kept looking for spokes in images of the rings, and they were next seen in images taken on 5 September 2005.

The spokes appear to be a seasonal phenomenon, disappearing in the Saturnian midwinter and midsummer and reappearing as Saturn comes closer to equinox. Suggestions that the spokes may be a seasonal effect, varying with Saturn's 29.7-year orbit, were supported by their gradual reappearance in the later years of the Cassini mission.

=== Moonlets ===
In 2009, during equinox, a moonlet embedded in the B ring was discovered from the shadow it cast. It is estimated to be 400 m (1,300 ft) in diameter. The moonlet was given the provisional designation S/2009 S 1. Another moonlet in the B ring was also observed in 2009, though it was reported much later in June 2026. That moonlet is now designated S/2009 S 2.

== Cassini Division ==
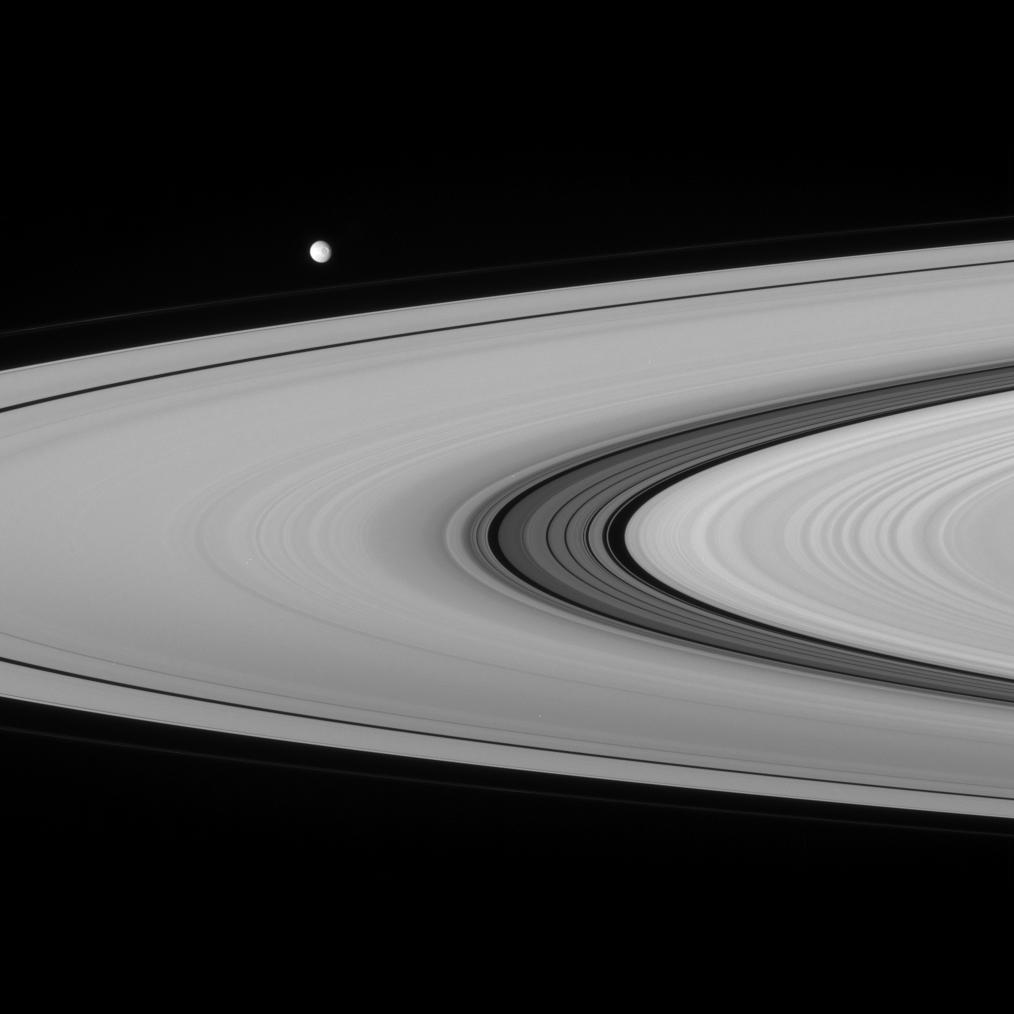
The Cassini Division imaged from the Cassini spacecraft. The Huygens Gap lies at its right border; the Laplace Gap is towards the center. A number of other, narrower gaps are also present. The moon in the background is Mimas.

The Cassini Division is a region 4,800 km (3,000 mi) in width between Saturn's A Ring and B Ring. It was discovered in 1675 by Giovanni Cassini at the Paris Observatory using a refracting telescope that had a 2.5-inch objective lens with a 20-foot-long focal length and a 90x magnification. From Earth it appears as a thin black gap in the rings. However, Voyager discovered that the gap is itself populated by ring material bearing much similarity to the C Ring. The division may appear bright in views of the unlit side of the rings, since the relatively low density of material allows more light to be transmitted through the thickness of the rings.

The inner edge of the Cassini Division is governed by a strong orbital resonance. Ring particles at this location orbit twice for every orbit of the moon Mimas. The resonance causes Mimas' pulls on these ring particles to accumulate, destabilizing their orbits and leading to a sharp cutoff in ring density. Many of the other gaps between ringlets within the Cassini Division, however, are unexplained.

=== Huygens Gap ===
Discovered in 1981 through images sent back by Voyager 2, the Huygens Gap is located at the inner edge of the Cassini Division. It contains the dense, eccentric Huygens Ringlet in the middle. This ringlet exhibits irregular azimuthal variations of geometrical width and optical depth, which may be caused by the nearby 2:1 resonance with Mimas and the influence of the eccentric outer edge of the B-ring. There is an additional narrow ringlet just outside the Huygens Ringlet.

== A Ring ==
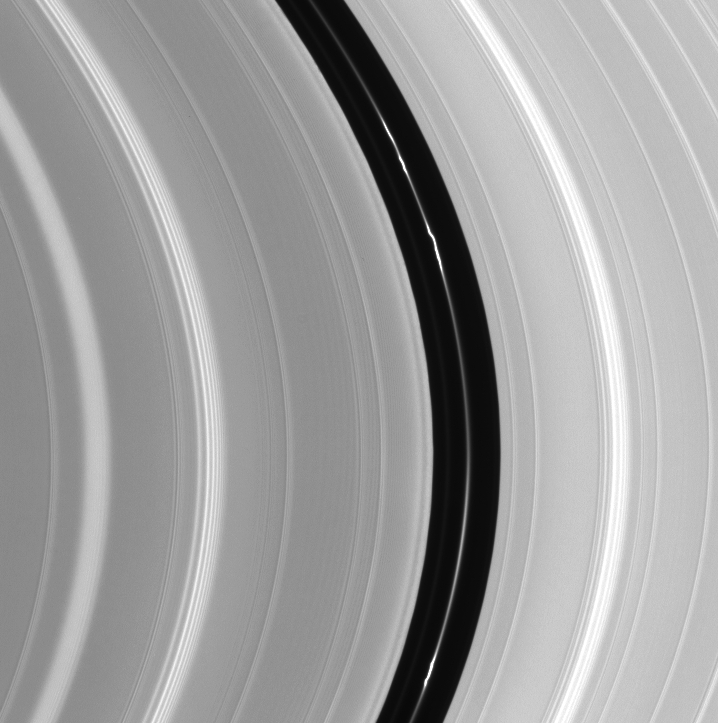
The central ringlet of the A Ring's Encke Gap coincides with Pan's orbit, implying its particles oscillate in horseshoe orbits.

The A Ring is the outermost of the large, bright rings. Its inner boundary is the Cassini Division and its sharp outer boundary is close to the orbit of the small moon Atlas. The A Ring is interrupted at a location 22% of the ring width from its outer edge by the Encke Gap. A narrower gap 2% of the ring width from the outer edge is called the Keeler Gap.

The thickness of the A Ring is estimated to be 10 to 30 m, its surface density from 35 to 40 g/cm^{2} and its total mass as 4 to 5×10^{18} kg (just under the mass of Hyperion). Its optical depth varies from 0.4 to 0.9.

Similarly to the B Ring, the A Ring's outer edge is maintained by orbital resonances, albeit in this case a more complicated set. It is primarily acted on by the 7:6 resonance with Janus and Epimetheus, with other contributions from the 5:3 resonance with Mimas and various resonances with Prometheus and Pandora. Other orbital resonances also excite many spiral density waves in the A Ring (and, to a lesser extent, other rings as well), which account for most of its structure. These waves are described by the same physics that describes the spiral arms of galaxies. Spiral bending waves, also present in the A Ring and also described by the same theory, are vertical corrugations in the ring rather than compression waves.

In April 2014, NASA scientists reported observing the possible formative stage of a new moon near the outer edge of the A Ring.

=== Encke Gap ===
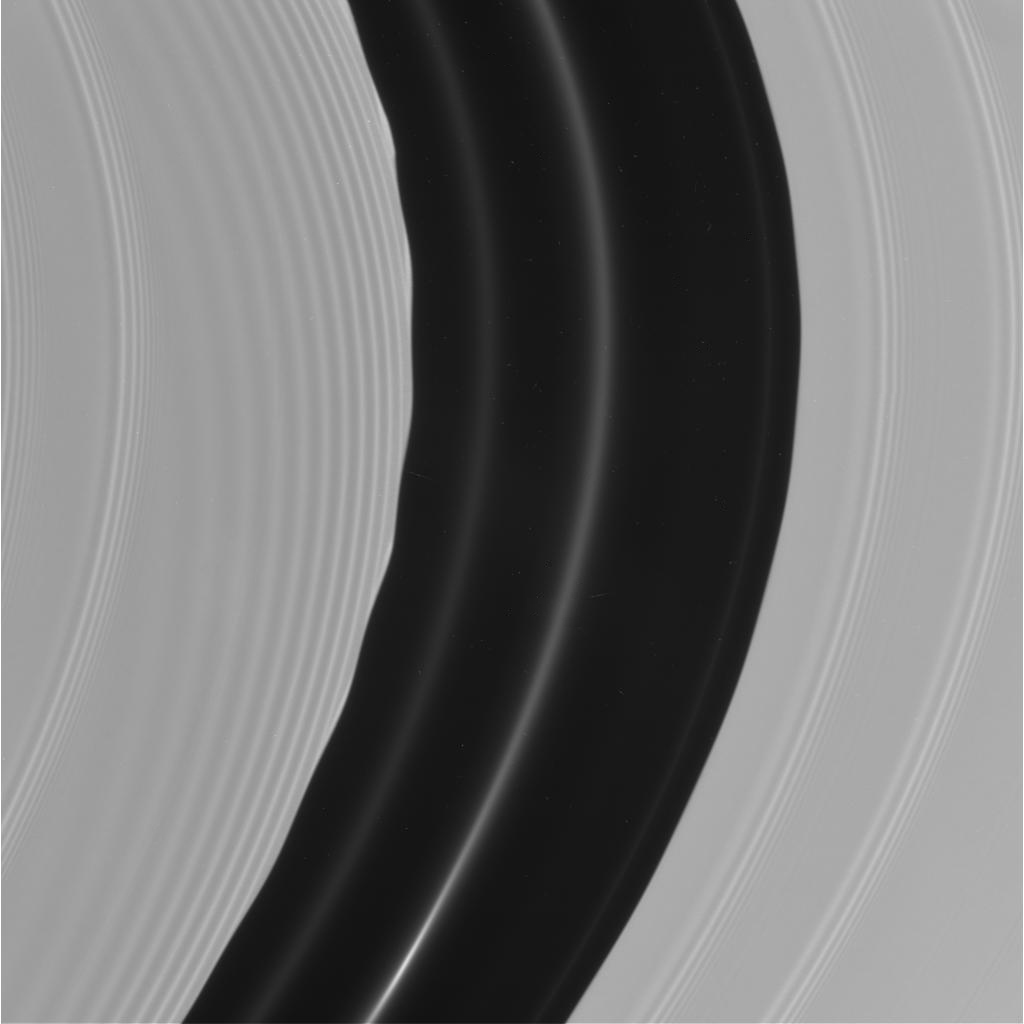
Pan's motion through the A ring's Encke Gap induces edge waves and (non-self-propagating) spiraling wakes ahead of and inward of it. The other more tightly wound bands are spiral density waves.

The Encke Gap is a 325-km (200 mile) wide gap within the A ring, centered at a distance of 133,590 km (83,000 miles) from Saturn's center. It is caused by the presence of the small moon Pan, which orbits within it. Images from the Cassini probe have shown that there are at least three thin, knotted ringlets within the gap. Spiral density waves visible on both sides of it are induced by resonances with nearby moons exterior to the rings, while Pan induces an additional set of spiralling wakes.

Johann Encke himself did not observe this gap; it was named in honour of his ring observations. The gap itself was discovered by James Edward Keeler in 1888. The second major gap in the A ring, discovered by Voyager, was named the Keeler Gap in his honor.

The Encke Gap is a gap because it is entirely within the A Ring. There was some ambiguity between the terms gap and division until the IAU clarified the definitions in 2008; before that, the separation was sometimes called the "Encke Division".

=== Keeler Gap ===
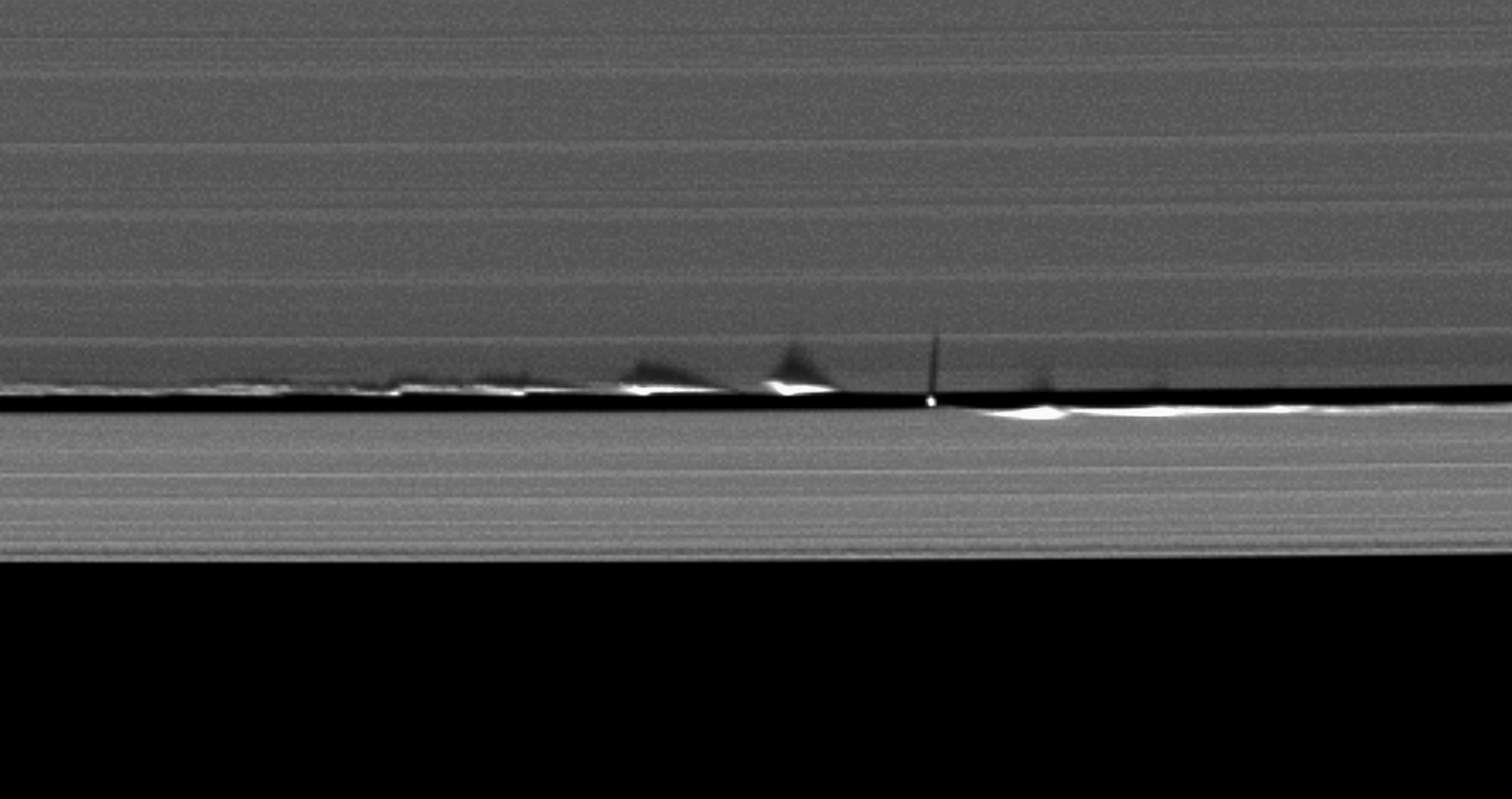
View of Daphnis orbiting in the Keeler Gap, creating waves that cast shadows across the rings

The Keeler Gap is a 42-km (26 mile) wide gap in the A ring, approximately 250 km (150 miles) from the ring's outer edge. The small moon Daphnis, discovered 1 May 2005, orbits within it, keeping it clear. The moon's passage induces waves in the edges of the gap (this is also influenced by its slight orbital eccentricity). Because the orbit of Daphnis is slightly inclined to the ring plane, the waves have a component that is perpendicular to the ring plane, reaching a distance of 1500 m "above" the plane.

The Keeler gap was discovered by Voyager, and named in honor of the astronomer James Edward Keeler. Keeler had in turn discovered and named the Encke Gap in honor of Johann Encke.

=== Propeller moonlets ===
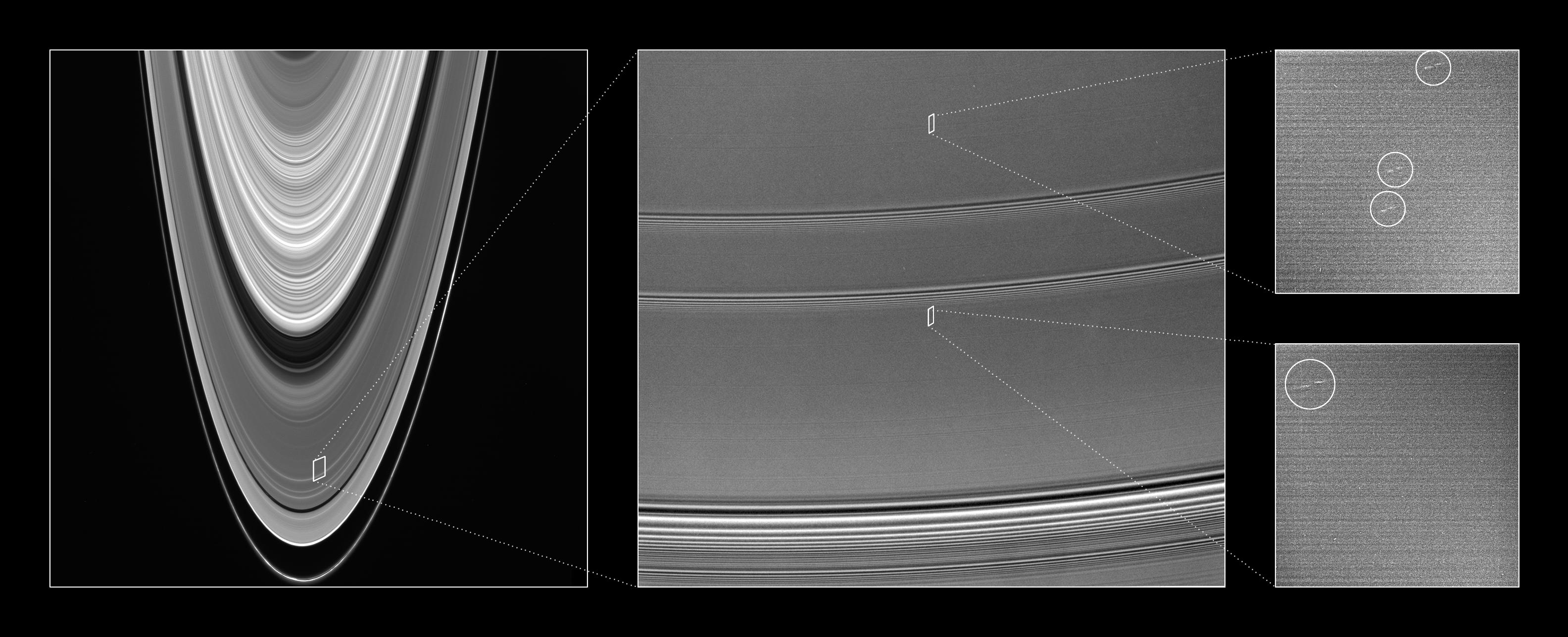
Location of the first four moonlets detected in the A Ring

In 2006, four tiny "moonlets" were found in Cassini images of the A Ring. The moonlets themselves are only about a hundred meters in diameter, too small to be seen directly; what Cassini sees are the "propeller"-shaped disturbances the moonlets create, which are several km (miles) across. It is estimated that the A Ring contains thousands of such objects. In 2007, the discovery of eight more moonlets revealed that they are largely confined to a 3,000 km (2000 mile) belt, about 130,000 km (80,000 miles) from Saturn's center, and by 2008 over 150 propeller moonlets had been detected. One that has been tracked for several years has been nicknamed Bleriot.

== Roche Division ==
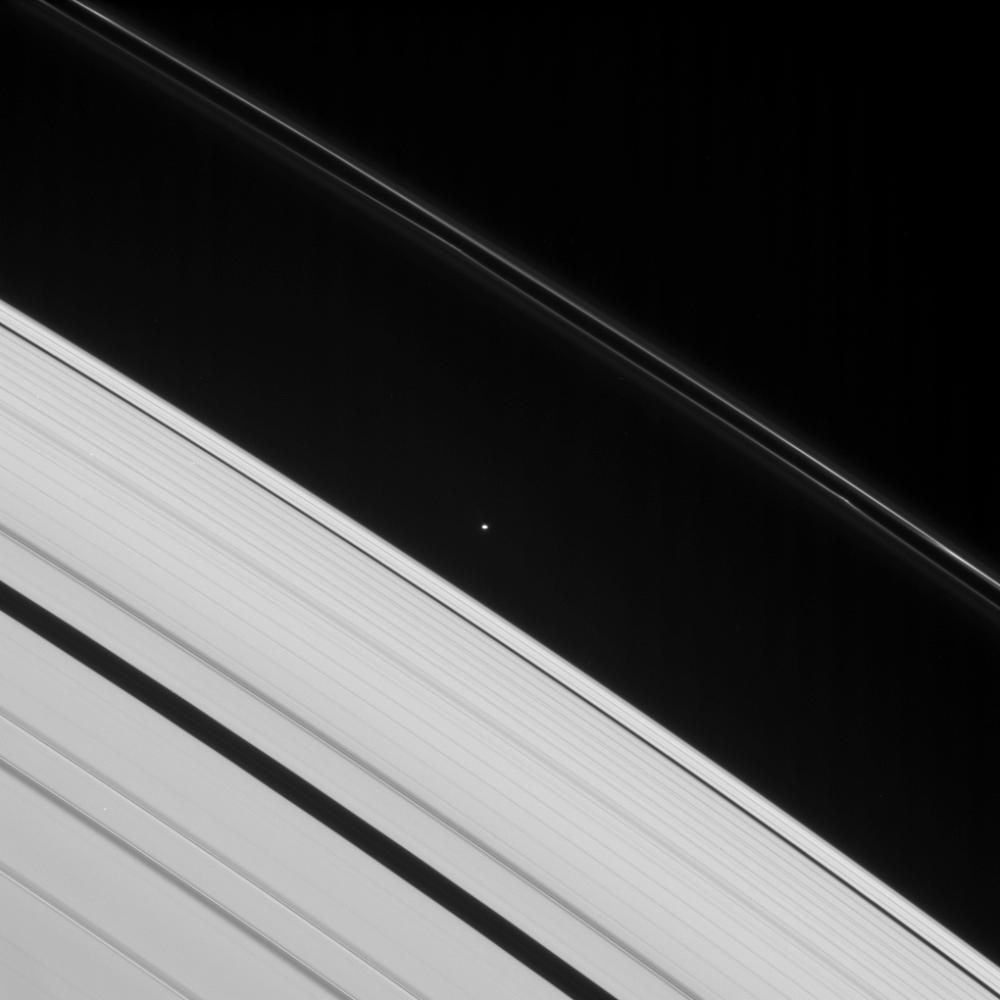
The Roche Division (passing through image center) between the A Ring and the F Ring. Atlas, the Encke Gap, and the Keeler Gap are visible.

The separation between the A ring and the F Ring has been named the Roche Division in honor of the French physicist Édouard Roche. The Roche Division should not be confused with the Roche limit which is the distance at which a large object is so close to a planet (such as Saturn) that the planet's tidal forces will pull it apart. Lying at the outer edge of the main ring system, the Roche Division is in fact close to Saturn's Roche limit, which is why the rings have been unable to accrete into a moon.

Like the Cassini Division, the Roche Division is not empty but contains a sheet of material. The character of this material is similar to the tenuous and dusty D, E, and G Rings. Two locations in the Roche Division have a higher concentration of dust than the rest of the region. These were discovered by the Cassini probe imaging team and were given temporary designations: R/2004 S 1, which lies along the orbit of the moon Atlas; and R/2004 S 2, centered at 138,900 km (86,300 miles) from Saturn's center, inward of the orbit of Prometheus.

== F Ring ==
The small moons Pandora (left) and Prometheus (right) orbit on either side of the F ring. Prometheus acts as a ring shepherd and is followed by dark channels that it has carved into the inner strands of the ring.

The F Ring is the outermost discrete ring of Saturn and perhaps the most active ring in the Solar System, with features changing on a timescale of hours. It is located 3,000 km (2000 miles) beyond the outer edge of the A ring. The ring was discovered in 1979 by the Pioneer 11 imaging team. It is very thin, just a few hundred km in radial extent. While the traditional view has been that it is held together by two shepherd moons, Prometheus and Pandora, which orbit inside and outside it, recent studies indicate that only Prometheus contributes to the confinement. Numerical simulations suggest the ring was formed when Prometheus and Pandora collided with each other and were partially disrupted.

More recent closeup images from the Cassini probe show that the F Ring consists of one core ring and a spiral strand around it. They also show that when Prometheus encounters the ring at its apoapsis, its gravitational attraction creates kinks and knots in the F Ring as the moon 'steals' material from it, leaving a dark channel in the inner part of the ring. Since Prometheus orbits Saturn more rapidly than the material in the F ring, each new channel is carved about 3.2 degrees in front of the previous one.

In 2008, further dynamism was detected, suggesting that small unseen moons orbiting within the F Ring are continually passing through its narrow core because of perturbations from Prometheus. One of the small moons was tentatively identified as S/2004 S 6.

As of 2023, the clumpy structure of the ring "is thought to be caused by the presence of thousands of small parent bodies (1.0 to 0.1 km in size) that collide and produce dense strands of micrometer- to centimeter-sized particles that re-accrete over a few months onto the parent bodies in a steady-state regime."

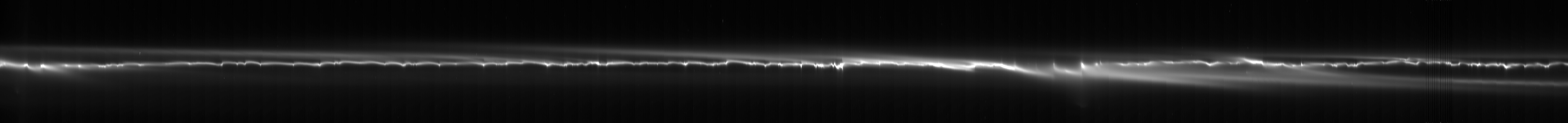
A mosaic of 107 images showing 255° (about 70%) of the F Ring as it would appear if straightened out, showing the kinked primary strand and the spiral secondary strand. The radial width (top to bottom) is 1,500 km (1000 miles).

== Outer rings ==
The outer rings seen back-illuminated by the Sun

=== Janus/Epimetheus Ring ===
A faint dust ring is present around the region occupied by the orbits of Janus and Epimetheus, as revealed by images taken in forward-scattered light by the Cassini spacecraft in 2006. The ring has a radial extent of about 5,000 km (3000 miles). Its source is particles blasted off the moons' surfaces by meteoroid impacts, which then form a diffuse ring around their orbital paths.

=== G Ring ===
The G Ring is a very thin, faint ring about halfway between the F Ring and the beginning of the E Ring, with its inner edge about 15,000 km (10,000 miles) inside the orbit of Mimas. It contains a single distinctly brighter arc near its inner edge (similar to the arcs in the rings of Neptune) that extends about one-sixth of its circumference, centered on the half-km (500 yard) diameter moonlet Aegaeon, which is held in place by a 7:6 orbital resonance with Mimas. The arc is believed to be composed of icy particles up to a few m in diameter, with the rest of the G Ring consisting of dust released from within the arc. The radial width of the arc is about 250 km (150 miles), compared to a width of 9,000 km (6000 miles) for the G Ring as a whole. The arc is thought to contain matter equivalent to a small icy moonlet about a hundred m in diameter. Dust released from Aegaeon and other source bodies within the arc by micrometeoroid impacts drifts outward from the arc because of interaction with Saturn's magnetosphere (whose plasma corotates with Saturn's magnetic field, which rotates much more rapidly than the orbital motion of the G Ring). These tiny particles are steadily eroded away by further impacts and dispersed by plasma drag. Over the course of thousands of years the ring gradually loses mass, which is replenished by further impacts on Aegaeon.

=== Methone Ring Arc ===
A faint ring arc, first detected in September 2006, covering a longitudinal extent of about 10 degrees is associated with the moon Methone. The material in the arc is believed to represent dust ejected from Methone by micrometeoroid impacts. The confinement of the dust within the arc is attributable to a 14:15 resonance with Mimas (similar to the mechanism of confinement of the arc within the G ring). Under the influence of the same resonance, Methone librates back and forth in its orbit with an amplitude of 5° of longitude.

=== Anthe Ring Arc ===
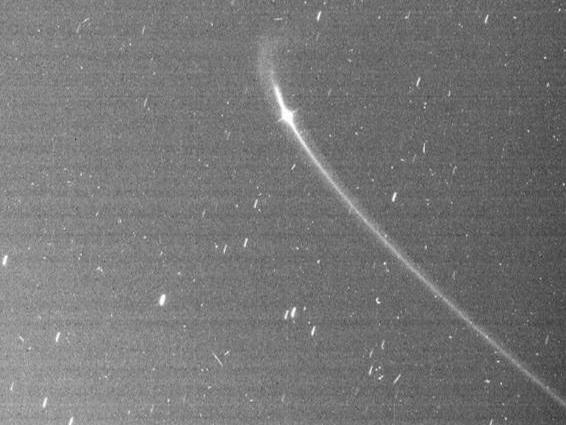
The Anthe Ring Arc – the bright spot is Anthe

A faint ring arc, first detected in June 2007, covering a longitudinal extent of about 20 degrees is associated with the moon Anthe. The material in the arc is believed to represent dust knocked off Anthe by micrometeoroid impacts. The confinement of the dust within the arc is attributable to a 10:11 resonance with Mimas. Under the influence of the same resonance, Anthe drifts back and forth in its orbit over 14° of longitude.

=== Pallene Ring ===
A faint dust ring shares Pallene's orbit, as revealed by images taken in forward-scattered light by the Cassini spacecraft in 2006. The ring has a radial extent of about 2,500 km (1500 miles). Its source is particles blasted off Pallene's surface by meteoroid impacts, which then form a diffuse ring around its orbital path.

=== E Ring ===
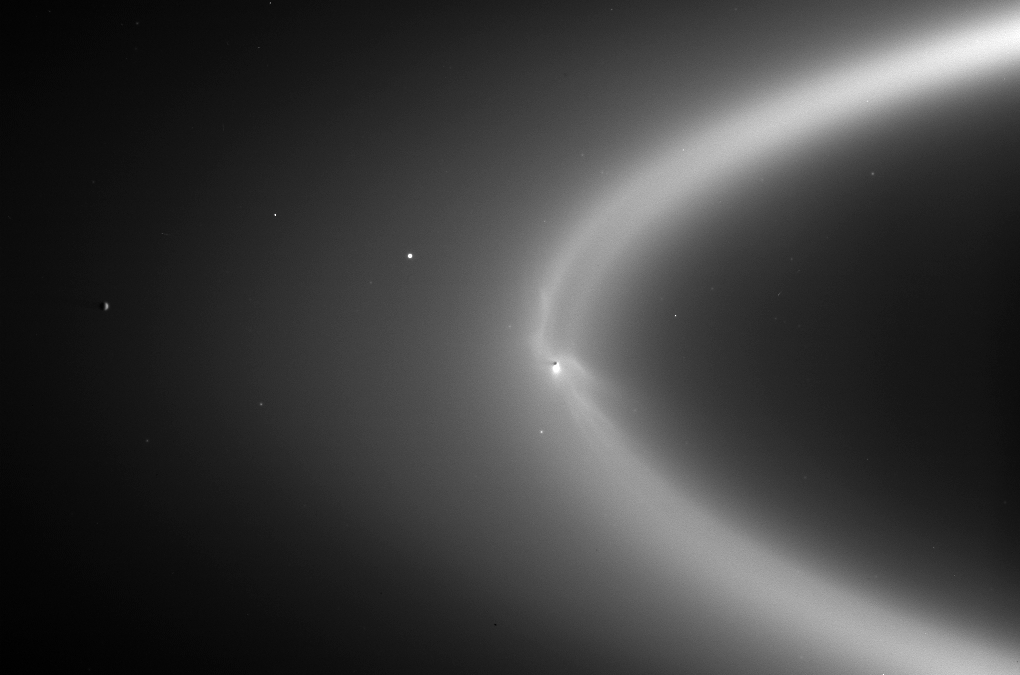
The backlit E ring, with Enceladus silhouetted against it. The moon's south polar jets erupt brighty below it.

Unconfirmed until 1980, the existence of the E ring was a subject of debate among astronomers at least as far back as 1908. In a narrative timeline of Saturn observations, Arthur Francis O'Donel Alexander attributes the first observation of what would come to be called the E Ring to Georges Fournier, who on 5 September 1907 at Mont Revard observed a "luminous zone" "surrounding the outer bright ring." The next year, on 7 October 1908, E. Schaer independently observed "a new dusky ring...surrounding the bright rings of Saturn" at the Geneva Observatory. Following up on Schaer's discovery, W. Boyer, T. Lewis, and Arthur Eddington found signs of a discontinuous ring matching Schaer's description, but described their observations as "uncertain." After Edward Barnard, using the what was at the time the world's best telescope, failed to find signs of a ring. E. M. Antoniadi argued for the ring's existence in a 1909 publication, recalling a observations by William Wray on 26 December 1861 of a "very faint light...so as to give the impression that it was the dusky ring," but after Barnard's negative result most astronomers became skeptical of the E Ring's existence.

Unlike the A, B, and C rings, the E Ring's small optical depth and large vertical extent mean it is best viewed edge-on, which is only possible once every 14–15 years, so perhaps for this reason, it was not until the 1960s that the E Ring was again the subject of observations. Although some sources credit Walter Feibelman with the E Ring's discovery in 1966, his paper published the following year announcing the observations begins by acknowledging the existing controversy and the long record of observations both supporting and disputing the ring's existence, and carefully stresses his interpretation of the data as a new ring as "tentative only." A reanalysis of Feibelman's original observations, conducted in anticipation of the coming Saturn flyby by Pioneer 11, once again called the evidence for this outer ring "shaky." Even polarimetric observations by Pioneer 11 failed to conclusively identify E Ring during its 1979 flyby, though "its existence was inferred from [particle, radiation, and magnetic field measurements]." Only after a digital reanalysis of the 1966 observations as well as several independent observations using ground- and space-based telescopes existence was finally confirmed in a 1980 paper by Feibelman and Klinglesmith.

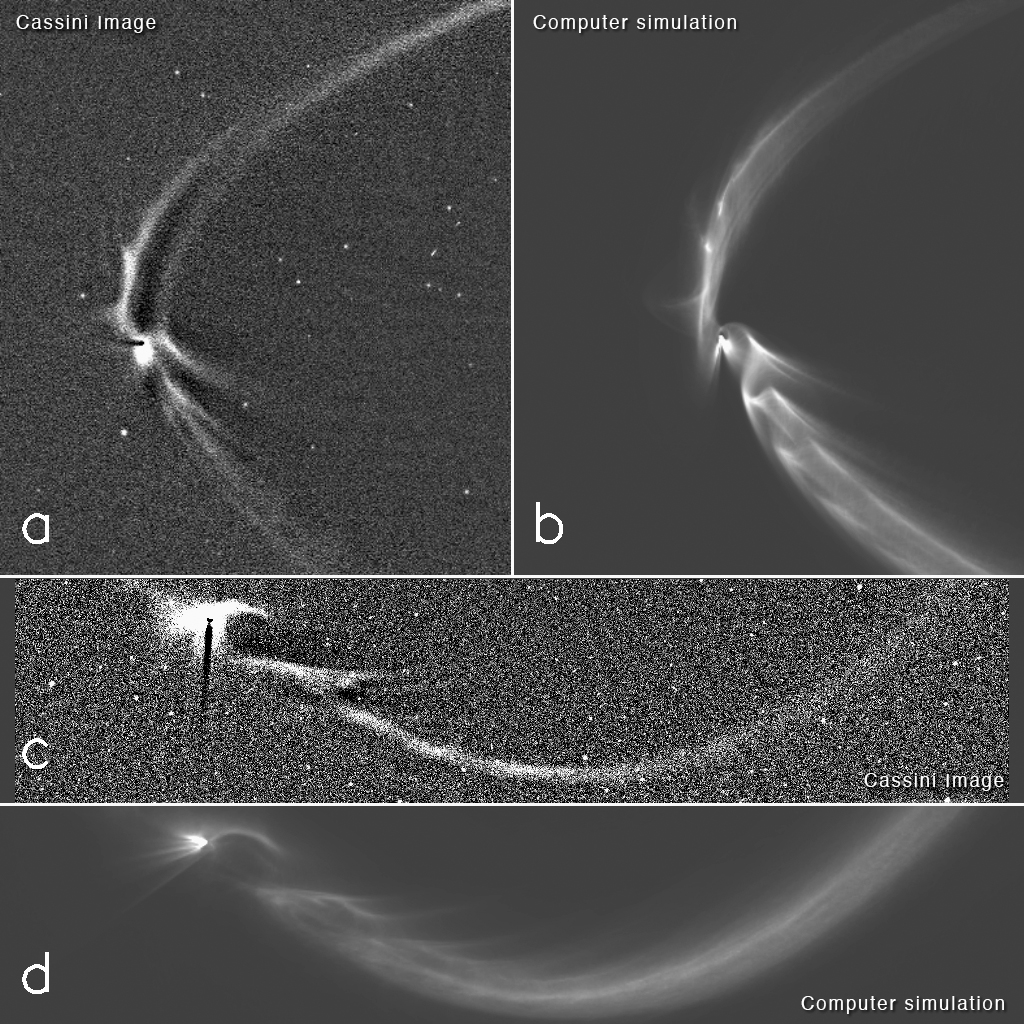
E Ring tendrils from Enceladus geysers - comparison of images (a, c) with computer simulations.

The E Ring is the second outermost ring and is extremely wide; it consists of many tiny (micron and sub-micron) particles of water ice with silicates, carbon dioxide and ammonia. The E Ring is distributed between the orbits of Mimas and Titan. Unlike the other rings, it is composed of microscopic particles rather than macroscopic ice chunks. In 2005, the source of the E Ring's material was determined to be cryovolcanic plumes emanating from the "tiger stripes" of the south polar region of the moon Enceladus. Unlike the main rings, the E Ring is more than 2,000 km (1000 miles) thick and increases with its distance from Enceladus. Tendril-like structures observed within the E Ring can be related to the emissions of the most active south polar jets of Enceladus.

Particles of the E Ring tend to accumulate on moons that orbit within it, primarily because of the orbital eccentricities of the particles and the closeness of other moons' semi-major axes to that of Enceladus. Particles encountering moons orbiting interior to Enceladus tend to move faster than them due to being near their pericenters, and so strike their trailing sides, and particles encountering moons orbiting exterior tend to move slower than the moons due to being near apocenter, and so strike their leading hemispheres. This makes it so that Janus, Epimetheus, and Mimas all have brighter trailing sides, while Tethys, Dione, and Rhea are brighter in their leading hemispheres. In addition, the equator of the leading hemisphere of Tethys is tinted slightly blue due to the infalling material. The trojan moons Telesto, Calypso, Helene and Polydeuces are particularly affected as their orbits move up and down the ring plane. This results in their surfaces being coated with bright material that smooths out features.

=== Phoebe ring ===
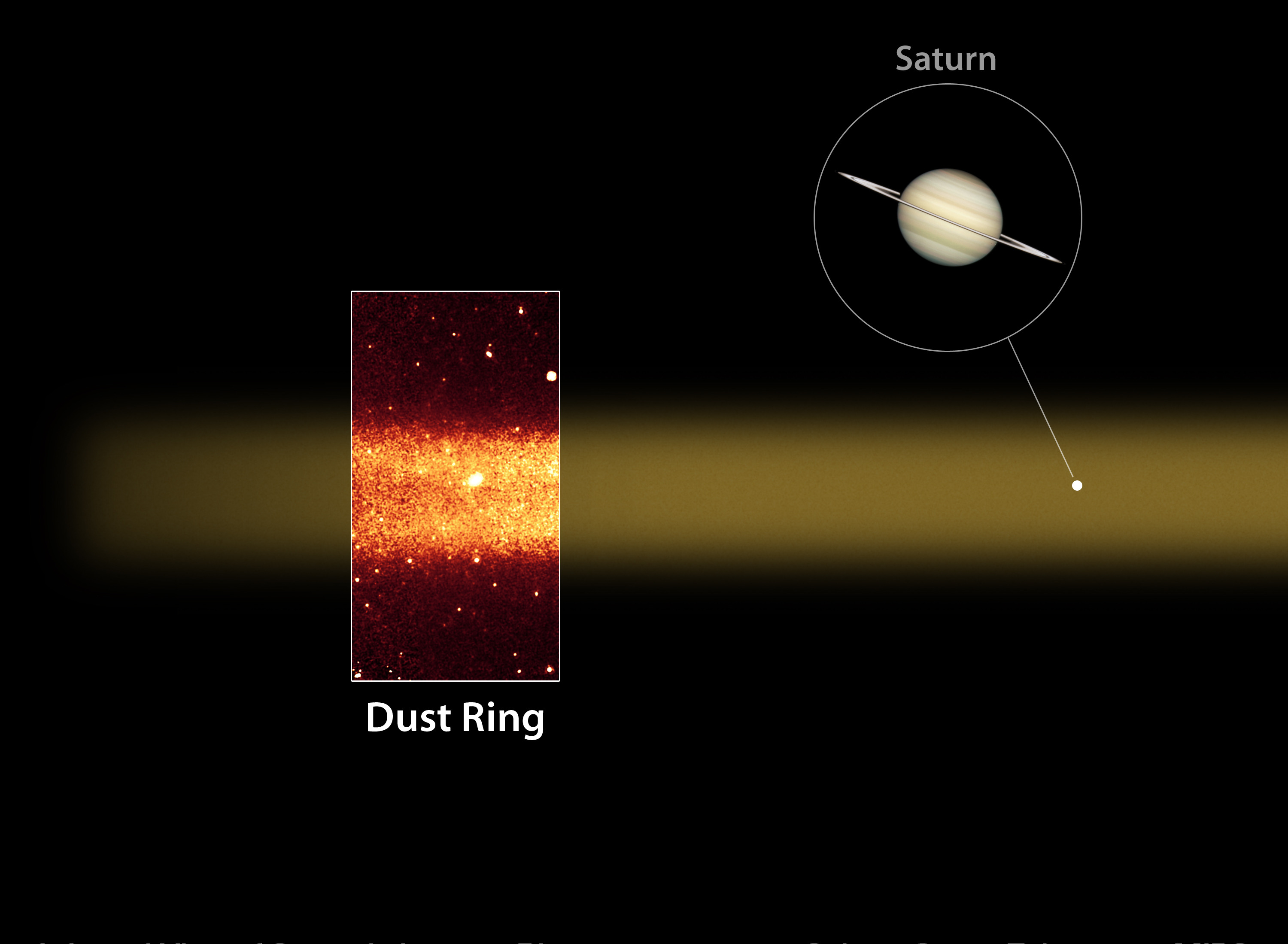
The Phoebe ring's huge extent dwarfs the main rings. Inset: 24 μm Spitzer image of part of the ring

In October 2009, the discovery of a tenuous disk of material just interior to the orbit of Phoebe was reported. The disk was aligned edge-on to Earth at the time of discovery. This disk can be loosely described as another ring. Although very large (as seen from Earth, the apparent size of two full moons), the ring is virtually invisible. It was discovered using NASA's infrared Spitzer Space Telescope, and was seen over the entire range of the observations, which extended from 128 to 207 times the radius of Saturn, with calculations indicating that it may extend outward up to 300 Saturn radii and inward to the orbit of Iapetus at 59 Saturn radii. The ring was subsequently studied using the WISE, Herschel and Cassini spacecraft; WISE observations show that it extends from at least between 50 and 100 to 270 Saturn radii (the inner edge is lost in the planet's glare). Data obtained with WISE indicate the ring particles are small; those with radii greater than 10 cm comprise 10% or less of the cross-sectional area.

Phoebe orbits the planet at a distance ranging from 180 to 250 radii. The ring has a thickness of about 40 radii. Because the ring's particles are presumed to have originated from impacts (micrometeoroid and larger) on Phoebe, they should share its retrograde orbit, which is opposite to the orbital motion of the next inner moon, Iapetus. This ring lies in the plane of Saturn's orbit, or roughly the ecliptic, and thus is tilted 27 degrees from Saturn's equatorial plane and the other rings. Phoebe is inclined by 5° with respect to Saturn's orbit plane (often written as 175°, due to Phoebe's retrograde orbital motion), and its resulting vertical excursions above and below the ring plane agree closely with the ring's observed thickness of 40 Saturn radii.

The existence of the ring was proposed in the 1970s by Steven Soter. The discovery was made by Anne J. Verbiscer and Michael F. Skrutskie (of the University of Virginia) and Douglas P. Hamilton (of the University of Maryland, College Park). The three had studied together at Cornell University as graduate students.

Ring material migrates inward due to reemission of solar radiation, with a speed inversely proportional to particle size; a 3 cm particle would migrate from the vicinity of Phoebe to that of Iapetus over the age of the Solar System. The material would thus strike the leading hemisphere of Iapetus. Infall of this material causes a slight darkening and reddening of the leading hemisphere of Iapetus (similar to what is seen on the Uranian moons Oberon and Titania) but does not directly create the dramatic two-tone coloration of that moon. Rather, the infalling material initiates a positive feedback thermal self-segregation process of ice sublimation from warmer regions, followed by vapor condensation onto cooler regions. This leaves a dark residue of "lag" material covering most of the equatorial region of Iapetus's leading hemisphere, which contrasts with the bright ice deposits covering the polar regions and most of the trailing hemisphere.

== See also ==
- Galileo Galilei – the first person to observe Saturn's rings, in 1610
- Christiaan Huygens – the first to propose that there was a ring surrounding Saturn, in 1655
- Giovanni Cassini – discovered the separation between the A and B rings (the Cassini Division), in 1675
- Édouard Roche – French astronomer who described how a satellite that comes within the Roche limit of Saturn could break up and form the rings
