= Aegaeon (moon) =

Moon of Saturn

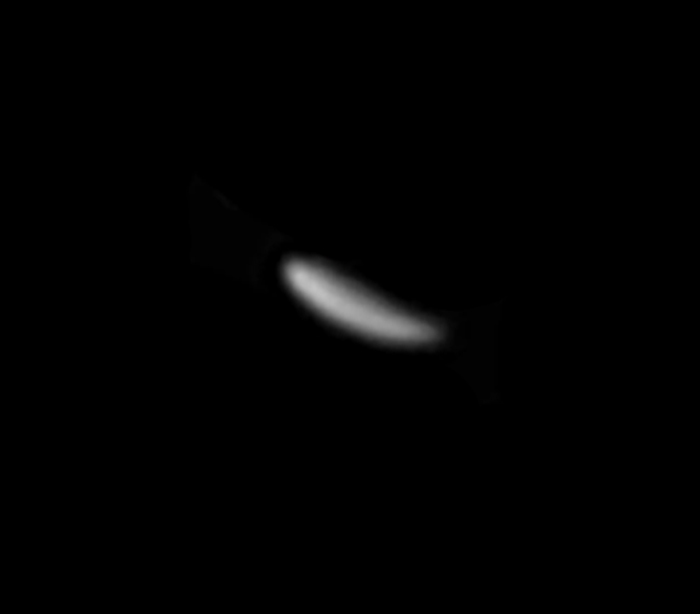
- Aegaeon's crescent imaged by the Cassini spacecraft from a distance of 15238.2 km in 2010

Discovery
- Discovered by: Carolyn Porco
- Discovery date: March 3, 2009
- Detection method: Cassini Imaging Science Team

Designations
- Designation: Saturn LIII
- Pronunciation: /iːˈdʒiːɒn/
- Named after: Αιγαίων Aigaiōn
- Adjectives: Aegaeonian /iːdʒiːˈoʊniən/

Orbital characteristics
- Epoch 2008 January 1.5 UTC
- Semi-major axis: 167494±4 km
- Eccentricity: 0.00024±0.00023
- Orbital period (sidereal): 0.808111 d
- Inclination: 0.0010°±0.0009° (to Saturn's equator)
- Satellite of: Saturn

Physical characteristics
- Dimensions: 1.40 × 0.50 × 0.40 km (± 0.10 × 0.12 × 0.16 km)
- Mean diameter: 0.66±0.12 km
- Volume: 0.15 km^{3} (Note: Calculated from Aegaeon's volume-equivalent sphere radius of 0.33±0.06 km given by Thomas et al. (2020))
- Mass: (7.82±3.00)×10^{10} kg
- Mean density: 0.539±0.140 g/cm^{3}
- Surface gravity: 0.009–0.013 mm/s^{2} (0.9–1.3 micro-g)
- Escape velocity: 0.001 km/s at longest axis to 0.002 km/s at poles
- Synodic rotation period: synchronous
- Axial tilt: assumed zero
- Albedo: ≪0.15 (geometric); ~0.15 (spherical)

Aegaeon /iːˈdʒiːɒn/, or Saturn LIII (provisional designation S/2008 S 1), is a natural satellite of Saturn. It has an extremely elongated shape whose surface is thought to be similarly smooth as Methone. It orbits between Janus and Mimas within Saturn's G Ring, in a 7:6 orbital resonance with the latter. Compared to the similar moons Anthe and Methone, which are both in orbital resonances with Mimas, Aegaeon is more tightly trapped in its resonance than the other two. In addition, all three of the moons are associated with arc structures formed from material blasted off their surfaces, but Aegaeon is the smallest among the three while its arc is the brightest.

== Discovery and naming ==
Images of Aegaeon were taken by Cassini on 15 August 2008, and its discovery was announced on 3 March 2009 by Carolyn Porco of the Cassini Imaging Science Team using the provisional designation S/2008 S 1.

Aegaeon was named after one of the hekatonkheires on 5 May 2009.

== Orbit ==
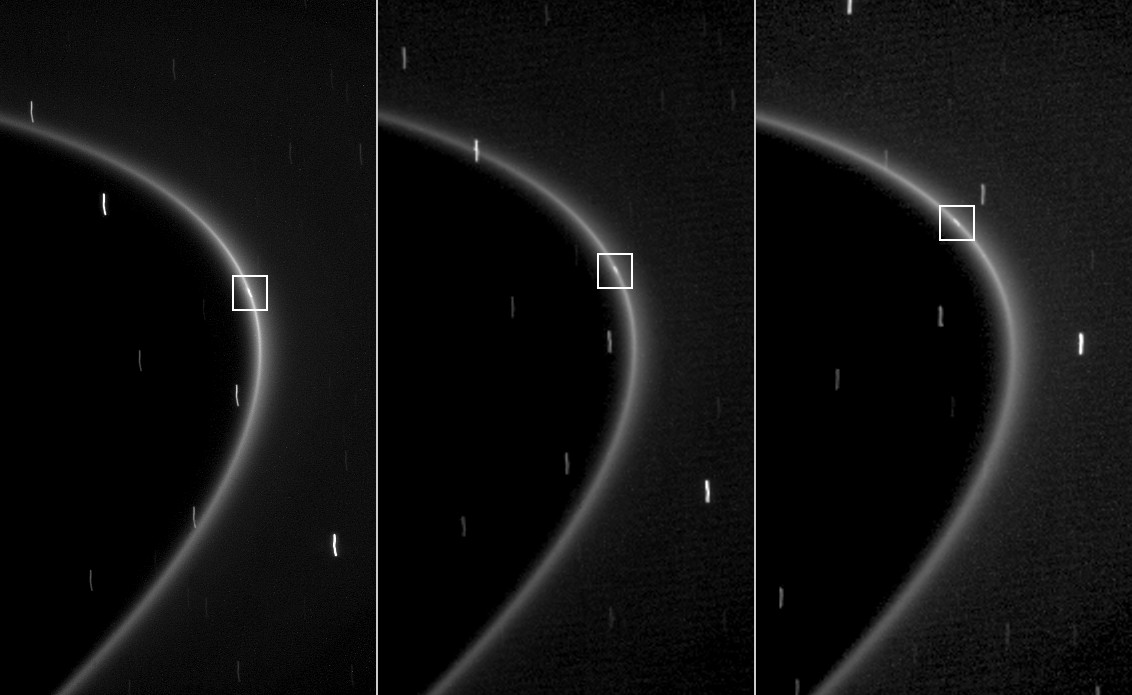
2008 Cassini images of the bright G Ring arc with Aegaeon embedded within it. These images were taken over the course of ten minutes.

Aegaeon orbits within the bright segment of Saturn's G Ring, and is probably a major source of the ring. Debris knocked off Aegaeon forms a bright arc near the inner edge, which in turn spreads to form the rest of the ring. Aegaeon orbits in a 7:6 corotation eccentricity resonance with Mimas, which causes an approximately 4-year oscillation of about 4 km in its semi-major axis, and a corresponding oscillation of a few degrees in its mean longitude. It orbits Saturn at an average distance of 167,500 km in 0.80812 days, at an inclination of 0.001° to Saturn's equator, with an eccentricity of 0.0002.

== Physical characteristics ==
Aegaeon is the smallest known moon of Saturn outside of the main rings and has an extremely elongated shape, measuring 1.4 km × 0.5 km × 0.4 km (0.87 mi × 0.31 mi × 0.25 mi) in size. Aegaeon is rounded into hydrostatic equillibrium likely due to a somewhat low density and a highly porous and icy interior structure. Aegaeon is exceptionally dark with an albedo of roughly 0.15, comparable to the dark side of Iapetus. This might be due to either darker meteoric material making up the dust in the G ring or due to Aegaeon having been disrupted, stripping away its ice-rich surface and leaving the rocky inner core behind.

== Exploration ==
The Cassini spacecraft has performed four flybys of Aegaeon closer than 20,000 km, though only one has occurred since its discovery in 2008. The closest of these pre-discovery encounters took place on 5 September 2005 at a distance of 8,517 km. An encounter on 27 January 2010 at a distance 13,306 km allowed Cassini to acquire its highest resolution images of Aegaeon. On 19 December 2015, Cassini was unable to capture any images from a planned close flyby.
