= Pallene (moon) =

Moon of Saturn

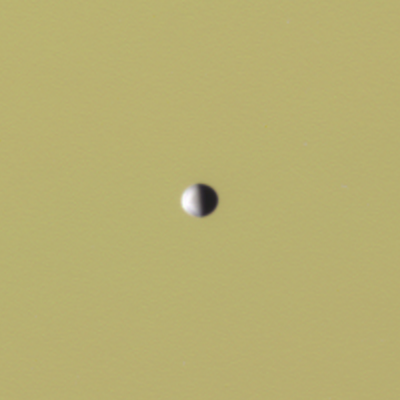
- Cassini image of Pallene in front of Saturn on October 16, 2010

Discovery
- Discovered by: Voyager 2 (first discovery); Cassini Imaging Team
- Discovery date: June 1, 2004 (second discovery by Cassini–Huygens)

Designations
- Designation: Saturn XXXIII
- Pronunciation: /pəˈliːniː/
- Named after: Παλλήνη Pallēnē
- Alternative names: S/1981 S 14 (first discovery); S/2004 S 2 (second discovery)
- Adjectives: Pallenean /pæləˈniːən/

Orbital characteristics
- Epoch 21 June 2004 (JD 2453177.5)
- Semi-major axis: 212280 km
- Eccentricity: 0.0040
- Orbital period (sidereal): 1.153746 d
- Inclination: 0.1813° (to Laplace plane)
- Satellite of: Saturn

Physical characteristics
- Dimensions: 5.76 × 4.16 × 3.68 km (± 0.14 × 0.14 × 0.14 km)
- Mean diameter: 4.46±0.14 km
- Volume: 46.5 km^{3} (Note: Calculated from Pallene's volume-equivalent sphere radius of 2.23±0.07 km given by Thomas et al. (2020))
- Mass: (1.15±0.40)×10^{13} kg
- Mean density: 0.251±0.075 g/cm^{3}
- Surface gravity: 0.011–0.016 mm/s^{2}
- Escape velocity: 0.0007 km/s at longest axis to 0.0009 km/s at poles
- Synodic rotation period: synchronous
- Axial tilt: assumed zero
- Albedo: 0.47±0.11 (geometric)

Pallene /pəˈliːniː/ is a very small natural satellite of Saturn. It is named after one of the Alkyonides of Greek mythology, and is also designated Saturn XXXIII. Its orbit lies between the orbits of the larger Mimas and Enceladus.

== Discovery ==
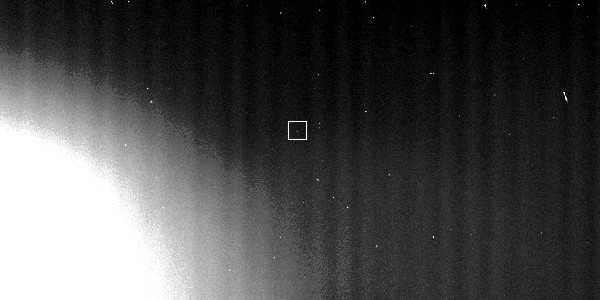
Discovery image of Pallene in 2004 from the Cassini probe

Pallene was discovered by the Cassini Imaging Team in 2004, during the Cassini–Huygens mission. It was given the temporary designation S/2004 S 2. In 2005, the name Pallene was provisionally approved by the IAU Division III Working Group for Planetary System Nomenclature, and was ratified at the IAU General Assembly in 2006. The name refers to Pallene, one of the Alkyonides, the seven beautiful daughters of the giant Alkyoneus.

After the discovery in 2004, it was realized that Pallene had been first photographed on August 23, 1981, by the space probe Voyager 2. It had appeared in a single photograph and had been provisionally named S/1981 S 14 and estimated to orbit 200,000 km from Saturn. Because it had not been visible in other images, it had not been possible to compute its orbit at the time, but more recent comparisons showed it to match Pallene's orbit.

== Orbital characteristics ==
Pallene is visibly affected by perturbations from the much larger Enceladus, although this effect is not as large as Mimas' perturbations on Methone. The perturbations cause Pallene's osculating orbital elements to vary with an amplitude of about 4 km in semi-major axis, and 0.02° in longitude (corresponding to about 75 km). Eccentricity also changes on various timescales between 0.002 and 0.006, and inclination between about 0.178° and 0.184°. It was previously thought that it was trapped in a 19:16 orbital resonance with Enceladus, but it is now known to be very close to but not actually in resonance.

=== Ring ===
Back-illuminated rings of Saturn as seen by Cassini on 15 September 2006. The faint Pallene ring is visible at the bottom left as indicated.

In 2006, images taken in forward-scattered light by the Cassini spacecraft enabled the Cassini Imaging Team to discover a faint dust ring around Saturn that shares Pallene's orbit, now named the Pallene Ring. The ring has a radial extent of about 2,500 km. Its source is particles blasted off Pallene's surface by meteoroid impacts, which then form a diffuse ring around its orbital path. Unlike the other ring-embedded moons, Methone, Anthe, and Aegaeon, Pallene has no associated arc structure with it. Because the other moons are in orbital resonances and Pallene is not, ejecta from their surfaces remains locked in the same resonance as the moon is, and so shape into an arc instead of a complete ring.

== Physical characteristics ==
Pallene, along with Aegaeon and Methone, are known to be smooth bodies with a ellipsoidal shape. All three moons have darker surfaces than expected, which could be due to the effects of high-energy radiation. Pallene is darker on its leading hemisphere than its trailing one by roughly 10–20%.

== Exploration ==
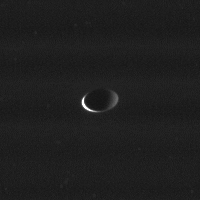
Pallene's crescent illuminated by Saturnshine, imaged by Cassini on 14 September 2011

The Cassini spacecraft, which studied Saturn and its moons until September 2017, performed a fly-by of Pallene on 16 October 2010, and 14 September 2011 at a distance of 36,000 kilometers (22,000 miles) and 44,000 kilometers respectively.
