= Arthur Alexander (disambiguation) =

Arthur Alexander (1940–1993) was an American country songwriter and soul singer.

Arthur Alexander may also refer to:

- Arthur Alexander (pianist) (1891–1969), New Zealand-born pianist and teacher active in the UK.
- Arthur Alexander (producer) (1909–1989), American independent film producer
- Arthur Francis O'Donel Alexander (1896–1971), English amateur astronomer and author
- Arthur Lewin Alexander (1907–1971), British police officer
- Arthur Alexander (album), a 1972 album released by Arthur Alexander

== See also ==
- Art Alexandre (1907–1976), Canadian ice hockey player
