= Methone (moon) =

Moon of Saturn

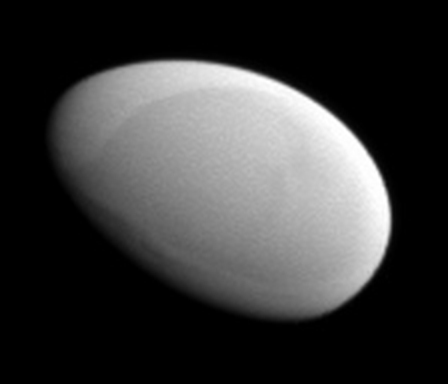
- Cassini image of Methone's leading side taken on 20 May 2012. Its unusually smooth surface is likely from the accumulation of dust

Discovery
- Discovered by: Cassini Imaging Team
- Discovery date: June 1, 2004

Designations
- Designation: Saturn XXXII
- Pronunciation: /mɛˈθoʊniː/
- Named after: Μεθώνη Methōnē
- Adjectives: Methonean /mɛθəˈniːən/

Orbital characteristics
- Epoch 21 June 2004 (JD 2453177.5)
- Semi-major axis: 194230 km
- Eccentricity: 0.0000
- Orbital period (sidereal): 1.009575 d
- Inclination: 0.0131° (to Laplace plane)
- Satellite of: Saturn

Physical characteristics
- Dimensions: 3.88 × 2.58 × 2.42 km (±0.04 × 0.08 × 0.04 km)
- Mean diameter: 2.90±0.06 km
- Volume: 12.8 km^{3} (Note: Calculated from Methone's volume-equivalent sphere radius of 1.45±0.03 km given by Thomas et al. (2020).)
- Mass: (3.92±1.00)×10^{12} kg
- Mean density: 0.307±0.030 g/cm^{3}
- Surface gravity: 0.008–0.013 mm/s^{2}
- Escape velocity: 0.0005 km/s at longest axis to 0.0007 km/s at poles
- Synodic rotation period: synchronous
- Axial tilt: assumed zero
- Albedo: 0.57±0.05 (geometric)

Methone /mɛˈθoʊniː/ is a small, egg-shaped natural satellite of Saturn that orbits out past Saturn's main ring system, between the orbits of Mimas and Enceladus. It was discovered in 2004, though it was not until 2012 that it was imaged in detail by the Cassini spacecraft.

== Discovery and naming ==
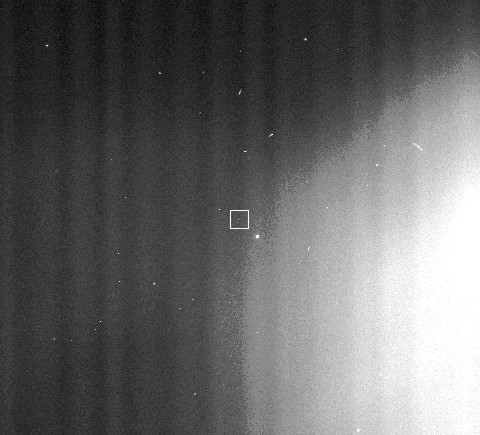
Discovery image of Methone on 1 June 2004

Methone was first discovered by the Cassini Imaging Team and given the temporary designation S/2004 S 1. Methone is also named Saturn XXXII (32). The Cassini spacecraft made two visits to Methone, and its closest approach was made on May 20, 2012 with a minimum distance of 1,900 km (1,181 mi) from it.

The name Methone was approved by the IAU Working Group on Planetary System Nomenclature on January 21, 2005. It was ratified at the IAU General Assembly in 2006. Methone (Greek Μεθώνη) was one of the Alkyonides, the seven beautiful daughters of the Giant Alkyoneus.

== Orbit ==
Methone's orbit is perturbed by a 14:15 mean-motion resonance with the much larger Mimas. This causes its osculating orbital elements to vary with an amplitude of about 20 km (12 mi) in semi-major axis, and 5° in longitude of its periapsis on a timescale of about 450 days. Its eccentricity also varies, albeit on different timescales, between 0.0011 and 0.0037, and its inclination between about 0.003° and 0.020°.

=== Relationship with Saturn's rings ===
Material blasted off Methone by micrometeoroid impacts is believed to be the source of the Methone Ring Arc, a faint partial ring around Saturn co-orbital with Methone that was discovered in September 2006.

== Physical characteristics ==
In May 2012, the Cassini spacecraft took its first close-up photographs of Methone, revealing a remarkably smooth, but non-spherical moonlet. The other arc-embedded moonlets, Pallene and Anthe, are thought to be similar.

Methone's smoothness and excellent ellipsoidal fits suggest that it has developed an equipotential surface, and this may be composed largely of an icy fluff, a material that might be mobile enough to explain the moonlet's lack of craters. This material property causes Methone to take the shape of a triaxial ellipsoid, a type of ellipsoid in which all 3 of its principal axes are of different lengths. These differences reflect the balance between tidal forces exerted by Saturn and centrifugal forces from the moonlet's own rotation, as well as the moonlet's own force of gravity.

Methone's longest axis points towards Saturn, and is 1.6x longer than its polar axis. This elongation is caused by tidal forces, whereas the elongation of its intermediate-length axis (1.07x the length of the polar axis) is caused by the centrifugal force of Methone's rotation. Assuming that Methone is in hydrostatic equilibrium, i.e. that its elongated shape simply reflects the balance between the tidal force exerted by Saturn and Methone's gravity, its density can be estimated: 0.31+0.05
−0.03 g/cm^{3}, among the lowest density values obtained or inferred for a Solar System body.

Methone's low-density regolith may respond to impacts in a way that smooths its surface more rapidly than on rigid moonlets such as Janus or Epimetheus. Movement of the regolith may also be facilitated by more "exotic" processes such as electrostatic effects.

Methone has two sharply defined albedo regions, with albedos of 0.61±0.06 and 0.7±0.03. The darker of these regions is centered on Methone's leading side, reminiscent of the thermal anomalies on the leading hemispheres of Mimas and Tethys, and it has been suggested that increased exposure to electrons from Saturn's magnetosphere is responsible. However, in those examples, the thermal anomalies coincide with a distinct UV/IR coloration, which in the case of Methone is either highly subdued or undetectable. Thus a physical, rather than compositional difference may be responsible. Possibilities include variations in regolith grain size, compaction, or particle microstructure.
