= Anthe (moon) =

Moon of Saturn

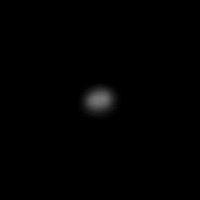
- Anthe as imaged by the Cassini orbiter in January 2016

Discovery
- Discovered by: Cassini Imaging Team
- Discovery date: May 30, 2007

Designations
- Designation: Saturn XLIX
- Pronunciation: /ˈænθiː/ (Note: This name is too new to appear in dictionaries, but the OED has the analogous rhodanthe /roʊˈdænθiː/ from the same root.)
- Named after: Άνθη Anthē
- Adjectives: Anthean /ænˈθiːən/

Orbital characteristics
- Epoch 2007 May 30 04:02:02.511 UTC (JED 2454250.66883907)
- Semi-major axis: 197655±26 km
- Eccentricity: 0.0012±0.0008
- Orbital period (sidereal): 1.036517 d
- Average orbital speed: 13.824 km/s
- Inclination: 0.017°±0.004° (to Saturn's equator)
- Satellite of: Saturn

Physical characteristics
- Mean radius: 0.75–2.4 km
- Mean density: 0.5 g/cm^{3} (assumed)
- Synodic rotation period: assumed synchronous
- Axial tilt: assumed zero
- Albedo: 0.25–1 (geometric)

Anthe /ˈænθiː/ is a very small natural satellite of Saturn lying between the orbits of Mimas and Enceladus. It is also known as Saturn XLIX; its provisional designation was S/2007 S 4. It is named after one of the Alkyonides; the name means flowery. It is the sixtieth confirmed moon of Saturn.

The designation S/2007 S 4 was also accidentally and incorrectly used for a different Saturnian satellite discovered later. The published discovery was retracted a few hours later and republished the next day under the correct name of S/2007 S 5.

== Discovery ==
It was discovered by the Cassini Imaging Team in images taken on 30 May 2007. Once the discovery was made, a search of older Cassini images revealed it in observations from as far back as June 2004. It was first announced on 18 July 2007.

== Characteristics ==
Discovery images of Anthe

Anthe is visibly affected by a perturbing 10:11 mean-longitude resonance with the much larger Mimas. This causes its osculating orbital elements to vary with an amplitude of about 20 km in semi-major axis on a timescale of about 2 Earth years. The close proximity to the orbits of Pallene and Methone suggests that these moons may form a dynamical family.

The ratio of Anthe's medium axis to its long axis is ≈0.7, and the ratio of its short axis to its medium axis is ≈0.95. This implies that it has a similar shape to Methone.

Material blasted off Anthe by micrometeoroid impacts is thought to be the source of the Anthe Ring Arc, a faint partial ring about Saturn co-orbital with the moon first detected in June 2007.
