= Arthur Francis O'Donel Alexander =

English amateur astronomer and writer

Arthur Francis O'Donel Alexander (1896–1971) was an English amateur astronomer and writer. He is best known for his books The Planet Saturn - A History of Observation, Theory and Discovery (1962), and The Planet Uranus - A History of Observation, Theory and Discovery (1965), historical accounts of the observations of these planets from the earliest date up to the date of publication.

A historian by training, who wrote his PhD on two years of the Hundred Years' War, he was an educational administrator and, at his retirement, Head of Education for Dorset after returning to UK from Japan, where he had previously been teaching English. He lived for many years in Dorchester where he was a keen observer of the night sky.
