= Centaurus (spacecraft) =

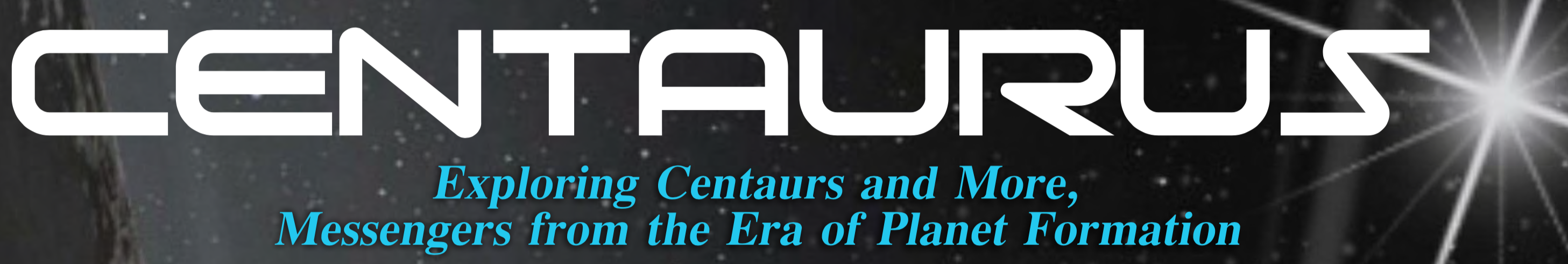
- Mission type: Flyby
- Operator: NASA

Spacecraft properties
- Manufacturer: Lockheed Martin (proposed)

Start of mission
- Launch date: 2026–2029 (proposed)

Instruments
- Imagers, spectrometers

Centaurus is a mission concept to flyby the centaurs 2060 Chiron and Schwassmann–Wachmann 1. It was submitted in response to the NASA Discovery program call for proposals in 2019 but ultimately was not among the four missions selected for further development by NASA in February 2020. If it had been selected, Centaurus would have been the first mission to attempt a flyby of a centaur.

== Overview ==
If selected, Centaurus would have been capable of launching in any year between 2026 and 2029. The primary targets of the Centaurus mission were the centaurs 2060 Chiron and 29P/Schwassmann–Wachmann (often shortened to "SW1"). Centaurs are "escapees" from the Kuiper belt with giant planet-crossing orbits. Both objects are active centaurs with perihelia within the orbit of Saturn. The Centaurus payload included imagers and spectrometers to study the surfaces, comae, and any potential rings and shepherd moons around these objects. Use of solar panels would have eliminated the need for radioisotope thermoelectric generators (RTGs) or other nuclear sources.

Both mission targets show evidence for rings and/or cometary activity. Chiron is the second largest known centaur, by diameter, after 10199 Chariklo. Activity was identified in the past, which appears to feed its rapidly-evolving ring system. SW1 is the most active centaur known, averaging over 7 periods of activity each year. This equates to an outburst of cometary activity approximately every 50 days. Thus, there was a high likelihood of Centaurus flying by SW1 during a period of activity.

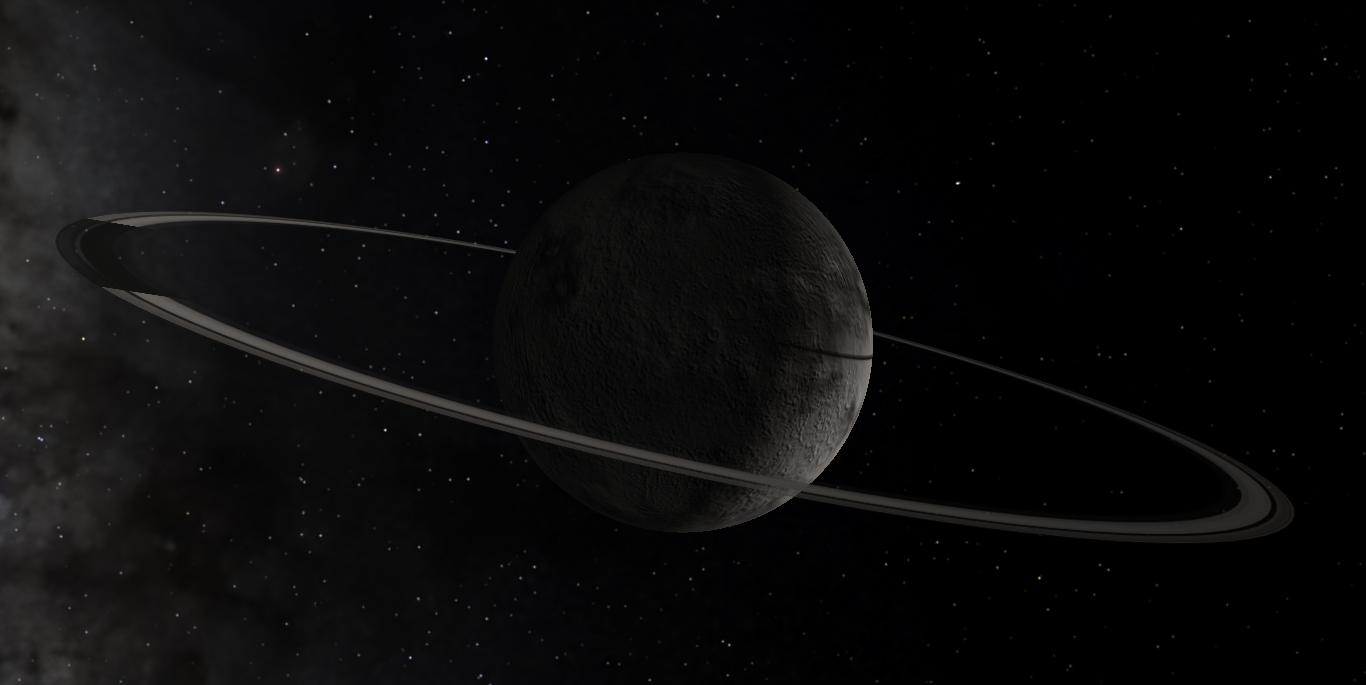
Depiction of Chiron with rings.

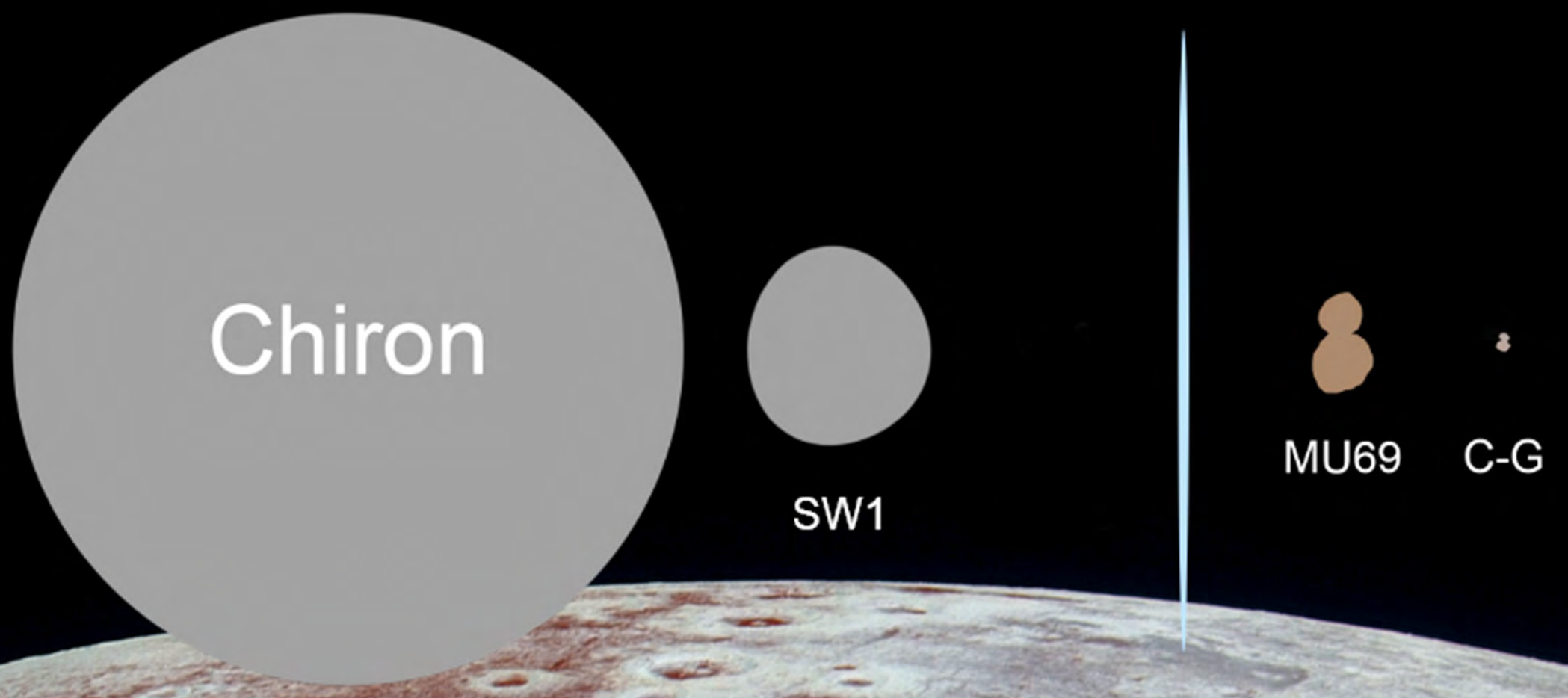
Comparison of Chiron and 29P to 486958 Arrokoth and comet 67P/Churyumov–Gerasimenko. Pluto is shown at the bottom of the image.

== Mission leadership ==
Centaurus is a joint proposal of the Southwest Research Institute (SwRI) and the Jet Propulsion Laboratory (JPL). The Johns Hopkins University Applied Physics Laboartory (APL) and NASA Goddard Spaceflight Center are also involved. The principal investigator (PI) of the Centaurus mission is Alan Stern of SwRI in Boulder, Colorado. The Deputy PI is Kelsi Singer of SwRI.

== See also ==
- List of missions to minor planets
- List of Solar System probes
- Camilla
