= (523727) 2014 NW65 =

Centaur asteroid

(523727) 2014 NW_{65}
Discovery
- Discovered by: Pan-STARRS 1
- Discovery site: Haleakala Obs.
- Discovery date: 14 July 2010

Designations
- Minor planet category: centaur · distant

Orbital characteristics
- Epoch 25 February 2023 (JD 2460000.5)
- Uncertainty parameter 2
- Observation arc: 12.45 yr (4,546 d)
- Aphelion: 35.388 AU
- Perihelion: 11.185 AU
- Semi-major axis: 23.286 AU
- Eccentricity: 0.5197
- Orbital period (sidereal): 112.37 yr (41,044 d)
- Mean anomaly: 311.34°
- Mean motion: 0° 0^{m} 31.68^{s} / day
- Inclination: 20.424°
- Longitude of ascending node: 216.01°
- Argument of perihelion: 232.73°

Physical characteristics
- Mean diameter: 212 km 213 km
- Geometric albedo: 0.08 (est.); 0.09 (est.)
- Absolute magnitude (H): 6.5; 6.8

(523727) 2014 NW_{65} is a large centaur from the outer Solar System, approximately 220 kilometers (140 miles) in diameter. It was discovered on 14 July 2010 by astronomers with the Pan-STARRS-1 survey at Haleakala Observatory, Hawaii, in the United States. The minor planet was numbered in 2018 and has not been named.

== Orbit and classification ==
2014 NW_{65} is a member of the centaurs, an inward-moving population of bodies transiting from the Kuiper belt to the group of Jupiter-family comets. Their eccentric orbits are often in between those of Jupiter and Neptune, that is, they have a semi-major axis of typically 5.5 to 30.1 AU. Centaurs are cometary-like bodies. They have a short dynamical lifetime due to the perturbing forces exerted on them by the Solar System's outer planets.

It orbits the Sun at a distance of 11.2–35.4 AU once every 112 years and 4 months (41,044 days; semi-major axis of 23.29 AU). Its orbit has an eccentricity of 0.52 and an inclination of 20° with respect to the ecliptic. It has 3 precovery observations back to 2009.

== Numbering and naming ==
This minor planet was numbered by the Minor Planet Center on 25 September 2018, receiving the number 523727 in the minor planet catalog (M.P.C. 111779). As of 2025, it has not been named. According to the established naming conventions, it will be named after one of the many centaurs from Greek mythology, which are creatures with the upper body of a human and the lower body and legs of a horse.

== Physical characteristics ==
=== Diameter and albedo ===
2014 NW_{65} has an absolute magnitude of 6.5. According to Johnston's Archive and astronomer Michael Brown, it measures 212 and 213 kilometers in diameter, based on an assumed albedo for the body's surface of 0.09 and 0.08, respectively. It is one of the largest centaurs, comparable in size with 2060 Chiron, 10199 Chariklo, and 54598 Bienor.

As of 2021, no physical characteristics have been determined from photometric observations. The body's color, rotation period, pole and shape remain unknown.

== See also ==
- List of centaurs (small Solar System bodies) § 523727
