= Camilla (spacecraft) =

Camilla is a spacecraft and mission concept proposed for NASA’s New Frontiers program. It would be a centaur exploration mission, particularly to minor planet 10199 Chariklo. It consists of a flyby craft (Camilla), and tungsten impactor (Halberd).

== Goals ==
The goals of this mission would be to understand the formation of centaurs, find if shepherd moons exist around Chariklo, and study the nature of the asteroid's rings formation.

== Mission design ==
The spacecraft would be launched in September 2026, using one gravity assist from Venus in February 2027 and Earth in December 2027 and 2029 to accelerate it out toward Jupiter. The Jupiter flyby in October 2031 will send it out of the ecliptic toward its Chariklo encounter in January 2039 before continuing to escape the Solar System. The spacecraft would be powered by a Multi-Mission RTG, and would be propelled by hydrazine thrusters. The scientific payload would consist of a tungsten impactor, high quality imaging equipment, spectral scanners, and a sub-millimeter radiometer.
