= Centaur Chiron =

Centaur Chiron may refer to:

- Chiron, a centaur in Greek mythology
- 2060 Chiron, a centaur in astronomy
