= Pandora (moon) =

Moon of Saturn

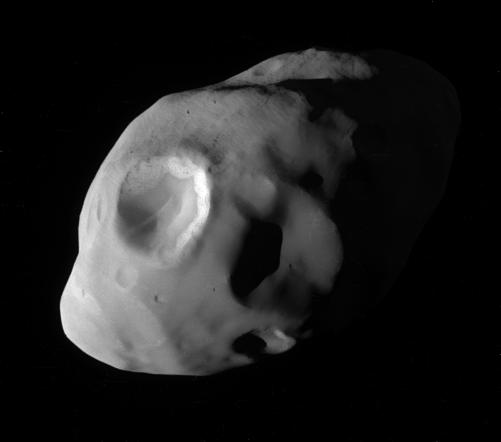
- View of Pandora's western hemisphere. (Note: This view was taken by Cassini, during the spacecraft's close flyby on December 18, 2016. The image was taken from a distance of 40,500 kilometres (25,200 miles); the closest approach by the spacecraft during its 14-year tenure in the Saturn system.)

Discovery
- Discovered by: Stewart A. Collins; D. Carlson; Voyager 1
- Discovery date: October 1980

Designations
- Designation: Saturn XVII
- Pronunciation: /pænˈdɔːrə/
- Named after: Πανδώρα Pandōra
- Adjectives: Pandoran

Orbital characteristics
- Semi-major axis: 141712 km
- Eccentricity: 0.00419
- Orbital period (sidereal): 0.628503 d
- Inclination: 0.050°
- Satellite of: Saturn

Physical characteristics
- Dimensions: 103.0 × 79.0 × 63.0 km (± 0.6 × 0.6 × 0.4 km)
- Mean diameter: 80.0±0.6 km
- Volume: 268990±860 km^{3}
- Mass: (1.357±0.002)×10^{17} kg (Note: Calculated from the standard gravitational parameter GM = (9.058±0.011)×10^{−3} km^{3}·s^{–2} given by Lainey et al. (2023), divided by the gravitational constant G = 6.6743×10^{−2} km^{3}·kg^{–1}·s^{–2}.)
- Mean density: 0.5045±0.0017 g/cm^{3}
- Surface gravity: 0.0022–0.0061 m/s^{2}
- Escape velocity: 0.019 km/s at longest axis to 0.024 km/s at poles
- Synodic rotation period: synchronous
- Axial tilt: assumed zero
- Albedo: 0.99±0.13 (geometric)
- Temperature: ≈ 78 K

Pandora is an inner satellite of Saturn. It was discovered in 1980 from photos taken by the Voyager 1 probe and was provisionally designated S/1980 S 26. In late 1985, it was officially named after Pandora from Greek mythology. It is also designated as Saturn XVII.

Pandora was thought to be an outer shepherd satellite of the F Ring. However, recent studies indicate that it does not play such a role, and that only Prometheus, the inner shepherd, contributes to the confinement of the narrow ring. It is more heavily cratered than nearby Prometheus and has at least two large craters 30 kilometres (19 mi) in diameter. The majority of craters on Pandora are shallow as a result of being filled with debris. Ridges and grooves are also present on the moon's surface.

The orbit of Pandora appears to be chaotic as a consequence of a series of four 118:121 mean-motion resonances with Prometheus. The most appreciable changes in their orbits occur approximately every 6.2 years, when the periapsis of Pandora lines up with the apoapsis of Prometheus and the moons approach to within about 1,400 kilometres (870 mi). Pandora also has a 3:2 mean-motion resonance with Mimas, and also a 21:19 mean-motion resonance with Epimetheus, but only while it is on the outer orbit relative to Janus. No such configuration with Janus exists.

Due to their gravitational interactions with the rings, Prometheus and Pandora are expected to crash into each other or Mimas in the next 20 million years.

From its very low density and relatively high albedo, it seems likely that Pandora is a very porous icy body. However, there is much uncertainty in these values, so this remains to be confirmed.

== Gallery ==
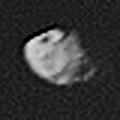
Voyager 2 image of Pandora (August 1981).

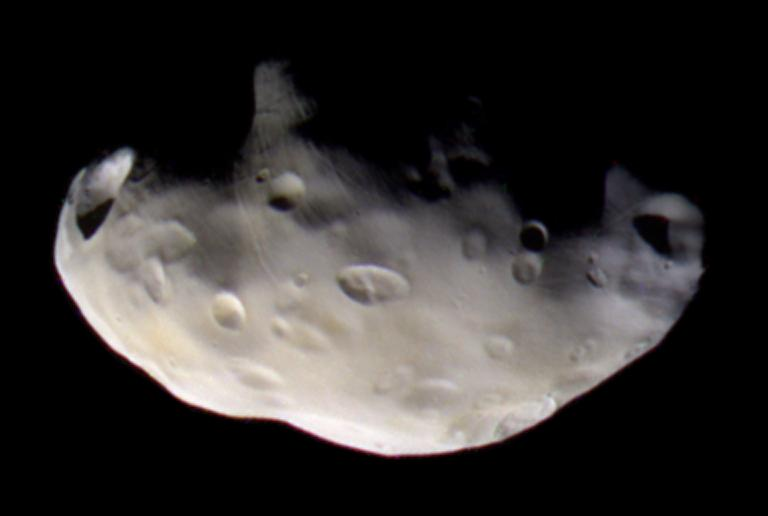
View of the moon, taken during September 2005 flyby by Cassini.

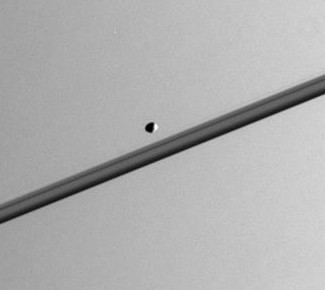
Pandora as seen from the Cassini probe in 2005; the rings of Saturn are in the background.

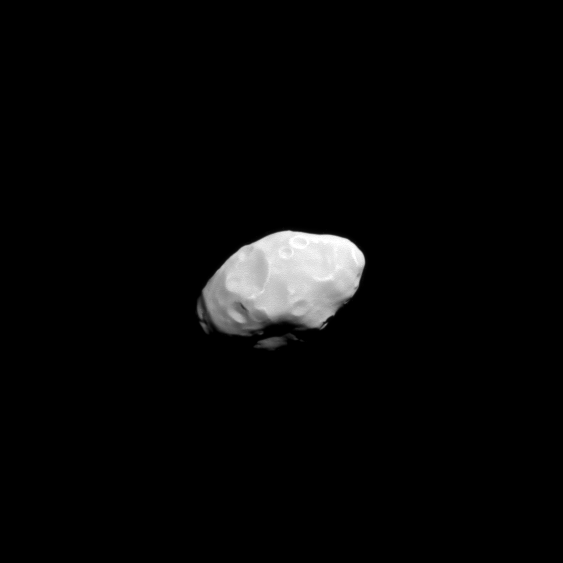
Cassini’s flyby on June 3, 2010.

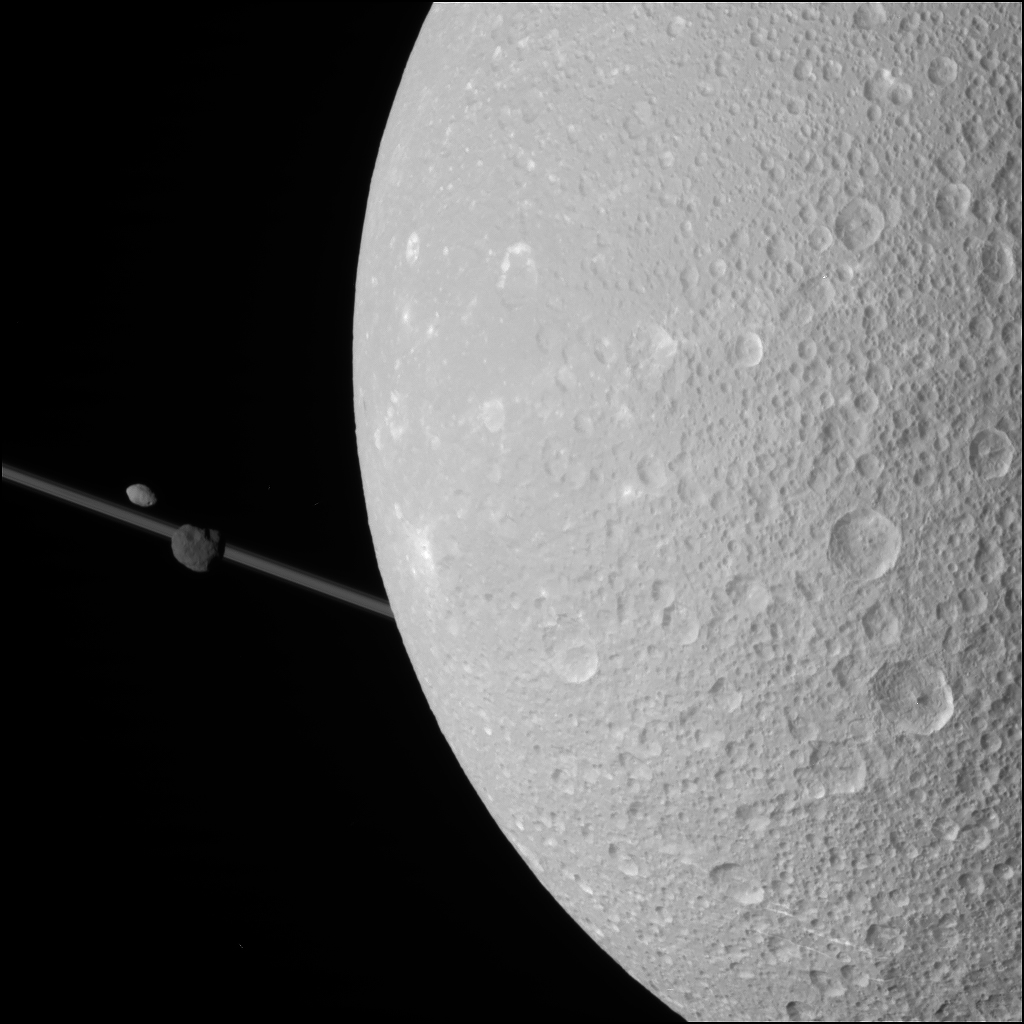
Pandora, Epimetheus and Dione transiting Saturn's Rings in May 2016.

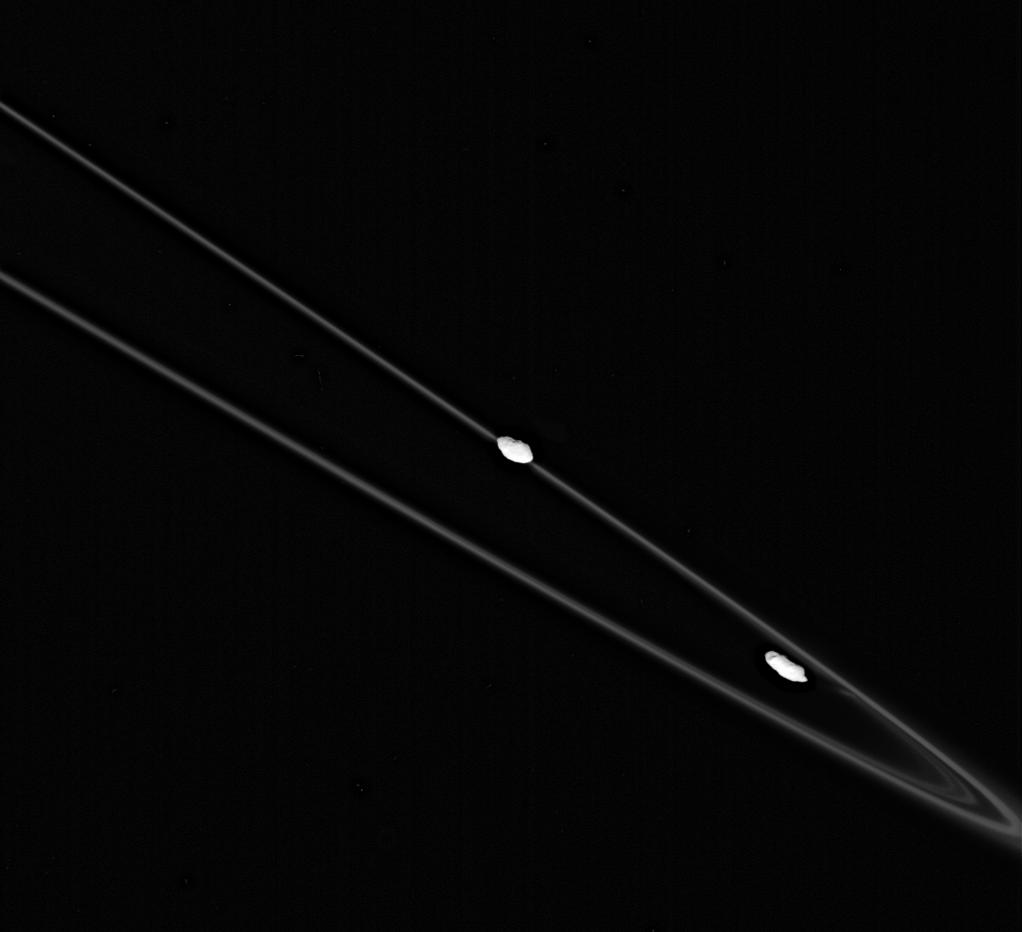
Pandora and Prometheus circling the F ring in October of 2005. Prometheus’ gravitational effects on the particles in the ring is visible here.

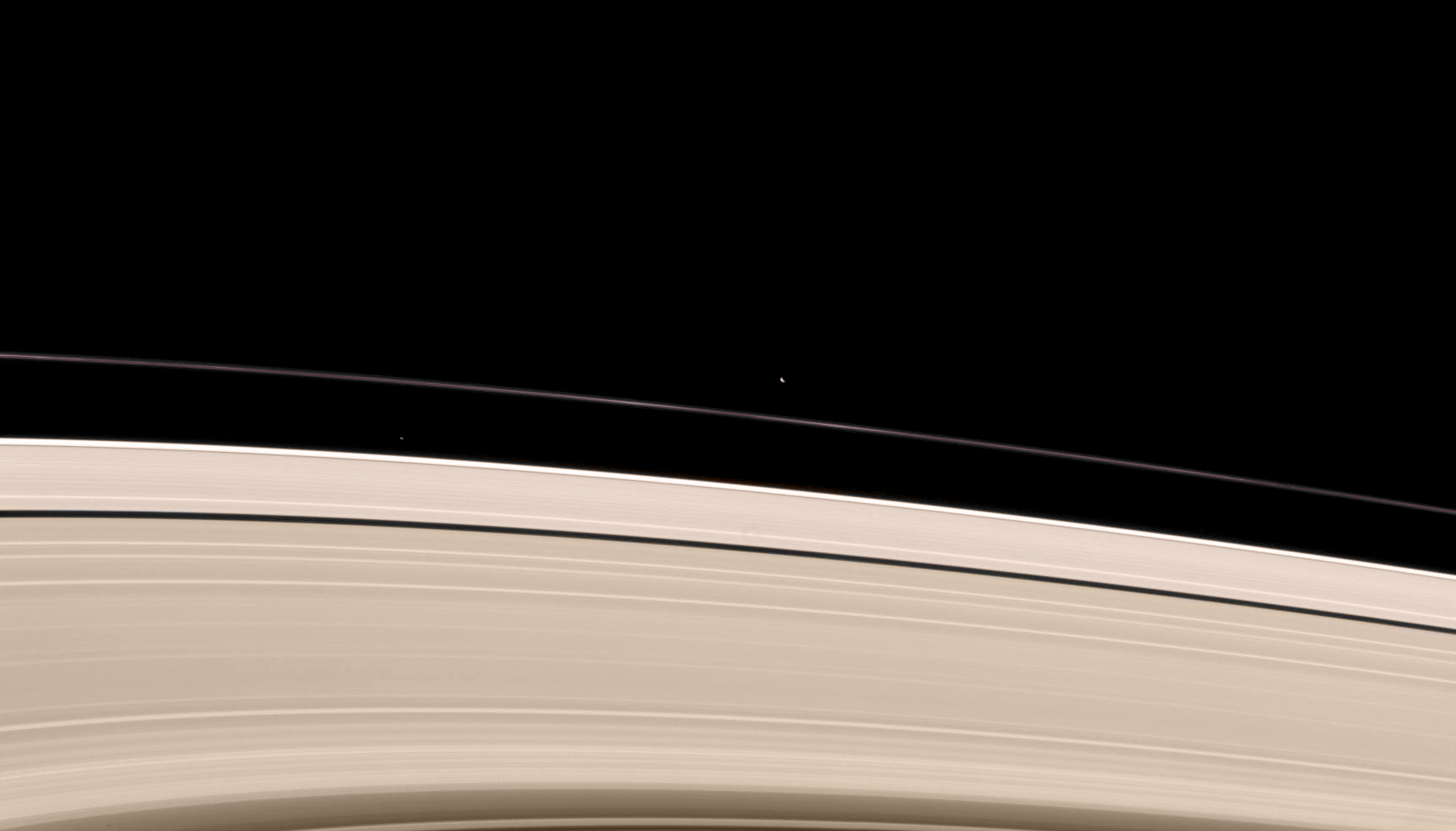
Pandora and Atlas seen together around the F ring in February 2016.
