= Rings of Chariklo =

Ring system around 10199 Chariklo

Apparent brightness measurement by James Webb Space Telescope (JWST) during Chariklo's occultation in 2022

The centaur 10199 Chariklo, with a diameter of about 250 kilometres (160 mi), is the second-smallest celestial object with confirmed rings (with 2060 Chiron being the smallest), and the fifth ringed celestial object discovered in the Solar System, after the gas giants and ice giants. Orbiting Chariklo is a bright ring system consisting of two narrow and dense bands, 6–7 km (4 mi) and 2–4 km (2 mi) wide, separated by a gap of 9 kilometres (6 mi). The rings orbit at distances of about 400 kilometres (250 mi) from the center of Chariklo, a thousandth the distance between Earth and the Moon. The discovery was made by a team of astronomers using ten telescopes at various locations in Argentina, Brazil, Chile and Uruguay in South America during observation of a stellar occultation on 3 June 2013, and was announced on 26 March 2014.

The existence of a ring system around a minor planet was unexpected because it had been thought that rings could only be stable around much more massive bodies. Ring systems around minor bodies had not previously been discovered despite the search for them through direct imaging and stellar occultation techniques. Chariklo's rings should disperse over a period of at most a few million years, so either they are very young, or they are actively contained by shepherd moons with a mass comparable to that of the rings. The team nicknamed the rings Oiapoque (the inner, more substantial ring) and Chuí (the outer ring), after the two rivers that form the northern and southern coastal borders of Brazil. A request for formal names will be submitted to the IAU at a later date.

== Discovery and observations ==
Video showing Chariklo occulting a star on 3 June 2013. A lightcurve plotting the star's brightness over time is shown below.

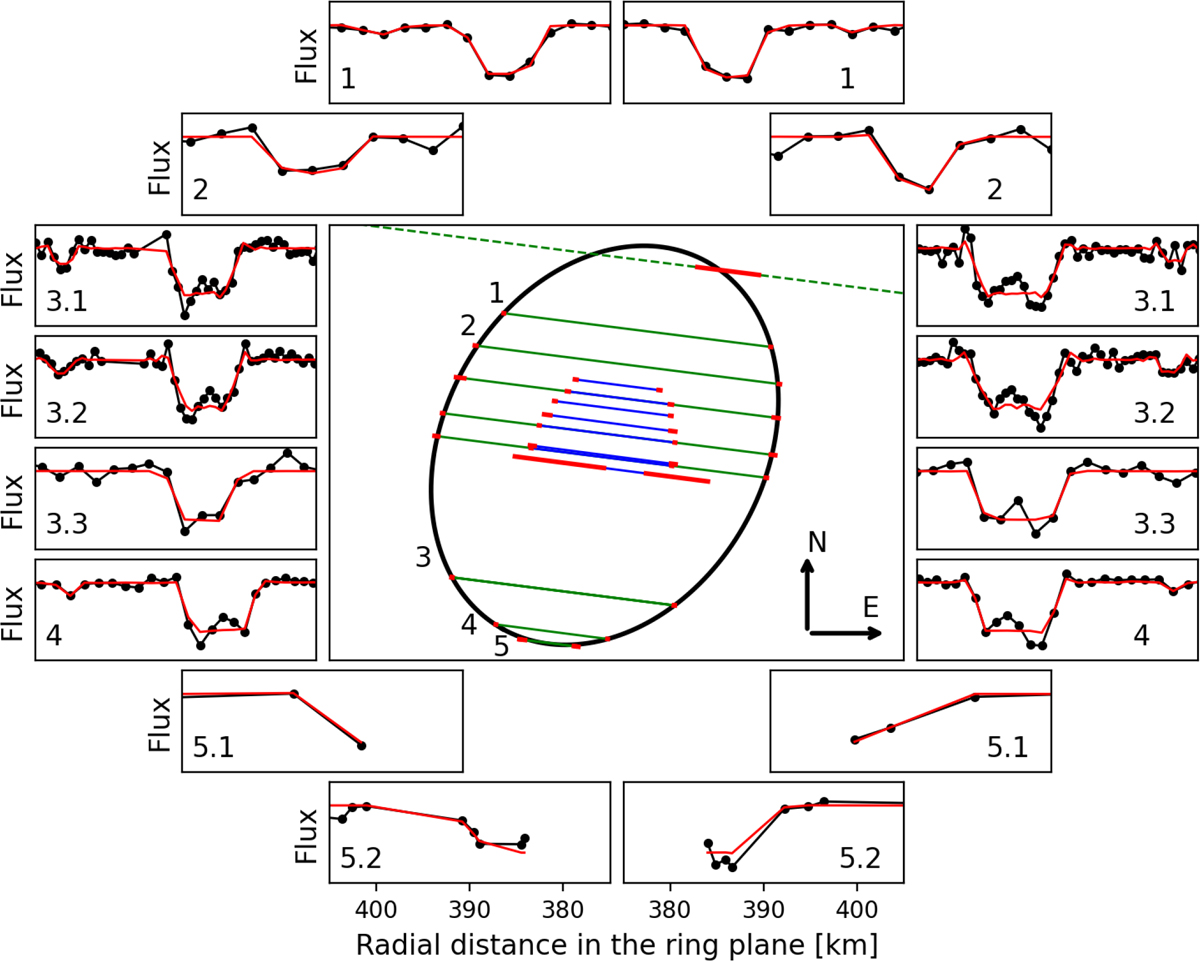
Silhouette of Chariklo and its rings on 23 July 2017, revealed by occultation observations from various locations on Earth

Chariklo is the largest confirmed member of a class of small bodies known as centaurs, which orbit the Sun between Saturn and Uranus in the outer Solar System. Forecasts had shown that, as seen from South America, it would pass in front of the 12.4-magnitude star UCAC4 248-108672, located in the constellation Scorpius, on 3 June 2013.

With the aid of thirteen telescopes located in Argentina, Brazil, Chile, and Uruguay, a team of astronomers led by Felipe Braga Ribas (cite), a post-doctoral astronomer of the National Observatory (ON), in Rio de Janeiro, and 65 other researchers from 34 institutions in 12 countries, was able to observe this occultation event, a phenomenon during which a star disappears behind its occulting body. The 1.54-metre Danish National Telescope at La Silla Observatory, due to the much faster data acquisition rate of its 'Lucky Imager' camera (10 Hz), was the only telescope able to resolve the individual rings.

During this event, the observed brightness was predicted to dip from magnitude 14.7 (star + Chariklo) to 18.5 (Chariklo alone) for at most 19.2 seconds. This increase of 3.8 magnitudes is equivalent to a decrease in brightness by a factor 32.5. The primary occultation event was accompanied by four additional small decreases in the overall intensity of the light curve, which were observed seven seconds before the beginning of the occultation and seven seconds after the end of the occultation. These secondary occultations indicated that something was partially blocking the light of the background star. The symmetry of the secondary occultations and multiple observations of the event in various locations helped reconstruct not only the shape and size of the object, but also the thickness, orientation, and location of the ring planes. The relatively consistent ring properties inferred from several secondary occultation observations discredit alternative explanations for these features, such as cometary-like outgassing.

Telescopes that observed the occultation included the Danish National Telescope and the survey telescope TRAPPIST of La Silla Observatory, the PROMPT Telescopes (Cerro Tololo Inter-American Observatory), the Brazilian Southern Astrophysical Research Telescope or SOAR (Cerro Pachón), the 0.45-metre ASH telescope (Cerro Burek), and those of the State University of Ponta Grossa Observatory, the Polo Astronomical Pole Casimiro Montenegro Filho (at the Itaipu Technological Park Foundation, in Foz do Iguaçu), the Universidad Católica Observatory of the Pontifical Catholic University of Chile (Santa Martina, Chile) and several at Estación Astrofísica de Bosque Alegre, operated by the National University of Córdoba. Negative detections were recorded by El Catalejo Observatory (Santa Rosa, La Pampa, Argentina), the 20-inch Planewave telescope (part of the Searchlight Observatory Network) at San Pedro de Atacama, Chile and the OALM instrument at Los Molinos Astronomical Observatory in Uruguay. Some of the other participating instruments were those at the National Observatory in Rio de Janeiro, the Valongo Observatory (at the Federal University of Rio de Janeiro), the Oeste do Paraná State University Observatory or Unioeste (in the state of Paraná), the Pico dos Dias Observatory or OPL (in Minas Gerais) and the São Paulo State University (UNESP – Guaratinguetá) in São Paulo.

On 18 October 2022, the NIRCam instrument onboard the James Webb Space Telescope (JWST) was used to observe the occultation of the star Gaia DR3 6873519665992128512 by Chariklo's rings, capturing the characteristic dual decrease in the star's brightness as the rings obscured the starlight at two points.

== Properties ==
The orientation of the rings is consistent with an edge-on view from Earth in 2008, explaining the observed dimming of Chariklo between 1997 and 2008 by a factor of 1.75, as well as the gradual disappearance of water ice and other materials from its spectrum as the observed surface area of the rings decreased. Also consistent with this edge-on orientation is that since 2008, the Chariklo system has increased in brightness by a factor of 1.5 again, and the infrared water-ice spectral features have reappeared. This suggests that the rings are composed at least partially of water ice. An icy ring composition is also consistent with the expected density of a disrupted body within Chariklo's Roche limit.

Spectral models indicate that the rings have a composition distinct from that of Chariklo itself. While the rings contain a significant fraction of water ice (up to 20 %) mixed with silicates and organic materials, the surface of Chariklo appears largely devoid of water ice and is dominated by amorphous carbon, silicates, and organics. This supports the interpretation that the observed water-ice spectral signatures originate mainly from the rings

Rings of Chariklo
| Name | Nickname | Orbital radius (km) | Width (km) | Eccentricity | Normal optical depth | Surface density (g/cm^{2}) | Mass-equivalent diameter (km) | Pole direction (RA) | Pole direction (Dec) | Radial separation (km) |
|---|---|---|---|---|---|---|---|---|---|---|
| C1R | Oiapoque | 385.9±0.4 | 4.8 to 9.1 | 0.005 to 0.022 | 0.4 (average) (Note: The edges of the C1R ring are more opaque than the center of the C1R ring.) | 30–100 | ~2 | 151.03°±0.14° | +41.81°±0.07° | 13.9+5.2 −3.4 |
| C2R | Chuí | 399.8±0.6 | 0.1 to 1 | <0.017 | >0.1 | ? | ~1 | 150.91°±0.22° | +41.60°±0.12° | 13.9+5.2 −3.4 |

=== Inner ring (2013C1R or Oiapoque) ===
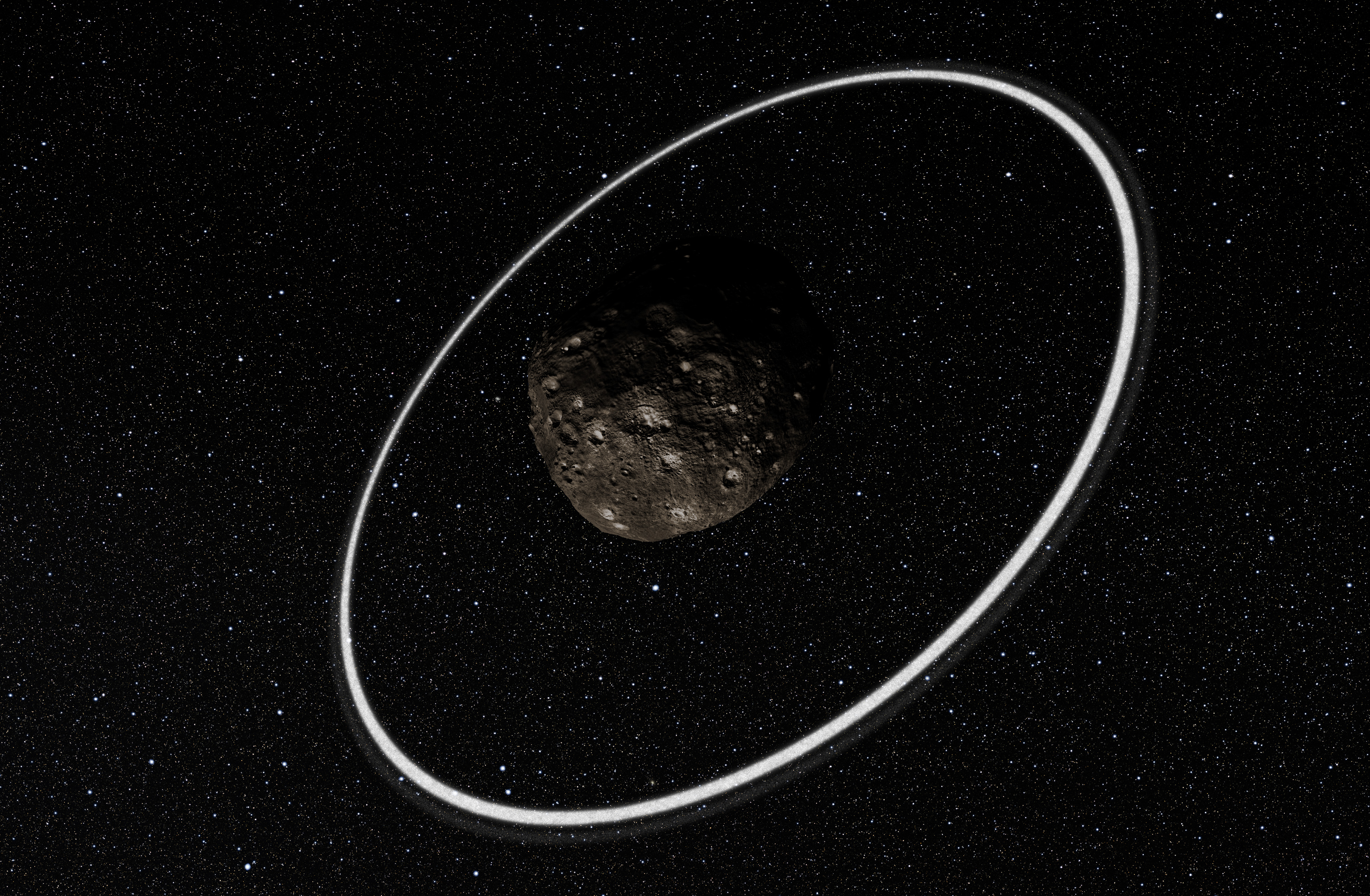
Artist's impression of a ring system around Chariklo

The equivalent depth (a parameter related to the total amount of material contained in the ring based on the viewing geometry) of C1R was observed to vary by 21% over the course of the observation. Similar asymmetries have been observed during occultation observations of Uranus's narrow rings, and may be due to resonant oscillations responsible for modulating the width and optical depth of the rings. The column density of C1R is estimated to be 30–100 g/cm^{2}.

=== Outer ring (2013C2R or Chuí) ===
C2R is half the width of the brighter ring, and resides just outside it, at 404.8 kilometres (251.5 mi). With an optical depth of about 0.06, it is markedly more diffuse than its companion. Altogether, it has approximately a twelfth of the mass of C1R.

== Origin ==
The origin of the rings is unknown, but both are likely to be remnants of a debris disk, which could have formed via an impact on Chariklo, a collision with or between one or more pre-existing moons, tidal disruption of a former retrograde moon, or from material released from the surface by cometary activity or rotational disruption. If the rings formed through an impact event with Chariklo, the object must have impacted at a low velocity to prevent ring particles from being ejected beyond Chariklo's Hill sphere.

Impact velocities in the outer Solar System are typically ≈ 1 km/s (compared with the escape velocity at the surface of Chariklo of ≈ 0.1 km/s), and were even lower before the Kuiper belt was dynamically excited, supporting the possibility that the rings formed in the Kuiper belt before Chariklo was transferred to its current orbit less than 10 Myr ago. Impact velocities in the asteroid belt are much higher (≈ 5 km/s), which could explain the absence of such ring features in minor bodies within the asteroid belt. Collisions between ring particles would cause the ring to widen substantially, and Poynting–Robertson drag would cause the ring particles to fall onto the central body within a few million years, requiring either an active source of ring particles or dynamical confinement by small (kilometre-sized) embedded or shepherd moons yet to be discovered. Such moons would be very challenging to detect via direct imaging from Earth due to the small radial separation of the ring system and Chariklo.

== Simulations ==
As the second-smallest known celestial body with its own ring system, Chariklo and its rings are the first to have been fully simulated by numerically solving the N-body problem. The assumptions made included the minor planet and the ring particles being spherical, and all particles having equal radii between 2.5 and 10 m. Depending on parameters, the simulations involved between 21 million and 345 million particles interacting with each other through gravity and collisions. The goal of the simulations was to assess under what conditions the rings remain stable; that is, do not cluster into few bigger bodies.

The first conclusion coming from the simulations is that the density of Chariklo has to be bigger than that of the ring matter, just in order to maintain them in orbit. Secondarily, for all tested ring particle radii and ring spatial densities, the rings did cluster in relatively short time scales. The authors suggest three main explanations:

1. the ring particles are much smaller, on the order of 1 cm, than assumed in the simulations
2. the rings are very young (below 100 years)
3. there is a relatively massive, undetected as of yet, body in the system, which acts as a shepherd moon

They additionally noted that the effects of some of the assumptions, for instance complete absence of eccentricity of the rings, have not been evaluated.
