= Shepherd moon =

Satellite associated with a planetary ring

Prometheus (right) and Pandora (left) both orbit near Saturn's F ring, but only Prometheus is thought to act as a shepherd.

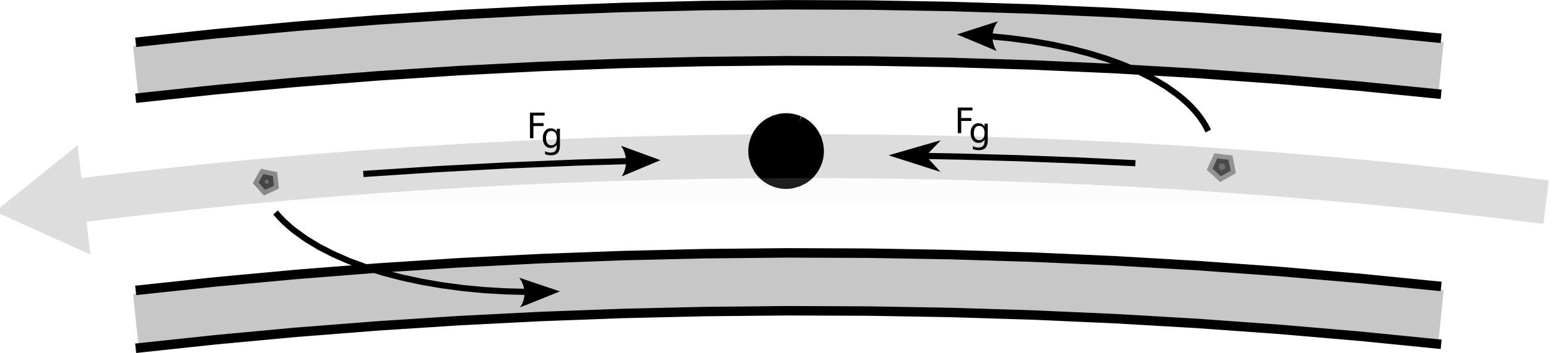
Operation of a shepherd moon– particles are located in front or behind the moon in its orbit, so these are either accelerated in the direction of the moon and thrown to the outside, or they are slowed on their path and pulled inwards.

A shepherd moon is a small natural satellite that clears a gap in planetary ring material or keeps particles within a ring contained. The name is a result of their limiting the "herd" of the ring particles as a shepherd.

Due to their gravitational influence, shepherd moons deflect ring particles from their original orbits due to proximity or through orbital resonances. This can carve gaps in the ring system, such as the Encke Gap maintained by Saturn's moon Pan, or lead to the confining of narrow ringlets, such as Saturn's F ring.

== Discovery ==
The existence of shepherd moons was theorized in early 1979. Observations of the rings of Uranus show that they are very thin and well defined, with sharp gaps between rings. To explain this, Goldreich and Tremaine suggested that two small satellites that were undetected at the time might be confining each ring. The first images of shepherd satellites were taken later that year by Voyager 1.

== Examples ==
=== Jupiter ===
Several of Jupiter's small innermost moons, namely Metis and Adrastea, are within Jupiter's ring system and are also within Jupiter's Roche limit. It is possible that these rings are composed of material that is being pulled off these two bodies by Jupiter's tidal forces, possibly facilitated by impacts of ring material on their surfaces.

=== Saturn ===
The complex ring system of Saturn has several such satellites. These include Prometheus (F ring), Daphnis (Keeler Gap), Pan (Encke Gap), Janus, and Epimetheus (both A ring).

=== Uranus ===
Uranus also has shepherd moons on its ε ring, Cordelia and Ophelia. They are interior and exterior shepherds, respectively. Both moons are well within Uranus's synchronous orbit radius, and their orbits are therefore slowly decaying due to tidal deceleration.

=== Neptune ===
Neptune's rings are very unusual in that they first appeared to be composed of incomplete arcs in Earth-based observations, but Voyager 2's images showed them to be complete rings with bright clumps. It is thought that the gravitational influence of the shepherd moon Galatea and possibly other as-yet undiscovered shepherd moons are responsible for this clumpiness.

=== Minor planets ===
Rings around some centaurs have been identified. Chariklo's rings are remarkably well-defined and are suspected to either be very young or kept in place by a shepherd moon similar in mass to the rings. Chiron is also thought to have rings similar in form to those of Chariklo.

=== Exoplanets ===
A major gap in the circumstellar disk or large ring system of the free-floating brown dwarf or rogue planet J1407b at about 61 million km (0.4 AU) from its center is considered to be indirect evidence of the existence of an exomoon (or exoplanet) with mass up to 0.8 Earth masses.

== See also ==
- Kirkwood gap
- Subsatellite (a moon of a moon)
