= 10199 Chariklo =

Ringed centaur in the outer Solar System

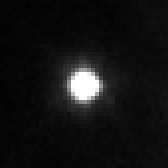
- Chariklo as seen by the Hubble Space Telescope in 7 June 2015.

Discovery
- Discovered by: Spacewatch (Note: The Minor Planet Center lists "Spacewatch" as the discoverer without listing specific people.)
- Discovery site: Kitt Peak Obs.
- Discovery date: 15 February 1997

Designations
- Pronunciation: /ˈkærəkloʊ/
- Named after: Χαρικλώ Khariklō (Ancient Greek nymph)
- Alternative designations: 1997 CU_{26}
- Minor planet category: centaur · distant
- Adjectives: Charikloan, Charikloian /kærəˈkloʊ(i)ən/

Orbital characteristics
- Epoch 5 May 2025 (JD 2460800.5)
- Uncertainty parameter 0
- Observation arc: 36+ yr
- Earliest precovery date: 5 November 1988
- Aphelion: 18.420 AU
- Perihelion: 13.077 AU
- Semi-major axis: 15.748 AU
- Eccentricity: 0.1696
- Orbital period (sidereal): 62.50 yr (22,827 days)
- Mean anomaly: 123.744°
- Mean motion: 0° 0^{m} 56.774^{s} / day
- Inclination: 23.425°
- Longitude of ascending node: 300.470°
- Time of perihelion: 25 June 2066; 17 December 2003 (previous)
- Argument of perihelion: 241.323°
- Saturn MOID: 4.710 AU
- Uranus MOID: 3.186 AU

Physical characteristics
- Dimensions: (287.6+2.8 −3.0) × (270.4+2.8 −5.6) × (198.2+10.8 −5.4) km
- Mean diameter: 249.6+6.0 −4.6 km
- Mass: (5.9–6.9)×10^{18} kg (Note: Chariklo's mass is calculated by multiplying density (ρ; kg/m^{3} units) by ellipsoid volume (V; m^{3} units): $M = \rho V$. Volume of an ellipsoid with semi-axes 143.8 × 135.2 × 99.1 km is approximately $V =$ 8.07×10^{15} m^{3}.)
- Mean density: 0.73–0.85 g/cm^{3}
- Synodic rotation period: 7.004±0.036 h
- North pole right ascension: 151.03°±0.14° (C1R ring)
- North pole declination: +41.81°±0.07° (C1R ring)
- Geometric albedo: 0.037±0.001
- Spectral type: D-type asteroid; BR (TNO color class); B−V = 0.80±0.02; V−R = 0.48±0.01; V−I = 1.01±0.01
- Apparent magnitude: ~19
- Absolute magnitude (H): 6.8–7.3 (Note: The absolute magnitude (H) of Chariklo changes over time due to the changing aspect angle of its rings when viewed from Earth. During the late 1990s and early 2000s, Chariklo appeared brighter (H=6.8) because more of its rings' surface area was visible from Earth. On the other hand, during 2008, Chariklo appeared fainter (H=7.3) because its rings were seen edge-on (minimum visible surface area) from Earth.)

10199 Chariklo (/ˈkærəkloʊ/ KARR-ə-kloh) is a ringed asteroid and centaur in the outer Solar System. It is the largest known centaur, with a diameter of about 250 km (160 mi). It orbits the Sun between Saturn and Uranus with an orbital period of 62.5 years. It was discovered on 15 February 1997 by the University of Arizona's Spacewatch project at Kitt Peak National Observatory. Chariklo has a dark, reddish surface composed of water ice, silicate minerals, amorphous carbon, and various complex organic compounds (also known as tholins).

Chariklo's ring system consists of two narrow rings of icy particles in orbit around the object. The rings of Chariklo were discovered in 2013, when astronomers observed Chariklo occulting or passing in front of a star. Chariklo was the first minor planet discovered to have rings, and as of 2025, it is one of the four minor planets known to have rings (the three others being 2060 Chiron, Haumea, and Quaoar). It is unknown what keeps Chariklo's rings stable, as it has been predicted that they should decay within a few million years. Astronomers have hypothesized that Chariklo's rings might be maintained by the gravitational influence of yet-undiscovered shepherd moons orbiting Chariklo. The origin of Chariklo's rings is uncertain, with various possible explanations including ejection of surface material via outgassing or tidal disruption of a moon around Chariklo.

== Discovery and naming ==
Chariklo was discovered on 15 February 1997 by the University of Arizona's Spacewatch project at Kitt Peak National Observatory. James V. Scotti made the discovery observations using the Spacewatch 0.9-meter telescope, although NASA and the Minor Planet Center (MPC) do not mention him as the official discoverer. Other observatories from Canada, Czech Republic, and China continued observing Chariklo until the discovery was announced by the MPC on 24 February 1997. The MPC gave the provisional designation 1997 CU_{26} to the object. Chariklo was the seventh centaur discovered. (Note: The six centaurs discovered before Chariklo are: 2060 Chiron (1977 UB), 5145 Pholus (1992 AD), 7066 Nessus (1993 HA_{2}), 1994 TA, 10370 Hylonome (1995 DW_{2}), and 8405 Asbolus (1995 GO).)

Within a year after Chariklo was discovered, astronomers observed the object in detail to characterize its properties, including its color, size, and surface composition. On 2 March 1999, the MPC gave Chariklo its minor planet catalog number of 10199. Chariklo was officially named on 28 September 1999.

This minor planet is named after the nymph Chariclo (Χαρικλώ), the wife of Chiron in Greek mythology. Chariclo has sometimes been characterized as a sea nymph, female centaur, or the mother of the blind prophet Tiresias. An astrological symbol for Chariklo,, was devised in the late 1990s by German astrologer Robert von Heeren. Chariklo's symbol was derived from the astrological symbol used for the centaur 2060 Chiron,, where the letter C replaces the letter K.

== Orbit ==
Chariklo orbits the Sun between Saturn and Uranus with an average orbital distance of 15.7 astronomical units (AU) and an orbital period of 62.5 years. It follows an inclined and elliptical orbit that brings it within 13.1 AU from the Sun at perihelion to as far as 18.4 AU at aphelion. Chariklo is close to, but not in a 4:3 orbital resonance with Uranus; its mean orbital distance lies within 0.09 AU from the resonance.

Chariklo is classified as a centaur, a type of small Solar System body generally (Note: There is no universally agreed definition of a centaur, as different researchers have argued for using different criteria (see Centaur (small Solar System body)#Discrepant criteria). Regardless, centaurs are broadly cited as orbiting between Jupiter and Neptune.) defined as orbiting between Jupiter and Neptune. Centaurs, which share characteristics of both asteroids and comets, are thought to have originated from the Kuiper belt and the scattered disc beyond Neptune. The centaurs are strongly influenced by the gravity of the giant planets, which leads to chaotic or unpredictable changes in their orbits. Such changes can lead to centaurs escaping their orbital region by either getting ejected from the Solar System, impacting a planet, or becoming a short-period comet whose orbit enters the inner Solar System.

Compared to other centaurs, Chariklo's orbit is relatively more stable with a 50% chance of escaping the centaur region 7 or 10.3 million years in the future. (Note: The times given here are the "dyanamical half-lives", which is the time interval at which 50% of copies ("clones") of an object (in this case, Chariklo) are lost in an orbit simulation.) Chariklo's orbital evolution is primarily influenced by Uranus; simulations predict that Chariklo will frequently make close approaches to Uranus during the next 100 million years. However, Chariklo's less frequent future encounters with Jupiter and Saturn will have greater effects on its orbit and can potentially disrupt Chariklo's ring system.

Simulations show that there is a 99% chance that Chariklo was implanted in the centaur region sometime in the past 20 million years. There is a 50% chance that Chariklo could have been implanted as recently as 9.38 million years ago. A 2016 study suggested that Jupiter and Saturn were responsible for transferring Chariklo to the centaur region, whereas a 2017 study suggested Neptune was more likely responsible.

Animated diagram of Chariklo's orbit with the giant planets Sun · Jupiter · Saturn · Uranus · 10199 Chariklo

== Observation ==
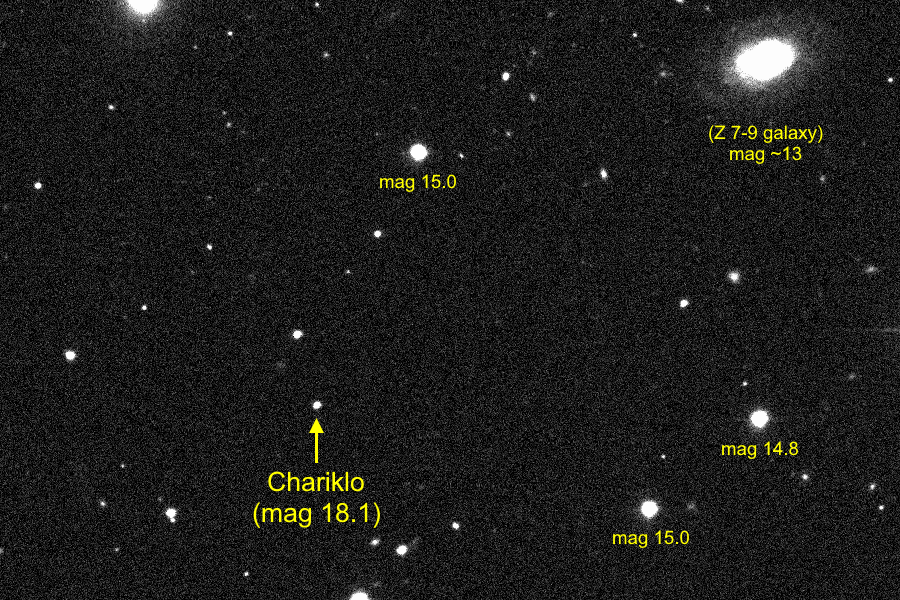
Telescope image of Chariklo from the Sloan Digital Sky Survey, taken on 5 May 2000. Bright stars and galaxies are labeled with their apparent magnitudes.

James Webb Space Telescope video of Chariklo (moving dot) occulting a star (center) on 18 October 2022

Chariklo's brightness or apparent magnitude lies between 17 and 19, depending on its distance from Earth. Chariklo appeared brightest from Earth in 2003 when it was simultaneously at perihelion and opposition. Independent of distance, Chariklo's intrinsic brightness or absolute magnitude (H) changes over time due to the changing viewing angle of Chariklo's rings as seen from Earth. During the late 1990s and early 2000s, Chariklo appeared brighter (H=6.8) because more of its rings' surface area was visible from Earth. On the other hand, during 2008, Chariklo appeared fainter (H=7.3) because its rings were seen edge-on (minimum visible surface area) from Earth.

Chariklo and its rings are too small and too far away to be resolved by current telescopes. Chariklo's rings span an angular diameter of 80 milliarcseconds in the sky, close to the diffraction limit of some of the highest-resolution telescopes like the Hubble Space Telescope. These telescopes have not been able to detect Chariklo's rings through direct imaging. Chariklo's rings may be imageable in the future with even larger telescopes such as the Extremely Large Telescope.

During 2013 to 2022, Chariklo was passing in front of the Galactic Center in the sky. Because the Galactic Center is densely packed with stars, this meant Chariklo would occult or pass in front of multiple stars. Stellar occultations allow for accurate measurements of a Solar System object's position, size, shape, and surrounding features (i.e. moons and rings) at kilometre-scale resolutions. Chariklo was first observed via stellar occultation on 3 June 2013, which resulted in the discovery of Chariklo's rings. Between 2014 and 2022, about twenty observing campaigns were organized by astronomers to observe predicted occultations by Chariklo. These campaigns involved international collaboration between professional and amateur astronomers.

== Physical characteristics ==
=== Size, shape, and mass ===
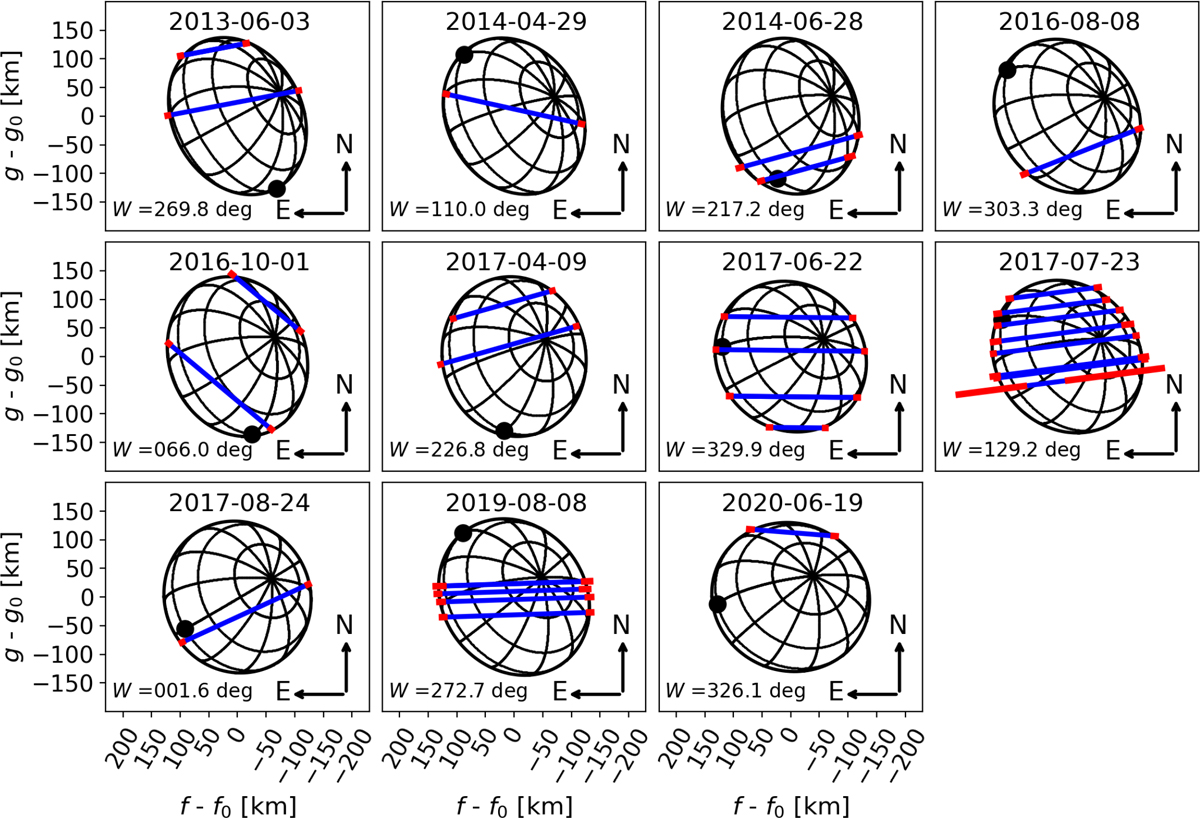
Chariklo's ellipsoidal shape as seen in various stellar occultations from 2013 to 2020

Comparison of sizes, albedos, and colors of various large centaurs with measured diameters. Chariklo is at the left in the top row.

Multiple years of occultation observations show that Chariklo is a flattened or elongated body with dimensions of approximately 288 km × 270 km × 198 km (179 mi × 168 mi × 123 mi). The volume-equivalent mean diameter of Chariklo is about 250 km (160 mi). This makes Chariklo the largest known centaur.

Chariklo's shape is consistent with a triaxial ellipsoid, although slight differences between occultation measurements hint at topographic variation or irregularities in its shape. Chariklo's topographic deviations from an ellipsoid may be as low as −5.52 km (−3.43 mi) to as high as 7.78 km (4.83 mi) (standard deviation 4.11 km or 2.55 mi). The amount of topographic variation seen in Chariklo is similar to those seen in Saturn's small icy moons Phoebe and Hyperion. Simulations of Chariklo's rings predict that ring particles can fall and accumulate on Chariklo's equator to form an equatorial ridge, similar to that on Saturn's moon Iapetus.

Chariklo's dimensions and rotation period suggest it is not in hydrostatic equilibrium. Although Chariklo's mass and density have not been measured due to its lack of known moons, a range of possible masses and densities can be estimated by assuming Chariklo's rings are in a 1:3 spin-orbit resonance with Chariklo's rotation, similar to other ringed minor planets. This gives a density range of 0.73–0.85 g/cm^{3}, which is expected for an icy body. This density range corresponds to a mass range of (5.9–6.9)×10^{18} kg for Chariklo. If Chariklo was in hydrostatic equilibrium, it should have a density between 0.8–1.25 g/cm^{3} and a mass between (6–8)×10^{18} kg, depending on its dimensions.

=== Rotation ===
Chariklo has a synodic rotation period of 7.004 hours, with an uncertainty of 0.036 hours (2.2 minutes). Due to Chariklo's elongated shape, its apparent brightness from Earth changes as it rotates, although the amount of change depends on the viewing angle of Chariklo as seen from Earth. Chariklo's brightness can vary as much as 0.13 magnitudes when looking at its equator, whereas its brightness changes may be undetectable when looking at its poles. Astronomers first attempted to measure Chariklo's rotation period in 1997, but were unable to detect any brightness changes since Chariklo was viewed pole-on from Earth at the time. It was not until 2013 that astronomers were able to measure Chariklo's rotation period.

If Chariklo's rotation is aligned with its rings, then its rotational north pole would point in the direction (RA, Dec) = (151.0°, +41.8°). This translates to ecliptic coordinates (λ, β) = (137.6°, +27.9°), which means Chariklo's axial tilt is 62.1° with respect to the ecliptic. (Note: The axial tilt or obliquity i is given by: $i = 90 -\beta$. β is the ecliptic latitude of Chariklo's north pole direction, in degrees.)

=== Surface composition and spectrum ===
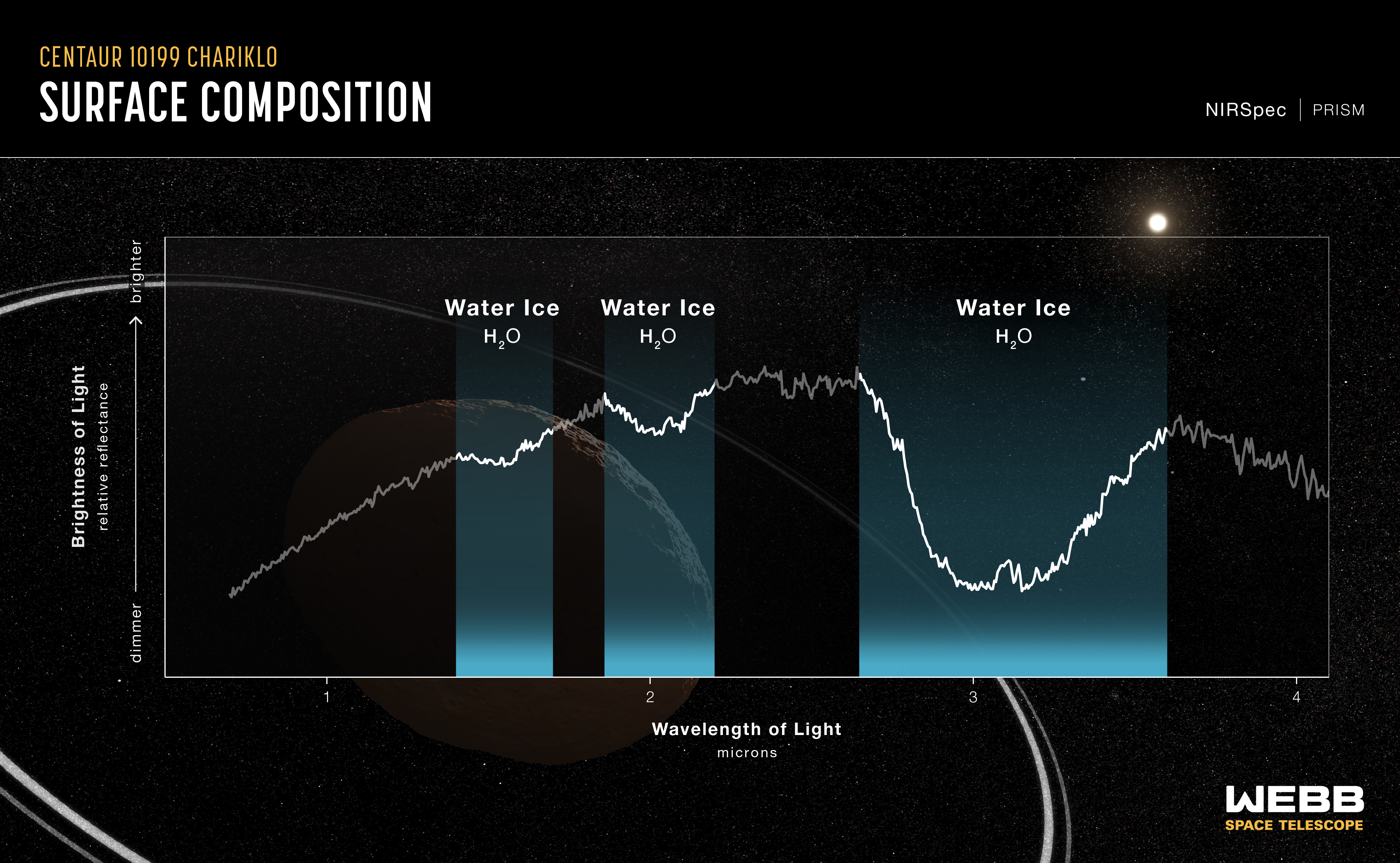
The near-infrared spectrum of Chariklo shows several dips or absorption bands (highlighted in blue) that indicate the presence of water ice on its surface.

The surface of Chariklo is dark and reddish with a low geometric albedo of 3.7%. In visible light, the reflectance spectrum of Chariklo appears featureless, lacking clear absorption features associated with compounds on its surface. These characteristics led astronomers to classify Chariklo as a D-type asteroid. Astronomers have also classified Chariklo as part of the BR class of centaurs and trans-Neptunian objects, whose colors are considered intermediate between "spectrally neutral" (gray) and "red".

In near-infrared wavelengths, Chariklo's spectrum shows several absorption features that suggest its surface is composed of water ice, silicate minerals, amorphous carbon, and various complex organic compounds (also known as tholins). Spectroscopic observations over different years have shown varying levels of water ice in Chariklo's near-infrared spectrum, which astronomers attribute to the changing viewing angle of Chariklo's water ice-rich rings. Near-infrared spectroscopy by the James Webb Space Telescope in 2022 has shown that Chariklo's surface contains water ice in crystalline form, contrary to initial beliefs that all water ice was concentrated in Chariklo's rings. Crystalline water ice is expected to be short-lived in space due to irradiation by high-energy particles, so astronomers hypothesize that Chariklo experiences continuous micro-impacts that either expose pristine material or trigger crystallization processes.

=== No cometary activity ===
Chariklo does not appear to exbibit cometary activity, unlike the other ringed centaur 2060 Chiron. A 2014 analysis of Chariklo's appearance in high-resolution telescope images from 2007–2013 found no evidence of a dust coma surrounding Chariklo, placing an upper limit dust production rate of 2.5 kg/s. Likewise, observations by the Very Large Telescope and Hubble Space Telescope in 2015 found no signs of cometary jets or dust beyond 300 km (190 mi) from Chariklo. Chariklo is likely too cold and too far away from the Sun to exhibit cometary activity today. However, the unstable nature of Chariklo's orbit suggests it is possible that it could have orbited closer to the Sun, meaning Chariklo could have been warmer and active in the past.

== Rings ==
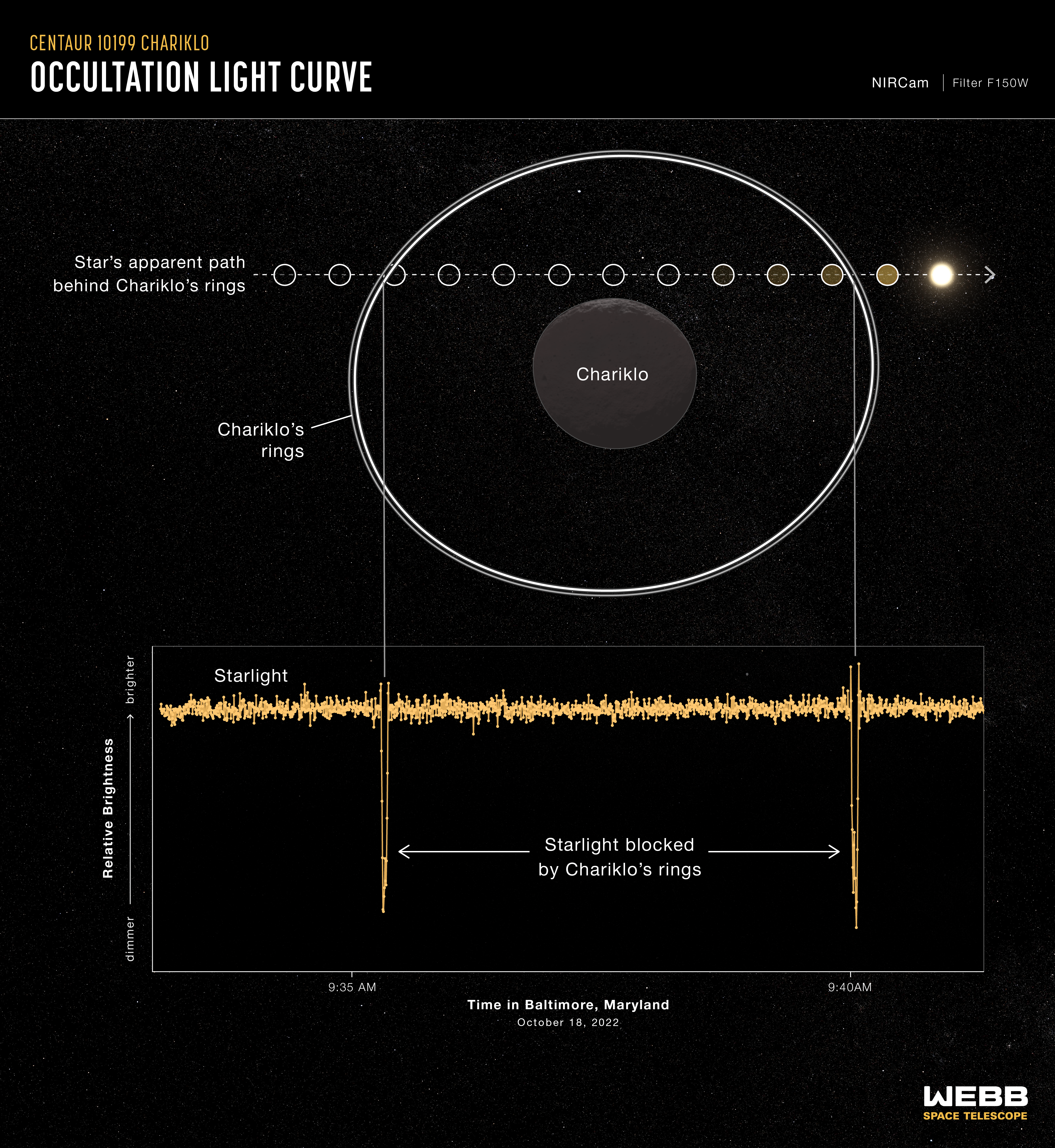
An infographic illustrating how Chariklo's rings are detected during a stellar occultation. As Chariklo and its rings pass in front of the star, the star briefly dims. A light curve plotting the star's brightness over time is shown below to visualize the occultation.

A stellar occultation in 2013 revealed that Chariklo has two rings with radii 386 and 400 km and widths of about 6.9 km and 0.12 km respectively. The rings are approximately 14 km apart. This makes Chariklo the second smallest known object to have rings after its fellow centaur Chiron. These rings are consistent with an edge-on orientation in 2008, which can explain Chariklo's dimming before 2008 and brightening since. Nonetheless, the elongated shape of Chariklo explains most of the brightness variability resulting in darker rings than previously determined. Furthermore, the rings can explain the gradual disappearance of the water-ice features in Chariklo's spectrum before 2008 and their reappearance thereafter if the water ice is in Chariklo's rings.

The existence of a ring system around a minor planet was unexpected because it had been thought that rings could only be stable around much more massive bodies. Ring systems around minor bodies had not previously been discovered despite the search for them through direct imaging and stellar occultation techniques. Chariklo's rings should disperse over a period of at most a few million years, so either they are very young, or they are actively contained by shepherd moons with a mass comparable to that of the rings. However, other research suggests that Chariklo's elongated shape combined with its fast rotation can clear material in an equatorial disk through Lindblad resonances and explain the survival and location of the rings, a mechanism valid also for the ring of Haumea.

The team nicknamed the rings Oiapoque (the inner, more substantial ring) and Chuí (the outer ring), after the two rivers that form the northern and southern coastal borders of Brazil. A request for formal names will be submitted to the IAU at a later date.

It has been confirmed that Chiron may have a similar pair of rings.

Rings of Chariklo
Name	Nickname	Orbital radius (km)	Width (km)	Eccentricity	Normal optical depth	Surface density (g/cm^{2})	Mass-equivalent diameter (km)	Pole direction (RA)	Pole direction (Dec)	Radial separation (km)
C1R	Oiapoque	385.9±0.4	4.8 to 9.1	0.005 to 0.022	0.4 (average) (Note: The edges of the C1R ring are more opaque than the center of the C1R ring.)	30–100	~2	151.03°±0.14°	+41.81°±0.07°	13.9+5.2 −3.4
C2R	Chuí	399.8±0.6	0.1 to 1	<0.017	>0.1	?	~1	150.91°±0.22°	+41.60°±0.12°	13.9+5.2 −3.4

== Exploration ==
Camilla is a mission concept published in June 2018 that would launch a robotic probe to perform a single flyby of Chariklo and drop off a 100 kg (220 lb) impactor made of tungsten to excavate a crater approximately 10 m (33 ft) deep for remote compositional analysis during the flyby. The mission would be designed to fit under the cost cap of NASA's New Frontiers program, although it has not been formally proposed to compete for funding. The spacecraft would be launched in September 2026, using one gravity assist from Venus in February 2027 and Earth in December 2027 and 2029 to accelerate it out toward Jupiter.

== See also ==
- List of centaurs (small Solar System bodies) § 10199
- 2060 Chiron, a large ringed centaur exhibiting cometary activity
- (523727) 2014 NW65, a centaur possibly as large as Chariklo
