= 2060 Chiron =

Ringed centaur and comet

2060 Chiron 95P/Chiron
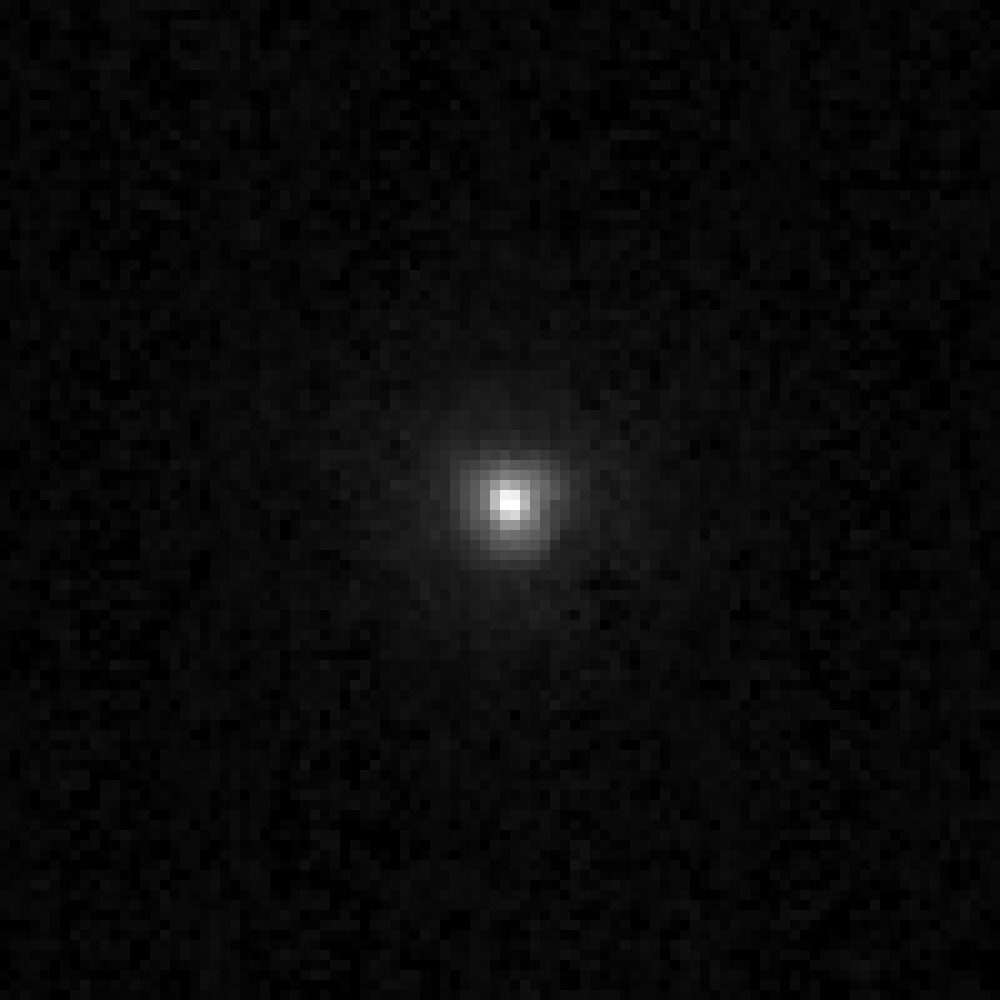
- Hubble Space Telescope image of Chiron and its coma, taken in 1996

Discovery
- Discovered by: Charles Kowal
- Discovery site: Palomar Observatory
- Discovery date: 1 November 1977

Designations
- Pronunciation: /ˈkaɪrɒn/
- Named after: Chiron (Greek mythology)
- Alternative designations: 1977 UB; OK (Object Kowal)
- Minor planet category: centaur; comet; distant
- Adjectives: Chironian; Chironean; (both /kaɪˈroʊniən/)
- Symbol: (astrological)

Orbital characteristics
- Epoch 2021-Jul-01 (JD 2,459,396.5)
- Uncertainty parameter 0
- Observation arc: 126.29 yr
- Earliest precovery date: 24 April 1895 (Harvard Observatory)
- Aphelion: 18.87 AU (2.8 billion km) (occurred May 2021)
- Perihelion: 8.533 AU (1.3 billion km)
- Semi-major axis: 13.70 AU (2.0 billion km)
- Eccentricity: 0.3772
- Orbital period (sidereal): 50.71 yr (18,523 days)
- Average orbital speed: 7.75 km/s
- Mean anomaly: 180.70°
- Mean motion: 0° 1^{m} 10.2^{s} / day
- Inclination: 6.9299°
- Longitude of ascending node: 209.27°
- Time of perihelion: 3 August 2046; 14 February 1996 (previous); 29 August 1945; 16 March 1895
- Argument of perihelion: 339.71°
- Jupiter MOID: 3.1 AU (460 million km)
- Saturn MOID: 0.48 AU (72 million km)
- Uranus MOID: 1.4 AU (210 million km)
- T_{Jupiter}: 3.363

Physical characteristics
- Dimensions: 252 × 218 × 136 km ± (44 × 38 × 24 km)
- Mean diameter: 196±34 km
- Mass: (4.8±2.3)×10^{18} kg
- Mean density: 1.119±0.004 g/cm^{3}
- Synodic rotation period: 5.918 h
- Geometric albedo: 0.057 (assumed); 0.15±0.03; 0.160±0.030
- Spectral type: B (Tholen), Cb (SMASS), Double-Dip type (DiSCo-Webb); B–V = 0.704±0.024; U–B = 0.283±0.060; BB; C
- Apparent magnitude: 18.93; 14.6 (Perihelic opposition)
- Absolute magnitude (H): 5.80±0.27; 5.82±0.07; 5.83; 5.92±0.20; 6.287±0.022 (R); 6.56; 6.79
- Angular diameter: 0.035" (max)

2060 Chiron is a ringed small Solar System body in the outer Solar System, orbiting the Sun between Saturn and Uranus. Discovered in 1977 by Charles Kowal, it was the first-identified member of a new class of objects now known as centaurs—bodies orbiting between the asteroid belt and the Kuiper belt. (Note: 944 Hidalgo, discovered in 1920, also fits this definition, but was not identified as belonging to a distinct population.) Chiron is named after the centaur Chiron in Greek mythology.

Although it was initially called an asteroid and classified only as a minor planet with the designation "2060 Chiron", in 1989 it was found to exhibit behavior typical of a comet. Today it is classified as both a minor planet and a comet, and is accordingly also known by the cometary designation 95P/Chiron. More recently, a series of occultation events through the 2010s and early 2020s revealed that Chiron hosts rings, making it one of four minor planets known to have rings (the three others being 10199 Chariklo, Haumea, and Quaoar) and the only known comet to do so.

== History ==
=== Discovery ===
Chiron was discovered on 1 November 1977 by Charles Kowal from images taken on 18 October at Palomar Observatory. It was given the temporary designation of 1977 UB. It was found near aphelion and at the time of discovery it was the most distant-known minor planet. (Note: Pluto, now considered to be a dwarf planet and hence a minor planet, was known at the time, but was considered a planet.) Chiron was even claimed as the tenth planet by the press. Chiron was later found on several precovery images, going back to 1895, which allowed its orbit to be accurately determined. It had been at perihelion in 1945 but was not discovered then because there were few searches being made at that time, and these were not sensitive to slow-moving objects. The Lowell Observatory's survey for distant planets would not have gone down faint enough in the 1930s and did not cover the right region of the sky in the 1940s. The April 1895 precovery image was one month after the March 1895 perihelion.

=== Naming ===
This minor planet was named after Chiron, a half-human, half-horse centaur from Greek mythology. Son of the Titan Cronus and the nymph Philyra, Chiron was the wisest and most just of all centaurs, serving as an instructor of the Greek heroes. The official naming citation was published by the Minor Planet Center on 1 April 1978 (M.P.C. 4359). It was suggested that the names of other centaurs be reserved for objects of the same type.

Chiron, along with most major and minor planetary bodies, is not generally given a symbol in astronomy. A symbol,, was devised for it by Al H. Morrison and is mostly used among astrologers: it resembles a key as well as an OK monogram for Object Kowal.

== Orbit ==
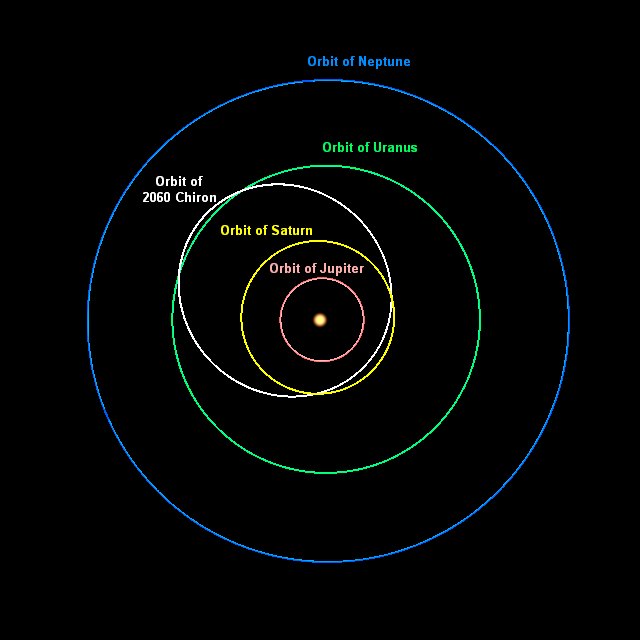
Orbital diagram of Chiron

Chiron's orbit was found to be highly eccentric (0.37), with perihelion just inside the orbit of Saturn and aphelion just outside the perihelion of Uranus (it does not reach the average distance of Uranus, however). According to the program Solex, Chiron's closest approach to Saturn in modern times was around May 720, when it came within 30.5±2.0 million km (0.204 ± 0.013 AU) of the planet. During this passage Saturn's gravity caused Chiron's semi-major axis to decrease from 14.55±0.12 AU to 13.7 AU. Chiron's orbit does not intersect Uranus' orbit.

Chiron attracted considerable interest because it was the first object discovered in such an orbit, well outside the asteroid belt. Chiron is classified as a centaur, the first of a class of objects orbiting between the outer planets. Chiron is a Saturn–Uranus object because its perihelion lies in Saturn's zone of control and its aphelion lies in that of Uranus. Centaurs are not in stable orbits and will be removed by gravitational perturbation by the giant planets over a period of millions of years, moving to different orbits or leaving the Solar System altogether. Chiron likely comes from the Kuiper belt and will probably become a short-period comet in about a million years. Chiron came to perihelion (closest point to the Sun) in 1996 and aphelion in May 2021.

== Physical characteristics ==
=== Spectral type ===
The visible and near-infrared spectrum of Chiron is neutral, and is similar to that of C-type asteroids and the nucleus of Halley's Comet. The near-infrared spectrum of Chiron shows absence of water ice. The infrared spectrum, however, from 0.97 to 5.27 μm, as revealed by the James Webb Space Telescope reveals the presence of gas in the coma and a diverse inventory of ices, on the surface or in the coma. Absorption bands of carbon dioxide, carbon monoxide, ethane, propane, and acetylene were detected, together with water ice in its amorphous state. In addition, irradiation byproducts of methane, carbon dioxide, and carbon monoxide were detected under both reducing (e.g., ethane) and oxidizing (e.g., CO_{3}) conditions; however, complex carbon-bearing molecules resulting from the combined irradiation of –CH– and –CO– groups (such as H_{2}CO, CH_{3}CHO, or CH_{3}COOH) were not observed, which may indicate a physical or temporal segregation of the methane and carbon dioxide reservoirs. A key finding was the detection of fluorescent methane emissions, providing the first evidence of a gas coma rich in this compound. Gaseous carbon dioxide emission was also identified in the fundamental stretching band at 4.27 μm. The authors argue that the presence of methane emission is the first proof of the desorption of methane due to a density phase transition of amorphous water ice at low temperature (61 K) previously studied in the laboratory.

=== Rotation period ===
Four rotational light curves of Chiron were taken from photometric observations between 1989 and 1997. Lightcurve analysis gave a concurring, well-defined rotational period of 5.918 hours with a small brightness variation of 0.05 to 0.09 magnitude, which indicates that the body has a rather spheroidal shape (U=3/3/3).

=== Diameter ===
Comparison of sizes, albedos, and colors of various large centaurs with measured diameters. Chiron is at the center in the top row.

Summary – size estimates for Chiron:
Year	Diameter	Notes	Refs
1984	180 km	Lebofsky (1984)	
1991	186 km	IRAS	
1994	188 km	Campins (radius 94±6 km)	
1996	180 km	occultation	
1998	166 km	Dunham occultation list (Dunham 1998)	
2007	233 km	Spitzer Space Telescope	
2013	218 km	Herschel Space Observatory (PACS and SPIRE)	
2017	271 km	LCDB	
2023	196 km	Sickafoose	

The assumed size of an object depends on its absolute magnitude (H) and the albedo (the amount of light it reflects). In 1984 Lebofsky estimated Chiron to be about 180 km in diameter. Estimates in the 1990s were closer to 150 km in diameter. Occultation data from 1993 suggests a diameter of about 180 km. Combined data from the Spitzer Space Telescope in 2007 and the Herschel Space Observatory in 2011 suggests that Chiron is 218±20 km in diameter. Therefore, Chiron may be as large as 10199 Chariklo. The diameter of Chiron is difficult to estimate in part because the true absolute magnitude of its nucleus is uncertain due to its highly variable cometary activity.

=== Cometary behavior ===
In February 1988, at 12 AU from the Sun, Chiron brightened by 75 percent. This is behavior typical of comets but not asteroids. Further observations in April 1989 showed that Chiron had developed a cometary coma, A tail was detected in 1993. Chiron differs from other comets in that water is not a major component of its coma, because it is too far from the Sun for water to sublimate. In 1995 carbon monoxide was detected in Chiron in very small amounts, and the derived CO production rate was calculated to be sufficient to account for the observed coma. Cyanide was also detected in the spectrum of Chiron in 1991. At the time of its discovery, Chiron was close to aphelion, whereas the observations showing a coma were done closer to perihelion, perhaps explaining why no cometary behavior had been seen earlier. The fact that Chiron is still active probably means it has not been in its current orbit very long.

Chiron is officially designated as both a comet—95P/Chiron—and a minor planet, an indication of the sometimes fuzzy dividing line between the two classes of object. The term proto-comet has also been used. Being about 220 km in diameter, it is unusually large for a comet nucleus. Chiron was the first member of a new family of Chiron-type comets (CTC) with (T_{Jupiter} > 3; a > a_{Jupiter}). Other CTCs include: 39P/Oterma, 165P/LINEAR, 166P/NEAT, and 167P/CINEOS. There are also non-centaur asteroids that are simultaneously classified as comets, such as 4015 Wilson–Harrington, 7968 Elst–Pizarro, and 118401 LINEAR.

Since the discovery of Chiron, other centaurs have been discovered, and nearly all are currently classified as minor planets, but are being observed for possible cometary behavior. 60558 Echeclus has displayed a cometary coma and now also has the cometary designation 174P/Echeclus. After passing perihelion in early 2008, 52872 Okyrhoe significantly brightened.

== Rings ==
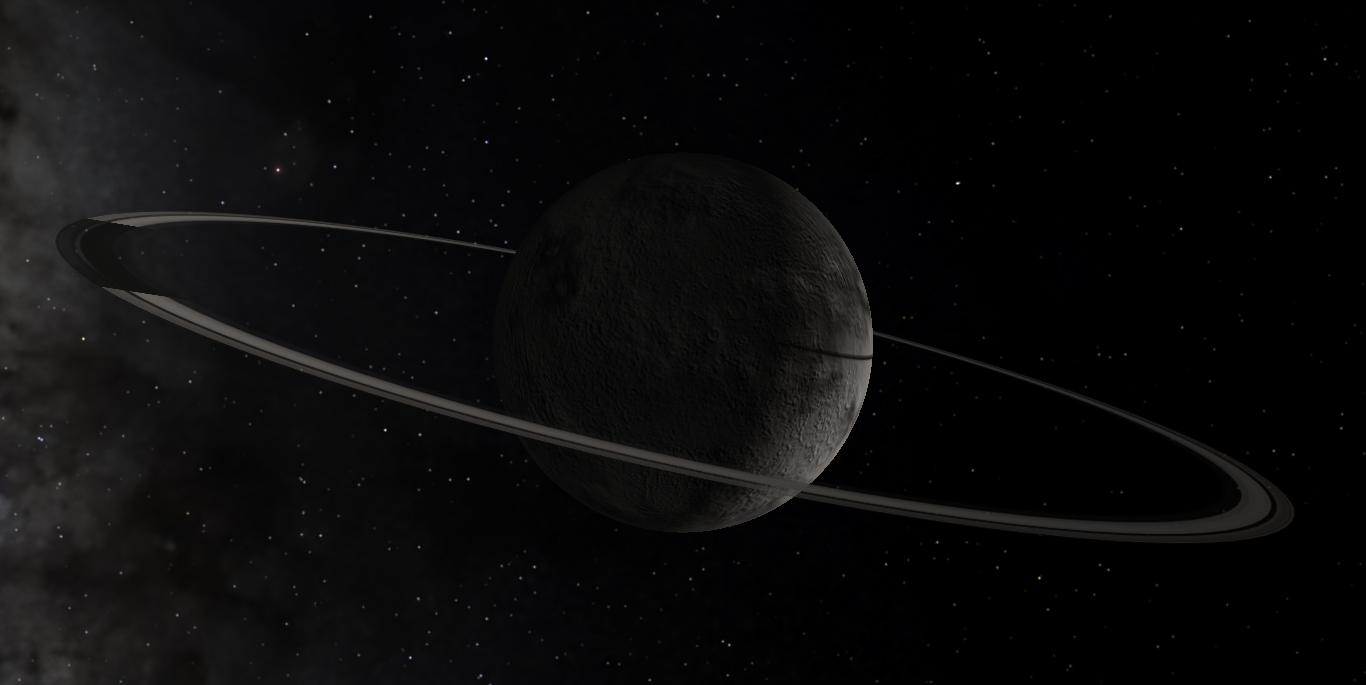
Depiction of Chiron and its rings

Rings of Chiron
Ring	Radius (km)	Width (km)	Optical depth (τ)	Notes
Chi1R	273	N/A	0.045–0.12	At 1:2 SOR
Chi2R	325	2–9 (gap)	0.1 (2023); 0.33 (1993)	Close to 1:3 SOR bifurcated (2023)
Chi3R	438	7–44	0.03–0.3	outside Roche limit azimuthal τ variation
Dust disk	750 (outer)	550	0.016	
Chi4R	1380	93	10^{−3}	

Chiron has rings, similar to the better-established rings of 10199 Chariklo. (Note: A stellar occultation in 2017 of another minor planet, Haumea (a trans-Neptunian object), indicated the presence of a ring.) Based on unexpected occultation events observed in stellar-occultation data obtained on 7 November 1993, 9 March 1994, and 29 November 2011, which were initially interpreted as resulting from jets associated with Chiron's comet-like activity, Chiron's rings were proposed to be 324±10 km in radius and sharply defined. The rings' changing appearance at different viewing angles can largely explain the long-term variation in Chiron's brightness and hence estimates of Chiron's albedo and size. Moreover, it can, by assuming that the water ice is in Chiron's rings, explain the changing intensity of the infrared water-ice absorption bands in Chiron's spectrum, including their disappearance in 2001 (when the rings were edge-on). Also, the geometric albedo of Chiron's rings as determined by spectroscopy is consistent with that used to explain Chiron's long-term brightness variations.

Further evidence of the rings was provided by two independent observations of occultations on 28 November 2018 and 15 December 2022, which suggests that their structure is constantly evolving. In the 2018 event Chiron's rings were observed to have less material than in 2011, but seemed to be developing a partial third ring; by the 2022 event there was more material than either of the previous observations, and the third ring had become fully developed. J.L. Ortiz speculated that the extra material in the 2022 event could be from an outburst observed in 2021, which left more material in orbit and thus bolstered the generation of the third ring—this is also expected to be cyclical, maintaining the rings.

Further observations of an occultation on 10 September 2023 revealed significant evolution of the system. Analyses of the event revealed that the rings were divided into two broad regions: an inner broad region between 220 km and 750 km, with peaks (corresponding to Chi1R, Chi2R, and Chi3R) at 273, 325, and 438 km out, and a far sparser disk of material at 1380 km and about 100 km in width. Chi2R was discovered to be dividing itself in two, and had decreased its optical depth by a factor of 3 between 2011 and 2023. The observations also carry the implication of Chiron's mass, density, and Roche limit, with Chi1R falling almost precisely at the 1:2 spin-orbit resonance with a density of 1.119±0.004 g/cm^{3} and the previously characterized rotation period of 5.918 h, and Chi2R falling close to the 1:3 spin-orbit resonance.

The preferred pole of Chiron's rings is, in ecliptic coordinates, λ = 151.3°±4.0°, β = 19.9°±6.0°. The rings' width, separation, and optical depths were observed to be nearly identical to those of Chariklo's rings until the 2018 observation, indicating that the same type of structure had been responsible for both. However, while Chi1R and 2R are within their respective Roche limits as Chariklo's are, Chi3R and 4R fall outside the Roche limit and therefore may require alternative mechanisms to explain it.

== Exploration ==
The Chiron Orbiter Mission was a mission proposed for NASA's New Frontiers program or Flagship program. It was published in May 2010 and proposed an orbiter mission to Chiron. Its launch date could have varied from as early as 2023 to as late as 2025, depending on budget and propulsion type.

There was another mission proposed, part of the Discovery Program known as Centaurus; if approved, it would have launched between 2026 and 2029 and made a flyby of 2060 Chiron and one other centaur sometime in the 2030s.

== In Popular Culture ==
In 1986, an early episode of ALF had Brian Tanner creating a model solar system as a school project. Alf points out that two planets near Pluto(called 'Dave' and 'Alvin' on Melmac) are missing. After adding them, Brian's teacher gives him a failing grade, but an outraged Alf calls the school in his friend's defense, and then Palomar Observatory for confirmation. When the principal arrives to speak to the Tanners, Willie lays into Alf for butting in, but Alf reveals that the observatory has stated they have sighted 'Dave', which is apparently Object Chiron. Willie apologizes to Alf, while the principal gives Brian a better grade, commending his openness to new ideas.

== Gallery ==
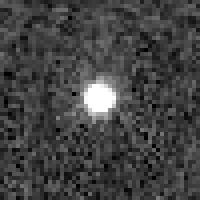
Hubble Space Telescope image of the centaur 2060 Chiron, taken on 14 September 2015

Chaotic, unstable motion of Chiron with Saturn (stationary, white dot at 10 o'clock) and Jupiter (blue)

Animated orbital diagram with Chiron (violet), alongside the giant planets Jupiter (red), Saturn (yellow), and Uranus (green). Perturbations of Chiron's orbit are not shown

== See also ==
- List of centaurs (small Solar System bodies) § 2060
- List of Solar System objects by size
- Lists of small Solar System bodies
- 10199 Chariklo

== Notes ==
Numbered comets
Previous; 94P/Russell	95P/Chiron	Next; 96P/Machholz
