= Roche limit =

Orbital radius at which a satellite might break up due to gravitational force

A celestial body (yellow) is orbited by a mass of fluid (blue) held together by gravity, here viewed from above the orbital plane. Far from the Roche limit (white line), the mass is practically spherical.

Closer to the Roche limit, the body is deformed by tidal forces.

Within the Roche limit, the mass's own gravity can no longer withstand the tidal forces, and the body disintegrates.

Particles closer to the primary move more quickly than particles farther away, as represented by the red arrows.

The varying orbital speed of the material eventually causes it to form a ring.

In celestial mechanics, the Roche limit, also called Roche radius, is the distance from a celestial body within which a second celestial body, held together only by its own force of gravity, will disintegrate because the first body's tidal forces exceed the second body's self-gravitation. Inside the Roche limit, orbiting material disperses and forms rings, whereas outside the limit, material tends to coalesce. The Roche radius depends on the radius of the second body and on the ratio of the bodies' densities.

The term is named after Édouard Roche (French: [ʁɔʃ], English: /rɒʃ/ ROSH), the French astronomer who first calculated this theoretical limit in 1848.

== Explanation ==
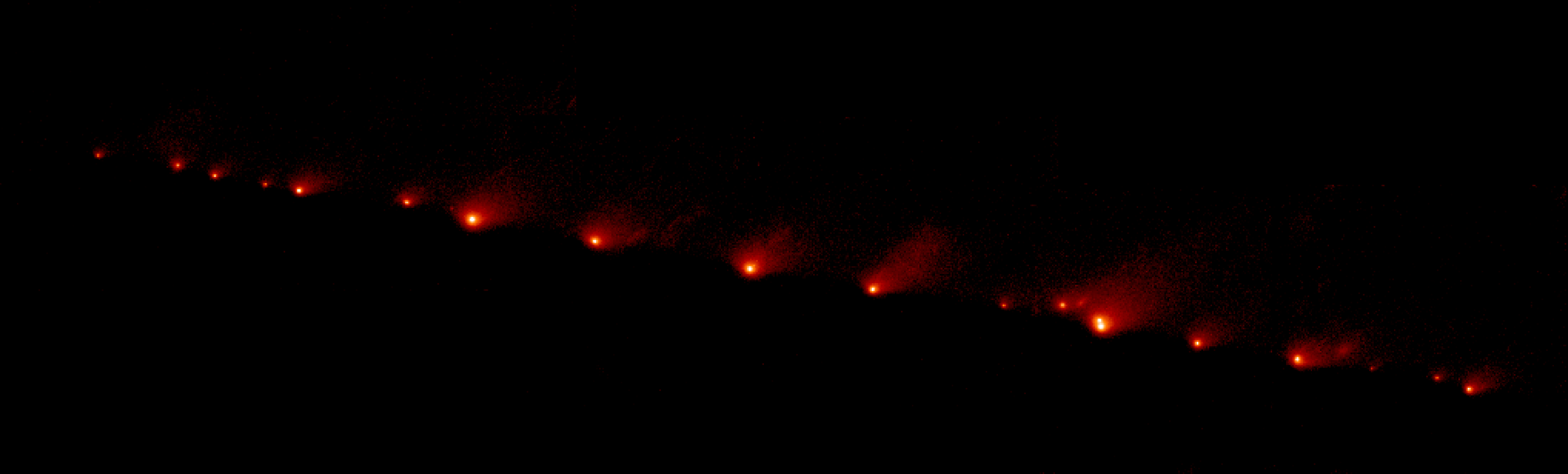
Comet Shoemaker–Levy 9 was disintegrated by the tidal forces of Jupiter into a string of smaller bodies in 1992, before colliding with the planet in 1994.

The Roche limit typically applies to a satellite's disintegration due to tidal forces induced by its primary, the body around which it orbits. Parts of the satellite that are closer to the primary are attracted more strongly by gravity from the primary than parts that are farther away; this disparity effectively pulls the near and far parts of the satellite apart from each other, and if the disparity (combined with any centrifugal effects due to the object's spin) is larger than the force of gravity holding the satellite together, it can pull the satellite apart. Some real satellites, both natural and artificial, can orbit within their Roche limits because they are held together by forces other than gravitation. Objects resting on the surface of such a satellite would be lifted away by tidal forces. A weaker satellite, such as a comet, could be broken up when it passes within its Roche limit.

Since, within the Roche limit, tidal forces overwhelm the gravitational forces that might otherwise hold the satellite together, no satellite can gravitationally coalesce out of smaller particles within that limit. Indeed, almost all known planetary rings are located within their Roche limit. (Notable exceptions are Saturn's Phoebe ring, which is formed from particles released from the moons Enceladus and Phoebe due to cryovolcanic plumes, and Saturn's E-Ring, which is caused by meteoroid impacts)

The gravitational effect occurring below the Roche limit is not the only factor that causes comets to break apart. Splitting by thermal stress, internal gas pressure, and rotational splitting are other ways for a comet to split under stress.

== Determination ==
The limiting distance to which a satellite can approach without breaking up depends on the rigidity of the satellite. At one extreme, a completely rigid satellite will maintain its shape until tidal forces break it apart. At the other extreme, a highly fluid satellite gradually deforms leading to increased tidal forces, causing the satellite to elongate, further compounding the tidal forces and causing it to break apart more readily.

Most real satellites would lie somewhere between these two extremes, with tensile strength rendering the satellite neither perfectly rigid nor perfectly fluid. For example, a rubble-pile asteroid will behave more like a fluid than a solid rocky one; an icy body will behave quite rigidly at first but become more fluid as tidal heating accumulates and its ices begin to melt.

But note that, as defined above, the Roche limit refers to a body held together solely by the gravitational forces which cause otherwise unconnected particles to coalesce, thus forming the body in question. The Roche limit is also usually calculated for the case of a circular orbit, although it is straightforward to modify the calculation to apply to the case (for example) of a body passing the primary on a parabolic or hyperbolic trajectory.

=== Rigid satellites ===
The rigid-body Roche limit is a simplified calculation for a spherical satellite. Irregular shapes such as those of tidal deformation on the body or the primary it orbits are neglected. It is assumed to be in hydrostatic equilibrium. These assumptions, although unrealistic, greatly simplify calculations.

The Roche limit for a rigid spherical satellite is the distance, $d$, from the primary at which the gravitational force on a test mass at the surface of the object is exactly equal to the tidal force pulling the mass away from the object:

$$d = R_M\left(2 \frac {\rho_M} {\rho_m} \right)^{\frac{1}{3}}$$

where $R_M$ is the radius of the primary, $\rho_M$ is the density of the primary, and $\rho_m$ is the density of the satellite.

This represents the orbital distance inside of which loose material (e.g. regolith) on the surface of the satellite closest to the primary would be pulled away, and likewise material on the side opposite the primary will also go away from, rather than toward, the satellite.

Since the limit depends only on the density, this implies, that the satellite will be torn entirely, if it consists of loose dust or separate rocks bound only by gravity.

=== Fluid satellites ===
A more accurate approach for calculating the Roche limit takes the deformation of the satellite into account. An extreme example would be a tidally locked liquid satellite orbiting a planet, where any force acting upon the satellite would deform it into a prolate spheroid.

The calculation is complex and its result cannot be represented in an exact algebraic formula. Roche himself derived the following approximate solution for the Roche limit:

$$d \approx  2.44 \ R\left( \frac {\rho_M} {\rho_m} \right)^{1/3}$$

However, a better approximation that takes into account the primary's oblateness and the satellite's mass is:

$$d \approx 2.423 \ R\left( \frac {\rho_M} {\rho_m} \right)^{1/3} \left( \frac{(1+\frac{m}{3M})+\frac{c}{3R}(1+\frac{m}{M})}{1-c/R} \right)^{1/3}$$

where $c/R$ is the oblateness of the primary.

The fluid solution is appropriate for bodies that are only loosely held together, such as a comet. For instance, comet Shoemaker–Levy 9's decaying orbit around Jupiter passed within its Roche limit in July 1992, causing it to fragment into a number of smaller pieces. On its next approach in 1994, the fragments crashed into the planet. Shoemaker–Levy 9 was first observed in 1993, but its orbit indicated that it had been captured by Jupiter a few decades prior.

== Modern revisions and exceptions to the Roche limit ==
A 2023 study of the rings of Quaoar prompted a call for a revision of some of the popularly-held assumptions of the Roche limit. Observatories and telescopes in the study of occultation data included CHEOPS, Instituto de Astrofísica de Canarias, the High Energy Stereoscopic System in Khomas-Namibia, and Reedy Creek Observatory.

The classical Roche limit assumes that particles will generally accrete beyond this limit as satellites, large spherical bodies, and not as rings, where gravity from the parent is lower, but the rings of Quaoar exist at ~7.4 planetary radii, far beyond the Roche limit at which rings should be able to exist.

One possible explanation for the non-accretion of the ring system into satellites could be its composition. Icy particles would be highly elastic; thus, collisions between them would result in higher velocities, creating a more dynamic energy state than the more static state presumed by the Roche limit.

Another possible explanation for the existence of the rings beyond the Roche limit is the non-axisymmetric shape of Quaoar itself. This shape creates inconsistent gravitational forces. In the time it takes for Quaoar to make one axial revolution, its rings complete one-third of a revolution. This sets up a 1:3 orbital resonance, whereby the particles are maintained in a high-energy steady state and prevented from clumping into larger masses.

Whereas the Roche limit presumes a dependency on tidal forces, the Quaoar study posits a dynamic potential of energy within a ring that is determined by compositional elasticity and orbital resonances.

== See also ==
- Roche lobe
- Chandrasekhar limit
- Spaghettification (the extreme case of tidal distortion)
- Hill sphere
- Sphere of influence (black hole)
- Black hole
- Triton (moon) (Neptune's satellite)
- Comet Shoemaker–Levy 9

== Sources ==
- Chandrasekhar, Subrahmanyan (1969). Ellipsoidal Figures of Equilibrium. Yale University Press. ISBN 978-0-300-01116-6.
- Chandrasekhar, S. (1963). "The Equilibrium and the Stability of the Roche Ellipsoids". The Astrophysical Journal. 138: 1182. Bibcode:1963ApJ...138.1182C. doi:10.1086/147716. ISSN 0004-637X.
- Roche, Édouard (1849). "La figure d'une masse fluide soumise à l'attraction d'un point éloigné, part 1". Mémoires de la section des sciences, Volume 1. Académie des sciences de Montpellier. pp. 243–262. 2.44 is mentioned on page 258.
- Roche, Édouard (1850). "La figure d'une masse fluide soumise à l'attraction d'un point éloigné, part 2". Mémoires de la section des sciences, Volume 1. Académie des sciences de Montpellier. pp. 333–348.
- Roche, Édouard (1851). "La figure d'une masse fluide soumise à l'attraction d'un point éloigné, part 3". Mémoires de la section des sciences, Volume 2. Académie des sciences de Montpellier. pp. 21–32.
- Howard Darwin, George (1910). "On the figure and stability of a liquid satellite". Scientific Papers, Volume 3. pp. 436–524.
- Hopwood Jeans, James (1919). "Chapter III: Ellipsoidal configurations of equilibrium". Problems of cosmogony and stellar dynamics.
