= Solar eclipses on the Moon =

Lunar phenomenon wherein the Sun is obscured by Earth

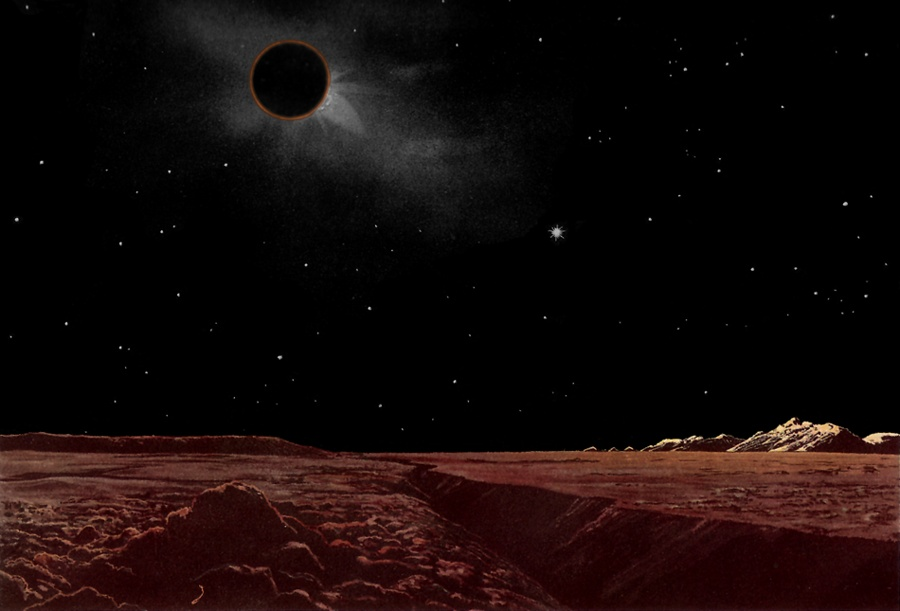
A painting by Lucien Rudaux showing how a solar eclipse might appear when viewed from the lunar surface.

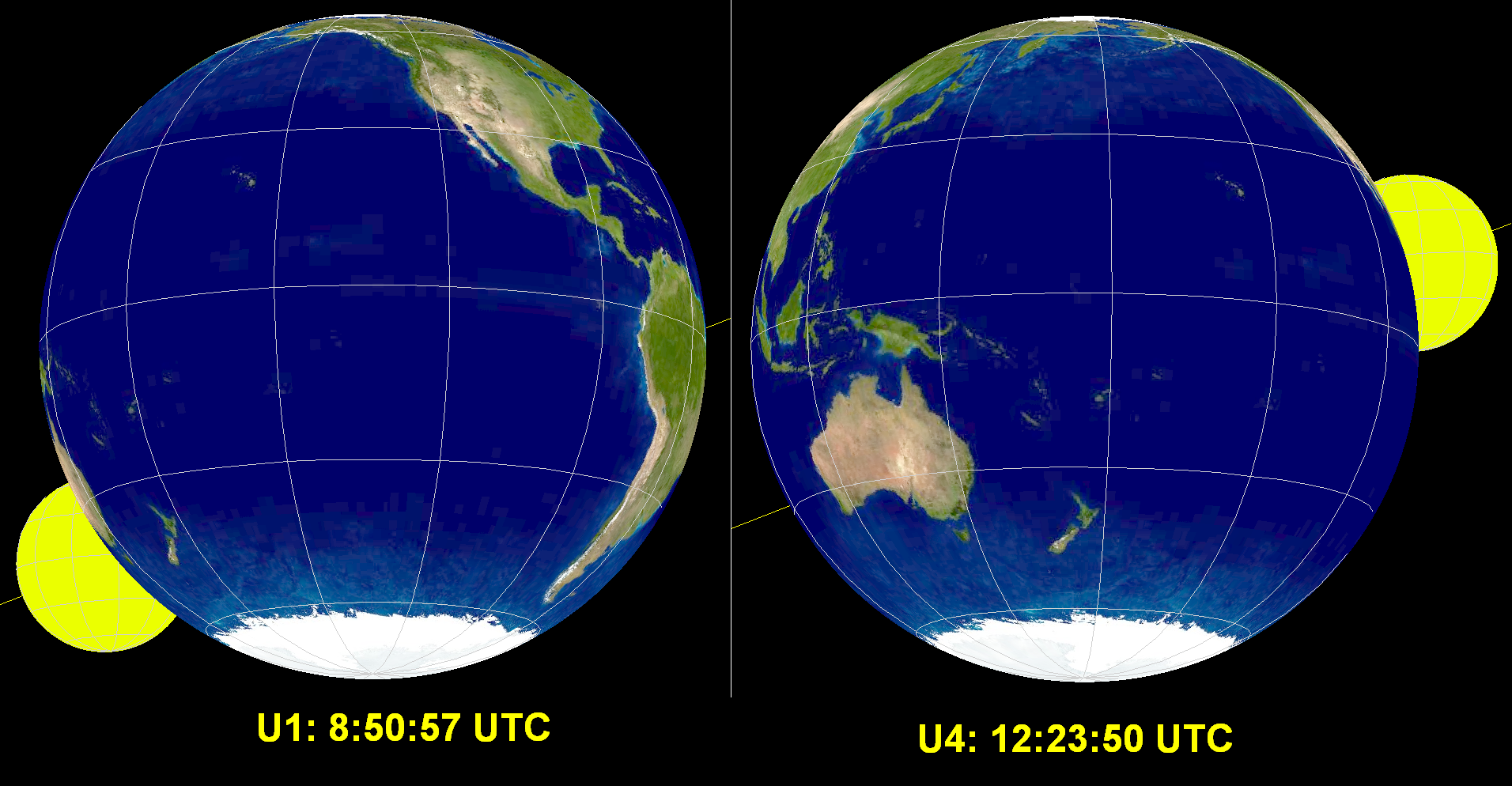
A simulation of the start and end of the August 28, 2007 lunar eclipse, viewed from the center of the Moon.

Solar eclipses on the Moon happen when the planet Earth passes in front of the Sun and blocks its light. Viewers on Earth experience a lunar eclipse during a solar eclipse on the Moon.

These solar eclipses are only seen in the near side portion and smaller parts of the far side where Earth is seen during librations, these areas of the moon making up the visible portion of the Moon. Eclipses there are seen during the lunar sunrise and sunset and extend to the furthermost areas of the near side but mainly not in the polar areas of the Moon. While the Moon orbits Earth, Earth rotates once in nearly 24 hours, but its position at the sky is only in one position, as it never changes. This is in contrast to some other moons or other satellites orbiting other planets or dwarf planets and a few asteroids, even inside the Solar System. They are, however, very rare in the outer part of the Solar System.

The last solar eclipse on the Moon was a total eclipse on 3 March 2026, with the entire near side and tiny surroundings of the far side seeing totality. The next total eclipse will occur on 28 August 2026.

== Length ==
A simulation of the Moon entering the Earth shadow, creating a total lunar eclipse on September 27, 2015

While a solar eclipse on Earth lasts for up to two and a half hours, a solar eclipse on the Moon lasts for up to five and a half hours. However, some eclipses on the Moon last for about five hours in one area, despite the Earth's shadow touching the Moon for a maximum of six hours. When the Earth and Moon are closer, eclipses are longer, and from Earth, the Moon's apparent diameter is greater than the Sun. However, when the Earth and Moon are further apart, eclipses are shorter, and from Earth, the Moon's apparent diameter is lesser than the Sun.

Solar eclipses on Earth start and end at different locations each time, while solar eclipses on the moon always begin in the westernmost parts and end in the easternmost parts of the near side, and are always around the equator. However, partial solar eclipses start near and within the polar areas.

== Penumbral shadow ==
The penumbral shadow does not appear during a solar eclipse on the Moon until it is around 25–30% obscuration. It becomes darker as the Earth blocks the sunlight until it reaches totality. In some eclipses, the penumbral shadow covers the whole surface, whereas the center of the Earth's shadow misses a portion of the Moon while every part of the Nearside sees a partial eclipse. These eclipses are very rare. This has not occurred since the 18th century. On Earth, they are seen as total penumbral eclipses.

The Moon passes a narrow path within the penumbra and outside the umbra, which can happen on the Earth's northern or southern penumbral edges. These eclipses can last up to four and a half hours without having any part of the Moon, notably at its poles, reaching totality.

== Centre of the Earth's shadow ==
During the April 1967 lunar eclipse Surveyor 3 took these first pictures of a Solar eclipse from the Moon's surface. They are also the first photographs of a body other than the Moon eclipsing the Sun.

While the Earth receives a small portion of the Moon's umbra during total solar eclipses, the Moon's near side is usually entirely covered by the Earth's umbra during total solar eclipses. Some total and all partial eclipses have at most half or a part of the Moon being in the Earth's umbra.

Unlike the Earth, whose umbral shadow appears black, as the Moon has no atmosphere, the surface appears not just black but red and brown, according to the Danjon scale. This is because the only sunlight available is refracted through the Earth's atmosphere on the edges of the Earth, forming an atmospheric ring.

=== Temperatures during long totality ===
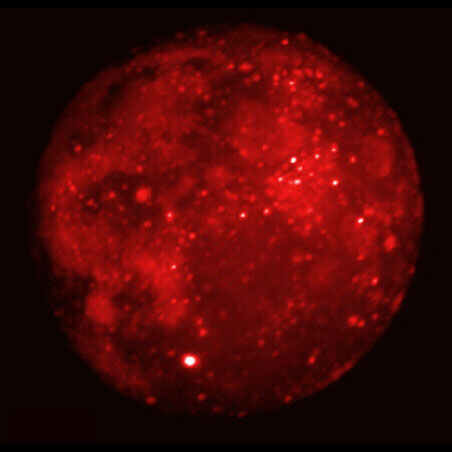
The mid-infrared image of the Moon taken during the September 1996 lunar eclipse by the SPIRIT-III instrument aboard the orbiting Midcourse Space Experiment (MSX) satellite. The brightest regions are the warmest, and the darkest areas are the coolest.

During eclipses with long totality, temperatures plunge on the moon but not in many of its maria. However, in some areas, the temperatures remain high. This especially applies to Oceanus Procellarum and Mare Tranquillitatis and mid to large craters, especially those with basalt floors and mostly in the middle portion of the Moon, some young craters, and a few distant large craters, notably Tycho (located at 43.31°S). Some craters are slightly cooler but as warm as the surface and warmer than areas outside the basins such as Copernicus and Langrenus.

== Partial eclipses ==
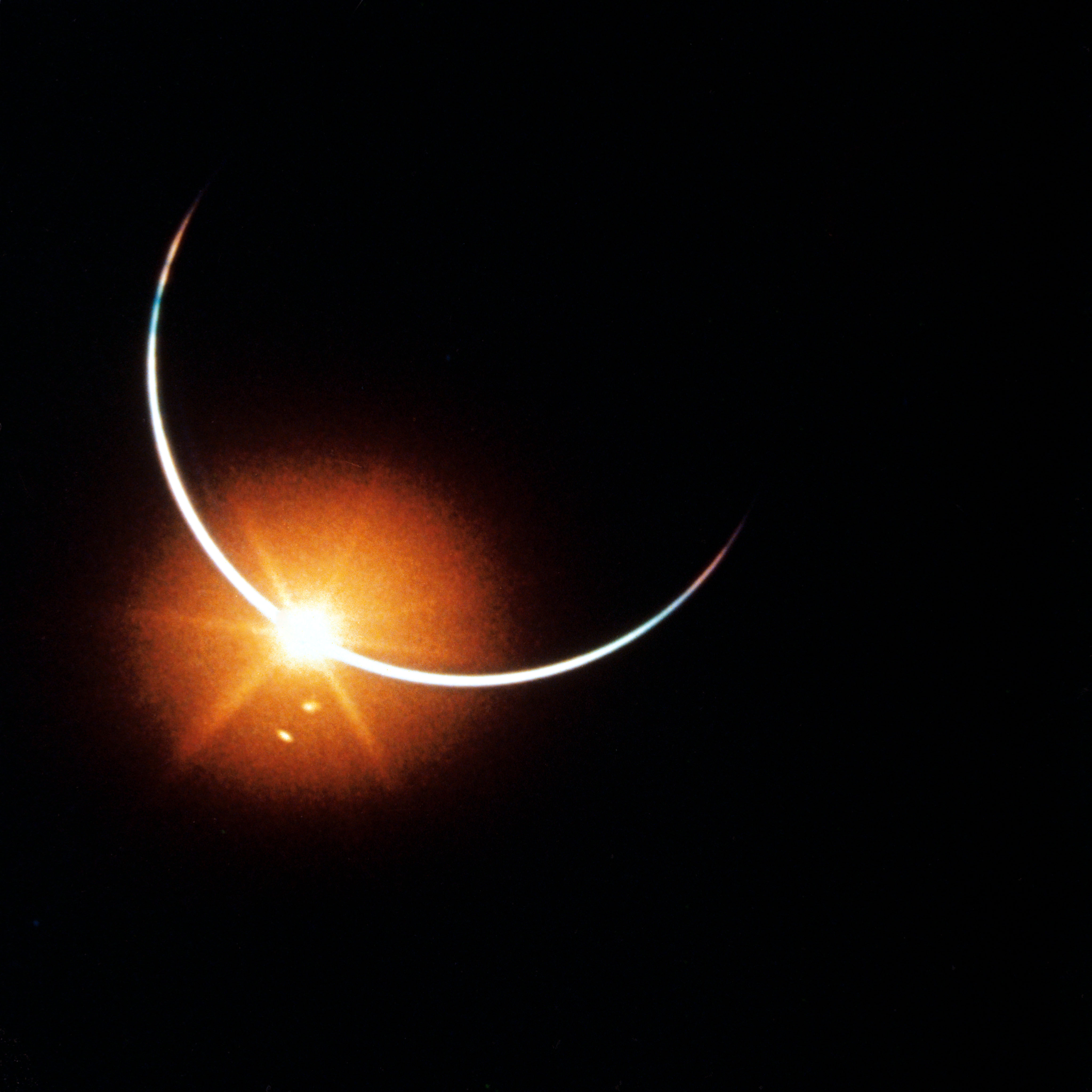
Apollo 12 photograph of Earth occulting the Sun.

On the Moon, when there is a partial eclipse, a part of the Moon has a partial eclipse, either north or south. One example of this is when half of the Sun is blocked, north or south. In some partial eclipses when the center of the Earth's shadow misses the Moon, one hemisphere can have a partial eclipse while the other does not. In some eclipses, when the center of the Earth's shadow covers a part or most, one part has a total eclipse, and one part has a partial eclipse. Partial and total eclipses together with simply partial last for up to about six hours without having totality in all parts of the near side and a very small part of the far side next to the near side. Standalone partial and total eclipses between partial eclipses can last up to 3.5 hours.

== At its edges of the near side and its small surroundings ==
At the edges of the near side and a small surrounding part of the hard side where the Earth is mostly half- or partly-seen, in the west, some solar eclipses begin at sunrise, and the Sun is seen after sunrise. In some eclipses, the Sun is partially visible, partially eclipsed in others. In the east, some solar eclipses end at sunset, and the Sun is seen before sunset. In other eclipses, the Sun is partially visible.

It also occurs in several polar areas. In that part of the Moon, the Earth is seen in the high-altitude areas of craters, hills, and mountains, as well as a few areas such as lunar seas (also known as plains). In some areas, it is visible in deep craters and most of the surrounding lower-ground areas. In the middle parts, the Earth is never visible, and its eclipses are never seen as the crater and its mountains, including crater ones, block the view. In areas around seven to eight degrees near the far side, a part of the Earth's view is blocked. In some eclipses, this phenomenon begins not long after sunrise in the west and ends not long before sunset in the east. At that location, they are seen at higher altitudes and at most medium altitudes.

At the furthermost areas of the far side within the near side, a part of the Earth is seen but only in the highest portions.

== Exception on one part of the Moon ==
About ninety-one percent of the far side never experiences solar eclipses as the Earth is never seen there because the limit of the view of the planet during librations is about eight degrees within the near side.

Eclipses are generally not seen in the fringes of the near side, within the far side, or in the lower and most of the middle parts. Around it, it is not seen in the lower parts. In that location and around it, the eclipses are never seen in most crater hollows or some of the lowest parts of some crater hollows. Eclipses are never seen in crater hollows in the polar regions where the sun never shines. Between the 75th and the 80th parallel north or south, eclipses are never seen in most crater hollows such as the middle and, notably, the lowest portions.

== History ==
In early lunar history, after around 4.3 billion years, when the Moon was formed, it orbited closer to Earth. The totality of its eclipses lasted longer than current eclipses. Millions of years later, the totality shrank, and the partial portion of the eclipse was rising. Eclipses were more frequent around this time. Tens of millions of years later, eclipses became less numerous as the lunar orbit slowly moved away from the Earth. The view of the sun, even its chromosphere, was blocked by the Earth. Around some hundreds of millions of years ago, the Earth blocked all of the Sun's chromosphere; totality was slightly longer than the partial portion. At the same time, there were more partial eclipses on the Moon. As the Moon recedes about 3.8 centimetres (1.5 in) each year, the eclipse totality length slowly shrinks, and the partial portion slowly lengthens.

== Saros series ==
The Solar Saros series of the Moon is the equivalent to the Lunar Saros series of the Earth.

== In popular culture ==
In a package of Wills's Cigarettes, one of the tobacco cards first issued in 1928 for a few years displays a solar eclipse on the Moon showing the atmospheric ring.

== See also ==
- Extraterrestrial sky § Eclipses from the Moon – Extraterrestrial view of outer space
- Lunar eclipse – Natural phenomenon wherein the Earth casts a shadow on the Moon
- Danjon scale – Measurement of appearance of lunar eclipse
- Solar eclipses on Mars – When moons of Mars pass before the Sun
- Solar eclipses on Jupiter – When moons of Jupiter pass before the Sun
- Solar eclipses on Neptune – When moons of Nepture pass before the Sun
- Solar eclipses on Saturn – When moons of Saturn pass before the Sun
- Solar eclipses on Uranus – When moons of Uranus pass before the Sun
