= Solar eclipses on Neptune =

When moons of Nepture pass before the Sun

Solar eclipses on Neptune occur when substantial natural satellites of Neptune pass in front of the Sun as seen from the planet.

For bodies which appear smaller in angular diameter than the Sun, the proper term would be a transit, and for bodies which are larger than the apparent size of the Sun, the proper term would be an occultation.

Almost all of Neptune's inner moons and Triton can eclipse the Sun as seen from Neptune. The last solar eclipse on Neptune by Triton occurred in 1953, and the next will be in 2046.

All other satellites of Neptune are too small and/or too distant to produce an umbra.

From this distance, the Sun's angular diameter is reduced to one and a quarter arcminutes across. Here are the angular diameters of the moons that are large enough to fully eclipse the Sun: Naiad, 7–13'; Thalassa, 8–14'; Despina, 14–22'; Galatea, 13–18'; Larissa, 10–14'; Proteus, 13–16'; Triton, 26–28'.

Just because the moons are large enough to fully eclipse the Sun does not necessarily mean that they will do so. Eclipses of the Sun from Neptune are rare due to the planet's long orbital period and large axial tilt of 28 degrees. In addition, the largest moon, Triton, has an orbital inclination of about 25 degrees to Neptune's equator. This makes eclipses of the Sun by Triton rare. Even when such an eclipse does occur, it passes rather quickly, as Triton moves in the opposite direction of Neptune's rotation.
