= Rings of Neptune =

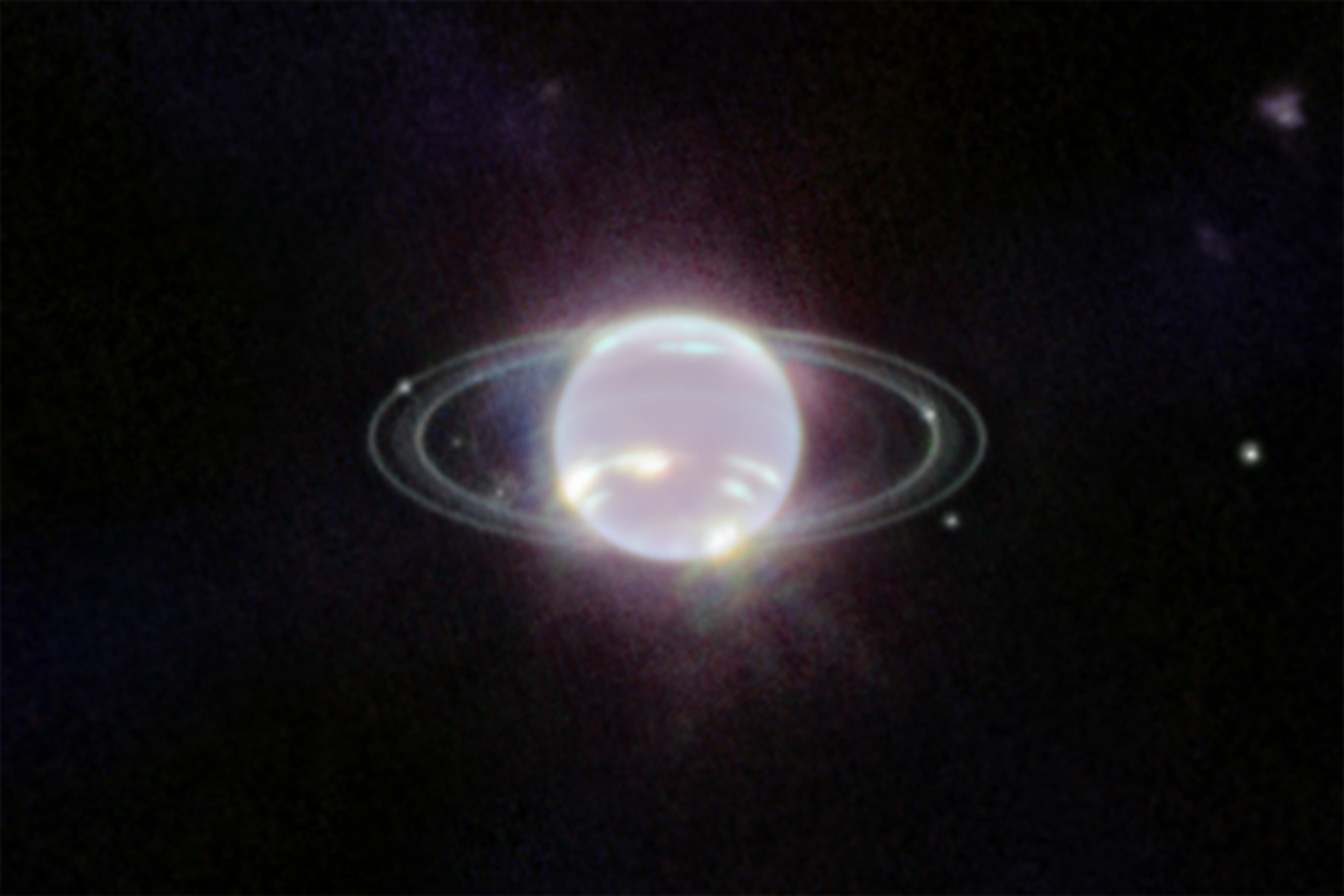
Rings of Neptune imaged by the James Webb Space Telescope's NIRCam instrument

The rings of Neptune consist primarily of five principal rings. They were first discovered (as "arcs") by simultaneous observations of a stellar occultation on 22 July 1984 by Patrice Bouchet, Reinhold Häfner and Jean Manfroid at the La Silla Observatory (ESO) who were conducting a star occultation observation program proposed by André Brahic, Bruno Sicardy and Françoise Roques of the Paris-Meudon Observatory and William B. Hubbard's teams at Cerro Tololo Interamerican Observatory in Chile. They were eventually imaged in 1989 by the Voyager 2 spacecraft. At their densest, they are comparable to the less dense portions of Saturn's main rings such as the C ring and the Cassini Division, but much of Neptune's ring system is quite faint and dusty, in some aspects more closely resembling the rings of Jupiter. Neptune's rings are named after astronomers who contributed important work on the planet: Galle, Le Verrier, Lassell, Arago, and Adams. Neptune also has a faint unnamed ring coincident with the orbit of the moon Galatea. Three other moons orbit between the rings: Naiad, Thalassa and Despina.

The rings of Neptune are made of extremely dark material, likely organic compounds processed by radiation, similar to those found in the rings of Uranus. The proportion of dust in the rings (between 20% and 70%) is high, while their optical depth is low to moderate, at lower than 0.1. Uniquely, the Adams ring includes five distinct arcs, named Fraternité, Égalité 1 and 2, Liberté, and Courage. The arcs occupy a narrow range of orbital longitudes and are remarkably stable, having changed only slightly since their initial detection in 1980. How the arcs are stabilized is still under debate. However, their stability is probably related to the resonant interaction between the Adams ring and its inner shepherd moon, Galatea.

== Discovery and observations ==
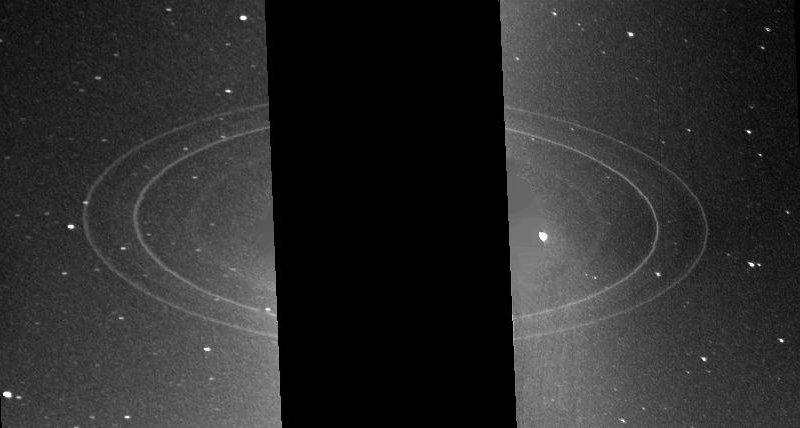
A pair of Voyager 2 images of Neptune's ring system

The first mention of rings around Neptune dates back to 1846 when William Lassell, the discoverer of Neptune's largest moon, Triton, thought he had seen a ring around the planet. However, his claim was never confirmed and it is likely that it was an observational artifact. The first reliable detection of a ring was made in 1968 by stellar occultation, although that result would go unnoticed until 1977 when the rings of Uranus were discovered. Soon after the Uranus discovery, a team from Villanova University led by Harold J. Reitsema began searching for rings around Neptune. On 24 May 1981, they detected a dip in a star's brightness during one occultation; however, the manner in which the star dimmed did not suggest a ring. Later, after the Voyager fly-by, it was found that the occultation was due to the small Neptunian moon Larissa, a highly unusual event.

In the 1980s, significant occultations were much rarer for Neptune than for Uranus, which lay near the Milky Way at the time and was thus moving against a denser field of stars. Neptune's next occultation, on 12 September 1983, resulted in a possible detection of a ring. However, ground-based results were inconclusive. Over the next six years, approximately 50 other occultations were observed with only about one-third of them yielding positive results. Something (probably incomplete arcs) definitely existed around Neptune, but the features of the ring system remained a mystery. The Voyager 2 spacecraft made the definitive discovery of the Neptunian rings during its fly-by of Neptune in 1989, passing by as close as 4,950 km (3,080 mi) above the planet's atmosphere on 25 August. It confirmed that occasional occultation events observed before were indeed caused by the arcs within the Adams ring (see below). After the Voyager fly-by the previous terrestrial occultation observations were reanalyzed yielding features of the ring's arcs as they were in 1980s, which matched those found by Voyager 2 almost perfectly.

Since Voyager 2's fly-by, the brightest rings (Adams and Le Verrier) have been imaged with the Hubble Space Telescope and Earth-based telescopes, owing to advances in resolution and light-gathering power. They are visible, slightly above background noise levels, at methane-absorbed wavelengths in which the glare from Neptune is significantly reduced. The fainter rings are still far below the visibility threshold for these instruments. In 2022 the rings were imaged by the James Webb Space Telescope, which made the first observation of the fainter rings since the Voyager 2's fly-by.

== General properties ==
The scheme of Neptune's ring-moon system. Solid lines denote rings; dashed lines denote orbits of moons.

Neptune possesses five distinct rings named, in order of increasing distance from the planet, Galle, Le Verrier, Lassell, Arago and Adams. In addition to these well-defined rings, Neptune may also possess an extremely faint sheet of material stretching inward from the Le Verrier to the Galle ring, and possibly farther in toward the planet. Three of the Neptunian rings are narrow, with widths of about 100 km or less; in contrast, the Galle and Lassell rings are broad—their widths are between 2,000 and 5,000 km. The Adams ring consists of five bright arcs embedded in a fainter continuous ring. Proceeding counterclockwise, the arcs are: Fraternité, Égalité 1 and 2, Liberté, and Courage. The first four names come from "liberty, equality, fraternity", the motto of the French Revolution and Republic. The terminology was suggested by their original discoverers, who had found them during stellar occultations in 1984 and 1985. Four small Neptunian moons have orbits inside the ring system: Naiad and Thalassa orbit in the gap between the Galle and Le Verrier rings; Despina is just inward of the Le Verrier ring; and Galatea lies slightly inward of the Adams ring, embedded in an unnamed faint, narrow ringlet.

The Neptunian rings contain a large quantity of micrometer-sized dust: the dust fraction by cross-section area is between 20% and 70%. In this respect they are similar to the rings of Jupiter, in which the dust fraction is 50%–100%, and are very different from the rings of Saturn and Uranus, which contain little dust (less than 0.1%). The particles in Neptune's rings are made from a dark material; probably a mixture of ice with radiation-processed organics. The rings are reddish in color, and their geometrical (0.05) and Bond (0.01–0.02) albedos are similar to those of the Uranian rings' particles and the inner Neptunian moons. The rings are generally optically thin (transparent); their normal optical depths do not exceed 0.1. As a whole, the Neptunian rings resemble those of Jupiter; both systems consist of faint, narrow, dusty ringlets and even fainter broad dusty rings.

The rings of Neptune, like those of Uranus, are thought to be relatively young; their age is probably significantly less than that of the Solar System. Also, like those of Uranus, Neptune's rings probably resulted from the collisional fragmentation of onetime inner moons. Such events create moonlet belts, which act as the sources of dust for the rings. In this respect the rings of Neptune are similar to faint dusty bands observed by Voyager 2 between the main rings of Uranus.

Infrared observations from the James Webb Space Telescope's Near Infrared Camera (NIRCam) indicate that the rings exhibit a weak absorption band of 3 micrometers.

== Inner rings ==
=== Galle ring ===
The innermost ring of Neptune is called the Galle ring after Johann Gottfried Galle, the first person to see Neptune through a telescope (1846). It is about 2,000 km wide and orbits 41,000–43,000 km from the planet. It is a faint ring with an average normal optical depth of around 10^{−4}, (Note: The normal optical depth τ of a ring is the ratio of the total geometrical cross-section of the ring's particles to the area of the ring. It assumes values from zero to infinity. A light beam passing normally through a ring will be attenuated by the factor e^{–τ}.) and with an equivalent depth of 0.15 km. (Note: The equivalent depth ED of a ring is defined as an integral of the normal optical depth across the ring. In other words ED = ∫τdr, where r is radius.) The fraction of dust in this ring is estimated from 40% to 70%.

=== Le Verrier ring ===
The next ring is named the Le Verrier ring after Urbain Le Verrier, who predicted Neptune's position in 1846. With an orbital radius of about 53,200 km, it is narrow, with a width of about 113 km. Its normal optical depth is 0.0062 ± 0.0015, which corresponds to an equivalent depth of 0.7 ± 0.2 km. The dust fraction in the Le Verrier ring ranges from 40% to 70%. The small moon Despina, which orbits just inside of it at 52,526 km, may play a role in the ring's confinement by acting as a shepherd.

=== Lassell ring ===
The Lassell ring, also known as the plateau, is the broadest ring in the Neptunian system. Its namesake is William Lassell, the English astronomer who discovered Neptune's largest moon, Triton. This ring is a faint sheet of material occupying the space between the Le Verrier ring at about 53,200 km and the Arago ring at 57,200 km. Its average normal optical depth is around 10^{−4}, which corresponds to an equivalent depth of 0.4 km. The ring's dust fraction is in the range from 20% to 40%.

==== Arago ring ====
There is a small peak of brightness near the outer edge of the Lassell ring, located at 57,200 km from Neptune and less than 100 km wide, which some planetary scientists call the Arago ring after François Arago, a French mathematician, physicist, astronomer and politician.

== Adams ring ==
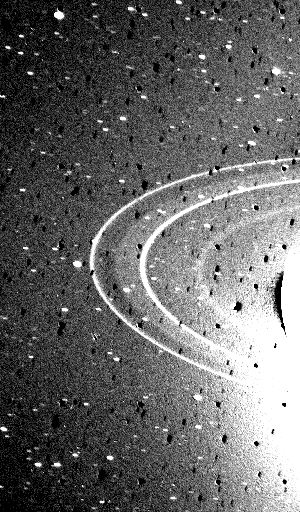
Arcs in the Adams ring (left to right: Fraternité, Égalité, Liberté), plus the Le Verrier ring on the inside

The outer Adams ring, with an orbital radius of about 63,930 km, is the best studied of Neptune's rings. It is named after John Couch Adams, who predicted the position of Neptune independently of Le Verrier. This ring is narrow, slightly eccentric and inclined, with total width of about 35 km (15–50 km), and its normal optical depth is around 0.011 ± 0.003 outside the arcs, which corresponds to the equivalent depth of about 0.4 km. The fraction of dust in this ring is from 20% to 40%—lower than in other narrow rings. Neptune's small moon Galatea, which orbits just inside of the Adams ring at 61,953 km, acts like a shepherd, keeping ring particles inside a narrow range of orbital radii through a 42:43 outer Lindblad resonance. Galatea's gravitational influence creates 42 radial wiggles in the Adams ring with an amplitude of about 30 km, which have been used to infer Galatea's mass.

=== Arcs ===
The brightest parts of the Adams ring, the ring arcs, were the first elements of Neptune's ring system to be discovered. The arcs are discrete regions within the ring in which the particles that it comprises are mysteriously clustered together. The Adams ring is known to comprise five short arcs, which occupy a relatively narrow range of longitudes from 247° to 294°. (Note: The longitude system is fixed as of 18 August 1989. The zero point corresponds to the zero meridian on Neptune.) In 1986 they were located between longitudes of:

- 247–257° (Fraternité),
- 261–264° (Égalité 1),
- 265–266° (Égalité 2),
- 276–280° (Liberté),
- 284.5–285.5° (Courage).

The brightest and longest arc was Fraternité; the faintest was Courage. The normal optical depths of the arcs are estimated to lie in the range 0.03–0.09 (0.034 ± 0.005 for the leading edge of Liberté arc as measured by stellar occultation); the radial widths are approximately the same as those of the continuous ring—about 30 km. The equivalent depths of arcs vary in the range 1.25–2.15 km (0.77 ± 0.13 km for the leading edge of Liberté arc). The fraction of dust in the arcs is from 40% to 70%. The arcs in the Adams ring are somewhat similar to the arc in Saturn's G ring.

The highest resolution Voyager 2 images revealed a pronounced clumpiness in the arcs, with a typical separation between visible clumps of 0.1° to 0.2°, which corresponds to 100–200 km along the ring. Because the clumps were not resolved, they may or may not include larger bodies, but are certainly associated with concentrations of microscopic dust as evidenced by their enhanced brightness when backlit by the Sun.

The arcs are quite stable structures. They were detected by ground-based stellar occultations in the 1980s, by Voyager 2 in 1989 and by Hubble Space Telescope and ground-based telescopes in 1997–2005 and remained at approximately the same orbital longitudes. However some changes have been noticed. The overall brightness of arcs decreased since 1986. The Courage arc jumped forward by 8° to 294° (it probably jumped over to the next stable co-rotation resonance position) while the Liberté arc had almost disappeared by 2003. The Fraternité and Égalité (1 and 2) arcs have demonstrated irregular variations in their relative brightness. Their observed dynamics is probably related to the exchange of dust between them. Courage, a very faint arc found during the Voyager flyby, was seen to flare in brightness in 1998; it was back to its usual dimness by June 2005. Visible light observations show that the total amount of material in the arcs has remained approximately constant, but they are dimmer in the infrared light wavelengths where previous observations were taken.

=== Confinement ===
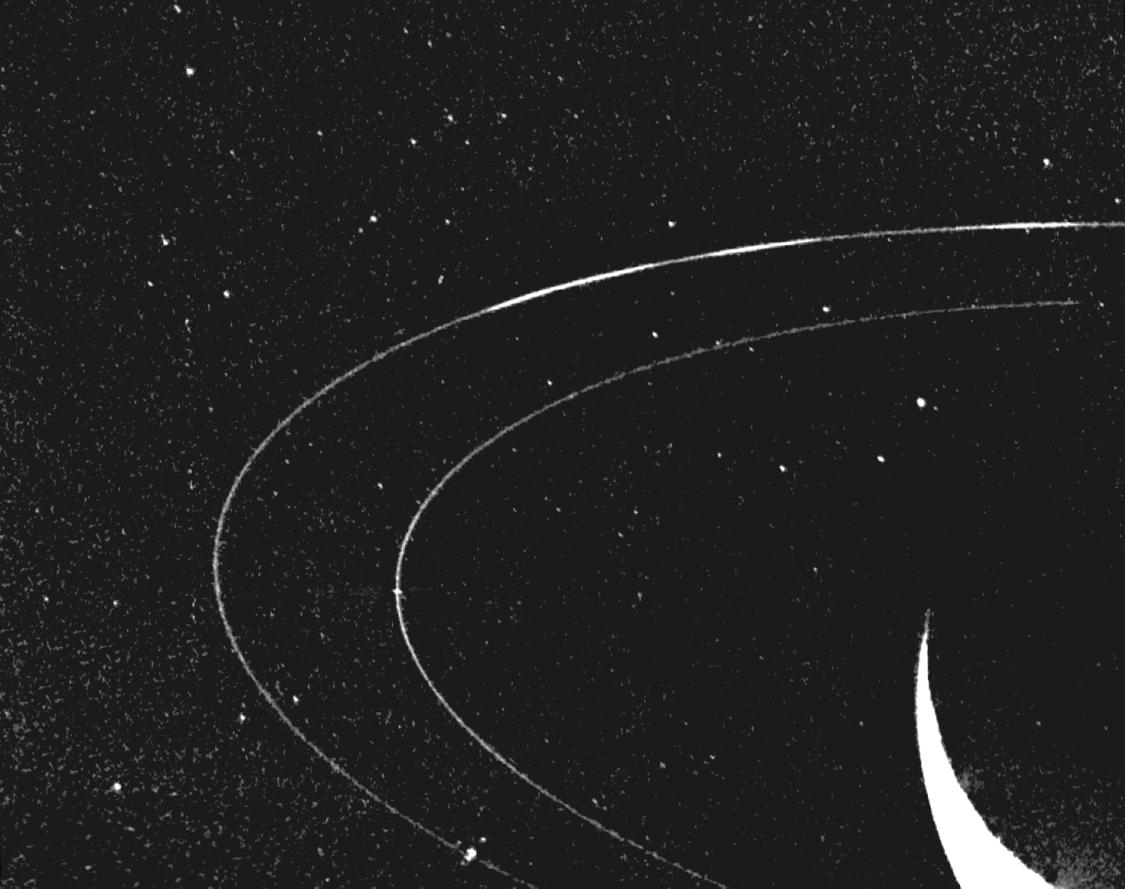
Arcs in the Adams ring, as seen in this low-exposure image

The arcs in the Adams ring remain unexplained. Their existence is a puzzle because basic orbital dynamics imply that they should spread out into a uniform ring over a matter of years. Several hypotheses about the arcs' confinement have been suggested, the most widely publicized of which holds that Galatea confines the arcs via its 42:43 co-rotational inclination resonance (CIR). (Note: The corotation inclination resonance (CIR) of the order m between a moon on inclined orbit and a ring occurs if the pattern speed of the perturbing potential $\Omega$ (from a moon) equals the mean motion of the ring particles $n_p$. In other words the following condition should be met $m\Omega=n_pm=(m-1)n_s+\dot\Omega_s$, where $\dot\Omega_s$ and $n_s$ are the nodal precession rate and mean motion of the moon, respectively. CIR supports 2m stable sites along the ring.) The resonance creates 84 stable sites along the ring's orbit, each 4° long, with arcs residing in the adjacent sites. However measurements of the rings' mean motion with Hubble and Keck telescopes in 1998 led to the conclusion that the rings are not in CIR with Galatea.

A later model suggested that confinement resulted from a co-rotational eccentricity resonance (CER). (Note: The corotation eccentricity resonance (CER) of the order m between a moon on eccentric orbit and a ring occurs if the pattern speed of the perturbing potential $\Omega$ (from a moon) equals the mean motion of the ring particles $n_p$. In other words the following condition should be met $m\Omega=n_pm=(m-1)n_s+\dot\omega_s$, where $\dot\omega_s$ and $n_s$ are the apsidal precession rate and mean motion of the moon, respectively. CER supports m stable sites along the ring.) The model takes into account the finite mass of the Adams ring, which is necessary to move the resonance closer to the ring. A byproduct of this hypothesis is a mass estimate for the Adams ring—about 0.002 of the mass of Galatea. A third hypothesis proposed in 1986 requires an additional moon orbiting inside the ring; the arcs in this case are trapped in its stable Lagrangian points. However Voyager 2's observations placed strict constraints on the size and mass of any undiscovered moons, making such a hypothesis unlikely. Some other more complicated hypotheses hold that a number of moonlets are trapped in co-rotational resonances with Galatea, providing confinement of the arcs and simultaneously serving as sources of the dust.

== Exploration ==
The rings were investigated in detail during the Voyager 2 spacecraft's flyby of Neptune in August 1989. They were studied with optical imaging, and through observations of occultations in ultraviolet and visible light. The spaceprobe observed the rings in different geometries relative to the Sun, producing images of back-scattered, forward-scattered and side-scattered light. (Note: Forward-scattered light is light scattered at a small angle relative to solar light. Back-scattered light is light scattered at an angle close to 180° (backwards) relative to solar light. The scattering angle is close to 90° for side-scattered light.) Analysis of these images allowed derivation of the phase function (dependence of the ring's reflectivity on the angle between the observer and Sun), and geometrical and Bond albedo of ring particles. Analysis of Voyager's images also led to discovery of six inner moons of Neptune, including the Adams ring shepherd Galatea.

== Properties ==
Ring name	Radius (km)	Width (km)	Eq. depth (km) (Note: The equivalent depth of Galle and Lassell rings is a product of their width and the normal optical depth.)	N. Opt. depth	Dust fraction,%	Ecc.	Incl.(°)	Notes
Galle (N42)	40,900–42,900	2,000	0.15	~ 10^{−4}	40–70	?	?	Broad faint ring
Le Verrier (N53)	53,200 ± 20	113	0.7 ± 0.2	6.2 ± 1.5 × 10^{–3}	40–70	?	?	Narrow ring
Lassell	53,200–57,200	4,000	0.4	~ 10^{−4}	20–40	?	?	Lassell ring is a faint sheet of material stretching from Le Verrier to Arago
Arago	57,200	<100	?	?	?	?	?	Lassell ring is a faint sheet of material stretching from Le Verrier to Arago
Adams (N63)	62,932 ± 2	15–50	0.4 1.25–2.15 (in arcs)	0.011 ± 0.003 0.03–0.09 (in arcs)	20–40 40–70 (in arcs)	4.7 ± 0.2 × 10^{–4}	0.0617 ± 0.0043	Five bright arcs

*A question mark means that the parameter is not known.

== See also ==
- Rings of Quaoar – another irregular ring system discovered by occultation
