= Plane of the Solar System =

The plane of the Solar System may refer to:

- the plane of the Ecliptic;
- the Invariable plane.
