= Despina (moon) =

Moon of Neptune

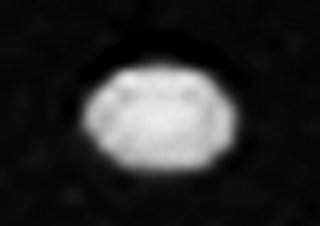
- Despina as seen by Voyager 2 (smeared horizontally)

Discovery
- Discovered by: Stephen P. Synnott and Voyager Imaging Team
- Discovery date: July 1989

Designations
- Designation: Neptune V
- Pronunciation: /dəˈspaɪnə, dəˈspiːnə, dɛ-/
- Named after: Δέσποινα Despœna
- Adjectives: Despinian

Orbital characteristics
- Epoch 1 January 2020
- Semi-major axis: 52 526 km
- Eccentricity: 0.00027
- Orbital period (sidereal): 0.3346555 d
- Mean motion: 1075.733°/d
- Inclination: 0.039° (to local Laplace plane)
- Satellite of: Neptune

Physical characteristics
- Dimensions: 180 × 148 × 128 km (± 6 × 12 × 6 km)
- Mean radius: 75±3 km
- Volume: (1.77±0.21)×10^{6} km^{3} (Note: Volume derived from the mean radius r: $\frac{4}{3}\pi r^{3}$)
- Mass: ~(0.71–1.4)×10^{18} kg (Note: Mass derived from density ρ and the volume V: $V\rho$)
- Mean density: 0.4–0.8 g/cm^{3} (Note: Derived assuming it has a similar density to that of Galatea and Proteus.)
- Surface gravity: ~0.006–0.023 m/s^{2} (Note: Surface gravity derived from the mass m, the gravitational constant G and the radius r: $\frac{Gm}{r^2}$)
- Escape velocity: ~0.032–0.054 km/s (Note: Escape velocity derived from the mass m, the gravitational constant G and the radius r: $\sqrt{\frac{2Gm}{r}}$)
- Synodic rotation period: synchronous (assumed)
- Axial tilt: zero (assumed)
- Albedo: 0.090 (geometric)
- Apparent magnitude: 22.00
- Absolute magnitude (H): 7.29

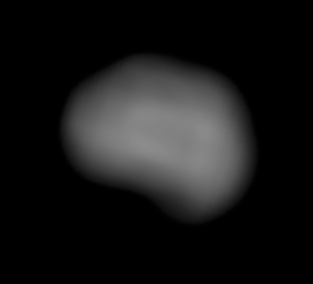
Another image of Despina as seen by Voyager 2

Despina /dɛˈspaɪnə/, also known as Neptune V, is the third-closest inner moon of Neptune. It is named after the Greek mythological character Despoina, a goddess who was a daughter of Poseidon and Demeter.

== Discovery ==
Despina was discovered in late July 1989 from the images taken by the Voyager 2 probe. It was given the temporary designation S/1989 N 3. The discovery was announced (IAUC 4824) on 2 August 1989, and mentions "10 frames taken over 5 days", implying a discovery date of sometime before July 28. The name was given on 16 September 1991.

== Physical characteristics ==
Despina's diameter is approximately 150 kilometres (93 mi). Despina is irregularly shaped and shows no sign of any geological modification. It is likely that it is a rubble pile re-accreted from fragments of Neptune's original satellites, which were disrupted by perturbations from Triton soon after that moon's capture into a very eccentric initial orbit.

Compositionally, Despina appears to be similar to other small inner Neptunian satellites, with a deep 3.0 micron feature attributed to water ice or hydrated silicate minerals. It has a 0.09 albedo at 1.4 microns, 0.1 albedo at 2.0 microns, dropping to 0.03 at 3.0 microns, and increasing to 0.07 at 4.6 microns.

== Orbit ==
Despina's orbit lies close to but outside of the orbit of Thalassa and just inside the Le Verrier ring and acts as its shepherd moon. As it is also below Neptune's synchronous orbit radius, it is slowly spiralling inward due to tidal deceleration and may eventually impact Neptune's atmosphere, or break up into a planetary ring upon passing its Roche limit due to tidal stretching.

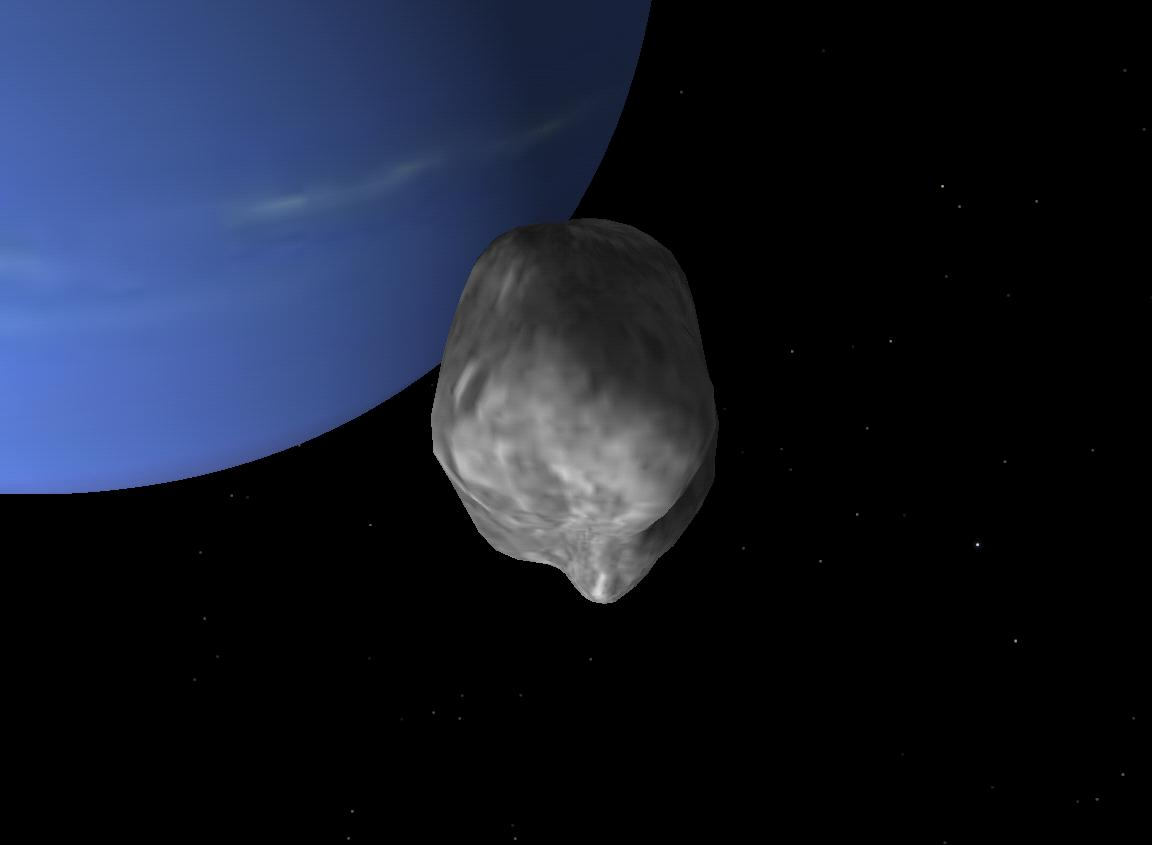
A simulated view of Despina orbiting Neptune
