= Seasons on planets =

The start and end dates of a season on any planet of the Solar System depends on same factors valid on Earth, but which have different values on different planets:

- North Pole direction (rotation axis direction)
- Vernal equinox direction
- Orbit eccentricity
- Year duration
- Orbit plane inclination

All these factors affect how much energy from Sun falls on all the points at a same given latitude (i.e. a parallel) on the planet during daytime; if such amount of energy changes during the year, the planet has seasons.

== North Pole and rotation axis ==
If the rotation axis of the planet is not perpendicular to the orbit plane, the incidence of the Sun on each point of planet surface will change during the year, which is the main reason of existence of seasons.

== Equinox direction ==
Given the different Sun incidence in different positions in the orbit, it is necessary to define a standard point of the orbit of the planet, to define the planet position in the orbit at each moment of the year w.r.t such point; this point is called with several names: vernal equinox, spring equinox, March equinox, all equivalent, and named considering Northern Hemisphere seasons. This point is defined as the point in the celestial sphere where the Sun appears in a specific moment of the year:

- the date is one of the two of the equinoxes on the planet, when daytime and nighttime are of approximately equal duration all over the planet. The word is derived from the Latin 'aequinoctium', from 'aequus' (equal) and 'nox' (genitive 'noctis') (night).
- in that date the apparent position of Sun in the sky (subsolar point) appears to leave the Southern Hemisphere and to cross the celestial equator, heading northward as seen from the planet. The date when instead the subsolar point appears to cross the equator southward is the other equinox, named autumn equinox. There are only two equinoxes in one year.

== Orbit eccentricity ==
Orbit eccentricity causes the planet/Sun distance to change during the year: The higher is the eccentricity, the higher is the change; Sun rays intensity in various moments of the year changes as the planet/Sun distance changes. Earth eccentricity is very low (0.0167 in a scale from 0 to 1.0000), hence it does not affect so much temperature changes during the year.

== Year duration ==
Conventionally one year is divided in 4 seasons, hence their duration is different if the year duration in Earth days is different.

== Data needed for the determination of planets seasons ==
=== Direction of north pole / rotation axis of Solar System planets ===
From inclination of rotation axis it depends the direction of vernal equinox.

Object	North pole			South pole		
Object	RA	Dec.	Constellation	RA	Dec.	Constellation
Sun	286.13	+63.87	Draco	106.13	−63.87	Carina
Mercury	281.01	+61.41	Draco	101.01	−61.41	Pictor
Venus	272.76	+67.16	Draco	92.76	−67.16	Dorado
Earth	—	+90.00	Ursa Minor	—	−90.00	Octans
Moon	266.86	+65.64	Draco	86.86	−65.64	Dorado
Mars	317.68	+52.89	Cygnus	137.68	−52.89	Vela
Jupiter	268.06	+64.50	Draco	88.06	−64.50	Dorado
Saturn	40.59	+83.54	Cepheus	220.59	−83.54	Octans
Uranus	257.31	−15.18	Ophiuchus	77.31	+15.18	Orion
Neptune	299.33	+42.95	Cygnus	119.33	−42.95	Puppis
	Positive pole			Negative pole		
Pluto	132.99	−6.16	Hydra	312.99	+6.16	Delphinus

=== Orbital planes inclinations ===
Body		Inclination to		
Body		Ecliptic	Sun's equator	Invariable plane
Terre- strials	Mercury	7.01°	3.38°	6.34°
Terre- strials	Venus	3.39°	3.86°	2.19°
Terre- strials	Earth	0°	7.25°	1.57°
Terre- strials	Mars	1.85°	5.65°	1.67°
Gas & ice giants	Jupiter	1.31°	6.09°	0.32°
Gas & ice giants	Saturn	2.49°	5.51°	0.93°
Gas & ice giants	Uranus	0.77°	6.48°	1.02°
Gas & ice giants	Neptune	1.77°	6.43°	0.72°
Minor planets	Pluto	17.14°	11.88°	15.55°
Minor planets	Ceres	10.59°		9.20°
Minor planets	Pallas	34.83°		34.21°
Minor planets	Vesta	5.58°		7.13°

=== Orbital eccentricities ===
Eccentricities of Solar System bodies
Body	Eccentricity
Mercury	0.2056
Venus	0.0068
Earth	0.0167
Mars	0.0934
Jupiter	0.0484
Saturn	0.0541
Uranus	0.0472
Neptune	0.0086
Pluto	0.2488

=== Synodic periods (years durations) ===
Object	Sidereal period		Synodic period	
Object	(yr)	(d)	(yr)	(d)
Mercury	0.240846	87.9691 days	0.317	115.88
Venus	0.615	224.7 days	1.599	583.9
Earth	1	365.25636 solar days	—	
Mars	1.881	687.0	2.135	779.9
Jupiter	11.86	4331	1.092	398.9
Saturn	29.46	10,747	1.035	378.1
Uranus	84.01	30,589	1.012	369.7
Neptune	164.8	59,800	1.006	367.5
134340 Pluto	248.1	90,560	1.004	366.7
Moon	0.0748	27.32 days	0.0809	29.5306
99942 Apophis (near-Earth asteroid)	0.886		7.769	2,837.6
4 Vesta	3.629		1.380	504.0
1 Ceres	4.600		1.278	466.7
10 Hygiea	5.557		1.219	445.4
2060 Chiron	50.42		1.020	372.6
50000 Quaoar	287.5		1.003	366.5
136199 Eris	557		1.002	365.9
90377 Sedna	12050		1.0001	365.3
