= Patrice Bouchet =

French astrophysicist (born 1963)

Patrice Jean Emmanuel Bouchet de Puyraimond
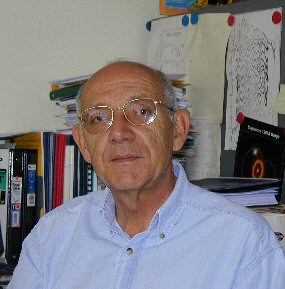
- Bouchet in 2013
- Born: 28 March 1953 (age 73); Brest, France
- Known for: Neptune's rings Mid-Infrared Observations of Supernova SN 1987A; The extinction law in the Small Magellanic Cloud
- Awards: Several "Significant Achievement Award” from NASA and ESA; "RHG Exceptional Achievement for Engineering Team to ISIM Cryo Vacuum Test Team for the James Webb Space Telescope Integrated ScienceModule", Goddard Space Flight Center, NASA
- Scientific career
- Fields: astronomy astrophysics
- Workplaces: ESO, NOAO/Aura, Inc, CEA-Saclay
- Doctoral advisor: Lodewijk Woltjer

Patrice Jean Emmanuel Bouchet de Puyraimond is a French astrophysicist best known for his discovery of the Rings of Neptune, his infrared observations of supernova SN 1987A in the Large Magellanic Cloud, and the dust extinction law in the Small Magellanic Cloud.

The minor planet (MP 4313) Bouchet was named in honor of him.
