= Magnitude of eclipse =

Fraction of the diameter of the eclipsed body which is in eclipse

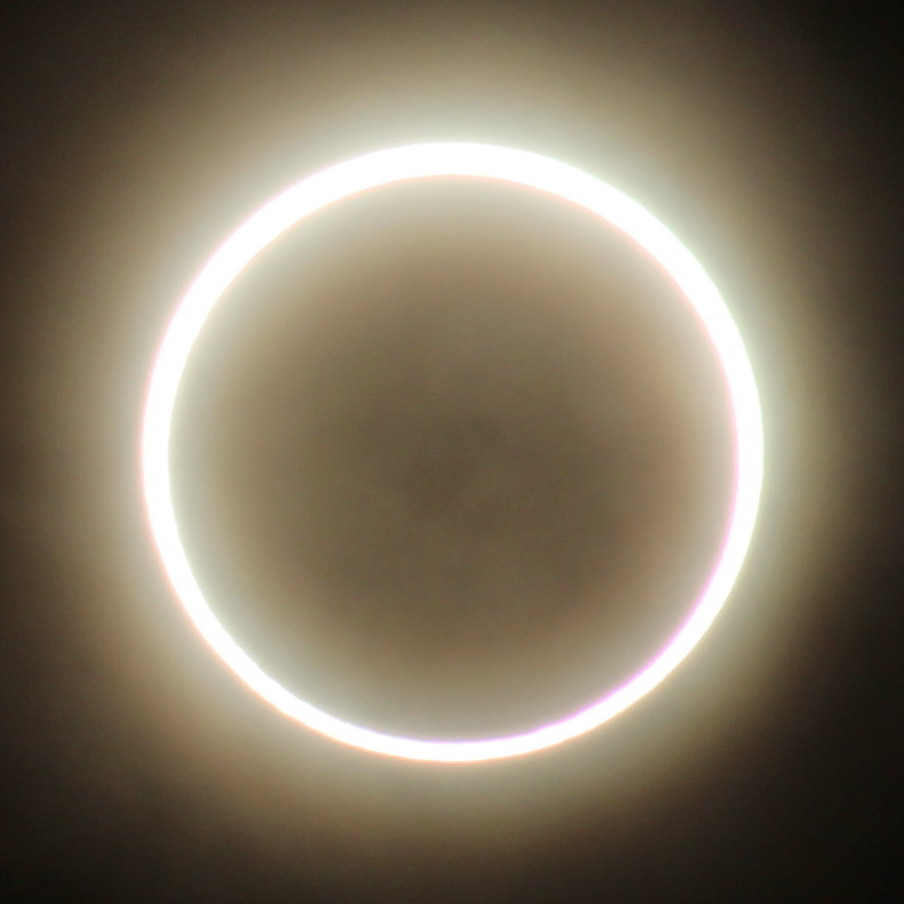
An annular solar eclipse has a magnitude of less than 1.0

The magnitude of eclipse is the fraction of the angular diameter of a celestial body being eclipsed. This applies to all celestial eclipses. The magnitude of a partial or annular solar eclipse is always between 0.0 and 1.0, while the magnitude of a total solar eclipse is always greater than or equal to 1.0, and has a theoretically maximum value of around 1.12.

This measure is strictly a ratio of diameters and should not be confused with the covered fraction of the apparent area (disk) of the eclipsed body. Neither should it be confused with the astronomical magnitude scale of apparent brightness.

== Effect of the magnitude on a solar eclipse ==
Each icon shows the view from the centre of its black spot, representing the Moon (not to scale)

The apparent sizes of the Moon and Sun are both approximately 0.5°, or 30', but both vary because the distance between Earth and Moon varies. (The distance between Earth and Sun also varies, but the effect is slight in comparison.)

In an annular solar eclipse, the magnitude of the eclipse is the ratio between the apparent angular diameters of the Moon and that of the Sun during the maximum eclipse, yielding a ratio less than 1.0. As the magnitude of eclipse is less than one, the disk of the Moon cannot completely cover the Sun. When the centers of the two disks are sufficiently aligned, a ring of sunlight remains visible around the Moon. This is called an annular eclipse, from Latin annulus, meaning "ring".

For a total solar eclipse to happen, the ratio of the apparent diameters of the Moon and of the Sun must be 1.0 or more, and the three celestial bodies (Sun, Earth and Moon) must be aligned centrally enough. When that is the case, the Moon's disk appears to cover the Sun's disk completely, as seen from the Earth. The path of totality (i.e. of the travelling shadow of the Moon cutting off all direct sunlight from reaching the Earth's surface) is a relatively narrow strip, between 100 and 200 kilometers across.

In a partial solar eclipse, the magnitude of the eclipse is the fraction of the Sun's diameter occulted by the Moon at the time of maximum eclipse. As seen from one location, the momentary eclipse magnitude varies, being exactly 0.0 at the start of the eclipse, rising to some maximum value, and then decreasing to 0.0 at the end of the eclipse. When one says "the magnitude of the eclipse" without further specification, one usually means the maximum value of the magnitude of the eclipse.

The eclipse magnitude varies not only between eclipses, but also by viewing location. An eclipse may be annular in one location and total in another. These mixed-type eclipses are called hybrid.

== Effect of the magnitude on a lunar eclipse ==
The effect on a lunar eclipse is quite similar, with a few differences. First, the eclipsed body is the Moon and the eclipsing 'body' is the Earth's shadow. Second, since the Earth's shadow at the Moon's distance always is considerably larger than the Moon, a lunar eclipse can never be annular but is always partial or total. Third, the Earth's shadow has two components: the dark umbra and the much brighter penumbra. A lunar eclipse will have two geometric magnitudes: the umbral magnitude and the penumbral magnitude. If the three bodies are not aligned enough, the Moon does not reach into the Earth's umbra - it may still pass through the Earth's penumbra though, and such an eclipse is called a penumbral eclipse.

== See also ==
- Solar eclipse
- Lunar eclipse
