= Solar eclipses on Saturn =

When moons of Saturn pass before the Sun

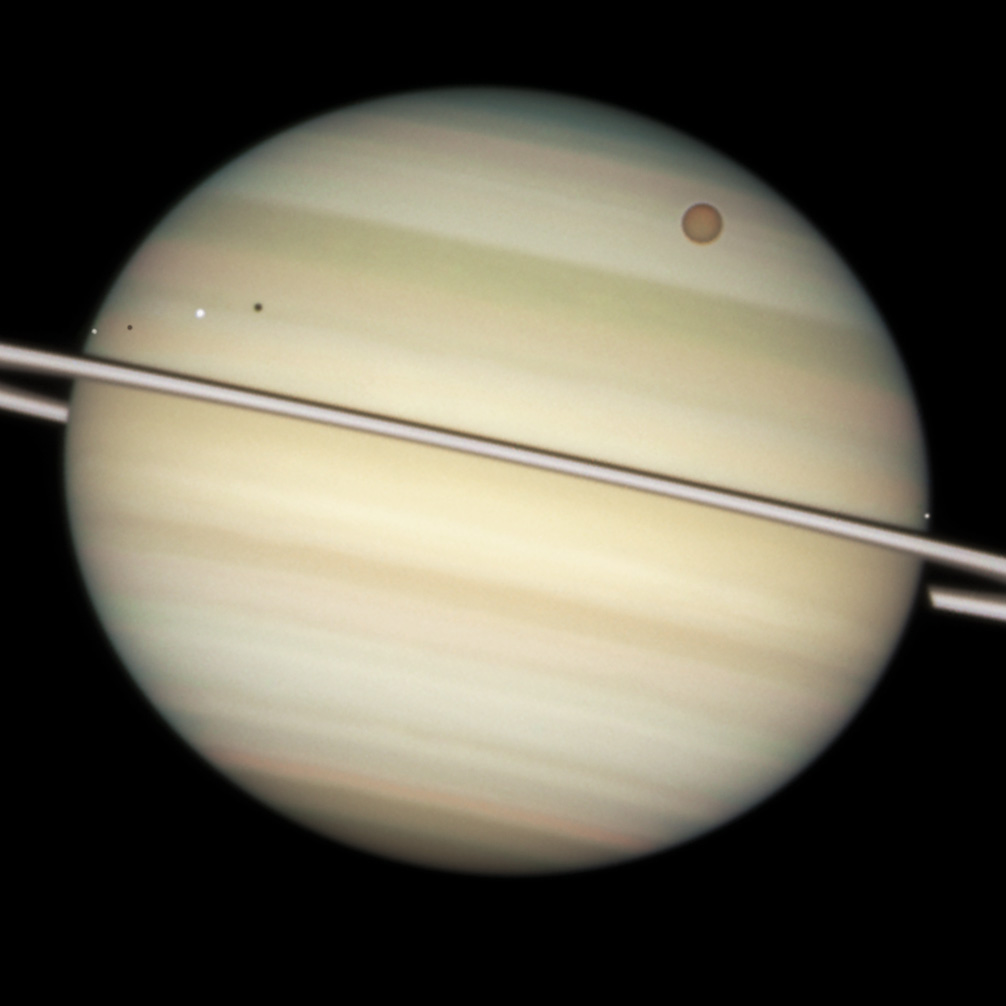
On February 24, 2009, the Hubble Space Telescope took a photo sequence of four moons of Saturn passing in front of their parent planet. In this view, the giant orange moon Titan casts a large shadow onto Saturn’s north polar hood. Below Titan, near the ring plane and to the left is the moon Mimas, casting a much smaller shadow onto Saturn’s equatorial cloud tops. Farther to the left, and off Saturn’s disk, is the bright moon Dione, and the fainter moon Enceladus.

Solar eclipses on Saturn occur when the natural satellites of Saturn pass in front of the Sun as seen from Saturn. These eclipses happen fairly often. For example, some of Saturn's moons can have a solar eclipse every day depending on the saturnian season.

For bodies which appear smaller in angular diameter than the Sun, the proper, more general term would be a transit and for those that are larger than the apparent size of the Sun, the proper term would be an occultation.

Seven of Saturn's satellites – Janus, Mimas, Enceladus, Tethys, Rhea, Dione and Titan – are large enough and near enough to eclipse or occult the Sun, or in other words to cast an umbra on Saturn. Most of the more distant satellites, besides being tiny, have orbits that are strongly inclined to the plane of Saturn's orbit, and would rarely be seen to transit.

At this distance, the sun covers only about 3 arcminutes in the sky of Saturn. In comparison, the seven major moons of Saturn have angular diameters of 5–10' (Mimas), 5–9' (Enceladus), 10–15' (Tethys), 10–12' (Dione), 8–11' (Rhea), 14–15' (Titan), and 1–2' (Iapetus). Iapetus is Saturn's third largest moon, but is too far away to completely eclipse the Sun. Janus, a very close moon to Saturn, has an angular diameter of about 7', meaning that it can fully cover the Sun.

Unlike Jupiter, Saturn has a moderate axial tilt of 26.7 degrees. This means that solar eclipses on Saturn are much more rare than solar eclipses on Jupiter.
