= Naiad (moon) =

Moon of Neptune

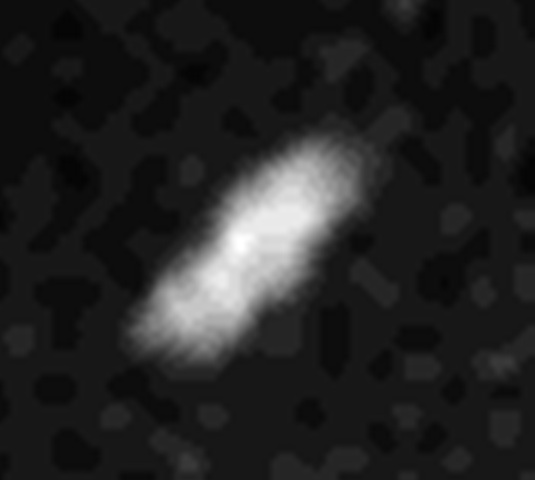
- Naiad as seen by Voyager 2 (elongation is due to smearing)

Discovery
- Discovered by: Voyager Imaging Team
- Discovery date: September 1989

Designations
- Designation: Neptune III
- Pronunciation: /ˈneɪəd/ or /ˈnaɪæd/, /ˈneɪəd/ or /ˈnaɪəd/
- Named after: pl. Ναϊάδες Nāïades
- Adjectives: Naiadian /-ˈædiən/

Orbital characteristics
- Epoch 1 January 2020
- Semi-major axis: 48,228 km
- Eccentricity: 0.00014
- Orbital period (sidereal): 0.2943923 d
- Mean motion: 1222.858°/d
- Inclination: 4.728° (to local Laplace plane)
- Satellite of: Neptune

Physical characteristics
- Dimensions: 96 × 60 × 52 km (± 8 × 16 × 8 km)
- Mean radius: 33±3 km
- Volume: (1.51±0.41)×10^{5} km^{3} (Note: Calculated from its mean radius.)
- Mass: (1.20±0.64)×10^{17} kg (Note: Calculated from its standard gravitational parameter GM = 0.0080±0.0043 km^{3}/s^{2}.)
- Mean density: 0.80±0.48 g/cm^{3}
- Synodic rotation period: synchronous (assumed)
- Axial tilt: zero (assumed)
- Albedo: 0.072 (geometric)
- Apparent magnitude: 23.91
- Absolute magnitude (H): 9.20

Naiad /ˈneɪəd/, (also known as Neptune III and previously designated as S/1989 N 6) named after the naiads of Greek legend, is the innermost satellite of Neptune and the nearest to the center of any gas giant with moons with a distance of 48,224 km from the planet's center. Its orbital period is less than a Neptunian day, resulting in tidal dissipation that will cause its orbit to decay. Eventually it will either crash into Neptune's atmosphere or break up to become a new ring.

== History ==
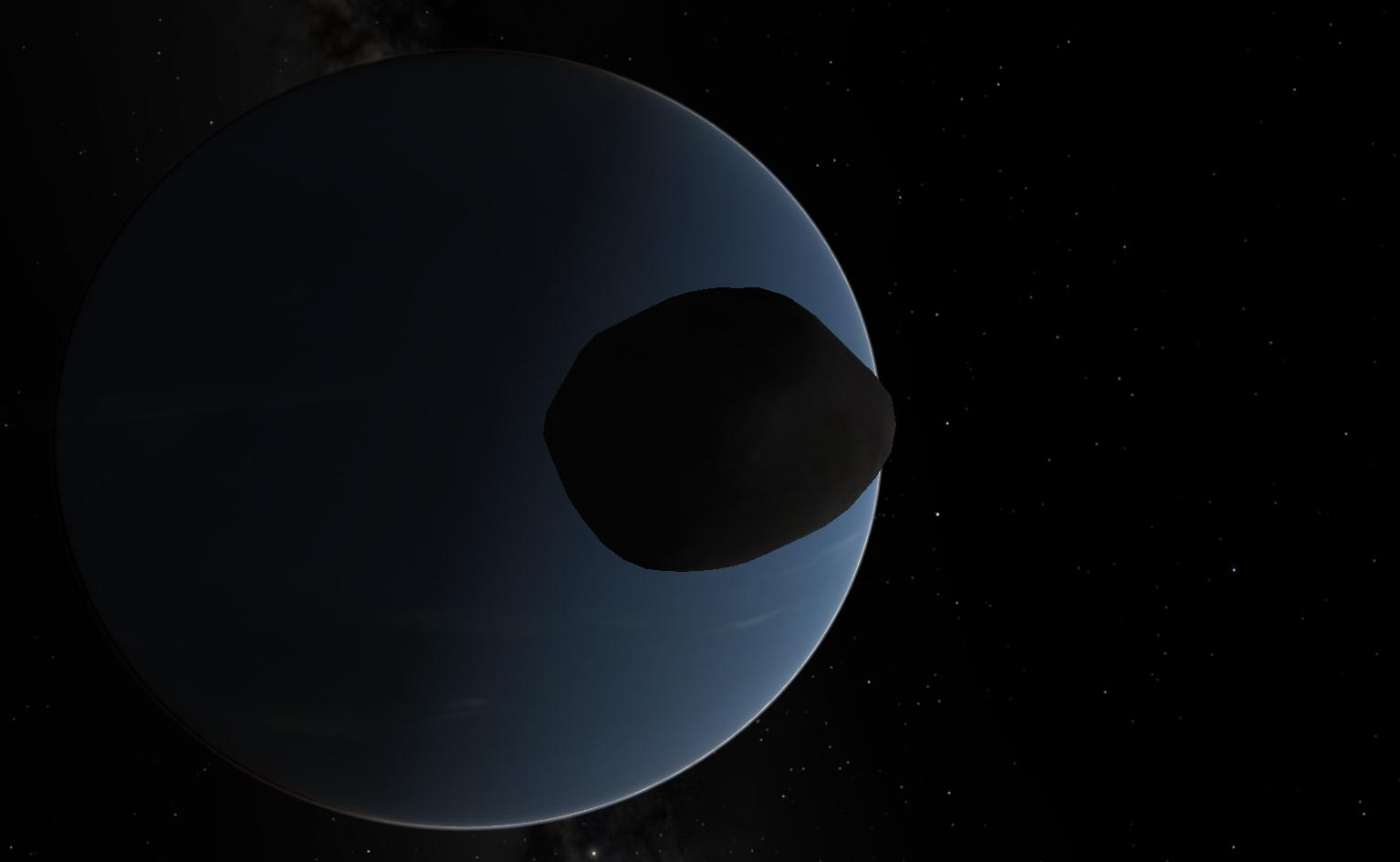
Simulated view of Naiad

Naiad was discovered sometime before mid-September 1989 from the images taken by the Voyager 2 probe. The last moon to be discovered during the flyby, it was designated S/1989 N 6. The discovery was announced on 29 September 1989, in the IAU Circular No. 4867, and mentions "25 frames taken over 11 days", implying a discovery date of sometime before 18 September. The name was given on 16 September 1991.

== Physical characteristics ==
Naiad is irregularly shaped. It is likely that it is a rubble pile re-accreted from fragments of Neptune's original satellites, which were smashed up by perturbations from Triton soon after that moon's capture into a very eccentric initial orbit.

== Orbit ==
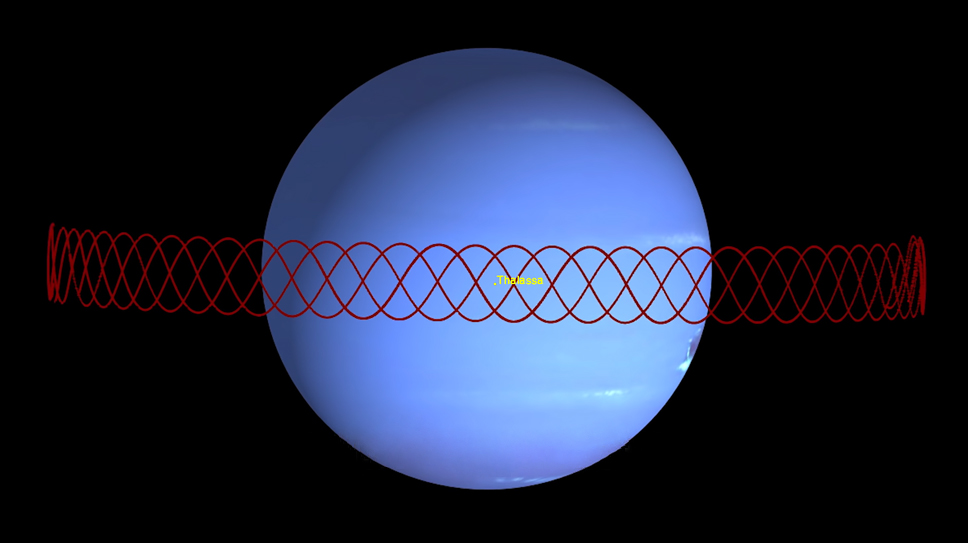
Depiction of Naiad's orbital motion (red) in a view that co-rotates with Thalassa (central yellow dot)

Naiad is in a 73:69 orbital resonance with the next outward moon, Thalassa, in a "dance of avoidance". As it orbits Neptune, the more inclined Naiad successively passes Thalassa twice from above and then twice from below, in a cycle that repeats every ~21.5 Earth days. The two moons are about 3540 km apart when they pass each other. Although their orbital radii differ by only 1850 km, Naiad swings ~2800 km above or below Thalassa's orbital plane at closest approach. Thus this resonance, like many such orbital correlations, serves to stabilize the orbits by maximizing separation at conjunction. However, the role of orbital inclination in maintaining this avoidance in a case where eccentricities are minimal is unusual.

== Exploration ==
Since the Voyager 2 flyby, the Neptune system has been extensively studied from ground-based observatories and the Hubble Space Telescope as well. In 2002–03 the Keck telescope observed the system using adaptive optics and detected easily the largest four inner satellites. Thalassa was found with some image processing, but Naiad was not located. Hubble has the ability to detect all the known satellites and possible new satellites even dimmer than those found by Voyager 2. On 8 October 2013 the SETI Institute announced that Naiad had been located in archived Hubble imagery from 2004. The suspicion that the loss of positioning was due to considerable errors in Naiad's ephemeris proved correct as Naiad was ultimately located 80 degrees from its expected position.
