= Thalassa (moon) =

Moon of Neptune

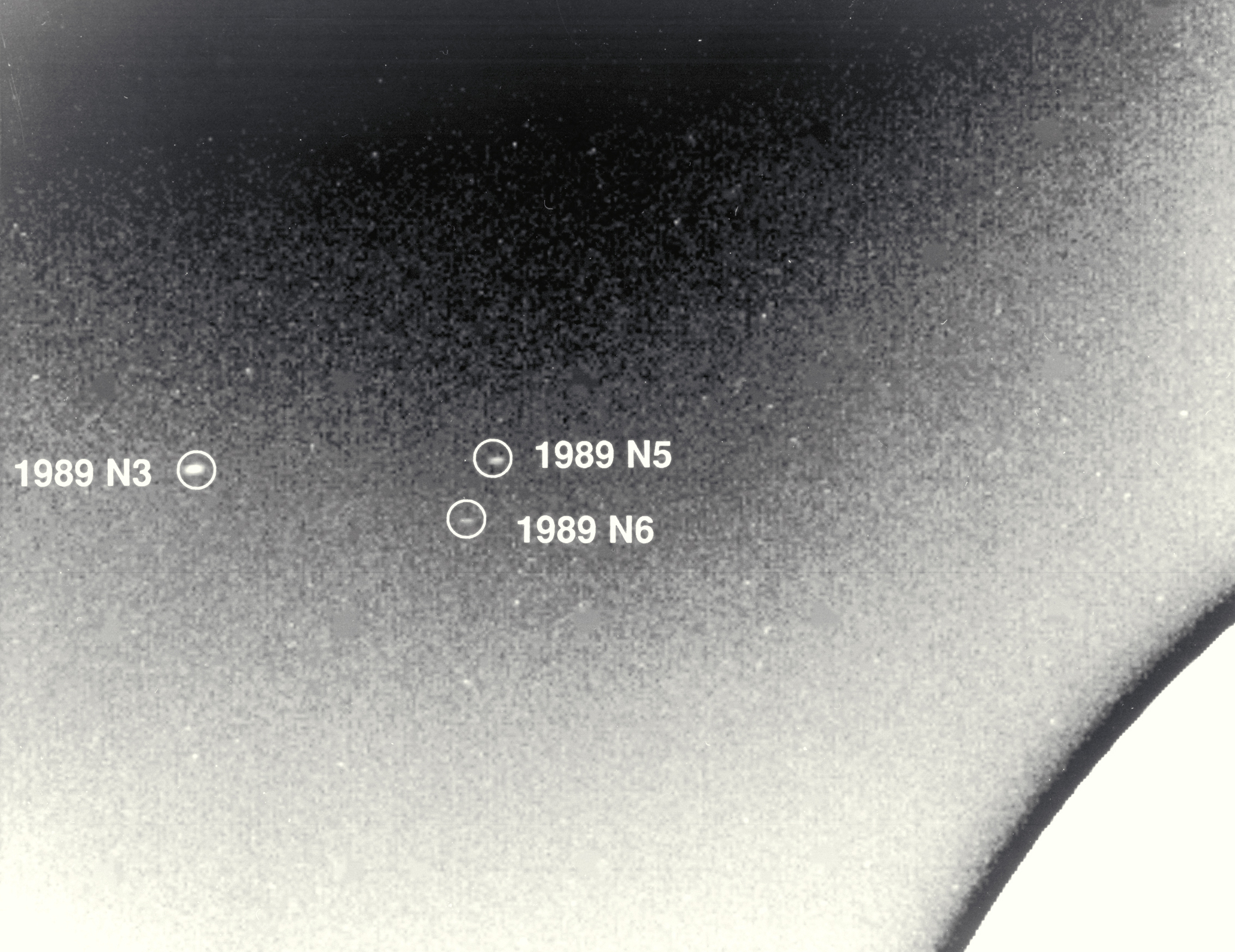
- Thalassa (1989 N5) seen by Voyager 2 on 23 August 1989

Discovery
- Discovered by: Richard J. Terrile and Voyager Imaging Team
- Discovery date: September 1989

Designations
- Designation: Neptune IV
- Pronunciation: /θəˈlæsə/
- Named after: Θάλασσα Thalassa
- Adjectives: Thalassian /θəˈlæsiən/

Orbital characteristics
- Epoch 1 January 2020
- Semi-major axis: 50075 km
- Eccentricity: 0.00019
- Orbital period (sidereal): 0.3114836 d
- Mean motion: 1155.759°/d
- Inclination: 0.168° (to local Laplace plane)
- Satellite of: Neptune

Physical characteristics
- Dimensions: 108 × 100 × 52 km (± 6 × 12 × 6 km)
- Mean radius: 41±3 km
- Volume: (2.89±0.63)×10^{5} km^{3} (Note: Calculated from its mean radius.)
- Mass: (3.54±0.96)×10^{17} kg (Note: Calculated from its standard gravitational parameter GM = 0.0236±0.0064 km^{3}/s^{2}.)
- Mean density: 1.23±0.43 g/cm^{3}
- Synodic rotation period: synchronous (assumed)
- Axial tilt: zero (assumed)
- Albedo: 0.091 (geometric)
- Apparent magnitude: 23.32
- Absolute magnitude (H): 8.61

Thalassa /θəˈlæsə/, also known as Neptune IV, is the second-innermost satellite of Neptune. Thalassa was named after sea goddess Thalassa, a daughter of Aether and Hemera from Greek mythology. "Thalassa" is also the Greek word for "sea".

== Discovery ==
Thalassa was discovered sometime before mid-September 1989 from the images taken by the Voyager 2 probe. It was given the temporary designation S/1989 N 5. The discovery was announced (IAUC 4867) on 29 September 1989, and mentions "25 frames taken over 11 days", implying a discovery date of sometime before 18 September. The name was given on 16 September 1991.

== Physical properties ==
Thalassa is irregularly shaped. It is likely that it is a rubble pile re-accreted from fragments of Neptune's original satellites, which were smashed up by perturbations from Triton soon after that moon's capture into a very eccentric initial orbit. Unusually for irregular bodies, it appears to be roughly disk-shaped.

== Orbit ==
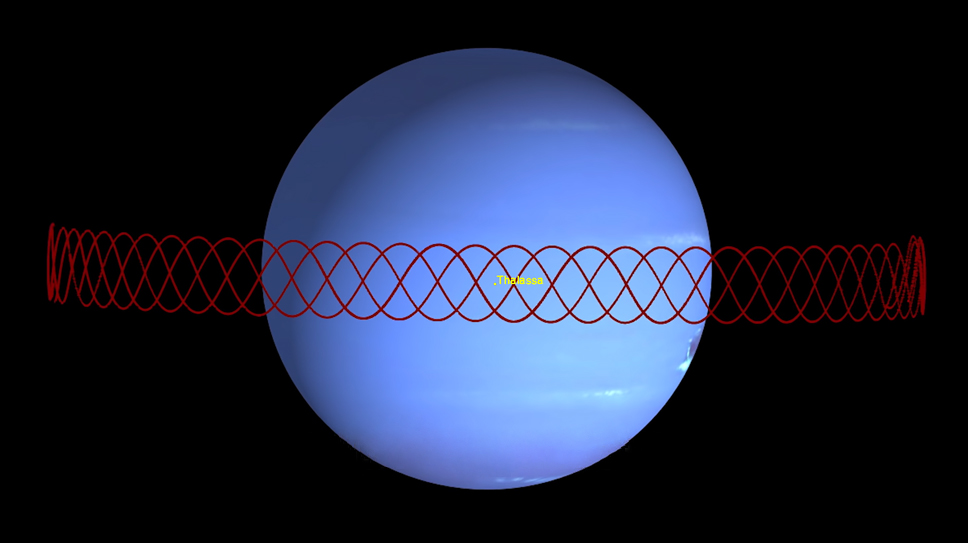
Depiction of Naiad's orbital motion (red) in a view that co-rotates with Thalassa (central yellow dot)

Since the Thalassian orbit is below Neptune's synchronous orbit radius, it is slowly spiralling inward due to tidal deceleration and may eventually impact Neptune's atmosphere, or break up into a planetary ring upon passing its Roche limit due to tidal stretching. Relatively soon after, the spreading debris may impinge upon Despina's orbit.

Thalassa is currently in a 69:73 orbital resonance with the innermost moon, Naiad, in a "dance of avoidance". As it orbits Neptune, the more inclined Naiad successively passes Thalassa twice from above and then twice from below, in a cycle that repeats every ~21.5 Earth days. The two moons are about 3540 km apart when they pass each other. Although their orbital radii differ by only 1850 km, Naiad swings ~2800 km above or below Thalassa's orbital plane at closest approach. Thus this resonance, like many such orbital correlations, stabilizes the orbits by maximizing separation at conjunction. However, the role of Naiad's nearly 5° orbital inclination in this avoidance in a situation where eccentricities are minimal is unusual.
