= Galatea (moon) =

Moon of Neptune

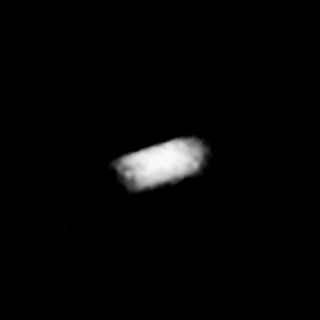
- Galatea as seen by Voyager 2 (elongation is due to smearing)

Discovery
- Discovered by: Stephen P. Synnott and Voyager Imaging Team
- Discovery date: July 1989

Designations
- Designation: Neptune VI
- Pronunciation: /ɡæləˈtiːə/
- Named after: Γαλάτεια Galateia
- Adjectives: Galatean

Orbital characteristics
- Epoch 1 January 2020
- Semi-major axis: 61953 km
- Eccentricity: 0.00020
- Orbital period (sidereal): 0.428744 d
- Mean motion: 839.661°/d
- Inclination: 0.010° (to local Laplace plane)
- Satellite of: Neptune

Physical characteristics
- Dimensions: 204 × 184 × 144 km (± 10 × 16 × 8 km)
- Mean radius: 88±4 km
- Volume: (2.85±0.39)×10^{6} km^{3} (Note: Volume derived from the mean radius r: $\frac{4}{3}\pi r^{3}$)
- Mass: (2.12±0.08)×10^{18} kg
- Mean density: 0.74±0.11 g/cm^{3} (Note: Density derived from the mass m and the volume V: $\frac{m}{V}$)
- Surface gravity: ~0.014–0.027 m/s^{2} (Note: Surface gravity derived from the mass m, the gravitational constant G and the radius r: $\frac{Gm}{r^2}$)
- Escape velocity: ~0.053–0.063 km/s (Note: Escape velocity derived from the mass m, the gravitational constant G and the radius r: $\sqrt{\frac{2Gm}{r}}$)
- Synodic rotation period: synchronous (assumed)
- Axial tilt: zero (assumed)
- Albedo: 0.079 (geometric)
- Apparent magnitude: 21.85
- Absolute magnitude (H): 7.14

Galatea /ɡæləˈtiːə/, also known as Neptune VI, is the fourth-closest inner moon of Neptune, and fifth-largest moon of Neptune. It is named after Galatea, one of the fifty Nereids of Greek legend, with whom Cyclops Polyphemus was vainly in love.

== Discovery ==
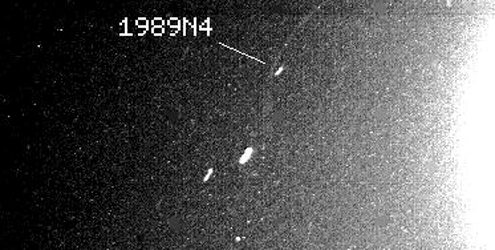
Galatea inside of a faint ring arc near Neptune

Galatea was discovered in late July 1989 from the images taken by the Voyager 2 probe. It was given the temporary designation S/1989 N 4. The discovery was announced (IAUC 4824) on 2 August 1989, and mentions "10 frames taken over 5 days", implying a discovery date of sometime before July 28. The name was given on 16 September 1991.

== Physical properties ==
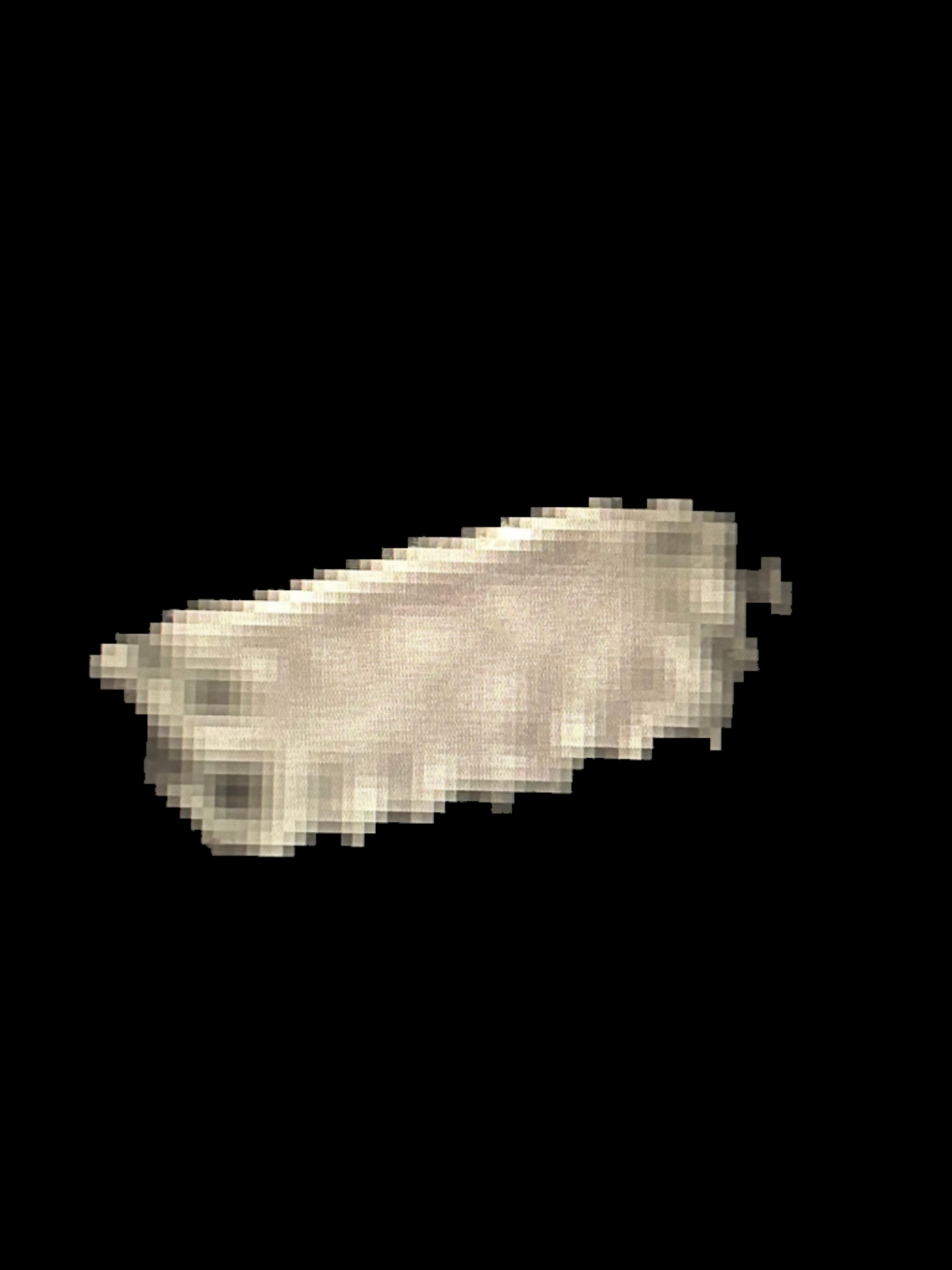
False Color of Galatea, processed to show a bit more detail.

Galatea is irregularly shaped and shows no sign of any geological modification. It is likely that it is a rubble pile re-accreted from fragments of Neptune's original satellites, which were smashed up by perturbations from Triton soon after that moon's capture into a very eccentric initial orbit.

Compositionally, Galatea appears to be similar to other small inner Neptunian satellites, with a deep 3.0 micron feature attributed to water ice or hydrated silicate minerals.

Galatea's surface contains hydrated materials, as evidenced by a deep 3-μm OH band, phyllosilicates, and lacks clear signatures of water ice, suggesting that its composition may resemble carbonaceous chondrites and main belt asteroids such as Ceres. The presence of phyllosilicates indicate that Galatea accreted materials which was altered by prolonged exposure to water at temperatures between less than 300 to 400 K, and the bulk of this material have never been exposed to temperatures greater than 700 K, which would have dehydrated it. Its surface albedo is 0.08 albedo at 1.4 and 2.0 microns, dropping to 0.04 at 3.0 microns, and increasing to 0.12 at 4.6 microns.

== Orbit ==
Galatea's orbit lies below Neptune's synchronous orbit radius, so it is slowly spiralling inward due to tidal deceleration and may eventually impact the planet or break up into a new planetary ring system upon passing its Roche limit due to tidal stretching.

Galatea appears to be a shepherd moon for the Adams ring that is 1,000 kilometres (620 mi) outside its orbit. Resonances with Galatea in the ratio 42:43 are also considered the most likely mechanism for confining the unique ring arcs that exist in this ring. Galatea's mass has been estimated at (2.12±0.08)×10^{18} kg based on the radial perturbations it induces on the ring.
