= Solar eclipses on Uranus =

When moons of Uranus pass before the Sun

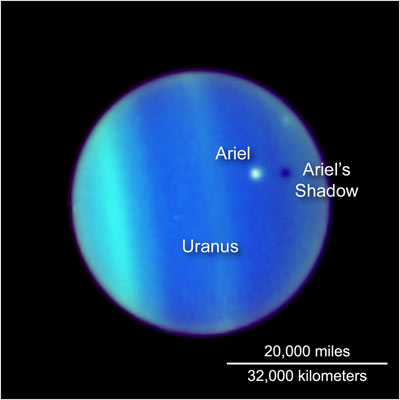
HST image from July 26, 2006, of Ariel transiting Uranus, complete with shadow

Solar eclipses on Uranus occur when any of the natural satellites of Uranus passes in front of the Sun as seen from Uranus. Eclipses can occur only near a solar ring plane-crossing of Uranus (equinox), occurring approximately every 42 years, with the last crossing being in 2007/2008.

For bodies that appear smaller in angular diameter than the Sun, the proper term would be a transit and bodies that are larger than the apparent size of the Sun, the proper term would be an occultation.

Twelve satellites of Uranus—Cressida, Desdemona, Juliet, Portia, Rosalind, Belinda, Puck, Miranda, Ariel, Umbriel, Titania and Oberon—are large enough and near enough to eclipse the Sun.

All other satellites of Uranus are too small or too distant to produce an umbra.

At its distance from the Sun, the Sun's angular diameter is reduced to a tiny disk about 2 arcminutes across. The angular diameters of the moons large enough to fully eclipse the sun are: Cressida, 6–8'; Desdemona, 6–7'; Juliet, 10–12'; Portia, 9–13'; Rosalind, 4–5'; Belinda, 6–8'; Puck, 6–8'; Miranda, 10–15'; Ariel, 20–23'; Umbriel, 15–17'; Titania, 11–13'; Oberon, 8–9'.
