= Invariable plane =

Plane passing through the barycenter of a planetary system

The invariable plane of a planetary system, also called Laplace's invariable plane, is the plane passing through its barycenter (center of mass) perpendicular to its angular momentum vector.

== Terminology and definition ==
This plane is sometimes called the "Laplacian" or "Laplace plane" or the "invariable plane of Laplace", though it should not be confused with the Laplace plane, which is the plane about which the individual orbital planes of planetary satellites precess. Both derive from the work of (and are at least sometimes named for) the French astronomer Pierre-Simon Laplace. The two are equivalent only in the case where all perturbers and resonances are far from the precessing body. The invariable plane is derived from the sum of angular momenta, and is "invariable" over the entire system, while the Laplace plane for different orbiting objects within a system may be different. Laplace called the invariable plane the plane of maximum areas, where the "area" in this case is the product of the radius R and its time rate of change ( d R )/( d t ), that is, its radial velocity, multiplied by the mass.

The magnitude of the orbital angular momentum vector of a planet is $L = R^2 M \dot{\theta}$, where $R$ is the orbital radius of the planet (from the barycenter), $M$ is the mass of the planet, and $\dot{\theta}$ is its orbital angular velocity.

== Solar System ==
Body		Inclination to		
Body		Ecliptic	Sun's equator	Invariable plane
Terre- strials	Mercury	7.01°	3.38°	6.34°
Terre- strials	Venus	3.39°	3.86°	2.19°
Terre- strials	Earth	0°	7.25°	1.57°
Terre- strials	Mars	1.85°	5.65°	1.67°
Gas & ice giants	Jupiter	1.31°	6.09°	0.32°
Gas & ice giants	Saturn	2.49°	5.51°	0.93°
Gas & ice giants	Uranus	0.77°	6.48°	1.02°
Gas & ice giants	Neptune	1.77°	6.43°	0.72°
Minor planets	Pluto	17.14°	11.88°	15.55°
Minor planets	Ceres	10.59°		9.20°
Minor planets	Pallas	34.83°		34.21°
Minor planets	Vesta	5.58°		7.13°

In the Solar System, about 98% of this effect is contributed by the orbital angular momenta of the four giant planets (Jupiter, Saturn, Uranus, and Neptune). The invariable plane is within 0.5° of the orbital plane of Jupiter, calculated at 0.3219°, and may be regarded as the weighted average of all planetary orbital and rotational planes.

Jupiter contributes the bulk of the Solar System's angular momentum, 60.3%. Then comes Saturn at 24.5%, Neptune at 7.9%, and Uranus at 5.3%. The Sun forms a counterbalance to all of the planets, so it is near the barycenter when Jupiter is on one side and the other three jovian planets are diametrically opposite on the other side, but the Sun moves to 2.17 R_{☉} away from the barycenter when all jovian planets are in line on the other side. The orbital angular momenta of the Sun and all non-jovian planets, moons, and small Solar System bodies, as well as the axial rotation momenta of all bodies, including the Sun, total only about 2%.

If all Solar System bodies were point masses, or were rigid bodies having spherically symmetric mass distributions, and further if there were no external effects due to the uneven gravitation of the Milky Way Galaxy, then an invariable plane defined on orbits alone would be truly invariable and would constitute an inertial frame of reference. But almost all are not, allowing the transfer of a very small amount of momenta from axial rotations to orbital revolutions due to tidal friction and to bodies being non-spherical. This causes a change in the magnitude of the orbital angular momentum, as well as a change in its direction (precession) because the rotational axes are not parallel to the orbital axes.

Nevertheless, these changes are exceedingly small compared to the total angular momentum of the system, which is very nearly conserved despite these effects. For almost all purposes, the plane defined from the giant planets' orbits alone can be considered invariable when working in Newtonian dynamics, by also ignoring the even tinier amounts of angular momentum ejected in material and gravitational waves leaving the Solar System, and the extremely small torques exerted on the Solar System by other stars passing nearby, Milky Way galactic tides, etc.

Change in inclination to the invariable plane of the giant planets
Year	Jupiter	Saturn	Uranus	Neptune
2009	0.32°	0.93°	1.02°	0.72°
142400	0.48°	0.79°	1.04°	0.55°
168000	0.23°	1.01°	1.12°	0.55°
