= Solar eclipses on Jupiter =

When moons of Jupiter pass before the Sun

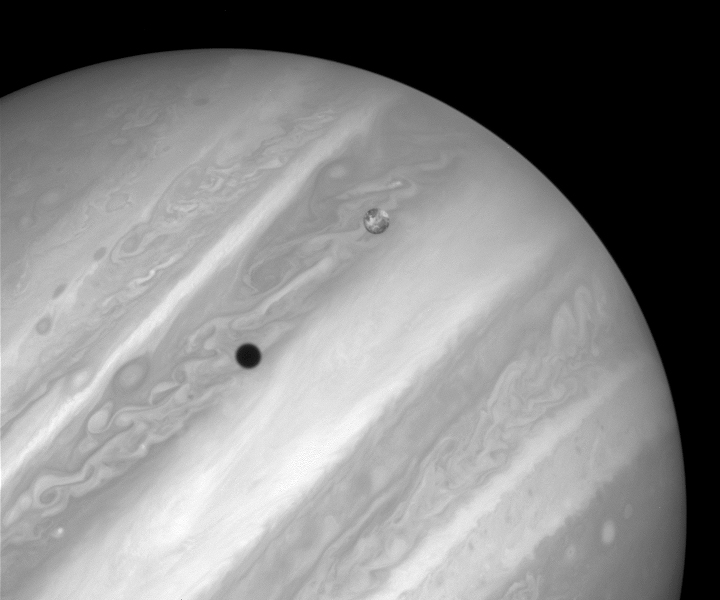
A picture of Jupiter and its moon Io taken by the Hubble Space Telescope. The black spot is Io's shadow.

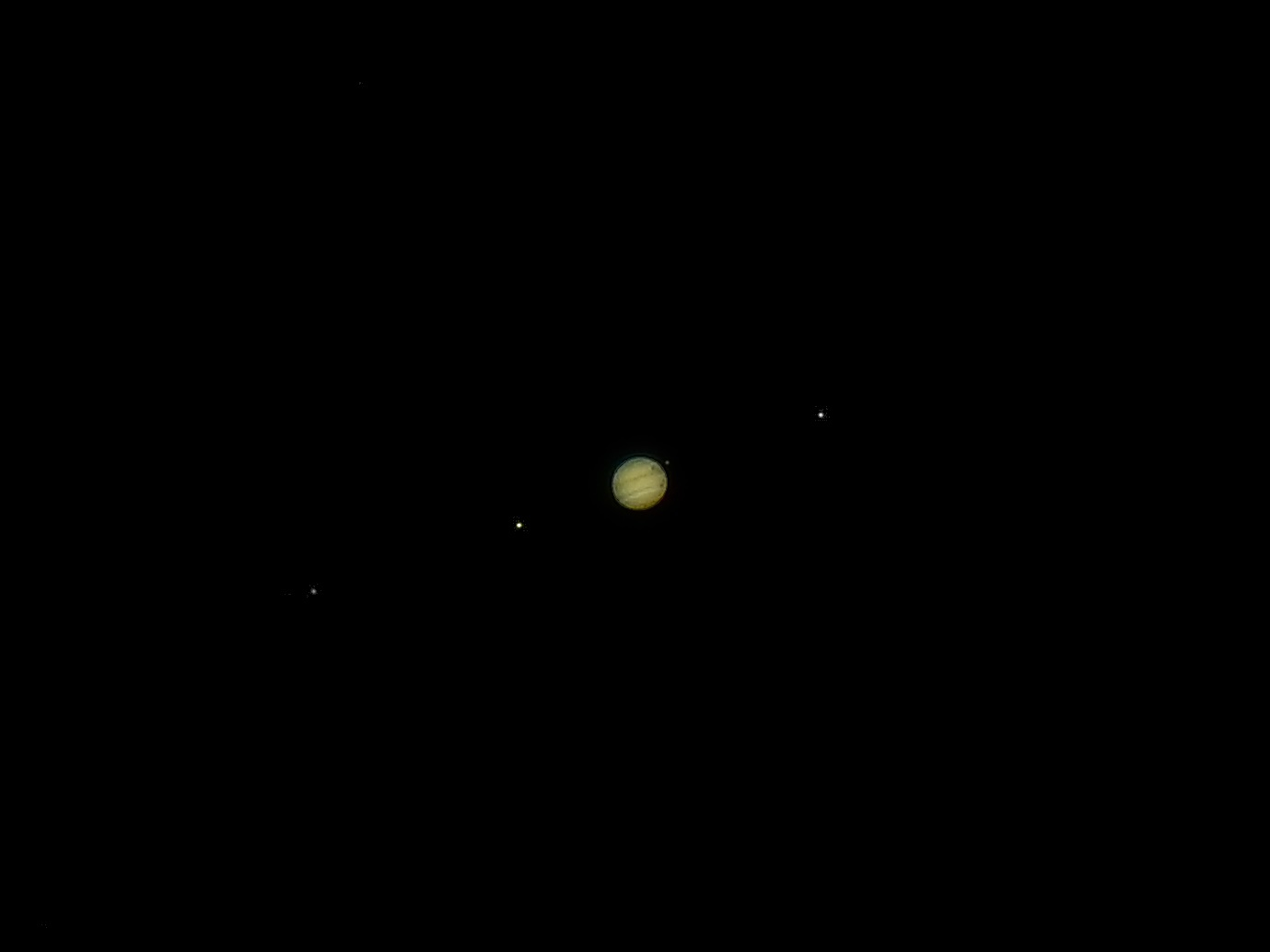
Jupiter and the Great Red Spot (visible on the lower right), with Ganymede (immediately on the upper right) casting its shadow on Jupiter. The other moons are Europa (further right), Io (first on left), and Callisto (furthest on left). Photo taken with Nikon P900 on 24 July 2020, ten days after opposition.

Solar eclipses on Jupiter occur when any of the natural satellites of Jupiter pass in front of the Sun as seen from the planet Jupiter.

For bodies that appear smaller in angular diameter than the Sun, the proper term would be a transit. For bodies that are larger than the apparent size of the Sun, the proper term would be an occultation.

There are four satellites capable of completely occulting the Sun: Io, Europa, Ganymede and Callisto. All of the others are too small or too distant to be able to completely occult the Sun, so can only transit the Sun. Most of the more distant satellites also have orbits that are strongly inclined to the plane of Jupiter's orbit, and would rarely be seen transiting Jupiter.

When the four largest satellites of Jupiter, the Galilean satellites, occult the Sun, a shadow transit can be seen on the surface of Jupiter which can be observed from Earth in telescopes.

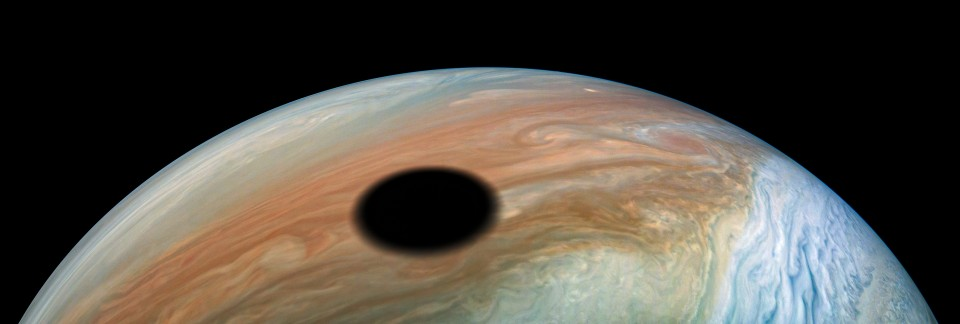
Io shadow on Jupiter.

Eclipses of the Sun from Jupiter are not particularly rare, since Jupiter is very large and its axial tilt (which is related to the plane of the orbits of its satellites) is relatively small—indeed, the vast majority of the orbits of all four of the objects capable of occulting the Sun will result in a solar occultation visible from somewhere on Jupiter, with every satellite except Callisto guaranteed to produce an eclipse on every orbit.

The related phenomenon of satellite eclipses in the shadow of Jupiter has been observed since the time of Giovanni Cassini and Ole Rømer in the mid Seventeenth Century. It was soon noticed that predicted times differed from observed times in a regular way, varying from up to ten minutes early to up to ten minutes late. Rømer correctly realized that the variations were caused by the varying distance between Earth and Jupiter as the two planets moved in their orbits around the Sun. Later, in 1678, Christiaan Huygens used these errors to make the first accurate determination of the speed of light.

Spacecraft can be used to observe the solar eclipses on Jupiter; these include Pioneer 10 and Pioneer 11 (1973 and 1974), Voyager 1 and Voyager 2 (1979), Galileo orbiter (1995–2003), Cassini–Huygens (2000), New Horizons (2007), and Juno (2016-present) observed the transits of their moons and its shadows.

== Visibility from Jupiter ==
The mean angular diameter of the Sun as viewed from Jupiter is 372 arc-seconds, or 6' 12" (about 1/5 that of the Sun as viewed from Earth), varying slightly from 381" at perihelion to 357" at aphelion. Unlike the near coincidence of the apparent sizes of the Moon and Sun as viewed from Earth, this perspective exaggerates the apparent diameters of all the Galilean moons in comparison to the Sun. Even distant Callisto is over 50% larger, and Io is nearly six times as large. This disparity in angular size makes the moons' shadows on Jupiter more defined than the lunar shadow on Earth during a total solar eclipse, as it narrows the penumbra for a given distance.

== Gallery ==
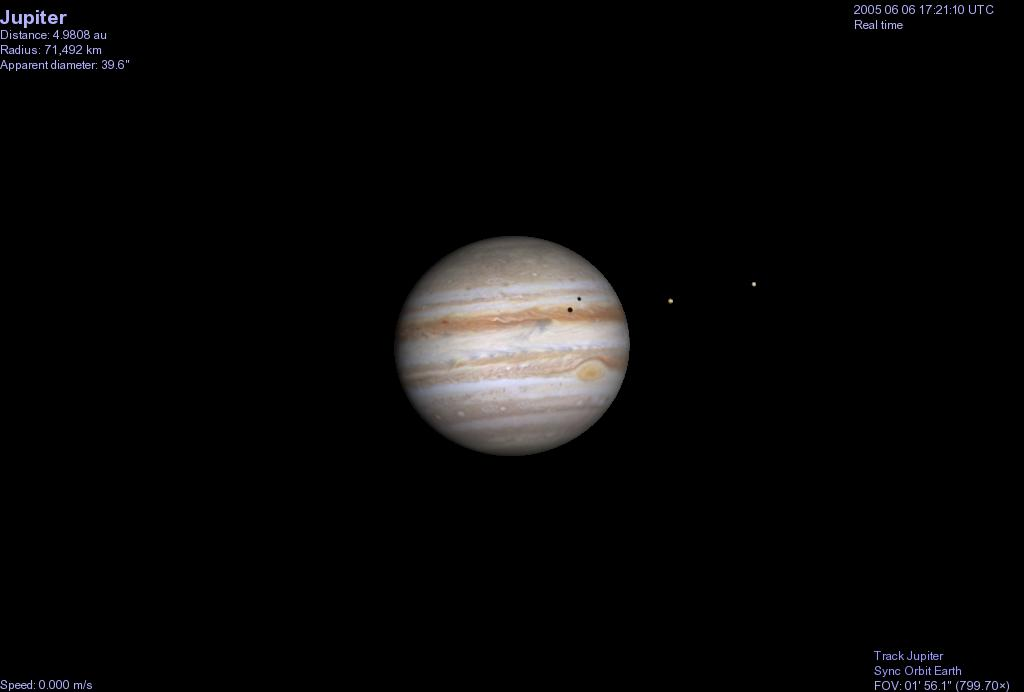
A computer-generated image using Celestia showing a double shadow transit on Jupiter. The two satellites visible, Io and Europa, just to the right of the planet, are responsible for the shadows.

A simulated view of an Io transit of Jupiter as viewed from the Earth, showing the shadow apparently leading Io.
