= Laplace plane =

The Laplace plane or Laplacian plane of a planetary satellite, named after its discoverer Pierre-Simon Laplace (1749–1827), is a mean or reference plane about whose axis the instantaneous orbital plane of that satellite precesses.

Laplace's name is sometimes applied to the invariable plane, which is the plane perpendicular to a system's mean angular momentum vector, but the two should not be confused. They are equivalent only in the case where all perturbers and resonances are far from the precessing body.

== Definition ==
The axis of this Laplace plane is coplanar with, and between, (a) the polar axis of the parent planet's spin, and (b) the orbital axis of the parent planet's orbit around the Sun. The Laplace plane arises because the equatorial oblateness of the parent planet tends to cause the orbit of the satellite to precess around the polar axis of the parent planet's equatorial plane, while the solar perturbations tend to cause the orbit of the satellite to precess around the polar axis of the parent planet's orbital plane around the Sun. The two effects acting together result in an intermediate position for the reference axis for the satellite orbit's precession.

== Explanation ==
In effect, this is the plane normal to the orbital precession pole of the satellite. It is a kind of "average orbital plane" of the satellite, around which the instantaneous orbital plane of the satellite precesses, and to which it has a constant additional inclination.

In most cases, the Laplace plane is very close to the equatorial plane of its primary planet (if the satellite is very close to its planet) or to the plane of the primary planet's orbit around the Sun (if the satellite is far away from its planet). This is because the strength of the planet's perturbation on the satellite's orbit is much stronger for orbits close to the planet, but drops below the strength of the Sun's perturbation for orbits farther away.

Examples of satellites whose Laplace plane is close to their planet's equatorial plane include the satellites of Mars and the inner satellites of the giant planets. Examples of satellites whose Laplace plane is close to their planet's orbital plane include Earth's Moon and the outer satellites of the giant planets such as Phoebe. Some satellites, such as Saturn's Iapetus, are situated in the transitional zone and have Laplace planes that are midway between their planet's equatorial plane and the plane of its solar orbit.

So the varying positions of the Laplace plane at varying distances from the primary planet can be pictured as putting together a warped or non-planar surface, which may be pictured as a series of concentric rings whose orientation in space is variable: the innermost rings are near the equatorial plane of rotation and oblateness of the planet, and the outermost rings near its solar orbital plane. Also, in some cases, larger satellites of a planet (such as Neptune's Triton) can affect the Laplace planes of smaller satellites orbiting the same planet.

== The work of Laplace ==
The Laplace or Laplacean plane, as discussed here, relates to the orbit of a planetary satellite. It is to be distinguished from another and quite different plane, also discovered by Laplace, and which is also sometimes called the "Laplacian" or "Laplace plane", but more often the invariable plane (or the "invariable plane of Laplace"). The invariable plane is simply derived from the sum of angular momenta, and is "invariable" over the entire system, while the Laplace plane may be different for different orbiting objects within a system. Confusingly, a satellite's Laplace plane (as defined here) is also sometimes called its "invariable plane".

The Laplace plane is a result of perturbational effects, which were discovered by Laplace while he was investigating the orbits of Jupiter's principal moons (the Galilean satellites of Jupiter, the only ones known in Laplace's time). Laplace found that the effects of the solar perturbing force, and of the planet's oblateness (its equatorial bulge), together gave rise to an "inclinaison propre", an "own inclination", in the plane of the satellite orbits, relative to the plane of Jupiter's equator.
