= Kozai =

Kozai may refer to:

- Kozai-Lidov mechanism, a dynamical phenomenon in celestial mechanics
- 3040 Kozai, an asteroid

== Persons with the surname Kozai ==
- Yoshihide Kozai (1928–2018), Japanese astronomer
- Kazuteru Kozai (born 1986), Japanese badminton player
- Kaori Kozai (born 1963), Japanese singer
- Takeshi Kozai (1974–2006), Japanese judoka

== See also ==
- Kosai (disambiguation)
- Kōzai Station
