= Lidov =

Lidov may refer to the following:

- Mikhail Lidov (1926-1993), Soviet space scientist;
- Alexei Lidov (born 1959), Russian art historian, son of Mikhail Lidov;
- Arthur Lidov (1917-1990), American artist, illustrator, muralist, sculptor and inventor;
- 4236 Lidov, asteroid named after Mikhail Lidov;
