= Stellar rotation =

Angular motion of a star about its axis

This illustration shows the oblate appearance of the star Achernar caused by rapid rotation.

Stellar rotation is the angular motion of a star about its axis. The rate of rotation can be measured from the spectrum of the star, or by timing the movements of active features on the surface.

The rotation of a star produces an equatorial bulge due to centrifugal force. As stars are not solid bodies, they can also undergo differential rotation. Thus the equator of the star can rotate at a different angular velocity than the higher latitudes. These differences in the rate of rotation within a star may have a significant role in the generation of a stellar magnetic field.

In its turn, the magnetic field of a star interacts with the stellar wind. As the wind moves away from the star its angular speed decreases. The magnetic field of the star interacts with the wind, which applies a drag to the stellar rotation. As a result, angular momentum is transferred from the star to the wind, and over time this gradually slows the star's rate of rotation.

== Measurement ==
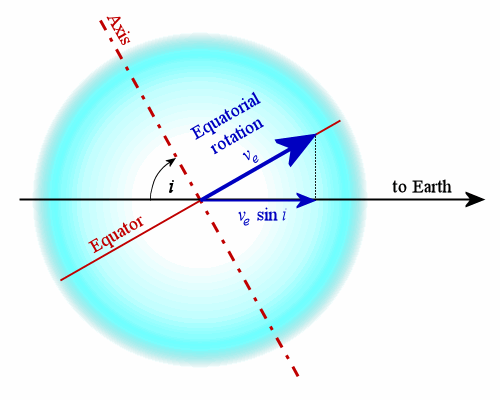
This star has inclination $i$ to the line-of-sight of an observer on the Earth and rotational velocity v_{e} at the equator.

Unless a star is being observed from the direction of its pole, sections of the surface have some amount of movement toward or away from the observer. The component of movement that is in the direction of the observer is called the radial velocity. For the portion of the surface with a radial velocity component toward the observer, the radiation is shifted to a higher frequency because of Doppler shift. Likewise the region that has a component moving away from the observer is shifted to a lower frequency. When the absorption lines of a star are observed, this shift at each end of the spectrum causes the line to broaden. However, this broadening must be carefully separated from other effects that can increase the line width.

The component of the radial velocity observed through line broadening depends on the inclination of the star's pole to the line of sight. The derived value is given as $v_\mathrm{e} \cdot \sin i$, where $v_\mathrm{e}$ is the rotational velocity at the equator and $i$ is the inclination. However, $i$ is not always known, so the result gives a minimum value for the star's rotational velocity. That is, if $i$ is not a right angle, then the actual velocity is greater than $v_\mathrm{e} \cdot \sin i$. This is sometimes referred to as the projected rotational velocity. In fast rotating stars polarimetry offers a method of recovering the actual velocity rather than just the rotational velocity; this technique has so far been applied only to Regulus.

For giant stars, the atmospheric microturbulence can result in line broadening that is much larger than effects of rotational, effectively drowning out the signal. However, an alternate approach can be employed that makes use of gravitational microlensing events. These occur when a massive object passes in front of the more distant star and functions like a lens, briefly magnifying the image. The more detailed information gathered by this means allows the effects of microturbulence to be distinguished from rotation.

If a star displays magnetic surface activity such as starspots, then these features can be tracked to estimate the rotation rate. However, such features can form at locations other than equator and can migrate across latitudes over the course of their life span, so differential rotation of a star can produce varying measurements. Stellar magnetic activity is often associated with rapid rotation, so this technique can be used for measurement of such stars. Observation of starspots has shown that these features can actually vary the rotation rate of a star, as the magnetic fields modify the flow of gases in the star.

== Physical effects ==
=== Equatorial bulge ===
Gravity tends to contract celestial bodies into a perfect sphere, the shape where all the mass is as close to the center of gravity as possible. But a rotating star is not spherical in shape, it has an equatorial bulge.

As a rotating proto-stellar disk contracts to form a star its shape becomes more and more spherical, but the contraction doesn't proceed all the way to a perfect sphere. At the poles all of the gravity acts to increase the contraction, but at the equator the effective gravity is diminished by the centrifugal force. The final shape of the star after star formation is an equilibrium shape, in the sense that the effective gravity in the equatorial region (being diminished) cannot pull the star to a more spherical shape. The rotation also gives rise to gravity darkening at the equator, as described by the von Zeipel theorem.

An extreme example of an equatorial bulge is found on the star Regulus A (α Leonis A). The equator of this star has a measured rotational velocity of 317 ± 3 km/s. This corresponds to a rotation period of 15.9 hours, which is 86% of the velocity at which the star would break apart. The equatorial radius of this star is 32% larger than polar radius. Other rapidly rotating stars include Alpha Arae, Pleione, Vega and Achernar.

The break-up velocity of a star is an expression that is used to describe the case where the centrifugal force at the equator is equal to the gravitational force. For a star to be stable the rotational velocity must be below this value.

=== Differential rotation ===
Surface differential rotation is observed on stars such as the Sun when the angular velocity varies with latitude. Typically the angular velocity decreases with increasing latitude. However the reverse has also been observed, such as on the star designated HD 31993. The first such star, other than the Sun, to have its differential rotation mapped in detail is AB Doradus.

The underlying mechanism that causes differential rotation is turbulent convection inside a star. Convective motion carries energy toward the surface through the mass movement of plasma. This mass of plasma carries a portion of the angular velocity of the star. When turbulence occurs through shear and rotation, the angular momentum can become redistributed to different latitudes through meridional flow.

The interfaces between regions with sharp differences in rotation are believed to be efficient sites for the dynamo processes that generate the stellar magnetic field. There is also a complex interaction between a star's rotation distribution and its magnetic field, with the conversion of magnetic energy into kinetic energy modifying the velocity distribution.

== Rotation braking ==
=== During formation ===
Stars are believed to form as the result of a collapse of a low-temperature cloud of gas and dust. As the cloud collapses, conservation of angular momentum causes any small net rotation of the cloud to increase, forcing the material into a rotating disk. At the dense center of this disk a protostar forms, which gains heat from the gravitational energy of the collapse.

As the collapse continues, the rotation rate can increase to the point where the accreting protostar can break up due to centrifugal force at the equator. Thus the rotation rate must be braked during the first 100,000 years to avoid this scenario. One possible explanation for the braking is the interaction of the protostar's magnetic field with the stellar wind in magnetic braking. The expanding wind carries away the angular momentum and slows down the rotation rate of the collapsing protostar.

Average rotational velocities
Stellar class	v_{e} (km/s)
O5	190
B0	200
B5	210
A0	190
A5	160
F0	95
F5	25
G0	12

Most main-sequence stars with a spectral class between O5 and F5 have been found to rotate rapidly. For stars in this range, the measured rotation velocity increases with mass. This increase in rotation peaks among young, massive B-class stars. "As the expected life span of a star decreases with increasing mass, this can be explained as a decline in rotational velocity with age."

=== After formation ===
For main-sequence stars, the decline in rotation can be approximated by a mathematical relation:

$$\Omega_\mathrm{e} \propto t^{-\frac{1}{2}},$$

where $\Omega_\mathrm{e}$ is the angular velocity at the equator and $t$ is the star's age. This relation is named Skumanich's law after Andrew P. Skumanich who discovered it in 1972. Gyrochronology is the determination of a star's age based on the rotation rate, calibrated using the Sun.

Stars slowly lose mass by the emission of a stellar wind from the photosphere. The star's magnetic field exerts a torque on the ejected matter, resulting in a steady transfer of angular momentum away from the star. Stars with a rate of rotation greater than 15 km/s also exhibit more rapid mass loss, and consequently a faster rate of rotation decay. Thus as the rotation of a star is slowed because of braking, there is a decrease in rate of loss of angular momentum. Under these conditions, stars gradually approach, but never quite reach, a condition of zero rotation.

=== At the end of the main sequence ===
Ultracool dwarfs and brown dwarfs experience faster rotation as they age, due to gravitational contraction. These objects also have magnetic fields similar to the coolest stars. However, the discovery of rapidly rotating brown dwarfs such as the T6 brown dwarf WISEPC J112254.73+255021.5 lends support to theoretical models that show that rotational braking by stellar winds is over 1000 times less effective at the end of the main sequence.

== Close binary systems ==
A close binary star system occurs when two stars orbit each other with an average separation that is of the same order of magnitude as their diameters. At these distances, more complex interactions can occur, such as tidal effects, transfer of mass and even collisions. Tidal interactions in a close binary system can result in modification of the orbital and rotational parameters. The total angular momentum of the system is conserved, but the angular momentum can be transferred between the orbital periods and the rotation rates.

Each of the members of a close binary system raises tides on the other through gravitational interaction. However the bulges can be slightly misaligned with respect to the direction of gravitational attraction. Thus the force of gravity produces a torque component on the bulge, resulting in the transfer of angular momentum (tidal acceleration). This causes the system to steadily evolve, although it can approach a stable equilibrium. The effect can be more complex in cases where the axis of rotation is not perpendicular to the orbital plane.

For contact or semi-detached binaries, the transfer of mass from a star to its companion can also result in a significant transfer of angular momentum. The accreting companion can spin up to the point where it reaches its critical rotation rate and begins losing mass along the equator.

== Degenerate stars ==
After a star has finished generating energy through thermonuclear fusion, it evolves into a more compact, degenerate state. During this process the dimensions of the star are significantly reduced, which can result in a corresponding increase in angular velocity.

=== White dwarf ===
A white dwarf is a star that consists of material that is the by-product of thermonuclear fusion during the earlier part of its life, but lacks the mass to burn those more massive elements. It is a compact body that is supported by a quantum mechanical effect known as electron degeneracy pressure that will not allow the star to collapse any further. Generally most white dwarfs have a low rate of rotation, most likely as the result of rotational braking or by shedding angular momentum when the progenitor star lost its outer envelope. (See planetary nebula.)

A slow-rotating white dwarf star can not exceed the Chandrasekhar limit of 1.44 solar masses without collapsing to form a neutron star or exploding as a Type Ia supernova. Once the white dwarf reaches this mass, such as by accretion or collision, the gravitational force would exceed the pressure exerted by the electrons. If the white dwarf is rotating rapidly, however, the effective gravity is diminished in the equatorial region, thus allowing the white dwarf to exceed the Chandrasekhar limit. Such rapid rotation can occur, for example, as a result of mass accretion that results in a transfer of angular momentum.

=== Neutron star ===
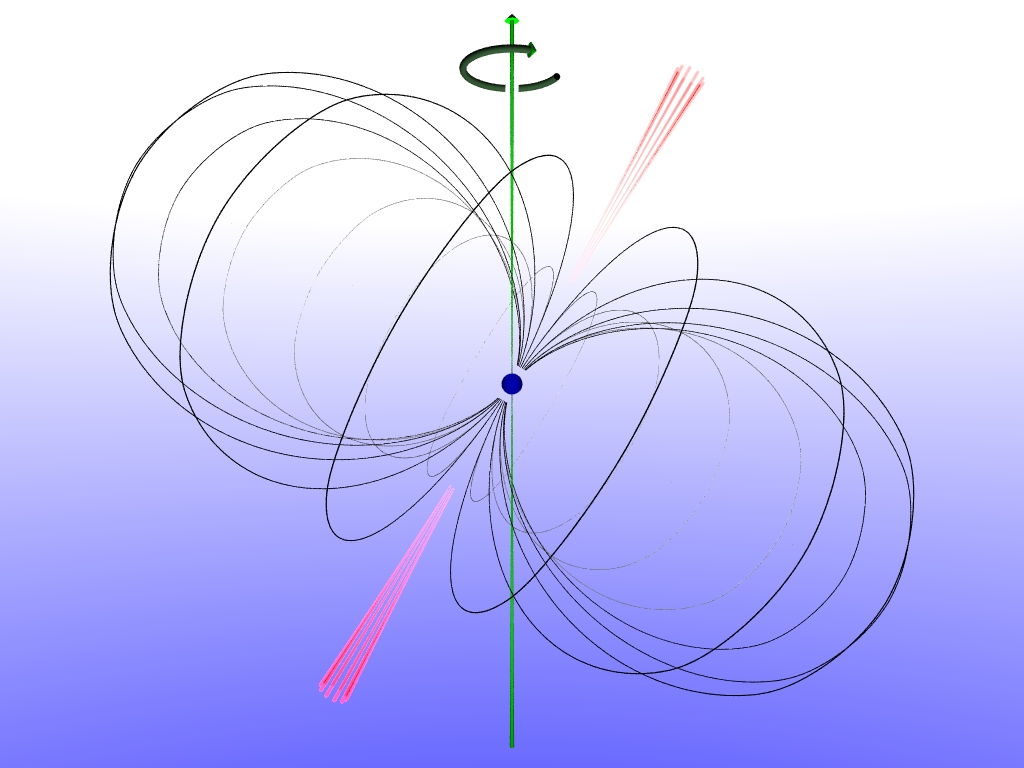
The neutron star (center) emits a beam of radiation from its magnetic poles. The beams are swept along a conic surface around the axis of rotation.

A neutron star is a highly dense remnant of a star that is primarily composed of neutrons—a particle that is found in most atomic nuclei and has no net electrical charge. The mass of a neutron star is in the range of 1.2 to 2.1 times the mass of the Sun. As a result of the collapse, a newly formed neutron star can have a very rapid rate of rotation; on the order of a hundred rotations per second.

Pulsars are rotating neutron stars that have a magnetic field. A narrow beam of electromagnetic radiation is emitted from the poles of rotating pulsars. If the beam sweeps past the direction of the Solar System then the pulsar will produce a periodic pulse that can be detected from the Earth. The energy radiated by the magnetic field gradually slows down the rotation rate, so that older pulsars can require as long as several seconds between each pulse.

=== Black hole ===
A black hole is an object with a gravitational field that is sufficiently powerful that it can prevent light from escaping. When they are formed from the collapse of a rotating mass, they retain all of the angular momentum that is not shed in the form of ejected gas. This rotation causes the space within an oblate spheroid-shaped volume, called the ergosphere, to be dragged around with the black hole. Mass falling into this volume gains energy by this process and some portion of the mass can then be ejected without falling into the black hole. When the mass is ejected, the black hole loses angular momentum (the "Penrose process").

== See also ==
- Rossiter–McLaughlin effect
