= S/2021 N 1 =

Outermost moon of Neptune

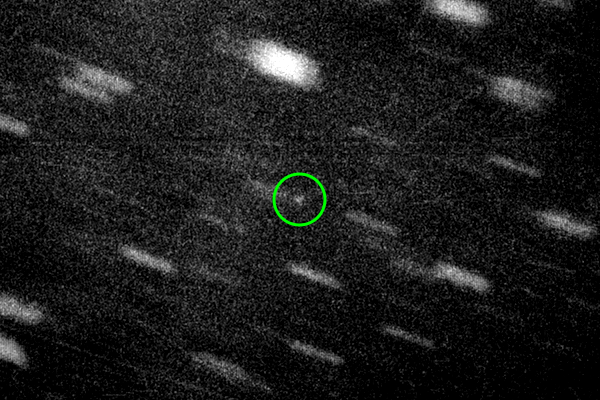
- S/2021 N 1 as seen by the Gemini North telescope on 3 November 2023 (Note: This image of S/2021 N 1 was created by taking 15 photos from the Gemini North telescope, shifting the photos' relative positions to follow the moon's motion, and then combining all the photos into a single stack where the brightness is averaged out to isolate the moon's signal from the image noise. The result is S/2021 N 1 appearing as a single dot, while the background stars that move relative to the moon appear trailed.)

Discovery
- Discovered by: Scott S. Sheppard; David J. Tholen; Chad Trujillo; Patryk S. Lykawka
- Discovery site: Mauna Kea Obs.
- Discovery date: 7 September 2021

Orbital characteristics
- Epoch 1 January 2020 (JD 2458849.5)
- Observation arc: 2.16 yr (788 d)
- Satellite of: Neptune
- Group: Neso group

Proper orbital elements
- Proper semi-major axis: 50,700,200 km (0.338910 AU)
- Proper eccentricity: 0.503
- Proper inclination: 135.2° (to ecliptic)
- Proper orbital period: 27.50 years (10,043 d)
- Precession of asc. node: 1402.42893 arcsec / yr

Physical characteristics
- Mean diameter: 16–25 km (Note: The diameter (in km) is calculated from absolute magnitude (H) and geometric albedo (p) according to the formula $D = \frac{1329}{\sqrt{p}} \times 10^{-0.2H}$. Given H = 12.1 and assuming an albedo range of 0.04–0.10, the diameter range is 16–25 km.); 14 km
- Apparent magnitude: 27 (average)
- Absolute magnitude (H): 12.1

S/2021 N 1 is the smallest, faintest, and farthest natural satellite or moon of Neptune known, with a diameter of around 16–25 km (10–16 mi). It was discovered on 7 September 2021 by Scott S. Sheppard, David J. Tholen, Chad Trujillo, and Patryk S. Lykawka using the 8.2-meter Subaru Telescope at Mauna Kea, Hawaii, and later announced on 23 February 2024. It is an irregular moon, meaning it follows a very wide and elliptical orbit around its planet. It orbits Neptune in the retrograde direction at an average distance of over 50 million km (31 million mi) and takes about 27 Earth years to complete one orbit—the largest orbital distance and period of any known moon in the Solar System.

== Discovery ==
S/2021 N 1 was first observed on 7 September 2021 by Scott S. Sheppard and collaborators, during their search for Neptunian irregular moons with the 8.2-m Subaru Telescope at Mauna Kea, Hawaii. Sheppard's team was able to detect this faint moon through the shift-and-add technique, in which they took many long-exposure telescope images, aligned and shifted them to follow Neptune's motion, and then added them together to create a single deep image that would show Neptunian moons as points of light against trailed background stars and galaxies. Applying the shift-and-add technique to very large aperture telescopes like Subaru enabled Sheppard's team to probe deeper than previous Neptunian irregular moon surveys.

From September 2021 to November 2023, Sheppard's conducted follow-up observations of S/2021 N 1 using other large-aperture telescopes around the world, which included the 6.5-m Magellan–Baade Telescope at Las Campanas Observatory, the 8.2-m Very Large Telescope at European Southern Observatory, and the 8.1-m Gemini North Telescope at Mauna Kea Observatory to determine the moon's orbit and ensure it would not be lost. S/2021 N 1 and S/2002 N 5, another Neptunian irregular moon discovered by Sheppard's team, were both confirmed and announced by the Minor Planet Center on 23 February 2024, bringing Neptune's number of known moons from 14 to 16.

== Orbit ==
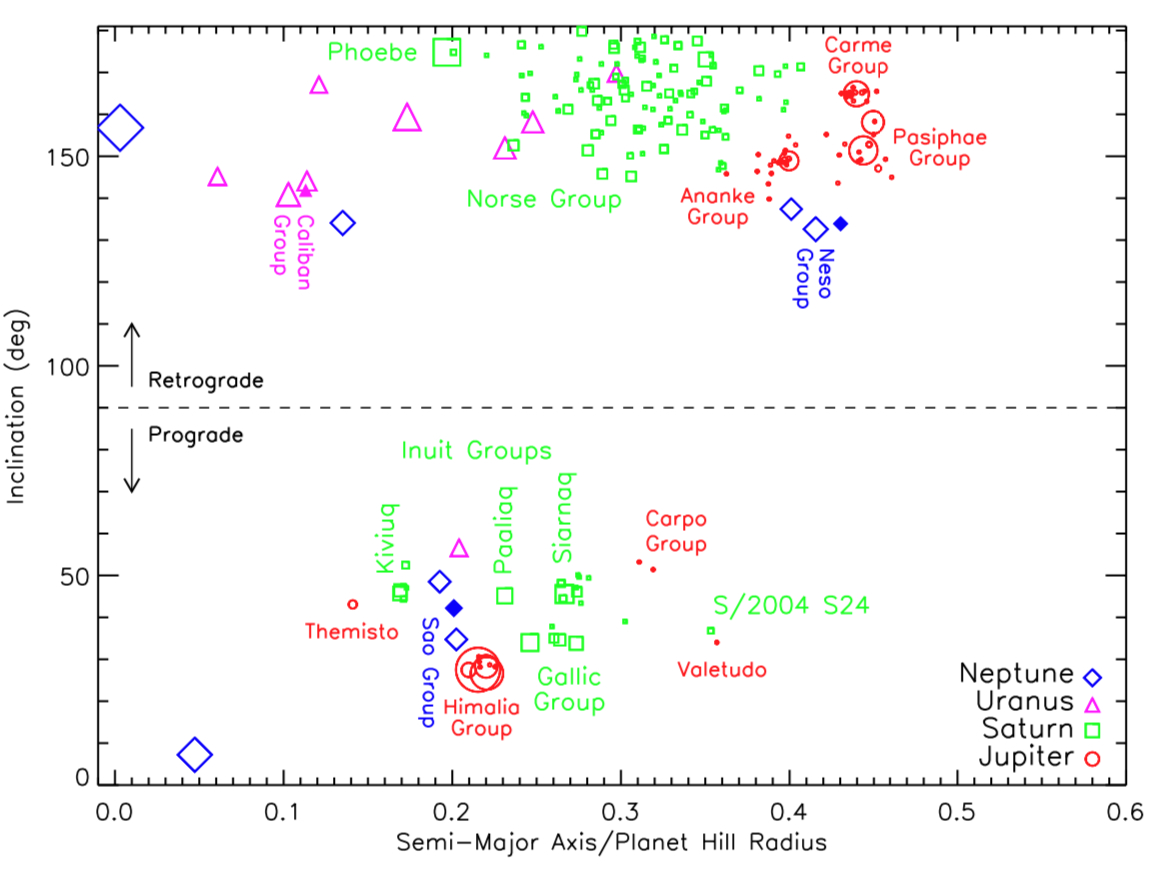
Irregular satellites of all four giant planets, plotted by average distance from their planet (semi-major axis in Hill radii) and orbital inclination (degrees with respect to ecliptic). S/2021 N 1 is the farthest irregular moon of Neptune (the rightmost blue diamond). Data as of February 2024.

S/2021 N 1 is an irregular moon of Neptune, since it has a distant, highly elliptical, and highly inclined orbit. Irregular moons are loosely bound by Neptune's gravity because of their great distance from the planet, so their orbits are frequently perturbed by the gravity of the Sun and other planets. This results in significant changes in the orbits of irregular moons over short periods of time, so a simple Keplerian elliptical orbit cannot accurately describe the long-term orbital motions of irregular moons. Namely, during an 800-year time span from 1600 to 2400, S/2021 N 1's semi-major axis fluctuates between 49 and 53 million km (30 and 33 million mi), eccentricity between 0.32 and 0.70, and inclination between 129° and 139°. For this reason, proper or average orbital elements are used to describe the long-term orbits of irregular moons more accurately, since these are calculated by averaging out the perturbed orbit over a long period of time.

Over an 800-year time span from 1600 to 2400, S/2021 N 1's average semi-major axis or orbital distance from Neptune is 50.7 million km (31.5 million mi; 0.339 AU), with an average orbital period of 27.5 Earth years. S/2021 N 1 has an average orbital eccentricity of 0.50 and an average inclination of 135° with respect to the ecliptic, or the plane of Earth's orbit. Since S/2021 N 1's orbital inclination is greater than 90°, the moon has a retrograde orbit, meaning it orbits in the opposite direction of Neptune's orbit around the Sun. S/2021 N 1's average semi-major axis and orbital period are greater than those of Neptune's moon Neso (49.9 million km; 26.8 yr), which makes S/2021 N 1 hold the record for the largest orbital distance and period of any known moon in the Solar System. For comparison, the planet Mercury has a semi-major axis of 57.9 million km (36.0 million mi; 0.387 AU) from the Sun, which is about 14% larger than S/2021 N 1's average semi-major axis from Neptune. S/2021 N 1's extreme orbital distance is possible thanks to the large size of Neptune's Hill sphere of gravitational influence, which spans about 115 million km (71 million mi; 0.77 AU) in radius. S/2021 N 1's average semi-major axis takes up about 44% of Neptune's Hill radius, although the Jovian moons of the Carme and Pasiphae groups orbit at a greater percentage of their primary's Hill radius.

S/2021 N 1 is part of the Neso group, a cluster of distant retrograde irregular moons of Neptune that includes Psamathe and the group's namesake Neso. The moons of the Neso group have orbital elements that are clustered with semi-major axes between 46–51 million km (29–32 million mi), eccentricities between 0.4 and 0.5, and inclinations between 125° and 140°. Like all other irregular moon groups, the Neso group is thought to have formed from the destruction of a larger captured moon of Neptune due to asteroid and comet impacts, which left many fragments in similar orbits around Neptune.

S/2021 N 1's orbit exhibits nodal precession with an average period of about 900 Earth years, but it does not exhibit apsidal precession. Instead, the argument of pericenter of S/2021 N 1's orbit periodically librates around 90°, which is a behavior shared by Neso and Sao. This behavior is due to the Kozai–Lidov resonance, where perturbations by the Sun and Neptune are periodic. The Kozai–Lidov resonance causes periodic exchanges between eccentricity and inclination: for example, as S/2021 N 1's orbit becomes more eccentric, its orbit becomes less inclined and vice versa.

S/2021 N 1 last passed periapsis, or its nearest point to Neptune in its orbit, in September 2017 at a distance of approximately 27.1 million km (16.8 million mi; 0.181 AU). The moon is moving away from Neptune until it will reach apoapsis, its farthest point from the planet, in March 2032 at a distance of approximately 74.8 million km (46.5 million mi; 0.500 AU). S/2021 N 1 last passed apoapsis in November 2002 at a distance of approximately 76.6 million km (47.6 million mi; 0.512 AU)—the different distance from the next apoapsis is due to perturbations on the moon's orbit.

The orbit of S/2021 N 1 (red) and other Neptunian irregular moons (gray) as seen from three different views. S/2021 N 1's orbit does not form a closed ellipse, because it is highly perturbed.

== Physical characteristics ==
S/2021 N 1 is extremely faint with an average apparent magnitude of 27, which is near the detectability limits of some the largest telescopes on Earth like the Subaru Telescope. It is the faintest moon of Neptune discovered as of 2024. Nothing is known about S/2021 N 1's physical properties other than its absolute magnitude of 12.1, which can be used to estimate the moon's diameter. Assuming a geometric albedo range of 0.04–0.10 that is typical for most irregular moons, S/2021 N 1 has a diameter between 16–25 km (10–16 mi). Sheppard estimates the diameter to be 14 km, which if correct would make S/2021 N 1 the smallest known satellite orbiting Neptune.
