= Sphere of influence (astrodynamics) =

Region of space gravitationally dominated by a given body

A sphere of influence (SOI) in astrodynamics and astronomy is the oblate spheroid-shaped region where a particular celestial body exerts the main gravitational influence on an orbiting object. As such it is the dominating part of a gravitational field. It is usually used to describe the areas in the Solar System where planets dominate the orbits of surrounding objects such as moons, despite the presence of the much more massive but distant Sun.

In the patched conic approximation, used in estimating the trajectories of bodies moving between the neighbourhoods of different bodies using a two-body approximation, ellipses and hyperbolae, the SOI is taken as the boundary where the trajectory switches which mass field it is influenced by. It is not to be confused with the sphere of activity which extends well beyond the sphere of influence.

== Models ==
The most common base models to calculate the sphere of influence (sometimes also called gravisphere or gravity sphere) are the Hill sphere and the Laplace sphere, but updated and other models, as by Gleb Chebotaryov or particularly more dynamic ones, like the patched conic approximation, have been described. The general equation describing the radius of the sphere $r_\text{SOI}$ of a planet:

$$r_\text{SOI} \approx a\left(\frac{m}{M}\right)^{2/5}$$
where

- $a$ is the semimajor axis of the smaller object's (usually a planet's) orbit around the larger body (usually the Sun).
- $m$ and $M$ are the masses of the smaller and the larger object (usually a planet and the Sun), respectively.

In the patched conic approximation, once an object leaves the planet's SOI, the primary/only gravitational influence is the Sun (until the object enters another body's SOI). Because the definition of r_{SOI} relies on the presence of the Sun and a planet, the term is only applicable in a three-body or greater system and requires the mass of the primary body to be much greater than the mass of the secondary body. This changes the three-body problem into a restricted two-body problem.

== Table of selected SOI radii ==
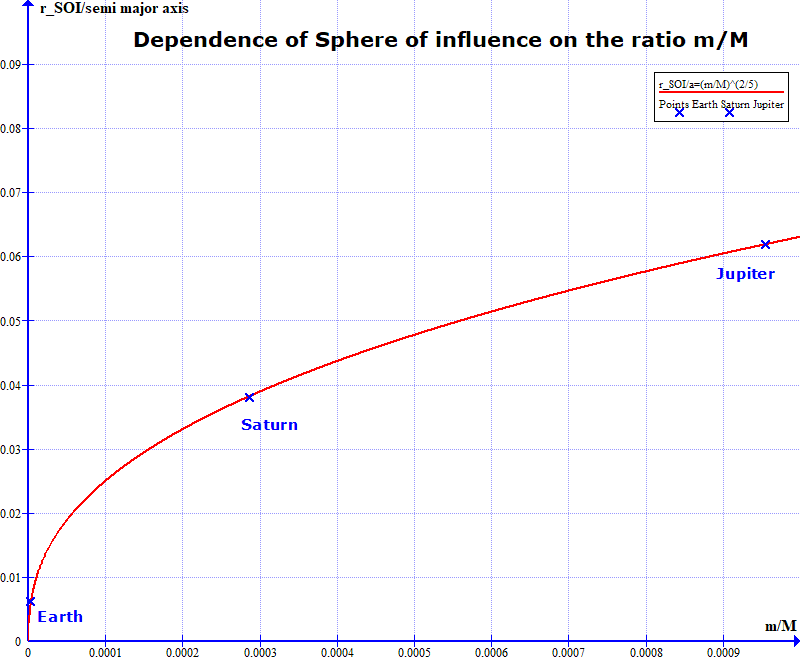
Dependence of Sphere of influence r_{SOI}/a on the ratio m/M

The table shows the values of the sphere of gravity of the bodies of the solar system in relation to the Sun (with the exception of the Moon which is reported relative to Earth):

Body	SOI			Body Diameter		Body Mass (10^{24} kg)	Distance from Sun		
Body	(10^{6} km)	(mi)	(radii)	(km)	(mi)	Body Mass (10^{24} kg)	(AU)	(10^{6} mi)	(10^{6} km)
Mercury	0.117	72,700	46	4,878	3,031	0.33	0.39	36	57.9
Venus	0.616	382,765	102	12,104	7,521	4.867	0.723	67.2	108.2
Earth + Moon	0.929	577,254	145	12,742 (Earth)	7,918 (Earth)	5.972 (Earth)	1	93	149.6
Moon	0.0643	39,993	37	3,476	2,160	0.07346	See Earth + Moon		
Mars	0.578	359,153	170	6,780	4,212	0.65	1.524	141.6	227.9
Jupiter	48.2	29,950,092	687	139,822	86,881	1900	5.203	483.6	778.3
Saturn	54.5	38,864,730	1025	116,464	72,367	570	9.539	886.7	1,427.0
Uranus	51.9	32,249,165	2040	50,724	31,518	87	19.18	1,784.0	2,871.0
Neptune	86.2	53,562,197	3525	49,248	30,601	100	30.06	2,794.4	4,497.1

An important understanding to be drawn from this table is that "Sphere of Influence" here is "Primary". For example, though Jupiter is much larger in mass than Neptune, its Primary SOI is much smaller due to Jupiter's closer proximity to the Sun.

== Increased accuracy on the SOI ==
The sphere of influence is, in fact, not quite a sphere. The distance to the SOI depends on the angular distance $\theta$ from the massive body. A more accurate formula is given by

$$r_\text{SOI}(\theta) \approx a\left(\frac{m}{M}\right)^{2/5}\frac{1}{\sqrt[10]{1+3\cos^2(\theta)}}$$

Averaging over all possible directions yields:

$$\overline{r_\text{SOI}} = 0.9431 a\left(\frac{m}{M}\right)^{2/5}$$

== Derivation ==
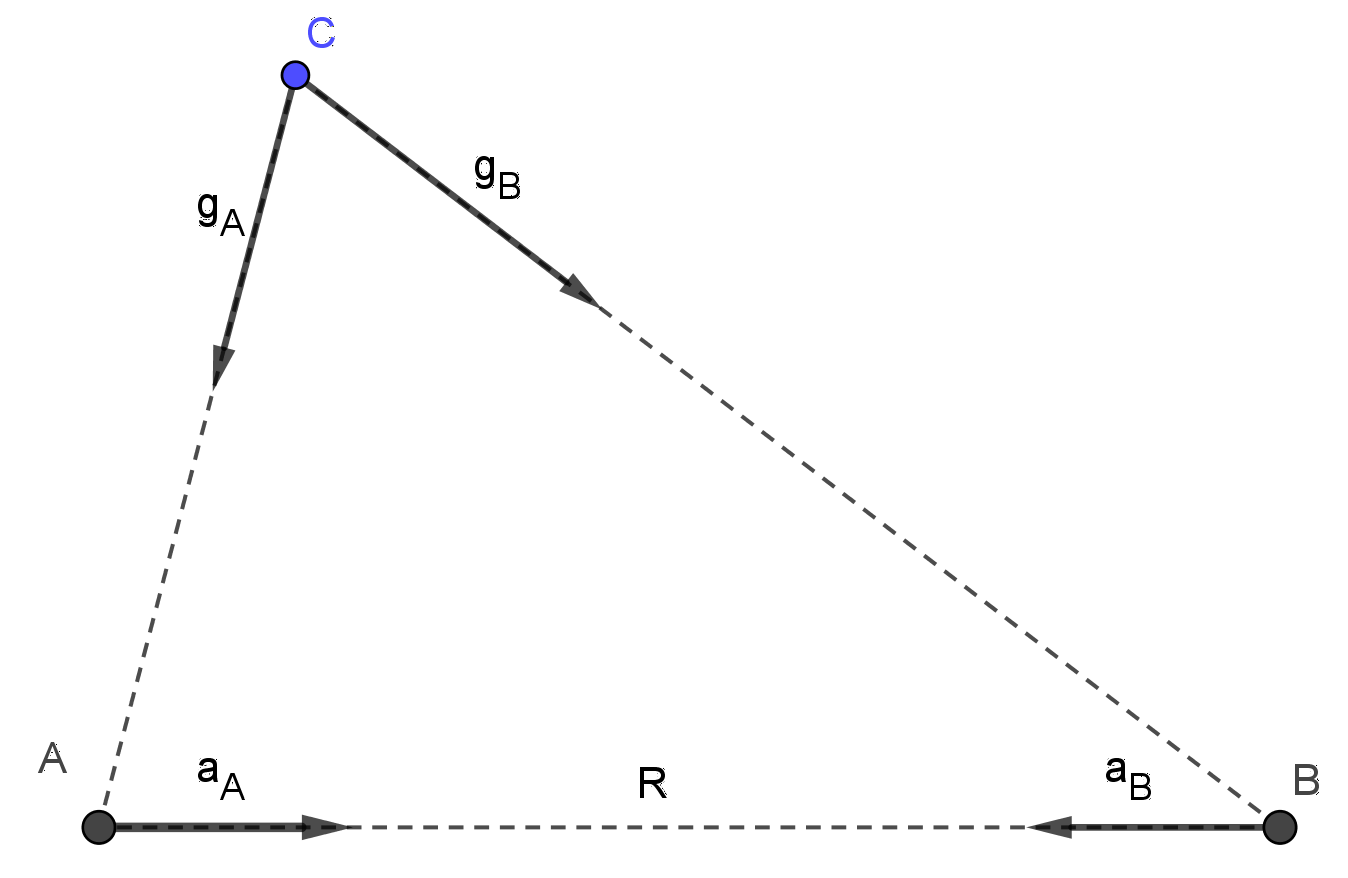
Geometry and dynamics to derive the sphere of influence

Consider two point masses $A$ and $B$ at locations $r_A$ and $r_B$, with mass $m_A$ and $m_B$ respectively. The distance $R=|r_B-r_A|$ separates the two objects. Given a massless third point $C$ at location $r_C$, one can ask whether to use a frame centered on $A$ or on $B$ to analyse the dynamics of $C$.

Consider a frame centered on $A$. The gravity of $B$ is denoted as $g_B$ and will be treated as a perturbation to the dynamics of $C$ due to the gravity $g_A$ of body $A$. Due to their gravitational interactions, point $A$ is attracted to point $B$ with acceleration $a_A = \frac{Gm_B}{R^3} (r_B-r_A)$, this frame is therefore non-inertial. To quantify the effects of the perturbations in this frame, one should consider the ratio of the perturbations to the main body gravity i.e. $\chi_A = \frac{|g_B-a_A|}{|g_A|}$. The perturbation $g_B-a_A$ is also known as the tidal forces due to body $B$. It is possible to construct the perturbation ratio $\chi_B$ for the frame centered on $B$ by interchanging $A \leftrightarrow B$.

	Frame A	Frame B
Main acceleration	$g_A$	$g_B$
Frame acceleration	$a_A$	$a_B$
Secondary acceleration	$g_B$	$g_A$
Perturbation, tidal forces	$g_B-a_A$	$g_A-a_B$
Perturbation ratio $\chi$	$\chi_A = \frac{|g_B-a_A|}{|g_A|}$	$\chi_B = \frac{|g_A-a_B|}{|g_B|}$

As $C$ gets close to $A$, $\chi_A \rightarrow 0$ and $\chi_B \rightarrow \infty$, and vice versa. The frame to choose is the one that has the smallest perturbation ratio. The surface for which $\chi_A = \chi_B$ separates the two regions of influence. In general this region is rather complicated but in the case that one mass dominates the other, say $m_A \ll m_B$, it is possible to approximate the separating surface. In such a case this surface must be close to the mass $A$, denote $r$ as the distance from $A$ to the separating surface.

	Frame A	Frame B
Main acceleration	$g_A = \frac{G m_A}{r^2}$	$g_B \approx \frac{G m_B}{R^2} + \frac{G m_B}{R^3} r \approx \frac{G m_B}{R^2}$
Frame acceleration	$a_A = \frac{G m_B}{R^2}$	$a_B = \frac{G m_A}{R^2} \approx 0$
Secondary acceleration	$g_B \approx \frac{G m_B}{R^2} + \frac{G m_B}{R^3} r$	$g_A = \frac{G m_A}{r^2}$
Perturbation, tidal forces	$g_B-a_A \approx \frac{G m_B}{R^3} r$	$g_A-a_B \approx \frac{G m_A}{r^2}$
Perturbation ratio $\chi$	$\chi_A \approx \frac{m_B}{m_A} \frac{r^3}{R^3}$	$\chi_B \approx \frac{m_A}{m_B} \frac{R^2}{r^2}$

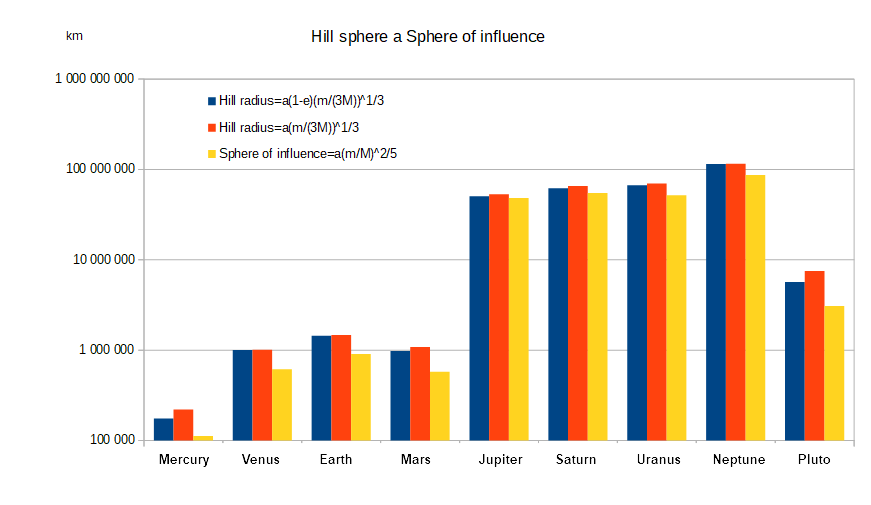
Hill sphere and Sphere Of Influence for Solar System bodies

The distance to the sphere of influence must thus satisfy $\frac{m_B}{m_A} \frac{r^3}{R^3} = \frac{m_A}{m_B} \frac{R^2}{r^2}$ and so $r = R\left(\frac{m_A}{m_B}\right)^{2/5}$ is the radius of the sphere of influence of body $A$

== Gravity well ==
Simulation of a planet orbiting a star alongwith their respective gravity wells

A gravity well (or funnel) is a metaphorical concept for a gravitational field of a mass, with the field being curved in a funnel-shaped well around the mass, illustrating the steep gravitational potential and its energy that needs to be accounted for in order to escape or enter the main part of a sphere of influence.

An example for this is the strong gravitational field of the Sun and Mercury being deep within it. At perihelion Mercury goes even deeper into the Sun's gravity well, causing an anomalistic or perihelion apsidal precession which is more recognizable than with other planets due to Mercury being deep in the gravity well. This characteristic of Mercury's orbit was famously calculated by Albert Einstein through his formulation of gravity with the speed of light, and the corresponding general relativity theory, eventually being one of the first cases proving the theory.

Gravity well illustrated with the effective radial potentials of schwarzschild geodesics for various angular momenta. Each point on the curves represent a radius or circular orbit and the curve represents their stability depending on the energy of their particle, with orbits therefore normally not remaining circular and migrating along the curve. At small radii, the energy drops precipitously, causing the particle to be pulled inexorably inwards to $r = 0$. However, when the normalized angular momentum $\frac{a}{r_\text{s}} = \frac{L}{mcr_\text{s}}$ equals the square root of three, a metastable circular orbit is possible at the radius highlighted with a green circle. At higher angular momenta, there is a significant centrifugal barrier (orange curve) or energy hill and an unstable inner radius, highlighted in red.

== See also ==
- Clearing the neighbourhood
- Hill sphere
- Sphere of influence (black hole)

== General references ==
- Bate, Roger R.; Mueller, Donald D.; White, Jerry E. (1971). Fundamentals of astrodynamics. Dover books on astronomy. New York: Dover Publications. pp. 333–334. ISBN 978-0-486-60061-1.
- Sellers, Jerry Jon; Astore, William J.; Giffen, Robert B.; Larson, Wiley J. (2015). Marilyn (ed.). Understanding space: an introduction to astronautics (4nd ed.). New York: McGraw-Hill Companies. pp. 228, 738. ISBN 978-0-9904299-4-4.
- Danby, J. M. A. (1992). Fundamentals of celestial mechanics (2nd ed.). Richmond, Va., U.S.A: Willmann-Bell. pp. 352–353. ISBN 978-0-943396-20-0.
