= S/2018 J 4 =

Outer moon of Jupiter

- Discovery images of S/2018 J 4 from the Cerro Tololo Observatory's Dark Energy Camera on 11 May 2018

Discovery
- Discovered by: Scott S. Sheppard
- Discovery site: Cerro Tololo Obs.
- Discovery date: 11 May 2018

Designations
- Alternative names: S/2018 J 4

Orbital characteristics
- Epoch 1 January 2000 (JD 2451545.0)
- Observation arc: 6 years 2024-12-03 (last obs)
- Earliest precovery date: 2018-05-11
- Satellite of: Jupiter
- Group: Carpo

Proper orbital elements
- Proper semi-major axis: 16,328,500 km (0.109149 AU)
- Proper eccentricity: 0.177
- Proper inclination: 50.2° (to ecliptic)
- Proper orbital period: 1.17 years (426.26 d)
- Precession of perihelion long.: N/A arcsec / yr
- Precession of asc. node: 6638.868 arcsec / yr

Physical characteristics
- Mean diameter: ≈2 km
- Albedo: 0.04 (assumed)
- Apparent magnitude: 23.5
- Absolute magnitude (H): 16.75 (28 obs)

S/2018 J 4 is a small outer natural satellite of Jupiter discovered by Scott S. Sheppard on 11 May 2018, using the 4.0-meter Víctor M. Blanco Telescope at Cerro Tololo Observatory, Chile. It was announced by the Minor Planet Center on 20 January 2023, after observations were collected over a long enough time span to confirm the satellite's orbit. The satellite has a diameter of about 2 km (1.2 mi) for an absolute magnitude of 16.7.

S/2018 J 4 is an irregular moon of Jupiter on a highly inclined prograde orbit at an angle of 53° with respect to the ecliptic plane. It belongs to the same group as the similarly inclined moon Carpo, which was long thought to be an outlier until the discovery of S/2018 J 4. Like all irregular moons of Jupiter, S/2018 J 4's orbit is highly variable over time due to gravitational perturbations by the Sun and other planets. On average, S/2018 J 4's orbit has a semi-major axis of 16.3 million km (10.1 million mi), an eccentricity of 0.18, and a very high inclination of 50° with respect to the ecliptic.

Like Carpo, S/2018 J 4's very high inclination subjects it to the Lidov–Kozai resonance, where there is a periodic exchange between its orbital eccentricity and inclination while its argument of pericenter oscillates about a constant value without apsidally precessing. For example, the Lidov–Kozai resonance causes Carpo's eccentricity and inclination to fluctuate between 0.19–0.69 and 44–59°, respectively. S/2018 J 4's argument of pericenter oscillates about 270° with respect to the ecliptic.
