= Psamathe (moon) =

Irregular moon of Neptune

- Psamathe imaged by the Very Large Telescope on 13 July 2010

Discovery (Note: This is the exact order of discoverers listed by NASA, the International Astronomical Union, and the United States Geological Survey.)
- Discovered by: Scott S. Sheppard; David C. Jewitt; Jan T. Kleyna
- Discovery site: Mauna Kea Obs.
- Discovery date: 29 August 2003

Designations
- Designation: Neptune X
- Pronunciation: /ˈsæməθiː/
- Named after: Ψαμάθη (Psamathè)
- Alternative names: S/2003 N 1
- Adjectives: Psamathean /sæməˈθiːən/

Orbital characteristics (range) (Note: Sheppard et al. (2024) give the mean, minimum, and maximum values for Neso's osculating orbital elements in Table 6: semi-major axis 47646600+2522400 −1983400 km, eccentricity 0.41+0.47 −0.34, inclination 128°+20° −11° with respect to the ecliptic, and orbital period 9149+735 −566. The error bars represent the difference between the minimum/maximum value and the average value over a 10,000-year period.)
- Observation arc: 20.97 years (7,660 d)
- Earliest precovery date: 11 August 2001
- Semi-major axis: 45,663,200 to 50,169,000 km (0.305240 to 0.335359 AU)
- Eccentricity: 0.07 to 0.88
- Orbital period (sidereal): 23.50 to 27.06 years (8,583 to 9,884 d)
- Inclination: 117° to 148° (to ecliptic)
- Satellite of: Neptune
- Group: Neso group

Proper orbital elements (average) (Note: The proper orbital elements of Neso listed in the infobox are average (mean) values over a 10,000-year period, as shown in Table 6 of Sheppard et al. (2024) and Jet Propulsion Laboratory's Planetary Satellite Mean Elements table.)
- Proper semi-major axis: 47,646,600 km (0.318498 AU)
- Proper eccentricity: 0.413
- Proper inclination: 127.8° (to ecliptic)
- Proper orbital period: 25.05 years (9,149 d)
- Precession of perihelion long.: 873.31536 arcsec / yr
- Precession of asc. node: 972.24306 arcsec / yr

Physical characteristics
- Mean diameter: 36 to 40 km (Note: The 36 km diameter estimate comes from Holman et al. (2004) who assume a geometric albedo of 0.06, while the 40 km diameter estimate comes from Sheppard et al. (2006) who assume a geometric albedo of 0.04.)
- Apparent magnitude: 25.1 to 25.5 (R-band)
- Absolute magnitude (H): 10.80

Psamathe (/ˈsæməθiː/), also known as Neptune X and previously as S/2003 N 1, is an irregular moon of Neptune. It was discovered by Scott Sheppard, David Jewitt, and Jan Kleyna at Mauna Kea Observatory on 29 August 2003. Named after one of the Nereids from Greek mythology, Psamathe follows a distant, highly eccentric, and highly inclined orbit with an average orbital period of about 25 Earth years. Like the majority of irregular moons, Psamathe's orbit is retrograde, meaning it revolves around Neptune in the opposite direction to the planet's orbit around the Sun.

Psamathe is estimated to have a diameter between 36 and 40 km (22 and 25 mi), though most of its physical properties are unknown. Psamathe shares similar orbital characteristics with Neptune's two outermost moons, Neso and S/2021 N 1, which suggests they originated from the collisional breakup of a once-larger moon of Neptune billions of years ago.

== Discovery ==
Psamathe was discovered by astronomers Scott Sheppard, David Jewitt, and Jan Kleyna on 29 August 2003. At the time, the team was searching for distant moons of Neptune, using the 8.2-meter (27 ft) Subaru Telescope at Mauna Kea Observatory, Hawaii. Their search strategy involved using the telescope's camera to photograph patches of the sky around Neptune at roughly 33-minute intervals, which revealed the planet's moons as faint, slowly-moving points of light. The team detected Psamathe in images taken on 29 and 30 August 2003, and reported their discovery to the Minor Planet Center (MPC) on 1 September.

Sometime later on 1 September 2003, Matthew Holman reported the identification of a candidate moon of Neptune in observations from 19 August 2003 and 11 August 2001. These observations came from an earlier search for Neptunian moons, which was led by Holman at Cerro Tololo Inter-American Observatory, Chile. Brian G. Marsden of the MPC recognized that Holman's moon candidate might turn out to be Psamathe, which became confirmed after Holman uncovered more observations from August 2002 and July 2003. With over two years of recorded observations, the MPC announced the discovery of Psamathe on 3 September 2003.

== Name ==
When the discovery of Psamathe was announced, it was given the temporary provisional designation "S/2003 N 1" by the Minor Planet Center. Sheppard's team named the moon "Psamathe" in a 2006 paper describing its discovery, although the name did not receive official approval by the International Astronomical Union (IAU) until 3 February 2007. The moon was named after Psamathe (Ψαμάθη), one of the fifty Nereids or daughters of Nereus and Doris from Greek mythology. The moon was given a name ending with "e" to indicate its retrograde orbit, in a similar fashion to the naming convention for Jupiter's irregular moons. When the name was approved, the IAU gave Psamathe its Roman numeral designation "Neptune X".

== Orbit ==
Psamathe is an irregular moon of Neptune, meaning it follows a distant, highly eccentric, and highly inclined orbit around the planet. (Note: Neptune's moons Triton and Nereid are sometimes considered irregular moons, though researchers often discuss them separately due to their unusual orbital characteristics and disproportionately large sizes.) Like the majority of irregular moons, Psamathe's orbit is retrograde, meaning it revolves around Neptune in the opposite direction to the planet's orbit around the Sun. Due to its great distance from Neptune, the moon is strongly affected by the Sun's gravity, which causes substantial long-term variations in its orbit. For this reason, Psamathe's orbit is better described by proper orbital elements, which are calculated by averaging out its perturbed orbit over an extended period of time.

Over a 10,000-year time span, Psamathe's semi-major axis from Neptune varies from 45.7 to 50.2 million km (28.4 to 31.2 million mi; 0.305 to 0.336 AU), averaging about 47.6 million km (29.6 million mi; 0.318 AU). In terms of average semi-major axis, Psamathe is the third-outermost known moon of Neptune, behind Neso and S/2021 N 1. At its average distance, Psamathe occupies 41% of Neptune's Hill radius, (Note: Neptune has a Hill radius of 0.7771 AU (116.25 million km; 72.24 million mi). Dividing Psamathe's average semi-major axis by Neptune's Hill radius gives approximately 41%, in agreement with the Hill radius plot shown in Figure 1 of Sheppard et al. (2024).) placing it just over halfway to the outer limit at which retrograde moons can stably orbit the planet. (Note: For retrograde moons, the theoretical maximum orbital distance is 70% of the planet's Hill radius.)

On average, Psamathe takes about 25.05 years (9,149 days) to complete one orbit around Neptune, though perturbations by the Sun can vary the orbital period from 23.50 to 27.06 years (8,583 to 9,884 days). While Psamathe's orbit has an average eccentricity of 0.41 and an average inclination of 128° with respect to the ecliptic, both values vary substantially due to the Sun's perturbations. The moon's eccentricity ranges from 0.07 to 0.88, while its inclination ranges from 117° to 148°.

Approximate dates and distances of Psamathe's periapsis and apoapsis
Periapsis		Apoapsis	
Date (Note: Only the approximate date for periapsis/apoapsis is given, since Psamathe's radial velocity with respect to Neptune may hit zero more than once during the moment of periapsis/apoapsis, as seen in JPL Horizons's radial velocity table for Psamathe's 1988 periapsis. Additionally, the periapsis/apoapsis dates may slightly change with updates to calculations of Psamathe's orbit.) (UTC)	Distance	Date (UTC)	Distance
May 1988	30.789 million km (0.20581 AU)	Sep 1999	63.015 million km (0.42123 AU)
Feb 2014	36.138 million km (0.24157 AU)	Jul 2026	57.254 million km (0.38272 AU)
Nov 2039	36.972 million km (0.24714 AU)	Dec 2051	57.202 million km (0.38237 AU)

Since Psamathe follows an eccentric orbit, its distance from Neptune varies by several tens of millions of km as it moves from periapsis to apoapsis in its orbit. However, because of its variable semi-major axis and eccentricity, its periapsis and apoapsis distances can change. (Note: Periapsis (q) and apoapsis (Q) distances are calculated from semi-major axis (a) and eccentricity (e) according to the equations $q {{=}} a(1-e)$ and $Q {{=}} a(1+e)$.) For example, in May 1988, Psamathe passed periapsis at a distance of 30.8 million km (19.1 million mi; 0.206 AU), whereas in October 2014, Psamathe passed periapsis at a farther distance of 36.1 million km (22.4 million mi; 0.241 AU). Likewise, Psamathe passed apoapsis in September 1999 at a distance of 63.0 million km (39.1 million mi; 0.421 AU), whereas Psamathe passed apoapsis at a closer distance of 57.3 million km (35.6 million mi; 0.383 AU).

Psamathe is not in an orbital resonance, unlike its neighbors Neso and S/2021 N 1. Over a period of 4.5 billion years, Psamathe has 1.3% chance of colliding with Nereid, one of Neptune's largest irregular moons. Its orbit exhibits both apsidal and nodal precession with periods of 1,484 and 1,333 years, respectively. Psamathe has a longer apsidal precession period than its nodal precession period, which causes its longitude of pericenter (ϖ) to precess in the opposite direction from its orbital motion. This behavior makes Psamathe a "reverse circulator".

The orbit of Psamathe (red) and other irregular moons of Neptune (gray), as seen from three different views. These moons orbit far beyond Triton and Nereid, Neptune's largest moons (colored magenta). Psamathe's orbit does not form a closed ellipse because it is highly perturbed.

=== Group and origin ===
Psamathe shares similar orbital characteristics with two other Neptunian irregular moons, Neso and S/2021 N 1. Together, they form the Neso group, a family of retrograde irregular moons of which Neso is the largest member. Psamathe was first suspected to be related to Neso in 2004. but it was not confirmed until the discovery of S/2021 N 1 as a third member in 2024. (Note: S/2021 N 1 was discovered in 2021, but its orbit was not determined and published until 2024.) The group is predicted to contain many more smaller members, though they are too faint to be detected with current technology.

Because of their similar orbits, the moons of the Neso group have low mutual dispersion velocities of around 100 m/s. The dispersion velocity is the speed needed to eject a fragment from a parent body onto its current orbit. For fragments produced in collisions, their dispersion velocities are typically below 100 m/s, comparable to the parent body's escape velocity. This suggests that the Neso group is a collisional family, formed by the destruction of a once-larger parent body by a collision with an asteroid or comet billions of years ago. The parent body was probably an irregular moon that was gravitationally captured by Neptune during the Solar System's early history, during or shortly after the formation of the planets.

If the Neso group is a collisional family, then its members are expected to share similar surface characteristics, such as color. However, this remains yet to be verified, as Neso is the only member with a known surface color as of 2022.

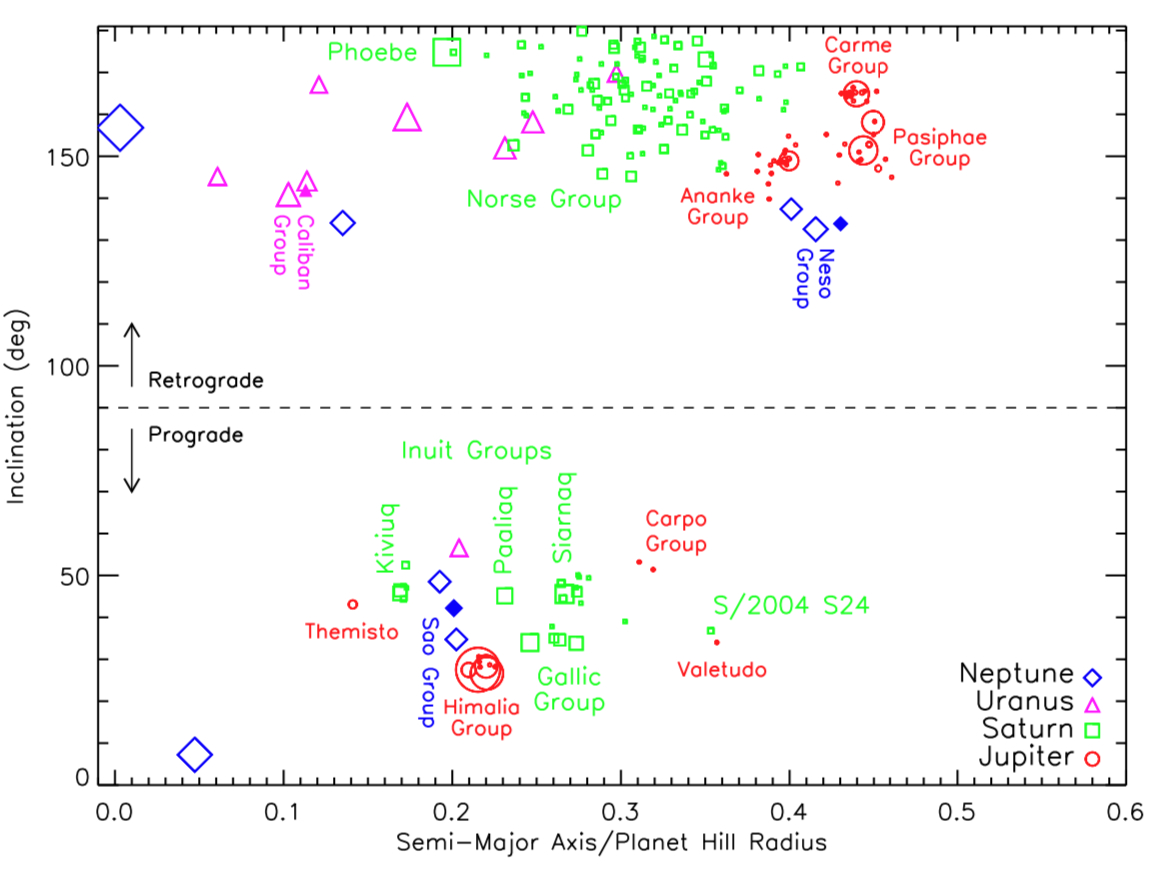
Irregular moons of all four giant planets, plotted by average distance from their planet (semi-major axis in Hill radii) and orbital inclination (degrees with respect to ecliptic). The Neso group is the cluster of retrograde moons labeled in blue.

Evolution of Psamathe's orbital eccentricity (blue), inclination (orange), argument of pericenter (green), and periapsis distance from Neptune (red) from 1600 to 2400

Sped-up simulation of Psamathe's orbit around Neptune, from 1600 to 2400. Due to perturbations by the Sun, the orbit precesses and changes shape.

== Physical characteristics ==
Little is known about Psamathe's physical characteristics. In red light (R band), Psamathe has an apparent magnitude of about 25, making it extremely dim. Because of this, Psamathe and most of Neptune's irregular moons can only be observed through long-exposure imaging with large optical telescopes.

The diameter of Psamathe has not been directly measured, although it can be indirectly estimated from its brightness and an assumed geometric albedo. Assuming a geometric albedo of 0.04, Psamathe's diameter would be about 40 km (25 mi). For a higher albedo of 0.06, Psamathe would have a diameter of 36 km (22 mi). The color of Psamathe is unknown. If it shares a common origin with Neso, then both moons are expected to share similar colors.

== See also ==
Other Solar System moons discovered by Sheppard and Jewitt with the Subaru Telescope in 2003:

- Narvi – moon of Saturn
- Margaret – moon of Uranus (discovered on the same date as Psamathe)
