= Neso (moon) =

Irregular moon of Neptune

- Neso imaged by the Very Large Telescope on 3 September 2002

Discovery (Note: This is the exact order of discoverers listed by NASA, the International Astronomical Union, and the United States Geological Survey.)
- Discovered by: Matthew J. Holman; JJ Kavelaars; Tommy Grav; Wesley C. Fraser; Dan Milisavljevic
- Discovery site: Cerro Tololo Obs.
- Discovery date: 14 August 2002

Designations
- Designation: Neptune XIII
- Pronunciation: /ˈniːsoʊ/
- Named after: Νησώ (Nèsô)
- Alternative names: S/2002 N 4

Orbital characteristics (range) (Note: Sheppard et al. (2024) give the mean, minimum, and maximum values for Neso's osculating orbital elements in Table 6: semi-major axis 49,897,800+2,912,900 −2,242,500 km, eccentricity 0.46+0.42 −0.32, inclination 128°+17° −11° with respect to the ecliptic, and orbital period 9,805+870 −655. The error bars represent the difference between the minimum/maximum value and the average value over a 10,000-year period.)
- Observation arc: 19.96 years (7,292 d)
- Semi-major axis: 47,655,300 to 52,810,700 km (0.318556 to 0.353018 AU)
- Eccentricity: 0.14 to 0.88
- Orbital period (sidereal): 25.05 to 29.23 years (9,150 to 10,675 d)
- Inclination: 117° to 145° (to ecliptic)
- Satellite of: Neptune
- Group: Neso group

Proper orbital elements (average) (Note: The proper orbital elements of Neso listed in the infobox are average (mean) values over a 10,000-year period, as shown in Table 6 of Sheppard et al. (2024) and Jet Propulsion Laboratory's Planetary Satellite Mean Elements table.)
- Proper semi-major axis: 49,897,800 km (0.333546 AU)
- Proper eccentricity: 0.455
- Proper inclination: 128.4° (to ecliptic)
- Proper orbital period: 26.84 years (9,805 d)
- Precession of asc. node: 1161.29032258 arcsec / yr

Physical characteristics
- Mean diameter: 43 to 60 km (Note: The 43-kilometer-diameter estimate comes from Holman et al. (2004) who assume a geometric albedo of 0.06, while the 60-kilometer-diameter estimate comes from Sheppard et al. (2006) who assume a geometric albedo of 0.04.)
- Spectral type: V–R = 0.58±0.13; V–I = 1.0±0.4; R–I = 0.7±0.4
- Apparent magnitude: 25.6±0.3 (V-band); 25.2±0.2 (R-band)
- Absolute magnitude (H): 10.67; 10.25±0.10 (R-band)

Neso (/ˈniːsoʊ/), also known as Neptune XIII and previously as S/2002 N 4, is the second-outermost-known moon of Neptune, behind S/2021 N 1. It was discovered on 14 August 2002 by Matthew Holman, JJ Kavelaars, Tommy Grav, Wesley Fraser, and Dan Milisavljevic at Cerro Tololo Inter-American Observatory, Chile. Named after one of the Nereids from Greek mythology, Neso orbits Neptune at an average distance of 49.9 million km (31.0 million mi)—almost as far as Mercury's orbital distance from the Sun—and takes about 26.8 Earth years to complete one orbit. It is classified as an irregular moon because it follows a distant, highly eccentric, and highly inclined orbit.

Due to Neso's great distance from Neptune, its orbit is significantly influenced by the Sun's gravity. As a result, the moon experiences the Kozai resonance, which causes large, synchronized variations in its orbital eccentricity and inclination over a 600-year period. Neso shares similar orbital characteristics with two other Neptunian irregular moons, Psamathe and S/2021 N 1, which suggests they originated from the collisional breakup of a once-larger moon of Neptune billions of years ago. Most of Neso's physical properties are unknown, though telescope observations suggest it has a reddish color and a diameter between 43 and 60 km (27 and 37 mi).

== Discovery ==
Neso was discovered by astronomers Matthew Holman, JJ Kavelaars, Tommy Grav, Wesley Fraser, and Dan Milisavljevic during a search for distant moons of Neptune. Led by Holman, the search began in 2001 and employed large optical telescopes on Earth to obtain numerous long-exposure images of the sky around Neptune. The team used the shift-and-add technique to align and combine the images according to Neptune's motion across the sky, which enhanced the faint moons as points of light. Through this technique, they discovered Neso alongside two other Neptunian moons—Halimede and Sao—in images taken on 14 August 2002 by the 4-meter Víctor M. Blanco Telescope at Cerro Tololo Inter-American Observatory, Chile.

To determine Neso's orbit around Neptune, astronomers conducted follow-up observations at several observatories. A team led by Brett Gladman observed Neso on 3 September 2002 with the 8.2 m Very Large Telescope at Cerro Paranal Observatory, while Holman's team observed it later that day with the 2.5 m Nordic Optical Telescope at La Palma Observatory. Neso was next recovered by Holman on 19 August 2003 with the 4 m Blanco Telescope, followed by additional observations with Las Campanas Observatory's 6.5 m Magellan Clay Telescope from 28 to 30 September. After more than a year of observations, the Minor Planet Center announced Neso's discovery on 30 September 2003. It was the fifth and last moon of Neptune announced in 2003, (Note: Halimede, Sao, and Laomedeia were announced in January 2003, while Psamathe was announced in early September 2003.) bringing the planet's count of known moons to 13.

== Name ==
When the discovery of Neso was announced, it was given the temporary provisional designation "S/2002 N 4" by the Minor Planet Center. It was later named and given the Roman numeral designation Neptune XIII by the International Astronomical Union's (IAU's) Working Group for Planetary System Nomenclature on 3 February 2007. In accordance with the IAU's naming convention for Neptunian irregular moons, it was named after Neso (Νησώ), one of the fifty Nereids or daughters of Nereus and Doris from Greek mythology. (Note: According to Nicholson et al. (2008), Neptunian irregular moons with prograde and retrograde orbits are generally given names ending with "a" or "e", respectively, while those with unusually high orbital inclinations are given names ending with "o". However, the International Astronomical Union does not state this naming scheme on its website, nor does Neso have the highest or lowest average orbital inclination among Neptune's irregular moons. The only two Neptunian irregular moons with names ending with "o", Neso and Sao, are both in Kozai resonance unlike the rest of the named Neptunian irregular moons.)

== Orbit ==
Neso is an irregular moon of Neptune, meaning it follows a distant, highly eccentric, and highly inclined orbit around the planet. (Note: Neptune's moons Triton and Nereid are sometimes considered irregular moons, though researchers often discuss them separately due to their unusual orbital characteristics and disproportionately large sizes.) Like the majority of irregular moons, Neso's orbit is retrograde, meaning it revolves around Neptune in the opposite direction to the planet's orbit around the Sun. Due to its great distance from Neptune, the moon is strongly affected by the Sun's gravity, which causes substantial long-term variations in its orbit. For this reason, Neso's orbit is better described by proper orbital elements, which are calculated by averaging out its perturbed orbit over an extended period of time.

Over a 10,000-year time span, Neso's semi-major axis from Neptune varies from 47.7 to 52.8 million km (29.6 to 32.8 million mi; 0.319 to 0.353 AU), averaging about 49.9 million km (31.0 million mi; 0.334 AU). At such distances, Neptune would appear as a tiny, barely-visible disc from Neso with an average angular diameter of roughly 3 arcminutes. (Note: The angular diameter θ of a planet with diameter D as seen from a distance a is calculated with the formula $\theta {{=}} \arctan \frac{D}{a}$. To find Neptune's angular diameter as seen from Neso's average semi-major axis, plug in Neptune's diameter D = 49,244 km (twice its mean radius of 24,622 km) and Neso's average semi-major axis a = 49.9×10^{6} km. This gives an angular diameter of 0.0565° (or 3.39 arcminutes) for Neptune.) The scale of Neso's orbit is comparable to that of Mercury, which orbits the Sun at a semi-major axis of 57.9 million km (36.0 million mi; 0.387 AU). In terms of average semi-major axis, Neso is the second-outermost known moon of Neptune, behind S/2021 N 1. At its average distance, Neso occupies 43% of Neptune's Hill radius, (Note: Neptune has a Hill radius of 0.7771 AU (116.25 million km; 72.24 million mi). Dividing Neso's average semi-major axis by Neptune's Hill radius gives approximately 43%, in agreement with the Hill radius plot shown in Figure 1 of Sheppard et al. (2024).) placing it just over halfway to the outer limit at which retrograde moons can stably orbit the planet. (Note: For retrograde moons, the theoretical maximum orbital distance is 70% of the planet's Hill radius.)

Approximate dates and distances of Neso's periapsis and apoapsis
Periapsis		Apoapsis	
Date (Note: Only the approximate date for periapsis/apoapsis is given, since Neso's radial velocity with respect to Neptune may hit zero more than once during the moment of periapsis/apoapsis, as seen in JPL Horizons's radial velocity table for Neso's 1996 apoapsis. Additionally, the periapsis/apoapsis dates may slightly change with updates to calculations of Neso's orbit.) (UTC)	Distance	Date (UTC)	Distance
May 1983	13.139 million km (0.08783 AU)	March 1996	83.649 million km (0.55916 AU)
October 2010	17.807 million km (0.11903 AU)	July 2025	85.603 million km (0.57222 AU)
January 2038	10.621 million km (0.07100 AU)	July 2050	88.991 million km (0.59487 AU)

On average, Neso takes about 26.84 years (9,805 days) to complete one orbit around Neptune, though perturbations by the Sun can vary the orbital period from 25.05 to 29.23 years (9,150 to 10,675 days). Due to its long orbital period, it is unlikely to collide with other irregular moons. While Neso's orbit has an average eccentricity of 0.46 and an average inclination of 128° with respect to the ecliptic, both values vary substantially due to the Sun's perturbations. The moon's eccentricity ranges from 0.14 to 0.88, while its inclination ranges from 117° to 145°.

Since Neso follows an eccentric orbit, its distance from Neptune varies by several tens of millions of km as it moves from periapsis to apoapsis in its orbit. However, because of its variable semi-major axis and eccentricity, its periapsis and apoapsis distances can change. (Note: Periapsis (q) and apoapsis (Q) distances are calculated from semi-major axis (a) and eccentricity (e) according to the equations $q {{=}} a(1-e)$ and $Q {{=}} a(1+e)$.) For example, in October 2010, Neso passed periapsis at a distance of 17.8 million km (11.1 million mi; 0.119 AU), whereas in January 2038, Neso will pass periapsis at a closer distance of 10.6 million km (6.6 million mi; 0.071 AU). Likewise, in July 2025, Neso passed apoapsis at a distance 85.6 million km (53.2 million mi; 0.572 AU), whereas in July 2050, Neso will pass apoapsis at a further distance of 89.0 million km (55.3 million mi; 0.595 AU).

The orbit of Neso (red) and other irregular moons of Neptune (gray), as seen from three different views. These moons orbit far beyond Triton and Nereid, Neptune's largest moons (colored magenta). Neso's orbit does not form a closed ellipse because it is highly perturbed.

=== Kozai resonance ===
Neso's high inclination places it in the Kozai resonance, a dynamical phenomenon in which perturbations from the Sun cause periodic exchanges between orbital eccentricity and inclination. First recognized by Matija Ćuk and Joseph A. Burns in 2004, the Kozai resonance causes Neso's eccentricity and inclination to oscillate in phase over a period of about 600 years, (Note: Although Brozović and Jacobson (2022) do not explicitly give the oscillation period for Neso's eccentricity and inclination, they do mention that they are correlated with the moon's argument of pericenter libration, which has a period of ~600 years. This can be seen in Figure 5 of their paper.) with eccentricity reaching maximum at maximum inclination and vice versa. Because Neso's orbit is retrograde (its inclination exceeds 90°), maximum inclination corresponds to the smallest displacement from the ecliptic rather than the greatest. If Neso had an inclination below 120° and a semi-major axis greater than 60% of Neptune's Hill radius (0.466 AU or 69.7 million km or 43.3 million mi), the Kozai resonance would destabilize its orbit. While Neso's orbit exhibits nodal precession with a period of 1,116 years, the Kozai resonance prevents it from apsidally precessing. Instead of circulating from 0° to 360°, Neso's argument of pericenter librates around 90° with a period of about 600 years. This means the moon always comes to periapsis above the ecliptic. (Note: Figures 10 and 11 of Sheppard et al. (2024) demonstrate that the vertical position of a moon's periapsis (e sin(ω), the vertical component of the eccentricity vector pointing from apoapsis to periapsis) is always positive (above the ecliptic) when its argument of pericenter (ω) librates around 90°. For an explanation of e sin(ω), see Brozović and Jacobson (2022).)

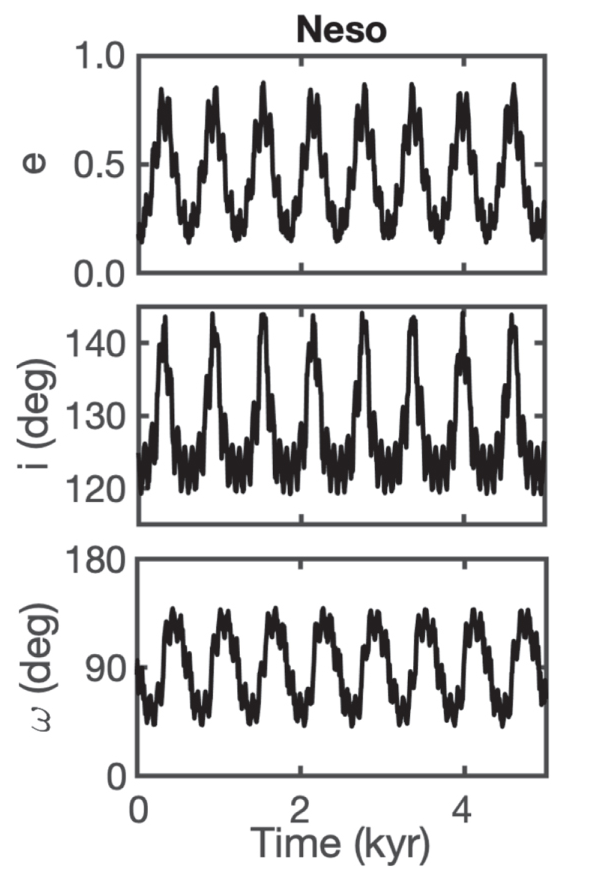
Plots showing periodic oscillations in Neso's eccentricity (e), inclination (i), and argument of pericenter (ω) over 5,000 years

Sped-up simulation of Neso's orbit around Neptune, viewed at an oblique angle. While Neso's orbit nodally precesses, it also changes shape due to the Kozai resonance.

Sped-up simulation of Neso's orbit around Neptune, viewed from above the ecliptic plane. The time starts at year 1600 and ends at 2400.

=== Group and origin ===
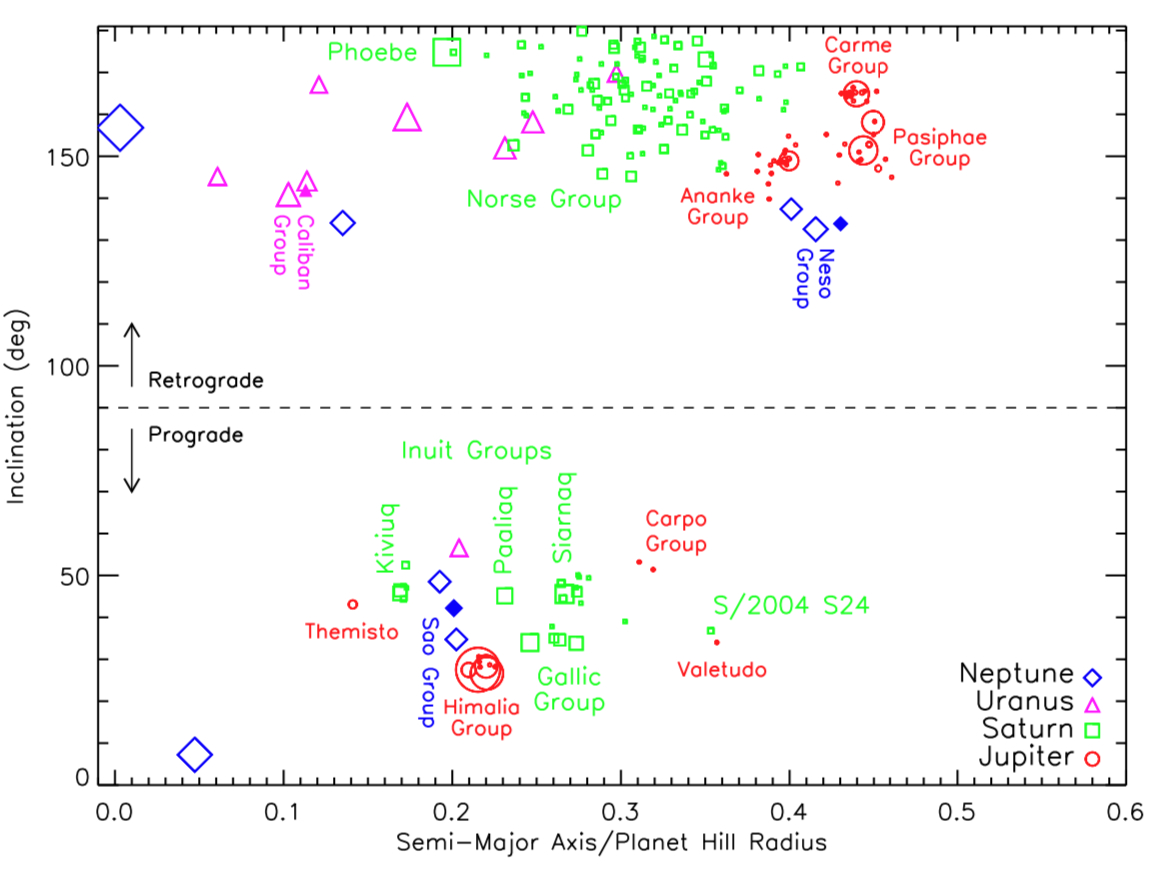
Irregular moons of all four giant planets, plotted by average distance from their planet (semi-major axis in Hill radii) and orbital inclination (degrees with respect to ecliptic). The Neso group is the cluster of retrograde moons labeled in blue.

Neso shares similar orbital characteristics with two other Neptunian irregular moons, Psamathe and S/2021 N 1. Together, they form the Neso group, a family of retrograde irregular moons of which Neso is the largest member. The Neso group was first suspected by astronomers in 2004 based on the similar orbits of Neso and Psamathe, but it was not confirmed until the discovery of S/2021 N 1 as a third member in 2024. (Note: S/2021 N 1 was discovered in 2021, but its orbit was not determined and published until 2024.) The group is predicted to contain many more smaller members, though they are too faint to be detected with current technology.

Because of their similar orbits, the moons of the Neso group have low mutual dispersion velocities of around 100 m/s. The dispersion velocity is the speed needed to eject a fragment from a parent body onto its current orbit. For fragments produced in collisions, their dispersion velocities are typically below 100 m/s, comparable to the parent body's escape velocity. This suggests that the Neso group is a collisional family, formed by the destruction of a once-larger parent body by a collision with an asteroid or comet billions of years ago. The parent body was probably an irregular moon that was gravitationally captured by Neptune during the Solar System's early history, during or shortly after the formation of the planets.

If the Neso group is a collisional family, then its members are expected to share similar surface characteristics, such as color. However, this remains yet to be verified, as Neso is the only member with a known surface color as of 2022.

== Physical characteristics ==
Little is known about Neso's physical characteristics. Viewed from Earth, Neso has an apparent magnitude of 25.6 in visible light (V band) and an apparent magnitude between 24.7 and 25.3 in red light (R band). With apparent magnitudes this dim, Neso and most of Neptune's irregular moons can only be observed through long-exposure imaging with large optical telescopes.

The diameter of Neso has not been directly measured, although it can be indirectly estimated from its brightness and an assumed geometric albedo. Assuming a geometric albedo of 0.04, Neso's diameter would be about 60 km (37 mi). For a higher albedo of 0.06, Neso would have a diameter of 43 km (27 mi). At these sizes, Neso's surface gravity is expected to be very low. Planetary scientist Erich Karkoschka speculated that on Neso, it would take roughly 30 seconds for an object to fall to the ground when dropped from human height. The rotation period of Neso is unknown.

The surface of Neso is presumably very cold and dimly illuminated, due to its great distance from the Sun. Its surface temperature is estimated to be comparable to that of Neptune's largest moon Triton, whose surface temperature is approximately 38 K (−235.2 °C; −391.3 °F). A 2018 analysis of Very Large Telescope observations found that the color of Neso's surface is similar to (if not slightly redder than) the typical colors of trans-Neptunian objects and centaurs, but not those of resonant trans-Neptunian objects. The colors of Neso and other Neptunian irregular moons indicate that they lack the "ultrared" material commonly seen on the surfaces of Kuiper belt objects, suggesting that their surfaces have been altered by collisions or sublimation of volatiles.

== See also ==
- Other Neptunian irregular moons discovered in 2002:
  - Halimede
  - Sao
  - Laomedeia
  - S/2002 N 5 (lost in 2002, confirmed much later in 2024)
