= Gravity darkening =

Astronomical phenomenon

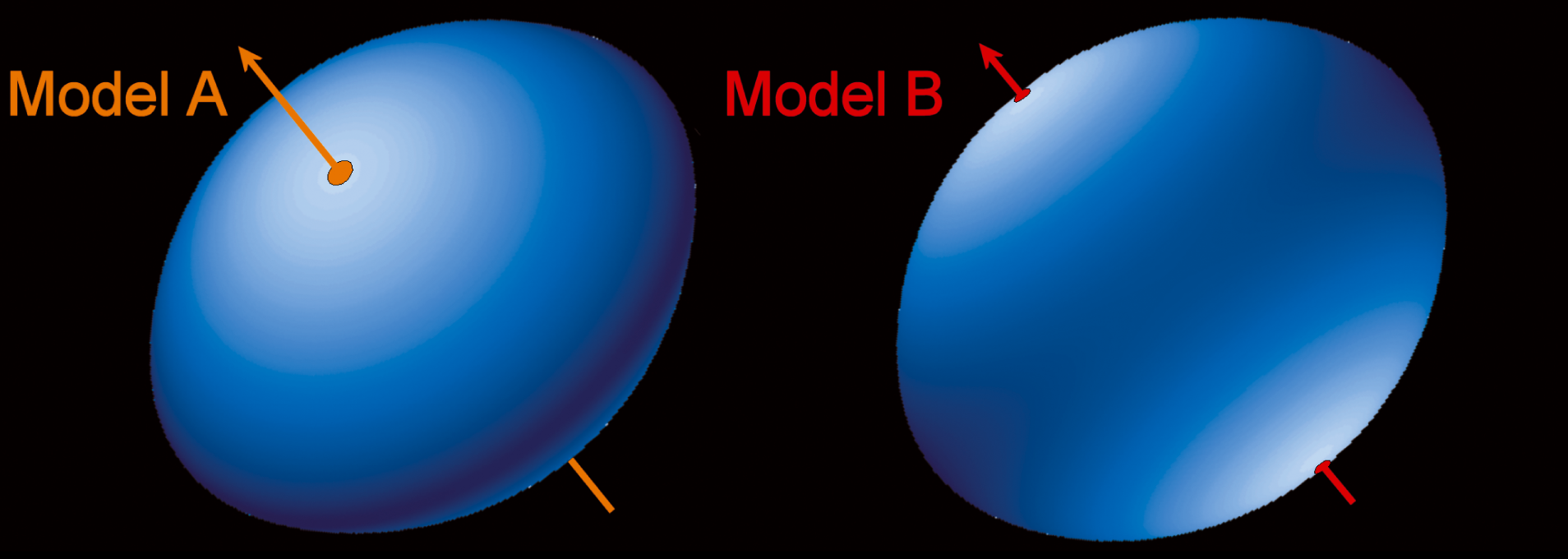
Achernar is a rapidly spinning star flattened into an oblate spheroid hotter and brighter at the poles.

Gravity darkening, also referred to as gravity brightening, is an astronomical phenomenon where the poles of a star are brighter than the equator, due to rapid rotation and oblate shape. When a star is oblate, it has a larger radius at its equator than it does at its poles. As a result, the poles have a higher surface gravity, and thus higher temperature and pressure is needed to maintain hydrostatic equilibrium. Thus, the poles are "gravity brightened", and the equator "gravity darkened".

The star becomes oblate (and hence gravity darkening occurs) because the centrifugal force resulting from rotation creates additional outward pressure on the star. The centrifugal force is expressed mathematically as

$$F_\text{centrifugal} = m \Omega^2 \rho,$$

where $m$ is mass (in this case of a small volume element of the star), $\Omega$ is the angular velocity, and $\rho$ is the radial distance from the axis of rotation. In the case of a star, the value of $\rho$ is largest at the equator and smallest at the poles. This means that equatorial regions of a star have a greater centrifugal force than the pole. The centrifugal force pushes mass away from the axis of rotation, resulting in less overall pressure on the gas in the equatorial regions of the star. This causes the gas in this region to become less dense, and cooler.

Von Zeipel's theorem states that the radiation from a star is proportional to the local effective gravity, that is to the gravity reduced by any centrifugal force at that location on the star's surface. Then the effective temperature is proportional to the fourth root of the effective gravity.
