= Hierotopy =

Hierotopy (from Ancient Greek: ἱερός, sacred + Ancient Greek: τόπος, place, space) is the creation of sacred spaces viewed as a special form of human creativity and also a related academic field where specific examples of such creativity are studied. The concept and the term were developed in 2002 by Russian art-historian and byzantinist Alexei Lidov. Hierotopy accounts for the ways in which a vast array of media (e.g. religious images, ritual, song, incense, light) are used to organize sacred spaces. As an academic field, it spans the disciplines of art history, archeology, cultural anthropology, ethnology and religious studies, but it possesses an object of study and a methodology of its own. It differs from the phenomenology of the sacred (which has been studied by Mircea Eliade, Rudolf Otto and Pavel Florensky) insofar as it focuses on historical examples of hierotopic projects, that is, projects establishing a medium of communication between the mundane and the sacred. Though related to religious mysticism, hierotopy deals first and foremost with forms of conscious, creative activity.

According to the hierotopic approach, icons and other sacred artifacts are viewed not as isolated objects, but as components of larger hierotopic projects. Though such artifacts often play a prominent role in hierotopic studies, it is these projects themselves – including both their conceptual and artistic aspects, as well as the historical developments leading to their formation – that are the primary focus of study. The role played by the creators of sacred spaces is also of chief importance, and could be compared with that of an artist. The creative element at work here resembles the work of contemporary film directors, for both involve the coordinated effort of various artists and specialists in shaping a single, comprehensive vision. One can consider as hierotopic examples King Solomon's construction of the First Temple, the erection of Hagia Sophia by Emperor Justinian, as well as the work of Abbot Suger in the conception of first Gothic cathedrals. Hierotopic projects are not limited to churches and sanctuaries; in other cases, landscapes, architectural compounds and even cities and countries have become products of hierotopic creativity.

The topics of hierotopic study cover a broad span of interests and range, for example, from the role played by light in church architecture to the study of religious ceremonies, feasts and folk customs. The comparison of hierotopic models at work in different cultures is another focus of interest.

Six international symposia (2004, 2006, 2009, 2011, 2014, 2017) have been organized on hierotopic subjects.

== Spatial icons ==
The concept of the spatial icon plays a central role in hierotopy and is used to describe the perception of sacred spaces. Spatial icons are understood to play a mediating role between the mundane and the sacred. They are mediatory images that are evoked, for example, in the space of a temple or sanctuary. Hierotopic creativity is a sort of art, which can be described as the creation of spatial icons. This concept applies to the way in which the perception of architecture, light, image, ritual practice, as well as various other components forming sacred spaces, is unified into a single vision. It is also used in the study both of "sacred landscapes", such as the New Jerusalem Monastery near Moscow, as well as of various ritual practices creating iconic medium, such as the Donkey walk in medieval Moscow. Spatial icons are essentially dynamic and performative in nature, such that the formal boundary between 'image' and 'beholder' no longer pertains. Typically, the beholders of spatial icons are actively involved in some way and become, to a certain extent, co-creators of the icons.

== Transfer of sacred spaces ==
The transfer of sacred spaces is an important form of hierotopic creativity. While an original sacred space often appears as the result of a theophany, such as a divine visitation or omen, this primary sacred space is then consciously reproduced in sanctuaries or temples as a spatial icon. For example, the construction of the First Temple, as recounted in the Old Testament, can be viewed as the reproduction of the sacred space of the Tabernacle. Similarly, in the design and construction of many Christian churches, the First Temple itself has been taken as a hierotopic prototype. Multiple "New Jerusalems" (reproductions of the Holy City of Jerusalem), aimed to establish a link to the space of the Holy Land, are common both to the Eastern and Western branches of the Christian tradition.

== Image-paradigms ==
The perception of sacred spaces has been analyzed by Lidov in terms of image-paradigms. According to his conception, an image-paradigm is a guiding image-vision that is created with the help of various media and that is aimed at evoking the same image in the mind of beholders of a sacred space. An image-paradigm, which is essentially different from an illustrative picture or representation, is a means of communication between the creators of sacred spaces and their beholders. It constitutes a kernel of meaning that gives form to an entire hierotopic project. As an example, the image of the Heavenly Jerusalem, which was present in Medieval churches without being directly represented, is one of the most significant image-paradigms in the Christian tradition.
