= Carpo (moon) =

Outer moon of Jupiter

- Carpo imaged by the Canada-France-Hawaii Telescope on 25 February 2003

Discovery
- Discovered by: Scott S. Sheppard
- Discovery site: Mauna Kea Obs.
- Discovery date: 26 February 2003

Designations
- Designation: Jupiter XLVI
- Pronunciation: /ˈkɑːrpoʊ/
- Named after: Καρπώ Karpō
- Alternative names: S/2003 J 20
- Adjectives: Carpoan /kɑːrˈpoʊən/ or Carpoian /kɑːrˈpoʊ.iən/

Orbital characteristics
- Epoch 1 January 2000 (JD 2451545.0)
- Observation arc: 22 years 2025-12-21 (last obs)
- Earliest precovery date: 9 February 2003
- Satellite of: Jupiter
- Group: Carpo

Proper orbital elements
- Proper semi-major axis: 17,042,300 km (0.113921 AU)
- Proper eccentricity: 0.416
- Proper inclination: 54.0° (to ecliptic)
- Proper orbital period: 1.24 years (454.40 d)
- Precession of asc. node: 11546.8914 arcsec / yr

Physical characteristics
- Mean diameter: ≈3 km
- Albedo: 0.04 (assumed)
- Apparent magnitude: 23.0
- Absolute magnitude (H): 16.2 (47 obs)

Carpo /ˈkɑːrpoʊ/, also Jupiter XLVI, is a small outer natural satellite of Jupiter. It was discovered by a team of astronomers from the University of Hawaiʻi led by Scott S. Sheppard in 2003, and was provisionally designated as S/2003 J 20 until it received its name in early 2005. It was named in March 2005 after Ancient Greek deity Carpo, one of the Horae, and a daughter of Zeus (Jupiter).

Carpo has a diameter of about 3 km (1.9 mi) for an absolute magnitude of 16.2. Like all irregular moons of Jupiter, Carpo's orbit is highly variable over time due to gravitational perturbations by the Sun and other planets. On average, Carpo's orbit has a semi-major axis of 17.0 million km (10.6 million mi), a high eccentricity of 0.42, and a very high inclination of 54° with respect to the ecliptic.

Carpo was long thought to be an outlier prograde satellite not part of any group, until S/2018 J 4 was found. The orbital inclination of satellites such as Carpo is limited by the Kozai effect, which induces a periodic exchange between the inclination and eccentricity of the orbit. If the inclination is large enough, the eccentricity can in turn grow so large that the periapsis of the satellite (called the perijove in the case of moons of Jupiter) would be in the immediate vicinity of the Galilean moons (Io, Europa, Ganymede and Callisto). The satellite would eventually collide with one of these, or a close encounter would eject it altogether from the Jovian system. Due to the Kozai effect, Carpo's argument of periapsis never precesses and instead librates about 90° with respect to the ecliptic, which keeps Carpo's perijove always above Jupiter and its apojove below (see orbit animation below).

== Gallery ==
Animation of Carpo's orbit from 2000 to 2100

Polar view

Equatorial view

Jupiter · Carpo · Callisto
