= 3040 Kozai =

Asteroid

Discovery
- Discovered by: W. Liller
- Discovery site: Cerro Tololo Obs.
- Discovery date: 23 January 1979

Designations
- Named after: Yoshihide Kozai (Japanese astronomer)
- Alternative designations: 1979 BA
- Minor planet category: Mars-crosser

Orbital characteristics
- Epoch 4 September 2017 (JD 2458000.5)
- Uncertainty parameter 0
- Observation arc: 38.36 yr (14,011 days)
- Aphelion: 2.2096 AU
- Perihelion: 1.4717 AU
- Semi-major axis: 1.8406 AU
- Eccentricity: 0.2004
- Orbital period (sidereal): 2.50 yr (912 days)
- Mean anomaly: 213.41°
- Inclination: 46.640°
- Longitude of ascending node: 143.51°
- Argument of perihelion: 290.19°

Physical characteristics
- Dimensions: 4–11 km (conversion)
- Spectral type: SMASS = S
- Absolute magnitude (H): 13.8

3040 Kozai, provisional designation 1979 BA, is a stony asteroid and Mars-crosser on a tilted orbit from the innermost regions of the asteroid belt, approximately 4 kilometers in diameter.

The asteroid was discovered by American astronomer William Liller at Cerro Tololo Inter-American Observatory in Chile, on 23 January 1979, and named after Japanese astronomer Yoshihide Kozai. It is considered a classical example of an object submitted to the Kozai effect, induced by an outer perturber, which in this case is the gas giant Jupiter.

== Orbit and classification ==
Kozai orbits the Sun in the inner main-belt at a distance of 1.5–2.2 AU once every 2 years and 6 months (912 days). Its orbit has an eccentricity of 0.20 and an inclination of 47° with respect to the ecliptic.

On 10 January 2044, the asteroid will make a close approach to Mars, passing the Red Planet at a distance of 0.034 AU (5,090,000 km).

== Physical characteristics ==
In the SMASS classification, Kozai is a common S-type asteroid. As of 2017, little is known about its size, composition, albedo and rotation.

With an absolute magnitude of 13.8, Kozai's diameter can be estimated to measure between 4 and 11 kilometers, for an assumed albedo in the range of 0.05–0.25. Since Kozai is a brighter S-type asteroid rather than a darker carbonaceous body, its diameter is on the lower end of NASA's generic conversion table, as the larger the body's diameter, the lower its albedo at a constant absolute magnitude.

== Naming ==
This minor planet was named in honour of 20th-century Japanese astronomer Yoshihide Kozai, discoverer of the periodic comet D/1977 C1 (Skiff-Kosai) and of the Kozai mechanism. The official naming citation was published by the Minor Planet Center on 2 July 1985 (M.P.C. 9770).
