= Kosai =

Kosai can stand for:

- Hiroki Kosai, 20th-century Japanese astronomer
- Kosai, Shizuoka, Japan, a city
- Kōsai, a disciple of Hōnen of the Jōdo Shū Buddhist sect
- Kosai river, near Kharagpur in the Indian state of West Bengal
- Count Kosai Uchida (or Uchida Yasuya), 19th-20th-century Japanese statesman and diplomat
- Wiang Kosai, a national park in the Phrae and Lampang provinces of Thailand
- Kosai or koose, an African pea fritter

== See also ==
- Kozai (disambiguation)
