= Spatial icon =

The concept of the spatial icon, introduced by Alexei Lidov, plays a central role in hierotopy and is used to describe the perception of sacred spaces. Spatial icons are image-visions, that are evoked, for example, in the space of a temple or sanctuary. The spatial icon encompasses a broad range of components involved in the formation and definition of sacred spaces. It is a consciously created spatial image that transcends the material objects involved in its formation. A variety of plastic elements, including everything from buildings to decoration, and from murals to liturgical artifacts, work together to form a spatial icon. Sacred relics and iconic images often play an integral role in the creation of a comprehensive spatial image. Various dynamic and performative media also play a significant role, such as rituals and song, as well as the artistic manipulation of natural light, lighting and sounds, and also elements dealing with odor and touch. From this point of view, Medieval churches can be seen as spatial icons in which divine image-visions, such as Paradise or Heavenly Jerusalem, were incarnated in the sacred space by means of the various media employed without being directly depicted. The temples and sanctuaries of various religions were originally conceived, designed and created as spatial icons. In the Christian tradition in particular, impressive examples of spatial icons are to be found in re-creations of the Holy Land, or "New Jerusalems". In many cases, spatial icons were the work of specific authors; their art could be compared with that of contemporary film directors, for in both cases, there is the coordinated effort of various artists and specialists in shaping a single, comprehensive vision.

Performativity, as well as various dynamic elements, is a significant feature of spatial icons. Unlike a statue or building, they are constantly in motion, changing with the movement and activity of ritual and celebration, as well as with the alteration of light, odor and the movements of those participating and inhabiting them. The Tuesday performance surrounding the Hodegetria icon in Constantinople and the Donkey walk taking place in Medieval Moscow are classical examples of iconic performativity in the Eastern Christian tradition. In both cases, the city itself was temporarily transformed into the matrix of a spatial icon; the participants involved in these rituals were thus veritable co-creators of the sacred space along with the artists, priests and celebrants responsible for leading it. Another example of this performative element at work in spatial icons can be found in the ritual creation and destruction of the sand mandala in the Buddhist tradition.
