= Edvard Hugo von Zeipel =

Swedish astronomer (1873–1959)

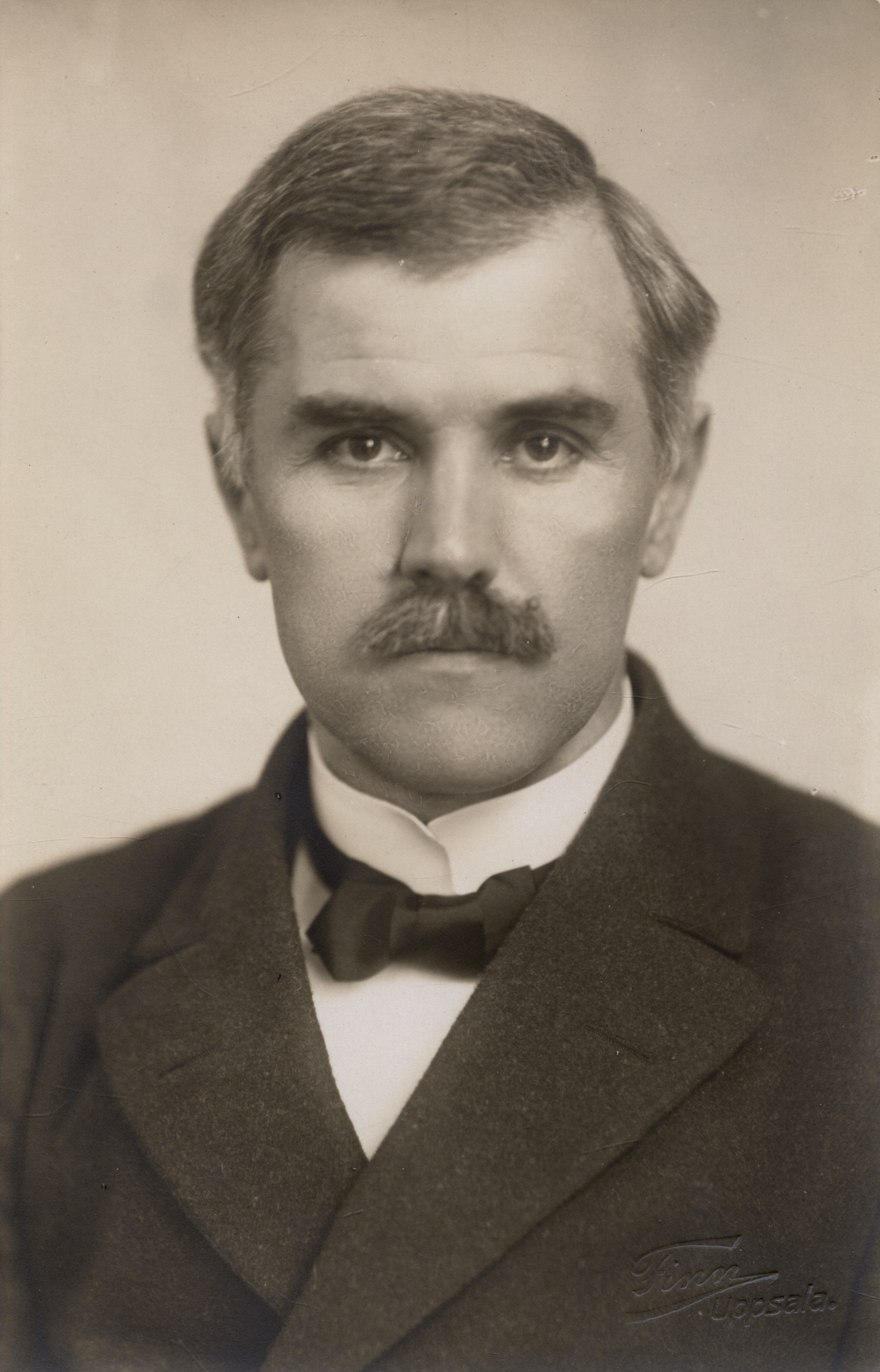
Hugo von Zeipel

Edvard Hugo von Zeipel (8 February 1873 – 8 June 1959) was a Swedish astronomer, with the specialist fields of study of celestial mechanics, astrophotography, and theoretical astrophysics. He worked at the Stockholm Observatory from 1897 to 1900, participated in scientific expeditions to Spitzbergen in 1898, 1901, and 1902, then worked at the Pulkovo Observatory from 1901 to 1902, the Paris observatory from 1904 to 1906, and the Uppsala Astronomical Observatory from 1911. He proved a key theorem about the Painlevé conjecture.

Von Zeipel specialized in 'celestial mechanics, especially distribution of stars and globular star clusters, asteroid motions, and problems of radiation equilibrium. "

In 1930, von Zeipel was awarded the A. Cressy Morrison Prize from the New York Academy of Sciences for his theory that "the stars like the Sun were recurrent novae."

== Named after von Zeipel ==
- The crater Von Zeipel on the Moon is named after him.
- 8870 von Zeipel is an asteroid discovered on March 6, 1992. It is also named after him.
- Von Zeipel theorem, linking stellar radiative flux to local effective gravity.
- von Zeipel-Lidov-Kozai mechanism
