= Yoshihide Kozai =

Japanese astronomer

- 古在由秀
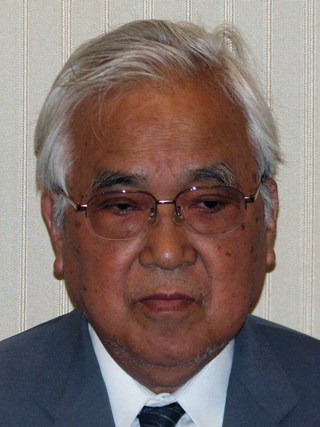
- Born: April 1, 1928; Tokyo, Japan
- Died: February 5, 2018 (aged 89); Tokyo, Japan
- Education: University of Tokyo
- Known for: Kozai mechanism
- Awards: Imperial Prize of the Japan Academy (1979); Brouwer Award (1989); Person of Cultural Merit (2009)
- Scientific career
- Workplaces: National Astronomical Observatory; Smithsonian Astrophysical Observatory

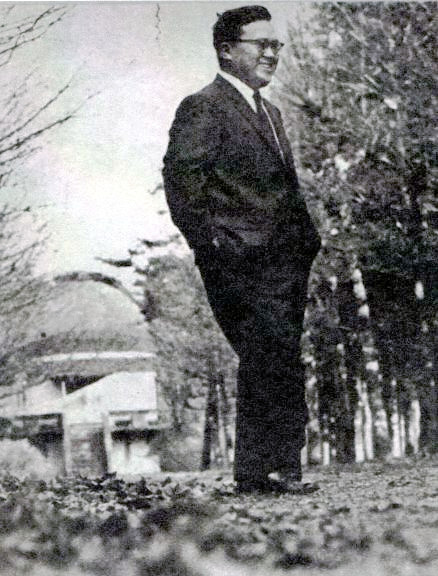
Kozai on Asahi Journal

Yoshihide Kozai (Japanese: 古在 由秀; 1 April 1928 – 5 February 2018) was a Japanese astronomer specialising in celestial mechanics. He is best known for discovering, simultaneously with Michael Lidov, the Kozai mechanism, for which he received the Imperial Prize of the Japan Academy in 1979. He was the first Japanese president of the International Astronomical Union from 1988 to 1991, and was director of the National Astronomical Observatory of Japan from 1988 to 1994. He was professor emeritus at the University of Tokyo, National Astronomical Observatory of Japan and The Graduate University for Advanced Studies.

== Biography ==
Kozai was born on 1 April 1928, in Tokyo. He graduated from the University of Tokyo, where he obtained his Doctor of Science.

He began his career as an assistant at the Tokyo Astronomical Observatory. In 1958, he was a visiting researcher at the Smithsonian Astrophysical Observatory and the Harvard College Observatory.

In 1963, he was appointed assistant professor at the University of Tokyo Astronomical Observatory. He received the Asahi Prize the same year. He became the director of the Domestic Satellite Computing Facility of the Tokyo Astronomical Observatory in 1965.

In 1966, Kozai was appointed professor at the University of Tokyo Astronomical Observatory. He became the director of the Dodaira Observatory in 1973, after which he was the director of the Tokyo Astronomical Observatory from 1981 to 1988 and the National Astronomical Observatory of Japan from 1988 to 1994.

He was awarded the Imperial Prize of the Japan Academy in 1979 for "Studies of Motions of Saturnian Satellites, Artificial Satellites, and Asteroids", including the discovery of the Kozai mechanism.

In 1988, Kozai became the first Japanese person to become the president of the International Astronomical Union. He served in the position until 1991.

In 1989, he received the Brouwer Award of the American Astronomical Society. He was awarded the Order of the Sacred Treasure in 2002. In 2009, he received the Decoration of Cultural Merit from the Japanese government.

He was the director of the Gunma Astronomical Observatory from 1997 to 2012, and its honorary director from 2012.

Kozai died on 5 February 2018 due to liver failure.

== Legacy ==
The asteroid 3040 Kozai is named in his honour.

== Awards and honors ==
- Asahi Prize (1963)
- Imperial Prize of the Japan Academy (1979)
- Brouwer Award (1989)
- Order of the Sacred Treasure (2002)
- Person of Cultural Merit (2009)
