= Mikhail Lidov =

Soviet/Russian astronomer

- Born: Mikhail Lvovich Lidov; 4 October 1926; Cherkasy, Ukrainian SSR, Soviet Union
- Died: 30 December 1993 (aged 67); Moscow, Russia
- Education: Moscow State University
- Known for: Kozai mechanism
- Children: Aleksey Lidov
- Awards: Lenin Prize
- Scientific career
- Fields: celestial mechanics
- Doctoral advisor: Leonid Sedov

Mikhail Lvovich Lidov (Russian: Михаи́л Льво́вич Ли́дов, 4 October 1926 – 30 December 1993) was a Soviet and Russian astronomer specialising in celestial mechanics. He is best known for discovering, simultaneously with Yoshihide Kozai, the Lidov–Kozai mechanism.

In 1960, he was awarded the Lenin Prize for his contributions to the Soviet space program.

The asteroid 4236 Lidov, discovered by Nikolai Chernykh in 1979, was named in his honour. The official naming citation was published by the Minor Planet Center on 1 September 1993 (M.P.C. 22501).
