= Aleksey Lidov =

Russian art historian (1959–2025)

Alexei Lidov
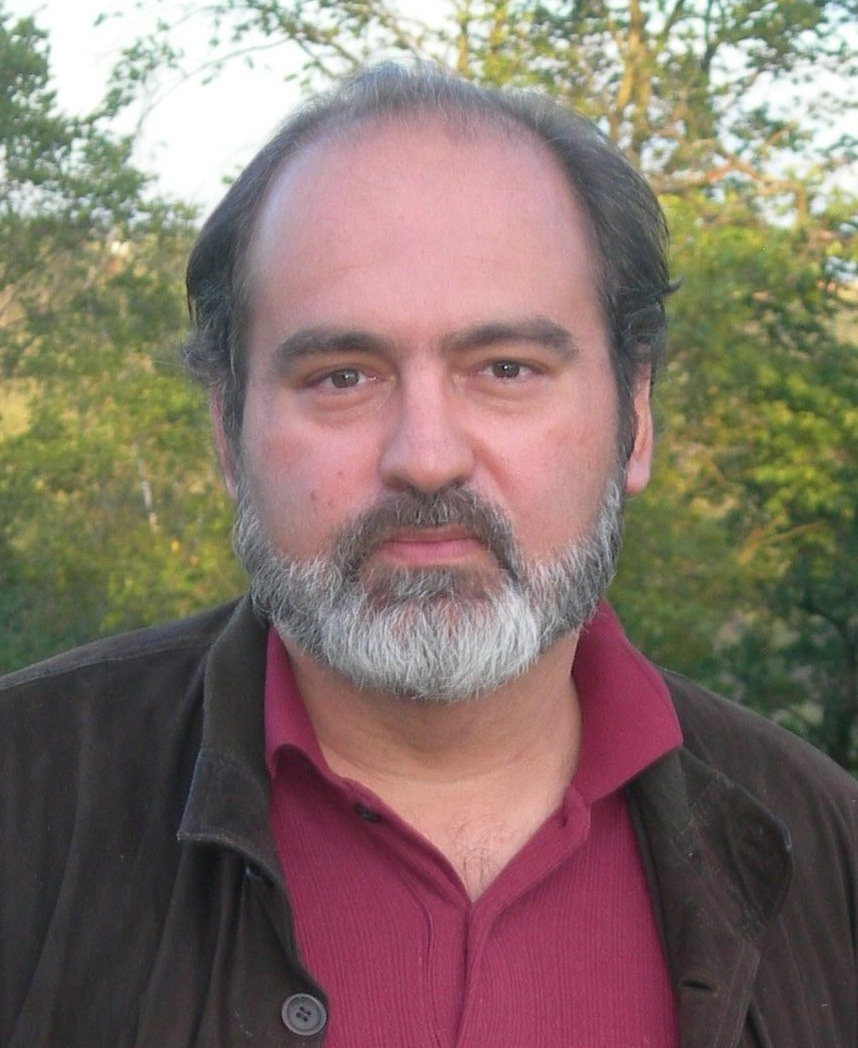
- Lidov in 2005
- Born: March 9, 1959; Moscow, Russian SFSR, Soviet Union
- Died: May 29, 2025 (aged 66)
- Education: Moscow State University
- Known for: Author of concepts: hierotopy, spatial icon
- Scientific career
- Fields: Iconography, Byzantine studies, religious studies
- Workplaces: Moscow State University, Institute of World Culture

Alexei Mikhailovich Lidov (Russian: Алексей́ Михай́лович Ли́дов; March 9, 1959 – May 29, 2025) was a Russian art historian and Byzantinist, an author of the concepts hierotopy and spatial icon, as well as a member of the Russian Academy of Arts.

== Life and career ==
Lidov was born in Moscow on March 9, 1959. His father, Mikhail Lidov, was a Russian space scientist; his mother, Diana, a mathematician, his sister, Anastasia Khvorova is an American biochemist. Upon graduation from the department of art history of the Moscow State University in 1981, his first appointment was at the State Museum of Oriental Art in Moscow. He earned a PhD in art history from Moscow State University in 1989. In 1991, he founded the Research Center for the Eastern Christian Culture, an independent non-governmental organization, and has worked as its director. In 2008—2009 he served as the vice-president of the Russian Academy of Art. Since 2010 he works at the Institute of World Culture at Moscow State University as director of the Department of Ancient Culture. Lidov had lectured at Princeton, Harvard, Columbia, Oxford, Cambridge, Sorbonne universities et al. He initiated several research programs and organized nine international symposia on iconographical and hierotopical subjects.

Lidov died on May 29, 2025, at the age of 66.

== Research ==
During his studies at the University of Moscow Lidov specialized in the Byzantine art history. While working as a researcher at the State Museum of Oriental Art, he studied the Christian art of Armenia and Georgia. Building upon the material of his PhD thesis, he published in 1991 his first book about the mural paintings of the Akhtala monastery in Armenia. In this book he characterized the art of chalcedonian Armenians as a separate iconographic tradition, which combined Byzantine, Georgian and Armenian elements.

Drawing upon the seminal works of A. Grabar, H.Belting, H. Maguire and Chr. Walter, Lidov developed a method of interpretational iconography, which he put into practice in his study of liturgical themes in the Byzantine art and of the symbolism of Heavenly Jerusalem. Lidov has shown that new theological ideas, formulated in the wake of the Great Schism of 1054, engendered a new kind of Byzantine church iconography with the dominant themes of Christ the Priest and the Communion of the Apostles. After his trip to the Saint Catherine's Monastery in 1996, Lidov published a book-album with the description of its unique collection of icons.

Later, Lidov turned to the study of miracle-working icons and Christian relics, which was quite a new subject in art history. In 2000 he initiated a program of research and cultural activities “Christian relics”, which included, in particular, two exhibitions and an international conference. During this period Lidov wrote several papers on the Hodegetria of Constantinople and the Holy Mandylion. While studying the role of miraculous icons and relics in the formation of sacred spaces in the Eastern Christian tradition, Lidov has formulated a new concept of hierotopy. The term hierotopy has two meanings. It is the creation of sacred spaces as a special form of human creativity and also a related academic field, which spans art history, archaeology, anthropology, and religious studies. Hierotopy accounts not only for artistic images and the symbolic world they form, but also for the entire collection of various media that serve to organize a sacred space into a spatial icon. The perception of sacred spaces has been analyzed by Lidov in terms of image-paradigms, which reflect the experience of a sacred space in its wholeness and are distinct from any illustrative pictures.

== Awards and honors ==
- Russian Academy of Arts – corresponding member since 2007, full member since 2012
- Gold medal of the Russian Academy of Arts for the book.
- Distinguished visiting professor of the University of York, 2011
- The Medal of Merit of the Russian Academy of Arts, 2014
- The Order for Merits to Arts conferred by the Russian Academy of Arts, 2014
- The Order of Friendship of Armenia, 2016
- Christensen Fellow at St Catherine's College, Oxford, 2017

== Books (author) ==
- The Mural Paintings of Akhtala. Moscow, 1991
- Byzantine Icons of Sinai. Moscow-Athens, 1999
- The Holy Face in Russian Icons. Moscow, 2005 (with L. Evseeva and N. Chugreeva)
- Hierotopy. Spatial Icons and Image-paradigms in Byzantine Culture. Moscow, 2010
- The Icon. The World of the Holy Images in Byzantium and the Medieval Russia. Moscow: Theoria, 2013
- The Wall Paintings of Akhtala Monastery. History, Iconography, Masters. Moscow: Dmitry Pozharsky University, 2014

== Books (editor) ==
- Jerusalem in the Russian culture. Moscow, 1994
- Eastern Christian Churches. Liturgy and art. Moscow, 1994
- Miracle-working icons in Byzantium and old Russia, 1996
- The Miraculos image. Icons of Our Lady in the Tretyakov gallery. Moscow, 1999
- Christian relics in the Moscow Kremlin. Moscow, 2000
- Iconostasis: origins, evolution, symbolism. Moscow, 2000
- Eastern Christian relics. Moscow, 2003
- Relics in Byzantium and Medieval Russia. Written sources. Moscow, 2006
- Hierotopy. Creation of sacred spaces in Byzantium and Medieval Russia. Moscow, 2006
- Spatial icons. Textual and performative. Materials of the international symposium. Moscow, 2009
- Hierotopy. Comparative studies of sacred spaces. Moscow, 2009
- New Jerusalems. Hierotopy and iconography of sacred spaces. Moscow, 2009
- Spatial icons. Performativity in Byzantium and Medieval Russia. Moscow, 2011
- Hierotopy of Light and Fire in the Culture of the Byzantine World. Moscow, 2013
- The Life-Giving Source. Water in the hierotopy and iconography of the Christian world. Materials of the international symposium. Moscow, 2014.
- Holy water in the hierotopy and iconography of the Christian World. Moscow, 2017
- Air and heavens in the hierotopy and iconography of the Christian world. Materials of the international symposium. Moscow, 2019.
- The hierotopy of holy mountains in Christian culture. Moscow, 2019

== Books dedicated to Lidov's 60th anniversary ==
- Space of the icon. Iconography and hierotopy. Moscow, 2019 (eds. M. Bacci, J. Bogdanovich)
- Icons of space. Advances in hierotopy. London&NY, 2021 (ed. J. Bogdanovich)

== Selected publications ==
- L’Image du Christ-prelat dans le programme iconographique de Sainte Sophia d’Ohride. In: Arte Cristiana, fasc. 745. Milano, 1991, p. 245–250
- L’art des Armeniens Chalcedoniens Atti del Quinto Simposio Internazionale di Arte Armena 1988, Venezia 1992, pp. 479–495
- Christ the Priest in Byzantine Church Decoration of the Eleventh and Twelfth Centuries. Selected papers of the 18th International Congress of Byzantine Studies. Moscow, 1991. Vol.III: Art History, Architecture, Music. Shepherdstown, WV, 1996, pp. 158–170
- Byzantine Church Decoration and the Schism of 1054. Byzantion, LXVIII/2 (1998), pp. 381–405.
- Heavenly Jerusalem: the Byzantine Approach. In: «The Real and Ideal Jerusalem in Art of Judaism, Christianity and Islam». Jerusalem, 1998, pp. 341–353
- Byzantine Church Decoration and the Schism of 1054. Byzantion, LXVIII/2 (1998), pp. 381–405
- Miracle-Working Icons of the Mother of God. In: «Mother of God. Representation of the Virgin in Byzantine Art». Athens, ‘Skira’, 2000, pp. 47–57
- The Miracle of Reproduction. The Mandylion and Keramion as a paradigm of sacred space. In: «L’Immagine di Cristo dall. Acheropiita dalla mano d’artista» Editors C. Frommel and G. Wolf. Citta del Vaticano. Rome, 2006
- The Flying Hodegetria. The Miraculous Icon as Bearer of Sacred Space. In: «The Miraculous Image in the Late Middle Ages and Renaissance». Editors E. Thuno, G. Wolf. Rome, 2004
- Leo the Wise and the Miraculous Icons in Hagia Sophia. In: «The Heroes of the Orthodox Church. The New Saints, 8th to 16th century». Editor E. Kountura-Galaki. Athens, 2004
- The Canopy over the Holy Sepulchre: On the Origins of Onion-Shaped Domes. In: «Jerusalem in Russian Culture». New York, 2005
- «Il Dio russo». Culto e iconografia di San Nikola nell’antica Russia. In: «San Nicola. Splendori d’arte d’Oriente e d’Occidente». Editor M. Bacci. Milano, 2006
- The Mandylion over the Gate. A mental pilgrimage to the holy city of Edessa. In: "Routes of Faith in the Medieval Mediterranean. Thessaloniki, 2008, pp.179–192.
- 'Image-Paradigms' as a Notion of Mediterranean Visual Culture: a Hierotopic Approach to Art History. In: «Crossing Cultures. Papers of the International Congress of Art History». CIHA 2008. Melbourne, 2009, pp. 177–183
- A Byzantine Jerusalem.The Imperial Pharos Chapel as the Holy Sepulchre In: Jerusalem as Narrative Space, ed. Annette Hoffmann and Gerhard Wolf, Leiden, Boston: Koninklijke Brill, 2012, pp. 63–104.
- The Temple Veil as a Spatial Icon. Revealing an Image-Paradigm of Medieval Iconography and Hierotopy. IKON, 2014, 7, pp. 97–108.
