= Laplace sphere =

Region in space where a satellite orbit is stable

In astronomy and orbital mechanics, the Laplace sphere concerns a specific kind of three-body problem with orbits. The prototype idea is to study the Sun-Earth-Moon system, and determine if it would be possible for the Sun to steal away the Moon from Earth orbit, into solar orbit. More generally, it is applied to any satellite of a body (often called the 'planet') that is, in turn, orbiting a much more massive body (often called the 'star'). Besides the moon, the satellite is usually a small asteroid, exoplanet, or a spacecraft that is orbiting the earth.

The Laplace sphere is a region around a planet where a satellite would maintain a stable orbit around the planet, rather than being pulled off toward the star, with its greater gravitational force, despite its larger distance. The 'sphere' region is actually an ellipsoid, specifically a prolate spheroid with its long axis perpendicular to the star-planet orbit. This results in the fact that the satellite with an eccentric orbit is safer with its apsis pointing up or down, than pointing in the plane of the planet's orbit. The derivation eliminates higher-order terms on the assumption that the star's mass is much larger than the planet's, and the planet's mass is much larger than the satellite's.

== See also ==
- Hill sphere
