= Von Zeipel theorem =

Astrophysics concept

In astrophysics, the von Zeipel theorem states that the radiative flux $F$ in a uniformly rotating star is proportional to the local effective gravity $g_\text{eff}$. The theorem is named after Swedish astronomer Edvard Hugo von Zeipel.

The theorem is:

$$F = -\frac{L(P)}{4\pi G M_*(P)} g_\text{eff},$$

where the luminosity $L$ and mass $M_*$ are evaluated on a surface of constant pressure $P$. The effective temperature $T_\text{eff}$ can then be found at a given colatitude $\theta$ from the local effective gravity:

$$T_\text{eff}(\theta) \sim g_\text{eff}^{1/4}(\theta).$$

This relation ignores the effect of convection in the envelope, so it primarily applies to early-type stars.

According to the theory of rotating stars, if the rotational velocity of a star depends only on the radius, it cannot simultaneously be in thermal and hydrostatic equilibrium. This is called the von Zeipel paradox. The paradox is resolved, however, if the rotational velocity also depends on height, or there is a meridional circulation. A similar situation may arise in accretion disks.
