= Kozai mechanism =

Phenomenon affecting the orbit of a binary system

In celestial mechanics, the Kozai mechanism is a dynamical phenomenon affecting the orbit of a binary system perturbed by a distant third body under certain conditions. The mechanism is also named von Zeipel–Kozai–Lidov, Lidov–Kozai, Kozai–Lidov, etc., and may be termed an effect, oscillation, cycle, or resonance. This effect causes the orbit's argument of pericenter to oscillate about a constant value, which in turn leads to a periodic exchange between its eccentricity and inclination. The process occurs on timescales much longer than the orbital periods. It can drive an initially near-circular orbit to arbitrarily high eccentricity, and flip an initially moderately inclined orbit between a prograde and a retrograde motion.

The effect has been found to be an important factor shaping the orbits of irregular satellites of the planets, trans-Neptunian objects, extrasolar planets, and multiple star systems. It hypothetically promotes black hole mergers. It was described in 1961 by Mikhail Lidov while analyzing the orbits of artificial and natural satellites of planets. In 1962, Yoshihide Kozai published this same result in application to the orbits of asteroids perturbed by Jupiter. The citations of the papers by Kozai and Lidov have risen sharply in the 21st century. As of 2017, the mechanism is among the most studied astrophysical phenomena. It was pointed out in 2019 by Takashi Ito and Katsuhito Ohtsuka that the Swedish astronomer Edvard Hugo von Zeipel had also studied this mechanism in 1909, and his name is sometimes now added.

== Background ==
=== Hamiltonian mechanics ===
In Hamiltonian mechanics, a physical system is specified by a function, called Hamiltonian and denoted $\mathcal{H}$, of canonical coordinates in phase space. The canonical coordinates consist of the generalized coordinates $x_k$ in configuration space and their conjugate momenta $p_k$, for $k = 1, ... N$, for the N bodies in the system ($N = 3$ for the von Zeipel-Kozai–Lidov effect). The number of $(x_k, p_k)$ pairs required to describe a given system is the number of its degrees of freedom.

The coordinate pairs are usually chosen in such a way as to simplify the calculations involved in solving a particular problem. One set of canonical coordinates can be changed to another by a canonical transformation. The equations of motion for the system are obtained from the Hamiltonian through Hamilton's canonical equations, which relate time derivatives of the coordinates to partial derivatives of the Hamiltonian with respect to the conjugate momenta.

=== Three-body problem ===
The dynamics of a system composed of three bodies system acting under their mutual gravitational attraction is chaotic: its behavior over long periods of time is enormously sensitive to any slight changes in the initial conditions. This exposes computations to rapid deterioration from uncertainties in those conditions, in determining them, and then preserving them from rounding away in computer arithmetic. The practical consequence is that, the three-body problem cannot be solved analytically for an indefinite amount of time, except in special cases. Instead, numerical methods are used for forecast-times limited by the available precision.

The Lidov–Kozai mechanism is a feature of hierarchical triple systems, that is systems in which one of the bodies, called the "perturber", is located far from the other two, which are said to comprise the inner binary. The perturber and the centre of mass of the inner binary comprise the outer binary. Such systems are often studied by using the methods of perturbation theory to write the Hamiltonian of a hierarchical three-body system as a sum of two terms responsible for the isolated evolution of the inner and the outer binary, and a third term coupling the two orbits,

$$\mathcal{H} = \mathcal{H}_{\rm in} + \mathcal{H}_{\rm out} + \mathcal{H}_{\rm pert}.$$

The coupling term is then expanded in the orders of parameter $\alpha$, defined as the ratio of the semi-major axes of the inner and the outer binary and hence small in a hierarchical system. Since the perturbative series converges rapidly, the qualitative behaviour of a hierarchical three-body system is determined by the initial terms in the expansion, referred to as the quadrupole ($\propto\alpha^2$), octupole ($\propto\alpha^3$) and hexadecapole ($\propto\alpha^4$) order terms,

$$\mathcal{H}_{\rm pert} = \mathcal{H}_{\rm quad} + \mathcal{H}_{\rm oct} + \mathcal{H}_{\rm hex} + O(\alpha^5).$$

For many systems, a satisfactory description is found already at the lowest, quadrupole order in the perturbative expansion. The octupole term becomes dominant in certain regimes and is responsible for a long-term variation in the amplitude of the Lidov–Kozai oscillations.

==== Secular approximation ====
The Lidov–Kozai mechanism is a secular effect, that is, it occurs on timescales much longer compared to the orbital periods of the inner and the outer binary. In order to simplify the problem and make it more tractable computationally, the hierarchical three-body Hamiltonian can be secularised, that is, averaged over the rapidly varying mean anomalies of the two orbits. Through this process, the problem is reduced to that of two interacting massive wire loops.

== Overview of the mechanism ==
=== Test particle limit ===
The simplest treatment of the von Zeipel-Lidov–Kozai mechanism assumes that one of the inner binary's components, the secondary, is a test particle – an idealized point-like object with negligible mass compared to the other two bodies, the primary and the distant perturber. These assumptions are valid, for instance, in the case of an artificial satellite in a low Earth orbit that is perturbed by the Moon, or a short-period comet that is perturbed by Jupiter.

The Keplerian orbital elements.

Under these approximations, the orbit-averaged equations of motion for the secondary have a conserved quantity: the component of the secondary's orbital angular momentum parallel to the angular momentum of the primary / perturber orbit. This conserved quantity can be expressed in terms of the secondary's eccentricity e and inclination i relative to the plane of the outer binary:

$$L_\mathrm{z} = \sqrt{ 1-e^2 \;}\, \cos i = \mathrm{constant}$$

Conservation of L_{z} means that orbital eccentricity can be "traded for" inclination. Thus, near-circular, highly inclined orbits can become very eccentric. Since increasing eccentricity while keeping the semimajor axis constant reduces the distance between the objects at periapsis, this mechanism can cause comets (perturbed by Jupiter) to become sungrazing.

Lidov–Kozai oscillations will be present if L_{z} is lower than a certain value. At the critical value of L_{z}, a "fixed-point" orbit appears, with constant inclination given by

$$i_\mathrm{crit} = \arccos \left( \sqrt{\frac{3}{5}\,}\, \right) \approx 39.2^\mathsf{o}$$

For values of L_{z} less than this critical value, there is a one-parameter family of orbital solutions having the same L_{z} but different amounts of variation in e or i. Remarkably, the degree of possible variation in i is independent of the masses involved, which only set the timescale of the oscillations.

==== Timescale ====
The basic timescale associated with Kozai oscillations is:

$$T_\mathrm{ Kozai} = 2 \pi\,\frac{\,\sqrt{G\,M\;}\,}{G\,m_2}\,\frac{\,a_2^3\,}{a^{3/2}}\left( 1 - e_2^2 \right)^{3/2} = \frac{M}{m_2} \frac{\,P_2^2\,}{P}\,\left( 1 - e_2^2\right )^{3/2}$$

where a indicates the semimajor axis, P is orbital period, e is eccentricity and m is mass; variables with subscript "2" refer to the outer (perturber) orbit and variables lacking subscripts refer to the inner orbit; M is the mass of the primary. For example, with Moon's period of 27.3 days, eccentricity 0.055 and the Global Positioning System satellites period of half a (sidereal) day, the Kozai timescale is a little over 4 years; for geostationary orbits it is twice shorter.

The period of oscillation of all three variables (e, i, ω – the last being the argument of periapsis) is the same, but depends on how "far" the orbit is from the fixed-point orbit, becoming very long for the separatrix orbit that separates librating orbits from oscillating orbits.

== Astrophysical implications ==
=== Solar System ===
The von Zeipel-Lidov–Kozai mechanism causes the argument of pericenter (ω) to librate about either 90° or 270°, which is to say that its periapse occurs when the body is farthest from the equatorial plane. This effect is part of the reason that Pluto is dynamically protected from close encounters with Neptune.

The Lidov–Kozai mechanism places restrictions on the orbits possible within a system. For example:

For a regular satellite
If the orbit of a planet's moon is highly inclined to the planet's orbit, the eccentricity of the moon's orbit will increase until, at closest approach, the moon is destroyed by tidal forces.
For irregular satellites
The growing eccentricity will result in a collision with a regular moon, the planet, or alternatively, the growing apocenter may push the satellite outside the Hill sphere. Recently, the Hill-stability radius has been found as a function of satellite inclination, also explains the non-uniform distribution of irregular satellite inclinations.

The mechanism has been invoked in searches for Planet Nine, a hypothetical planet orbiting the Sun far beyond the orbit of Neptune.

A number of moons have been found to be in the Lidov–Kozai resonance with their planet, including Jupiter's Carpo and Euporie, Saturn's Kiviuq and Ijiraq, Uranus's Margaret, and Neptune's Sao and Neso.

Some sources identify the Soviet space probe Luna 3 as the first example of an artificial satellite undergoing Lidov–Kozai oscillations. Launched in 1959 into a highly inclined, eccentric, geocentric orbit, it was the first mission to photograph the far side of the Moon. It burned in the Earth's atmosphere after completing eleven revolutions. However, according to Gkolias et al. (2016), a different mechanism must have driven the decay of the probe's orbit since the Lidov–Kozai oscillations would have been thwarted by effects of the Earth's oblateness.

=== Extrasolar planets ===
The von Zeipel–Lidov–Kozai mechanism, in combination with tidal friction, is able to produce Hot Jupiters, which are gas giant exoplanets orbiting their stars on tight orbits. The high eccentricity of the planet HD 80606 b in the HD 80606/80607 system is likely due to the Kozai mechanism. KELT-19 Ab is likely to have the evidence of Kozai mechanism due to primordial misalignments between the planetary orbital axis and stellar spin axis with its orbit flipped.

=== Black holes ===
The mechanism is thought to affect the growth of central black holes in dense star clusters. It also drives the evolution of certain classes of binary black holes and may play a role in enabling black hole mergers.

== History and development ==
The effect was first described in 1909 by the Swedish astronomer Hugo von Zeipel in his work on the motion of periodic comets in Astronomische Nachrichten. In 1961, the Soviet space scientist Mikhail Lidov discovered the effect while analyzing the orbits of artificial and natural satellites of planets. Originally published in Russian, the result was translated into English in 1962.

Lidov first presented his work on artificial satellite orbits at the Conference on General and Applied Problems of Theoretical Astronomy held in Moscow on 20–25 November 1961. His paper was first published in a Russian-language journal in 1961. The Japanese astronomer Yoshihide Kozai was among the 1961 conference participants. Kozai published the same result in a widely read English-language journal in 1962, using the result to analyze orbits of asteroids perturbed by Jupiter. Since Lidov was the first to publish, many authors use the term Lidov–Kozai mechanism. Others, however, name it as the Kozai–Lidov or just the Kozai mechanism.
