= Hill sphere =

Region in which an astronomical body dominates the attraction of satellites

In sectional/side view, a two-dimensional representation of the three-dimensional concept of the Hill sphere. Gravitational potential ("gravity well") of Earth. Gravitational potential of the Moon. Their combined potential. Point P is the force free spot, where gravitational forces of Earth and Moon cancel. The sizes of Earth and Moon are in proportion, but distances and energies are not to scale.

In celestial mechanics, the Hill sphere is a common model for the calculation of a gravitational sphere of influence. It is the most commonly used model to calculate the spatial extent of gravitational influence of an astronomical body (m) in which it dominates over the gravitational influence of other bodies, particularly a primary (M). It is sometimes confused with other models of gravitational influence, such as the Laplace sphere or the Roche sphere, the latter of which causes confusion with the Roche limit. It was defined by the American astronomer George William Hill, based on the work of the French astronomer Édouard Roche.

To be retained by a more massive, hence more gravitationally attracting, astrophysical object—a planet by a star, a moon by a planet—the less massive body must have an orbit that lies within the gravitational potential represented by the more massive body's Hill sphere. That moon would, in turn, have a Hill sphere of its own, and any object within that distance would tend to become a satellite of the moon, rather than of the planet itself.

The formula for the Hill sphere, as derived by George William Hill, is
$$r_h=r{3}\sqrt[m/3M]$$

where r_{h} is the radius of the hill sphere, r is the distance between the small and large bodies, m is the mass of the less massive body and M is the mass of the more massive body.

A contour plot of the gravitational potential of a two-body system, here, the Sun and Earth, indicating the five Lagrange points.

One simple view of the extent of the Solar System is that it is bounded by the Hill sphere of the Sun (engendered by the Sun's interaction with the galactic nucleus or other more massive stars). A more complex example is the one at right, the Earth's Hill sphere, which extends between the Lagrange points L_{1} and L_{2}, which lie along the line of centers of the Earth and the more massive Sun. The gravitational influence of the less massive body is least in that direction, and so it acts as the limiting factor for the size of the Hill sphere; beyond that distance, a third object in orbit around the Earth would spend at least part of its orbit outside the Hill sphere, and would be progressively perturbed by the tidal forces of the more massive body, the Sun, eventually ending up orbiting the latter.

== Definition ==
The Hill sphere has been described as "the region around a planetary body where its own gravity (compared to that of the Sun or other nearby bodies) is the dominant force in attracting satellites," both natural and artificial.

As described by de Pater and Lissauer, all bodies within a system such as the Sun's Solar System "feel the gravitational force of one another", and while the motions of just two gravitationally interacting bodies—constituting a "two-body problem"—are "completely integrable ([meaning]...there exists one independent integral or constraint per degree of freedom)" and thus an exact, analytic solution, the interactions of three (or more) such bodies "cannot be deduced analytically", requiring instead solutions by numerical integration, when possible. This is the case, unless the negligible mass of one of the three bodies allows approximation of the system as a two-body problem, known formally as a "restricted three-body problem".

For such two- or restricted three-body problems as its simplest examples—e.g., one more massive primary astrophysical body, mass of $m_1$, and a less massive secondary body, mass of $m_2$—the concept of a Hill radius or sphere is of the approximate limit to the secondary mass's "gravitational dominance", a limit defined by "the extent" of its Hill sphere, which is represented mathematically as follows:

$$R_{\mathrm{H}} \approx a \sqrt[3]{\frac{m_2}{3(m_1+m_2)}} = a \sqrt[3]{\frac{1}{3(\frac{m_1}{m_2}+1)}}$$,

where, in this representation, semi-major axis "$a$" can be understood as the "instantaneous heliocentric distance" between the two masses (elsewhere abbreviated rp).

More generally written to account for changes in the actual separation between the two, if the less massive body, $m_2$, orbits a more massive body, $m_1$(e.g., as a planet orbiting around the Sun), and has a semi-major axis $a$, and an eccentricity of $e$, then the Hill radius or sphere, $R_{\mathrm{H}}$ of the less massive body, calculated at the pericenter, is approximately:

$R_{\mathrm{H}} = a {\frac{(1-e^2)}{(1+e \cos(\theta))}} \sqrt[3]{\frac{m_2}{3(m_1+m_2)}} = a {\frac{(1-e^2)}{(1+e \cos(\theta))}}\sqrt[3]{\frac{1}{3(\frac{m_1}{m_2}+1)}}$ where $\theta$ is the true anomaly for the less massive body in its orbit around the more massive body, an angle contained between 0° and 360°,

with $\cos(\theta)$ varying between +1 at the periapsis, $\theta = 0$, and -1 at the apoapsis, $\theta = 180$.

With $(1-e^2) = (1+e)(1-e)$,

$R_{\mathrm{H}} = a (1-e) \sqrt[3]{\frac{m_2}{3(m_1+m_2)}} = a (1-e)\sqrt[3]{\frac{1}{3(\frac{m_1}{m_2}+1)}}$ at the perigee and
$R_{\mathrm{H}} = a (1+e) \sqrt[3]{\frac{m_2}{3(m_1+m_2)}} = a (1+e)\sqrt[3]{\frac{1}{3(\frac{m_1}{m_2}+1)}}$ at the apogee, in the case of the Earth–Moon system, for example, ${\frac{m_2}{m_1}} = 0.0123000371(4)$ and ${\frac{m_1}{m_2}} \approx 81.300568$, $a = 384,399 \ km$, $e = 0.05490$ and the Hill radius of the Moon at the perigee is $R_{\mathrm{H}} = 57,910 \ km$, and at the apogee is $64,638 \ km$.

When eccentricity is negligible (the most favourable case for orbital stability), this expression reduces to the one presented above.

== Example and derivation ==
A schematic, not-to-scale representation of Hill spheres (as 2D radii) and Roche limits of each body of the Sun–Earth–Moon system. The actual Hill radius for the Moon is on the order of 60,000 km (i.e., extending less than one-sixth the distance of the 378,000 km between the Moon and the Earth).

In the Earth–Sun example, the Earth (5.97×10^{24} kg) orbits the Sun (1.99×10^{30} kg) at a distance of 149.6 million km, or one astronomical unit (AU). The Hill sphere for Earth thus extends out to about 1.5 million km (0.01 AU). The Moon's orbit, at a distance of 0.384 million km from Earth, is comfortably within the gravitational sphere of influence of Earth and it is therefore not at risk of being pulled into an independent orbit around the Sun. The Sun's Hill sphere has an unstable maximum boundary of 230,000 AU (1.1 pc; 3.6 ly).

The earlier eccentricity-ignoring formula can be re-stated as follows:

$\frac{R^3_{\mathrm{H}}}{a^3} \approx 1/3 \frac{m_2}{M}$, or $3\frac{R^3_{\mathrm{H}}}{a^3} \approx \frac{m_2}{M}$,

where M is the sum of the interacting masses.

=== Derivation ===
The expression for the Hill radius can be found by equating gravitational and centrifugal forces acting on a test particle (of mass much smaller than $m$) orbiting the secondary body. Assume that the distance between masses $M$ and $m$ is $r$, and that the test particle is orbiting at a distance $r_{\mathrm{H}}$ from the secondary. When the test particle is on the line connecting the primary and the secondary body, the force balance requires that

$$\frac{Gm}{r^2_{\mathrm{H}}}-\frac{GM}{(r-r_{\mathrm{H}})^2}+\Omega^2(r-r_{\mathrm{H}})=0,$$

where $G$ is the gravitational constant and $\Omega=\sqrt{\frac{GM}{r^3}}$ is the (Keplerian) angular velocity of the secondary about the primary (assuming that $m\ll M$). The above equation can also be written as

$$\frac{m}{r^2_{\mathrm{H}}}-\frac{M}{r^2}\left(1-\frac{r_{\mathrm{H}}}{r}\right)^{-2}+\frac{M}{r^2}\left(1-\frac{r_{\mathrm{H}}}{r}\right)=0,$$

which, through a binomial expansion to leading order in $r_{\mathrm{H}}/r$, can be written as

$$\frac{m}{r^2_{\mathrm{H}}}-\frac{M}{r^2}\left(1+2\frac{r_{\mathrm{H}}}{r}\right)+\frac{M}{r^2}\left(1-\frac{r_{\mathrm{H}}}{r}\right) = \frac{m}{r^2_{\mathrm{H}}}-\frac{M}{r^2}\left(3\frac{r_{\mathrm{H}}}{r}\right)\approx 0.$$

Hence, the relation stated above

$$\frac{r_{\mathrm{H}}}{r}\approx \sqrt[3]{\frac{m}{3 M}}.$$

If the orbit of the secondary about the primary is elliptical, the Hill radius is maximum at the apocenter, where $r$ is largest, and minimum at the pericenter of the orbit. Therefore, for purposes of stability of test particles (for example, of small satellites), the Hill radius at the pericenter distance needs to be considered.

To leading order in $r_{\mathrm{H}}/r$, the Hill radius above also represents the distance of the Lagrangian point L_{1} from the secondary.

== Regions of stability ==
The Hill sphere is only an approximation, and other forces such as radiation pressure or the Yarkovsky effect can eventually perturb an object out of the sphere. As stated, the satellite (third mass) should be small enough that its gravity contributes negligibly.

At large distances from a primary body, retrograde orbits remain stable over a wider region than prograde orbits. This was thought to explain the preponderance of retrograde moons around Jupiter; however, Saturn has a more even mix of retrograde/prograde moons so the reasons are more complicated. In a two-planet system, the mutual Hill radius of the two planets must exceed $2\sqrt{3}$ to be stable. For systems with three or more planets, configurations in which neighbouring planets are separated by fewer than ten mutual Hill radii are inherently unstable, mainly because a third planet introduces perturbations that drain angular momentum.

== Further examples ==
It is possible for a Hill sphere to be so small that it is impossible to maintain an orbit around a body. For example, an astronaut could not have orbited the 104 ton Space Shuttle at an orbit 300 km above the Earth, because a 104-ton object at that altitude has a Hill sphere of only 120 cm in radius, much smaller than a Space Shuttle. A sphere of this size and mass would be denser than lead, and indeed, in low Earth orbit, a spherical body must be denser than lead in order to fit inside its own Hill sphere, or else it will be incapable of supporting an orbit. Satellites further out in geostationary orbit, however, would only need to be more than 6% of the density of water to fit inside their own Hill sphere.

Within the Solar System, the planet with the largest Hill radius is Neptune, with 116 million km, or 0.775 au; its great distance from the Sun amply compensates for its small mass relative to Jupiter (whose own Hill radius measures 53 million km). If Planet Nine exists, however, then assuming a mass of ~10 Earths, radius of ~15,000 km, distance of ~500 AU and eccentricity of ~0.25, it would have a Hill radius of 1.2 billion km, over 10 times Neptune's Hill radius. An asteroid from the asteroid belt will have a Hill sphere that can reach 220,000 km (for 1 Ceres), diminishing rapidly with decreasing mass. The Hill sphere of 66391 Moshup, a Mercury-crossing asteroid that has a moon (named Squannit), measures 22 km in radius.

A typical extrasolar "hot Jupiter", HD 209458 b, has a Hill sphere radius of 593,000 km, about eight times its physical radius of approx 71,000 km. Even the smallest close-in extrasolar planet, CoRoT-7b, still has a Hill sphere radius (61,000 km), six times its physical radius (approx 10,000 km). Therefore, these planets could have small moons close in, although not within their respective Roche limits.

== Hill spheres for the Solar System ==
The following table and logarithmic plot show the radius of the Hill spheres of some bodies of the Solar System calculated with the first formula stated above (including orbital eccentricity), using values obtained from the JPL DE405 ephemeris and from the NASA Solar System Exploration website.

Radius of the Hill spheres of some bodies of the Solar System
Body	Million km	au	Body radii	Arcminutes (Note: At average distance, as seen from the Sun. The angular size as seen from Earth varies depending on Earth's proximity to the object.)	Farthest moon (au)	Ratio of farthest moon to Hill sphere radius
Mercury	0.1753	0.0012	71.9	10.7	—N/a	—N/a
Venus	1.0042	0.0067	165.9	31.8	—N/a	—N/a
Earth	1.4714	0.0098	230.7	33.7	0.00257	0.262
Mars	0.9827	0.0066	289.3	14.9	0.00016	0.0242
Jupiter	50.5736	0.3381	707.4	223.2	0.1662	0.491
Saturn	61.6340	0.4120	1022.7	147.8	0.1785	0.433
Uranus	66.7831	0.4464	2613.1	80.0	0.1366	0.306
Neptune	115.0307	0.7689	4644.6	87.9	0.3360	0.437
Ceres	0.2048	0.0014	433.0	1.7	—N/a	—N/a
Pluto	5.9921	0.0401	5048.1	3.5	0.00043	0.0107
Haumea	9.9186	0.0663	12155.1	5.3	0.00033	0.0049
Makemake	4.8217	0.0322	6743.7	2.4	0.00014	0.0046
Eris	8.1176	0.0543	6979.9	2.7	0.00025	0.0046
Sedna	14.3491	0.0959	~15943,8	0.7	?	?
Planet Nine (hypothetical)	1209.0621	8.082	~80604.1	55.6	?	?

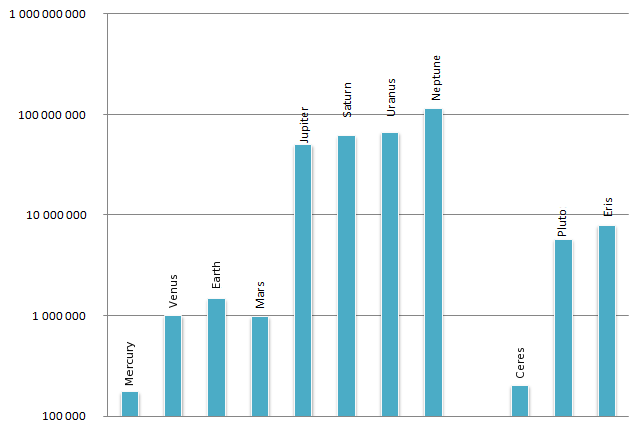
Logarithmic plot of the Hill radii (in km) for the bodies of the Solar System

== See also ==
- Laplace sphere – Region in space where a satellite orbit is stable
- Interplanetary Transport Network – Low-energy trajectories in the Solar System
- n-body problem – Problem in physics and celestial mechanics
- Roche lobe – Gravitationally-binding region around a star in a binary system
- Sphere of influence (astrodynamics) – Region of space gravitationally dominated by a given body
- Sphere of influence (black hole) – Region where a supermassive black hole gravitationally dominates its galaxy
