= Outline of Neptune =

Overview of and topical guide to Neptune

The following outline is provided as an overview of and topical guide to Neptune:

Neptune – eighth and farthest known planet from the Sun in the Solar System. In the Solar System, it is the fourth-largest planet by diameter, the third-most-massive planet, and the densest giant planet. Neptune is 17 times the mass of Earth and is slightly more massive than its near-twin Uranus, which is 15 times the mass of Earth and slightly larger than Neptune. (Note: Neptune is denser and physically smaller than Uranus because Neptune's greater mass gravitationally compresses the atmosphere more.) Neptune orbits the Sun once every 164.8 years at an average distance of 30.1 astronomical units (4.50×10^{9} km). It is named after the Roman god of the sea and has the astronomical symbol ♆, a stylised version of the god Neptune's trident.

== Classification of Neptune ==
- Astronomical object
  - Gravitationally rounded object
    - Planet
      - Giant planet
        - Ice giant
      - Planet of the Solar System
        - Outer planet
        - Superior planet

== Location of Neptune ==
- Milky Way Galaxy – barred spiral galaxy
  - Orion Arm – a spiral arm of the Milky Way
    - Solar System – the Sun and the objects that orbit it, including 8 planets, the eighth and furthest planet from the Sun being Neptune
      - Orbit of Neptune

== Movement of Neptune ==
- Orbit of Neptune
- Rotation of Neptune

== Features of Neptune ==
- Atmosphere of Neptune
- Rings of Neptune

== Natural satellites of Neptune ==
- Moons of Neptune

=== Inner moons of Neptune ===
- Naiad
- Thalassa
- Despina
- Galatea
- Larissa
- Hippocamp
- Proteus

=== Retrograde moons of Neptune ===
- Triton
  - Atmosphere of Triton
  - Climate of Triton
  - Geology of Triton
  - List of geological features on Triton
- Halimede
- Psamathe
- Neso
- S/2021 N 1

=== Prograde moons of Neptune ===
- Nereid
- Sao
- Laomedeia
- S/2002 N 5

== History of Neptune ==
History of Neptune

- Discovery of Neptune

=== Exploration of Neptune ===
Exploration of Neptune

==== Flyby missions to explore Neptune ====
- Voyager 2

== Future of Neptune exploration ==
=== Proposed missions to explore Neptune ===
- Interstellar Express
- Neptune Orbiter
- ODINUS
- Trident

== See also ==
- Outline of astronomy
  - Outline of the Solar System
- Outline of space exploration
