= Halimede =

Halimede can refer to:

- Halimede, one of the Nereids from Greek mythology
- Halimede (moon), one of the outer moons of Neptune
- Halimede (crab), a genus of crab
