= Harold Reitsema =

American astronomer (born 1948)

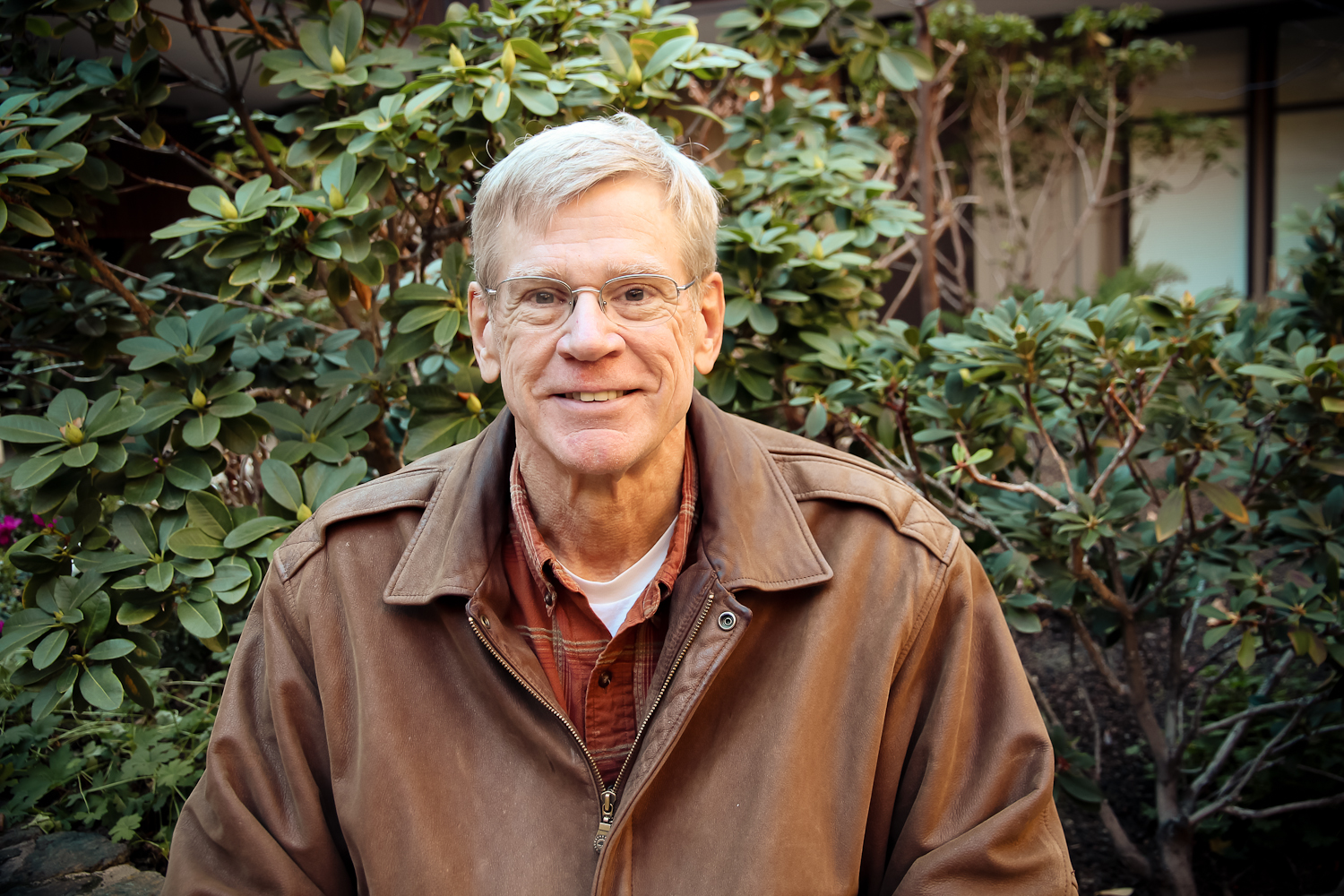
- Born: January 19, 1948 (age 78); Kalamazoo, Michigan, US
- Education: Calvin College; New Mexico State University
- Scientific career
- Fields: Astronomy, Planetary Science, Systems Engineering
- Workplaces: University of Arizona; Ball Aerospace; B612 Foundation
- Doctoral advisor: Reta Beebe

Harold James Reitsema (born January 19, 1948) is an American astronomer who was part of the teams that discovered Larissa, the fifth of Neptune's known moons, and Telesto, Saturn's thirteenth moon. Reitsema and his colleaguez discovered the moons through ground-based telescopic observations. Using a coronagraphic imaging system with one of the first charge-coupled devices available for astronomical use, they first observed Telesto on April 8, 1980, just two months after being one of the first groups to observe Janus, also a moon of Saturn. Reitsema, as part of a different team of astronomers, observed Larissa on May 24, 1981, by watching the occultation of a star by the Neptune system.

Reitsema is also responsible for several advances in the use of false-color techniques as applied to astronomical images. He was a member of the Halley Multicolour Camera team on the ESA Giotto spacecraft that took close-up images of Comet Halley in 1986.

Reitsema received a B.A. in physics from Calvin College in Grand Rapids, Michigan in 1972 and a Ph.D. in astronomy from New Mexico State University in 1977. His dissertation was titled "Quantitative Spectral Classification of Solar-Type Stars and the Sun" with advisor Reta Beebe. He has been involved in many of NASA's space science missions including the Spitzer Space Telescope, Submillimeter Wave Astronomy Satellite, the New Horizons mission to Pluto and the Kepler Space Observatory project searching for Earth-like planets orbiting distant stars similar to the Sun.

Reitsema participated in the ground-based observations of Deep Impact mission in 2005. He observed the impact on the Tempel 1 comet from the telescopes of the San Pedro Martir Observatory (Mexico) with Kevin Walsh (U. Maryland), Ashley Zauderer (U. Maryland), and Roberto Vazquez (UNAM).

Reitsema retired in 2008 from Ball Aerospace & Technologies Corp. in Boulder, Colorado. He is a consultant to NASA and the aerospace industry in mission design and Near-Earth Objects. He is the Mission Director for the B612 Foundation's Sentinel program that will find Near Earth Asteroids and identify potential Earth impact threats. He is listed in Who's Who in America. Asteroid 13327 Reitsema was named in recognition of his achievements. The official naming citation was published by the Minor Planet Center on 24 July 2002 (M.P.C. 46110).
