= 1162 Larissa =

Hildian asteroid

Discovery
- Discovered by: K. Reinmuth
- Discovery site: Heidelberg Obs.
- Discovery date: 5 January 1930

Designations
- Pronunciation: /ləˈrɪsə/
- Named after: Larissa (Greek city)
- Alternative designations: 1930 AC · 1948 KJ
- Minor planet category: main-belt · (outer); Hilda

Orbital characteristics
- Epoch 4 September 2017 (JD 2458000.5)
- Uncertainty parameter 0
- Observation arc: 87.50 yr (31,958 days)
- Aphelion: 4.3705 AU
- Perihelion: 3.5082 AU
- Semi-major axis: 3.9393 AU
- Eccentricity: 0.1095
- Orbital period (sidereal): 7.82 yr (2,856 days)
- Mean anomaly: 315.27°
- Mean motion: 0° 7^{m} 33.96^{s} / day
- Inclination: 1.8856°
- Longitude of ascending node: 39.808°
- Argument of perihelion: 209.55°
- Jupiter MOID: 0.6683 AU

Physical characteristics
- Dimensions: 41.3±0.9 km 42.243±0.111 km 44.32 km (derived); 48.59±1.50 km
- Synodic rotation period: 6.514±0.003 h (Note: Lightcurve plot of (1162) Larissa, by Stephens and Warner (2017), Center for Solar System Studies (CS3)); 6.516±0.002 h 6.520±0.0021 h 13.0 h (dated)
- Geometric albedo: 0.1153 (derived); 0.127±0.009; 0.169±0.012; 0.18±0.03
- Spectral type: Tholen = P · M B–V = 0.761; U–B = 0.226
- Absolute magnitude (H): 9.314±0.001 (R) · 9.40 · 9.42±0.43 · 9.44 · 9.73

1162 Larissa, provisional designation 1930 AC, is a metallic Hildian asteroid from the outermost regions of the asteroid belt, approximately 43 kilometers in diameter. It was discovered on 5 January 1930, by German astronomer Karl Reinmuth at Heidelberg Observatory in southwest Germany. The asteroid was named after the Greek city of Larissa.

== Orbit and classification ==
Larissa belongs to the Hilda group located outermost part of the main-belt. Asteroids in this dynamical group have semi-major axis between 3.7 and 4.2 AU and stay in a 3:2 resonance with the gas giant Jupiter. Larissa, however, is a background asteroid and not a member of the (collisional) Hilda family (101).

The asteroid orbits the Sun at a distance of 3.5–4.4 AU once every 7 years and 10 months (2,856 days). Its orbit has an eccentricity of 0.11 and an inclination of 2° with respect to the ecliptic. The body's observation arc begins 15 days after its official discovery observation at Heidelberg.

== Physical characteristics ==
Larissa has been characterized as a metallic M-type asteroid by the Wide-field Infrared Survey Explorer (WISE). In the Tholen classification, the asteroid a primitive P-type asteroid, which typically have lower albedos than those measured by WISE and Akari (see below).

=== Rotation period ===
In April 2017, a rotational lightcurve of Larissa was obtained from photometric observations by American astronomers Brian Warner and Robert Stephens at the Center for Solar System Studies (U81/U82) in California. Lightcurve analysis gave a well-defined rotation period of 6.514 hours with a brightness variation of 0.12 magnitude (U=3).

In May 2010, a lightcurve form the Oakley Southern Sky Observatory (E09) in Australia, gave a concurring period of 6.516 hours with an amplitude of 0.20 magnitude (U=3). Another period of 6.520 hours (Δ0.12 mag) was measured at the Palomar Transient Factory in October 2012 (U=2). The first photometric observation of Larissa, which gave a period of 13.0 hours, is now considered incorrect (U=1).

=== Diameter and albedo ===
According to the surveys carried out by the Japanese Akari satellite and the NEOWISE mission of NASA's WISE telescope, Larissa measures between 41.3 and 48.59 kilometers in diameter and its surface has an albedo between 0.127 and 0.18. The Collaborative Asteroid Lightcurve Link derives an albedo of 0.1153 and a diameter of 44.32 kilometers based on an absolute magnitude of 9.73.

== Naming ==
This minor planet was named for the city of Larissa, capital of the Thessaly region in Greece, after which the asteroid 1161 Thessalia was named. The name was also given to Larissa (Neptune VII), one of the moons of Neptune. The official naming citation was mentioned in The Names of the Minor Planets by Paul Herget in 1955 (H 108).
