= Sao (moon) =

Irregular moon of Neptune

- Sao imaged by the Very Large Telescope on 3 September 2002

Discovery (Note: This is the exact order of discoverers listed by NASA, the International Astronomical Union, and the United States Geological Survey.)
- Discovered by: Tommy Grav; Matthew J. Holman; JJ Kavelaars; Wesley C. Fraser; Dan Milisavljevic
- Discovery site: Cerro Tololo Obs.
- Discovery date: 14 August 2002

Designations
- Designation: Neptune XI
- Pronunciation: /ˈseɪ.oʊ/
- Named after: Σαώ (Saô)
- Alternative names: S/2002 N 2
- Adjectives: Saonian /seɪˈoʊniən/

Orbital characteristics (range) (Note: Sheppard et al. (2024) give the mean, minimum, and maximum values for Sao's osculating orbital elements in Table 6: semi-major axis 22239900+128200 −116900 km, eccentricity 0.30+0.33 −0.23, inclination 50°+5° −11° with respect to the ecliptic, and orbital period 2917+25 −23. The error bars represent the difference between the minimum/maximum value and the average value over a 10,000-year period.)
- Observation arc: 20.13 years (7,352 d)
- Earliest precovery date: 23 July 2001
- Semi-major axis: 22,123,000 to 22,368,100 km (0.147883 to 0.149522 AU)
- Eccentricity: 0.07 to 0.63
- Orbital period (sidereal): 7.92 to 8.05 years (2,894 to 2,942 d)
- Inclination: 39° to 55° (to ecliptic)
- Satellite of: Neptune
- Group: Sao group

Proper orbital elements (average)
- Proper semi-major axis: 22,239,900 km (0.148665 AU)
- Proper eccentricity: 0.296
- Proper inclination: 50.2° (to ecliptic)
- Proper orbital period: 7.99 years (2,919 d)
- Precession of asc. node: 290.974405 arcsec / yr

Physical characteristics
- Mean diameter: 31 to 44 km (Note: The 31 km diameter estimate comes from Holman et al. (2004) who assume a geometric albedo of 0.06, while the 44 km diameter estimate comes from Sheppard et al. (2006) who assume a geometric albedo of 0.04.)
- Apparent magnitude: 25.4 (R-band)
- Absolute magnitude (H): 10.97

Sao (/ˈseɪ.oʊ/), also known as Neptune XI and previously as S/2002 N 2, is an irregular moon of Neptune. It was discovered on 14 August 2002 by Tommy Grav, Matthew Holman, JJ Kavelaars, Wesley Fraser, and Dan Milisavljevic at Cerro Tololo Inter-American Observatory in Chile. Named after one of the Nereids from Greek mythology, Sao follows a distant, highly eccentric, and highly inclined orbit around Neptune with an average orbital period of about 8 Earth years. Its orbit is prograde, meaning it revolves around Neptune in the same direction as the planet's orbit around the Sun.

Due to Sao's great distance from Neptune, its orbit is significantly influenced by the Sun's gravity. As a result, the moon experiences the Kozai resonance, which causes large, synchronized variations in its orbital eccentricity and inclination over a 3,000-year period. Sao shares similar orbital characteristics with two other Neptunian irregular moons, Laomedeia and S/2002 N 5, which suggests they originated from the collisional breakup of a once-larger moon of Neptune. Sao is estimated to have a diameter between 31 and 44 km (19 and 27 mi), though most of its physical properties are unknown.

== Discovery ==
Sao was discovered by astronomers Tommy Grav, Matthew Holman, JJ Kavelaars, Wesley Fraser, and Dan Milisavljevic during a search for distant moons of Neptune. Led by Holman, the search began in 2001 and employed large optical telescopes on Earth to obtain numerous long-exposure images of the sky around Neptune. The team used the shift-and-add technique to align and combine the images according to Neptune's motion across the sky, which enhanced the faint moons as points of light. Through this technique, they discovered Sao alongside two other Neptunian moons—Halimede and Neso—in images taken on 14 August 2002 by the 4-meter Víctor M. Blanco Telescope at Cerro Tololo Inter-American Observatory, Chile. Sao was among the first Neptunian moons discovered from a ground-based telescope since Nereid in 1949.

To determine Sao's orbit around Neptune, astronomers conducted follow-up observations at several observatories, with the help of orbit predictions by Brian G. Marsden and Robert A. Jacobson. A team led by Brett Gladman observed Sao on 3 and 5 September 2002 with the 8.2-m Very Large Telescope at Cerro Paranal Observatory, while other teams observed it with the 2.5-m Nordic Optical Telescope at La Palma Observatory and the 5-m Hale Telescope at Palomar Observatory. Earlier observations of Sao were found by Holman in Canada–France–Hawaii Telescope images from 23 July 2001. The discovery of Sao, alongside the Neptunian moons Halimede and Laomedeia, was announced by the Minor Planet Center on 13 January 2003. The announcement raised Neptune's number of known moons to 11.

== Name ==
When the discovery of Sao was announced, it was given the temporary provisional designation "S/2002 N 2" by the Minor Planet Center. It was later named and given the Roman numeral designation Neptune XI by the International Astronomical Union's (IAU's) Working Group for Planetary System Nomenclature on 3 February 2007. In accordance with the IAU's naming convention for Neptunian irregular moons, it was named after Sao (Σαώ), one of the fifty Nereids or daughters of Nereus and Doris from Greek mythology. (Note: According to Nicholson et al. (2008), Neptunian irregular moons with prograde and retrograde orbits are generally given names ending with "a" or "e", respectively, while those with unusually high orbital inclinations are given names ending with "o". However, the International Astronomical Union does not state this naming scheme on its website. At the time of its naming, Sao had the highest average inclination out of Neptune's known prograde moons, although the later discovery of S/2002 N 5 in 2024 has shown that Sao's inclination is not unique. The only two Neptunian irregular moons with names ending with "o", Sao and Neso, are both in Kozai resonance unlike the rest of the named Neptunian irregular moons.)

== Orbit ==
Sao is an irregular moon of Neptune, meaning it follows a distant, highly eccentric, and highly inclined orbit around the planet. (Note: Neptune's moons Triton and Nereid are sometimes considered irregular moons, though researchers often discuss them separately due to their unusual orbital characteristics and disproportionately large sizes.) Sao's orbit is prograde, meaning it revolves around Neptune in the same direction as the planet's orbit around the Sun. Due to its great distance from Neptune, the moon is strongly affected by the Sun's gravity, which causes substantial long-term variations in its orbit. For this reason, Sao's orbit is better described by proper orbital elements, which are calculated by averaging out its perturbed orbit over an extended period of time.

Over a 10,000-year time span, Sao's semi-major axis from Neptune varies from 22.1 to 22.4 million km (13.7 to 13.9 million mi; 0.148 to 0.150 AU), averaging about 22.2 million km (13.8 million mi; 0.148 AU). On average, Sao takes about 7.99 years (2,919 days) to complete one orbit around Neptune, though perturbations by the Sun can vary the orbital period from 7.92 to 8.05 years (2,894 to 2,942 days). While Sao's orbit has an average eccentricity of 0.30 and an average inclination of 50° with respect to the ecliptic, both values vary substantially due to the Sun's perturbations. The moon's eccentricity ranges from 0.07 to 0.63, while its inclination ranges from 39° to 55°. Among Neptune's known prograde moons, Sao has the highest average inclination.

Because of its varying eccentricity, Sao can occasionally pass close to Nereid, one of Neptune's largest irregular moons. Over a period of 4.5 billion years, these close encounters could result in gravitational scattering, or even a 1.6% chance of collision. A 2022 study led by Jet Propulsion Laboratory astrophysicists Marina Brozović and Robert A. Jacobson found that Sao and Laomedeia can approach within 320,000 km (200,000 mi) of each other during a 30,000-year time span.

The orbit of Sao (blue) and other irregular moons of Neptune (gray), as seen from three different views. These moons orbit far beyond Triton and Nereid, Neptune's largest moons (colored magenta).

=== Kozai resonance ===
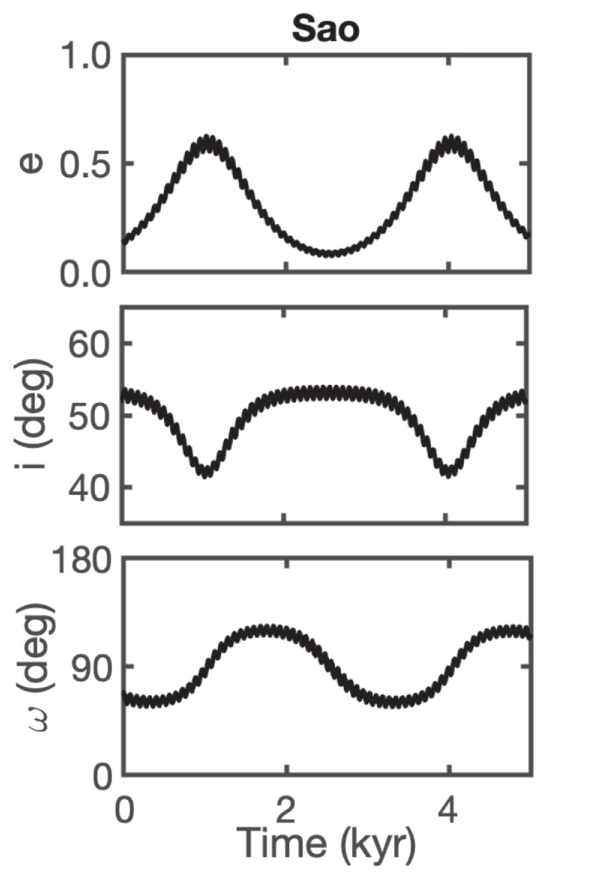
Plots showing periodic oscillations in Sao's eccentricity (e), inclination (i), and argument of pericenter (ω) over 5,000 years. Due to the Kozai resonance, these quantities oscillate with the same period.

Sao's high inclination places it in the Kozai resonance, a dynamical phenomenon in which perturbations from the Sun cause periodic exchanges between orbital eccentricity and inclination. First recognized by Holman and colleagues in 2004, the Kozai resonance causes Sao's eccentricity and inclination to oscillate out of phase over a period of about 3,000 years, (Note: Although Brozović and Jacobson (2022) do not explicitly give the oscillation period for Sao's eccentricity and inclination, they do mention that they are correlated with the moon's argument of pericenter libration, which has a period of ~3,000 years. This can be seen in Figure 5 of their paper.) with eccentricity reaching maximum at minimum inclination and vice versa. While Sao's orbit exhibits nodal precession with a period of 4,454 years, the Kozai resonance prevents it from apsidally precessing. Instead of circulating from 0° to 360°, Sao's argument of pericenter librates around 90° with a period of about 3,000 years. Sao is the only known prograde irregular moon of Neptune that is in the Kozai resonance.

=== Group and origin ===
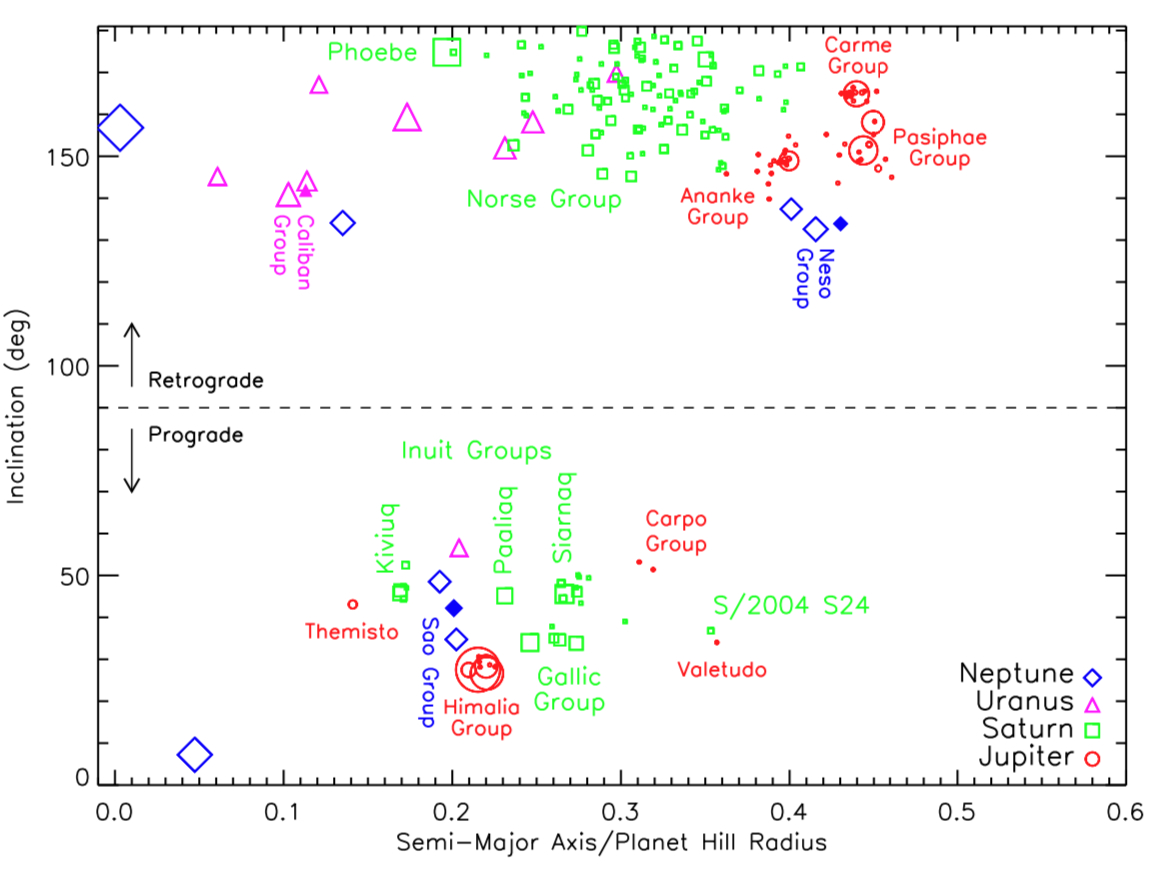
Irregular moons of all four giant planets, plotted by average distance from their planet (semi-major axis in Hill radii) and orbital inclination (degrees with respect to ecliptic). The Sao group is the cluster of prograde moons labeled in blue.

Sao shares similar orbital characteristics with two other Neptunian irregular moons, Laomedeia and S/2002 N 5. Together, they form the Sao group, a family of prograde irregular moons of which Sao is the largest member. The Sao group was first suspected by astronomers in 2004 based on the similar orbits of Sao and Laomedeia, but it was not confirmed until the discovery of S/2002 N 5 as a third member in 2024. (Note: S/2002 N 5 was discovered in 2002, but its orbit was not determined and published until 2024.) The group is predicted to contain many more smaller members, though they are too faint to be detected with current technology.

Because of their similar orbits, the moons of the Sao group have low mutual dispersion velocities between 100 and 200 m/s. The dispersion velocity is the speed needed to eject a fragment from a parent body onto its current orbit. For fragments produced in collisions, their dispersion velocities are typically below 100 m/s, comparable to the parent body's escape velocity. The minimum dispersion velocities of the Sao group are low enough to suggest that it originated from a collision, meaning it may be a collisional family. The Sao group is believed to have originated from the destruction of a once-larger irregular moon by a collision with a passing asteroid or comet. This former moon was likely gravitationally captured by Neptune during the Solar System's early history, during or shortly after the formation of the planets.

If the Sao group is a collisional family, then its members are expected to are expected to share similar surface characteristics, such as color. Compared to other collisional families, the Sao group is unusual in that two of its largest members—Sao and Laomedeia—have similar brightness and estimated sizes.

== Physical characteristics ==
Little is known about Sao's physical characteristics. Like most of Neptune's irregular moons, Sao is extremely faint and difficult to observe due to its small size and great distance from the Sun. In red light (R band), Sao has an apparent magnitude of 25.4, making it about 100 million times fainter than what can be seen with the naked eye. Because of this, Sao and most of Neptune's irregular moons can only be observed through long-exposure imaging with large optical telescopes.

The diameter of Sao has not been directly measured, although it can be indirectly estimated from its brightness and an assumed geometric albedo. Assuming a geometric albedo of 0.04, Sao's diameter would be about 44 km (27 mi). For a higher albedo of 0.06, Sao would have a diameter of 31 km (19 mi). Sao appears to be roughly the same size as Laomedeia, if both moons have the same albedo.

== See also ==
- Other Neptunian irregular moons discovered in 2002:
  - Halimede
  - Laomedeia
  - Neso
  - S/2002 N 5 (lost in 2002, confirmed much later in 2024)
