= Moons of Neptune =

Natural satellites of the planet Neptune

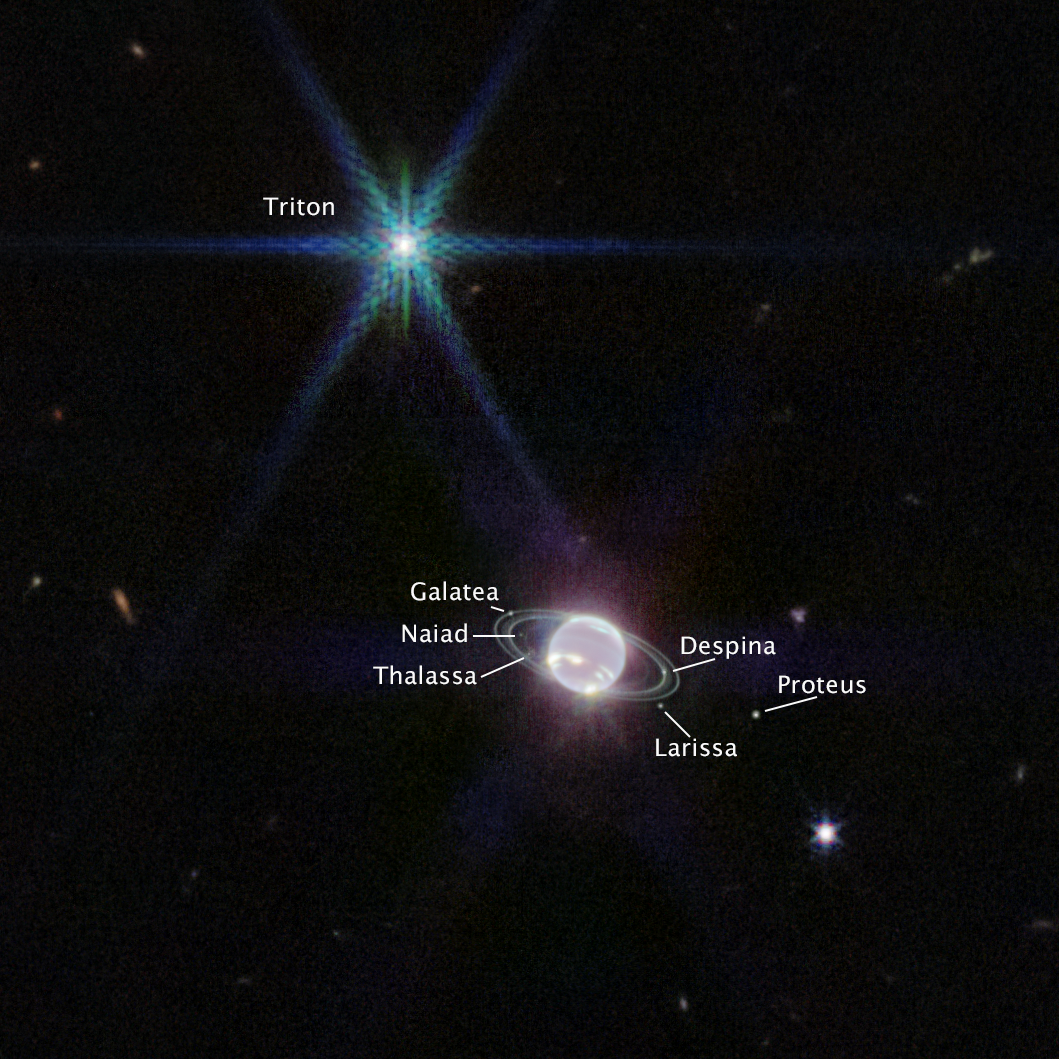
An annotated near-infrared image of some of Neptune's moons as captured by the James Webb Space Telescope in September 2022. (Note: The bright blue diffraction star is Triton, Neptune's largest moon; while Hippocamp, its smallest known regular moon, is too small to be seen.)

There are 16 known moons of the planet Neptune, fourteen of which are named after water deities and creatures in Greek mythology. (Note: This is an IAU guideline that will be followed at the naming of every Neptunian moon, although two (S/2002 N 5 and S/2021 N 1) have yet to receive permanent names.) The largest is Triton, discovered by William Lassell on 10 October 1846, 17 days after the discovery of Neptune itself. Over a century passed before the discovery of the second natural satellite, Nereid, in 1949, and another 40 years before Proteus, Neptune's second-largest moon, was discovered in 1989.

Triton is unique among moons of planetary mass in that its orbit is retrograde to Neptune's rotation and inclined relative to Neptune's equator, which suggests that it did not form in orbit around Neptune, but was instead gravitationally captured by it. The next-largest satellite in the Solar System suspected to be captured, Saturn's moon Phoebe, has only 0.03% of Triton's mass. The capture of Triton, probably occurring some time after Neptune formed a satellite system, was a catastrophic event for Neptune's original satellites, disrupting their orbits so that they collided to form a rubble disc. Triton is massive enough to have achieved hydrostatic equilibrium and to retain a thin atmosphere capable of forming clouds and hazes.

Inward of Triton are seven small inner moons, Neptune's only regular satellites, all with prograde orbits close to the planet's equatorial plane; some orbit among Neptune's rings. Including the largest, Proteus, they were re-accreted from the rubble disc formed after Triton's orbit became circular. Beyond Triton, Neptune has eight outer irregular satellites: four retrograde and four prograde. Among the prograde satellites is Nereid, the largest of the eight outer moons, which orbits much farther from Neptune at a high inclination. Its orbit is unusually close and highly eccentric for an irregular satellite, suggesting it may once have been a regular satellite significantly perturbed when Triton was captured. The outermost moons of Neptune are the furthest moons from their primaries in the Solar System.

== History ==
=== Discovery ===
Triton was discovered by William Lassell in 1846, just seventeen days after the discovery of Neptune. Nereid was discovered by Gerard P. Kuiper in 1949. The third moon, later named Larissa, was first observed by Harold J. Reitsema, William B. Hubbard, Larry A. Lebofsky, and David J. Tholen on 24 May 1981. The astronomers were observing a star's close approach to Neptune, looking for rings similar to those discovered around Uranus four years earlier. If rings were present, the star's luminosity would decrease slightly just before the planet's closest approach. The star's luminosity dipped only for several seconds, which meant that it was due to a moon rather than rings.

No further moons were found until Voyager 2 flew by Neptune in 1989. Voyager 2 recovered Larissa and discovered five inner moons: Naiad, Thalassa, Despina, Galatea and Proteus. In 2002 and 2003, two surveys using large ground-based telescopes found five additional outer irregular moons, bringing the total to thirteen. These moons were Halimede, Sao, Laomedeia, Neso, and Psamathe. A sixth moon was also detected in 2002, but it could not be re-observed enough times to determine its orbit, so it became lost.

In 2013 Mark R. Showalter discovered Hippocamp while examining Hubble Space Telescope images of Neptune's ring arcs from 2009. He used a technique similar to panning to compensate for orbital motion and allow stacking of multiple images to bring out faint details. After deciding on a whim to expand the search area to radii well beyond the rings, he found an unambiguous dot that represented the new moon. He then found it repeatedly in other archival HST images going back to 2004. Voyager 2, which had observed all of Neptune's other inner satellites, did not detect it during its 1989 flyby, due to its dimness.

In 2021, Scott S. Sheppard and colleagues used the Subaru Telescope at Mauna Kea, Hawaii and discovered two more irregular moons of Neptune, which were announced in 2024. These two moons are provisionally designated S/2021 N 1 and S/2002 N 5. The latter turned out to be a recovery of the lost moon from 2002.

=== Names ===
Triton did not have an official name until the twentieth century. Its name, deriving from Greek mythology as a son of Poseidon (the Greek equivalent of Neptune), was suggested by Camille Flammarion in his 1880 book Astronomie Populaire, but it did not come into common use until at least the 1930s. Until this time it was usually simply known as "the satellite of Neptune". Other moons of Neptune are also named for Greek water gods, in keeping with Neptune's position as god of the sea: either from Greek mythology, usually children of Poseidon (Triton, Proteus, Despina, Thalassa); lovers of Poseidon (Larissa); other mythological creatures related to Poseidon (Hippocamp); classes of minor Greek water deities (Naiad, Nereid); or specific Nereids (Halimede, Galatea, Neso, Sao, Laomedeia, Psamathe).

For the "normal" irregular satellites, the general convention is to use names ending in "a" for prograde satellites, names ending in "e" for retrograde satellites, and names ending in "o" for exceptionally inclined satellites, exactly like the convention for the moons of Jupiter. Two asteroids share the same names as moons of Neptune: 74 Galatea and 1162 Larissa.

== Characteristics ==
The moons of Neptune can be divided into two groups: regular and irregular. The first group includes the seven inner moons, which follow circular prograde orbits lying in the equatorial plane of Neptune. The second group consists of all nine other moons including Triton. They generally follow inclined eccentric and often retrograde orbits far from Neptune; the only exception is Triton, which orbits close to the planet following a circular orbit, though retrograde and inclined.

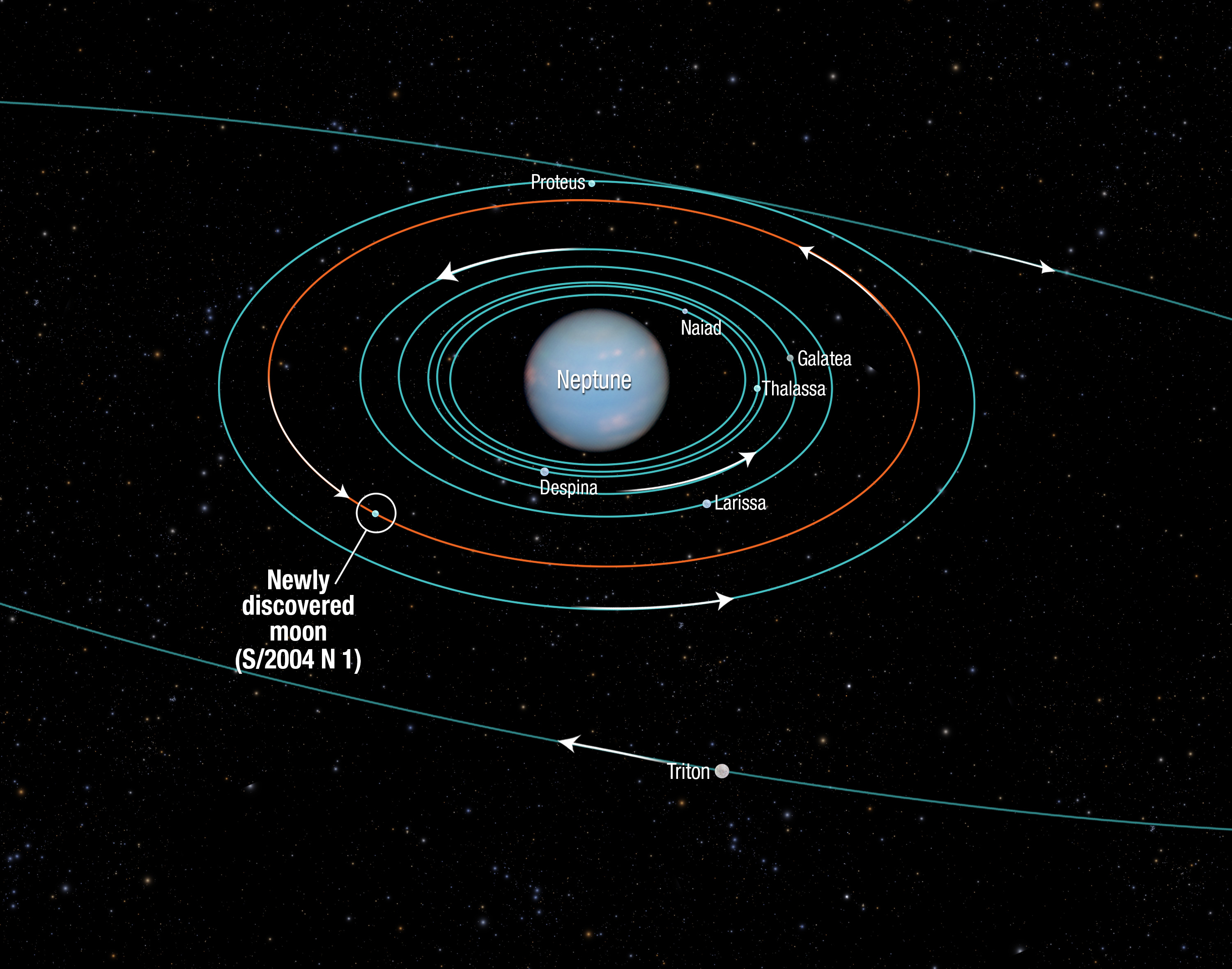
Orbit diagram of Neptune's inner moons, including Triton, with their names and orbit directions indicated

Size comparison of Neptune's seven inner moons

=== Regular moons ===
In order of distance from Neptune, the regular moons are Naiad, Thalassa, Despina, Galatea, Larissa, Hippocamp, and Proteus. All but the outer two are within Neptune-synchronous orbit (Neptune's rotational period is 0.6713 days (16.11 h)) and thus are being tidally decelerated. Naiad, the closest regular moon, is also the second smallest among the inner moons (following the discovery of Hippocamp), whereas Proteus is the largest regular moon and the second largest moon of Neptune. The first five moons orbit much faster than Neptune's rotation itself ranging from 7 hours for Naiad and Thalassa, to 13 hours for Larissa.

The inner moons are closely associated with Neptune's rings. The two innermost satellites, Naiad and Thalassa, orbit between the Galle and LeVerrier rings. Despina may be a shepherd moon of the LeVerrier ring, because its orbit lies just inside this ring. The next moon, Galatea, orbits just inside the most prominent of Neptune's rings, the Adams ring. This ring is very narrow, with a width not exceeding 50 km, and has five embedded bright arcs. The gravity of Galatea helps confine the ring particles within a limited region in the radial direction, maintaining the narrow ring. Various resonances between the ring particles and Galatea may also have a role in maintaining the arcs.

Only the two largest regular moons have been imaged with a resolution sufficient to discern their shapes and surface features. Larissa, about 200 km in diameter, is slightly elongated. Proteus is also not significantly elongated, but not fully spherical either: it resembles an irregular polyhedron, with several flat or slightly concave facets 150 to 250 km in diameter. At about 400 km in diameter, it is larger than the Saturnian moon Mimas, which is fully ellipsoidal. This difference may be due to a past collisional disruption of Proteus. The surface of Proteus is heavily cratered and shows a number of linear features. Its largest crater, Pharos, is more than 150 km in diameter.

All of Neptune's inner moons are dark objects: their geometric albedo ranges from 7 to 10%. Their spectra indicate that they are made from water ice contaminated by some very dark material. In this respect, the inner Neptunian moons are similar to the inner Uranian moons.

=== Irregular moons ===
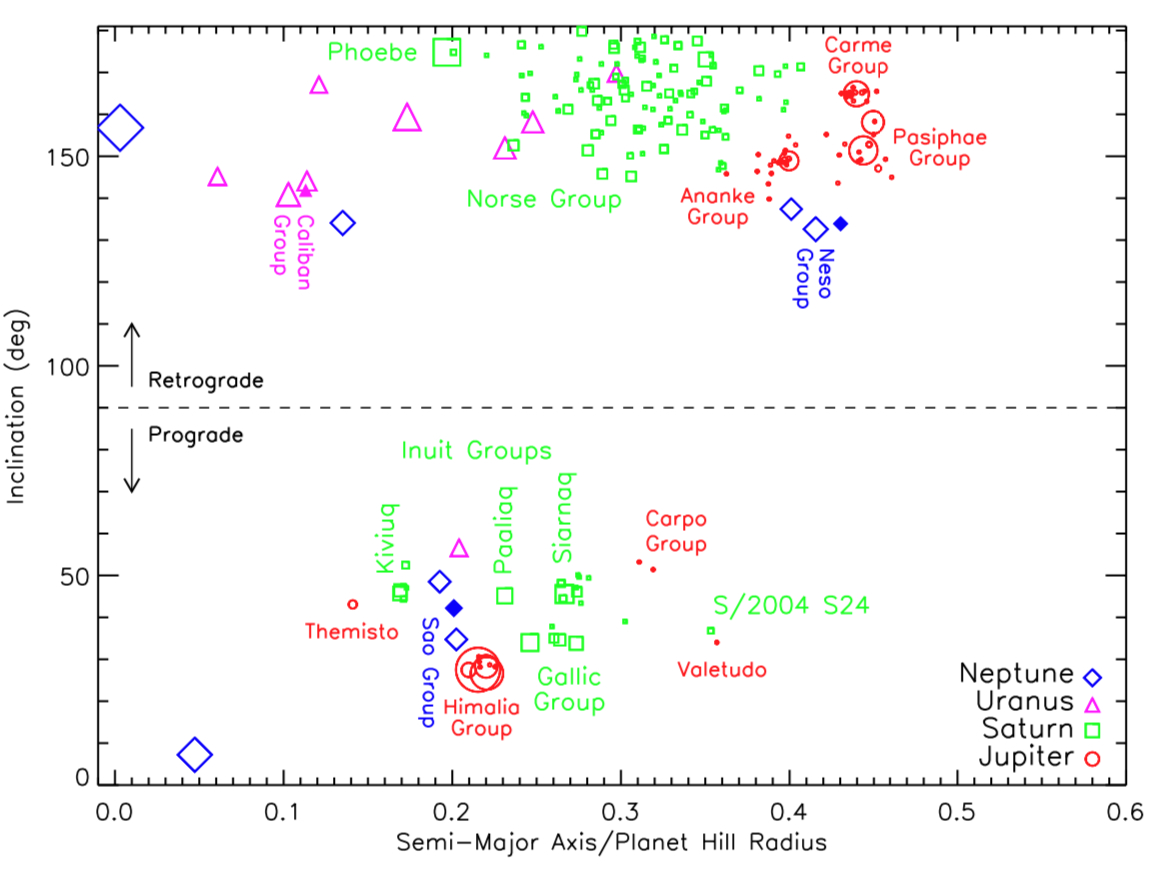
Irregular satellites of all four giant planets, plotted by average distance from their planet (semi-major axis in Hill radii) and orbital inclination (degrees with respect to ecliptic). Irregular moons of Neptune are plotted as blue diamonds. Data as of February 2024.

In order of their distance from the planet, the irregular moons are Triton, Nereid, Halimede, Sao, S/2002 N 5, Laomedeia, Psamathe, Neso, and S/2021 N 1, a group that includes both prograde and retrograde objects. The seven outermost moons are similar to the irregular moons of other giant planets, and are thought to have been gravitationally captured by Neptune, unlike the regular satellites, which probably formed in situ.

Triton and Nereid are unusual irregular satellites and are thus treated separately from the other seven irregular Neptunian moons, which are more like the outer irregular satellites of the other outer planets. Firstly, they are the largest two known irregular moons in the Solar System, with Triton being about eight times larger than Nereid in terms of diameter. Secondly, they both have atypically small semi-major axes, with Triton's being about twelve times smaller than the runner-up (Francisco around Uranus, with the third place being Nereid). Thirdly, they both have unusual orbital eccentricities: Nereid has one of the most eccentric orbits of any known irregular satellite, and Triton's orbit is a nearly perfect circle. Finally, Nereid also has the lowest inclination of any known irregular satellite.

==== Triton ====
Triton follows a retrograde and quasi-circular orbit, and is thought to be a gravitationally captured satellite. It was the second moon in the Solar System that was discovered to have a substantial atmosphere, which is primarily nitrogen with small amounts of methane and carbon monoxide. The pressure on Triton's surface is about 1.4 Pa. In 1989, the Voyager 2 spacecraft observed what appeared to be clouds and hazes in this thin atmosphere. Triton is one of the coldest bodies in the Solar System, with a surface temperature of about 38 K (−235.2 °C). Its surface is covered by nitrogen, methane, carbon dioxide and water ices and has a high geometric albedo of more than 70%. The Bond albedo is even higher, reaching up to 90%. (Note: The geometric albedo of an astronomical body is the ratio of its actual brightness at zero phase angle (i.e. as seen from the light source) to that of an idealized flat, fully reflecting, diffusively scattering (Lambertian) disk with the same cross-section. The Bond albedo, named after the American astronomer George Phillips Bond (1825–1865), who originally proposed it, is the fraction of power in the total electromagnetic radiation incident on an astronomical body that is scattered back out into space. The Bond albedo is a value strictly between 0 and 1, as it includes all possible scattered light (but not radiation from the body itself). This is in contrast to other definitions of albedo such as the geometric albedo, which can be above 1. In general, though, the Bond albedo may be greater or smaller than the geometric albedo, depending on surface and atmospheric properties of the body in question.) Surface features include the large southern polar cap, older cratered planes cross-cut by graben and scarps, as well as youthful features probably formed by endogenic processes like cryovolcanism. Voyager 2 observations revealed a number of active geysers within the polar cap heated by the Sun, which eject plumes up to 8 km high. Triton has a relatively high density of about 2 g/cm^{3}, indicating that rocks constitute about two thirds of its mass, and ices (mainly water ice) the remaining one third. There may be a layer of liquid water deep inside Triton, forming a subsurface ocean. Because of its retrograde orbit and relative proximity to Neptune (closer than the Moon is to Earth), tidal deceleration is causing Triton to spiral inward, which will lead to its destruction in about 28 billion years.

==== Nereid ====
Nereid is the third-largest moon of Neptune. It has a prograde, but very eccentric, orbit and is believed to be a former regular satellite that was scattered to its current orbit through gravitational interactions during Triton's capture. Water ice has been spectroscopically detected on its surface. Early measurements of Nereid showed large, irregular variations in its visible magnitude, which were speculated to be caused by forced precession or chaotic rotation combined with an elongated shape and bright or dark spots on the surface. This was disproved in 2016, when observations from the Kepler space telescope showed only minor variations. Thermal modeling based on infrared observations from the Spitzer and Herschel space telescopes suggest that Nereid is only moderately elongated, which disfavours forced precession of the rotation. The thermal model also indicates that the surface roughness of Nereid is very high, likely similar to the Saturnian moon Hyperion.

Nereid dominates the normal irregular satellites of Neptune, having about 98% of the mass of Neptune's entire irregular satellite system altogether (if Triton is not counted). This is similar to the situation of Phoebe at Saturn. It is also larger by far than all normal irregular satellites, having about two-thirds the mass of all non-Triton irregular moons combined.

Spectroscopic observations conducted by the James Webb Space Telescope have shown that Nereid's spectrum differs significantly from those of minor planets in the outer Solar System. Although many irregular satellites share similarities with Kuiper belt objects, Nereid does not correspond to the observed spectral types of Kuiper belt objects, implying that it likely formed around Neptune instead of being captured. If this interpretation is confirmed, Nereid would represent the only intact original moon of Neptune to have survived Triton's destructive arrival.

==== Normal irregular moons ====
Among the remaining irregular moons, Sao, S/2002 N 5, and Laomedeia follow prograde orbits, whereas Halimede, Psamathe, Neso and S/2021 N 1 follow retrograde orbits. There are at least two groups of moons that share similar orbits, with the prograde moons Sao, S/2002 N 5, and Laomedeia belonging to the Sao group and the retrograde moons Psamathe, Neso, and S/2021 N 1 belonging to the Neso group. The moons of the Neso group have the largest orbits of any natural satellites discovered in the Solar System to date, with average orbital distances over 125 times the distance between Earth and the Moon and orbital periods over 25 years. In particular, Neptune's outermost moon, S/2021 N 1, which has an orbital period of about 27 Earth years, orbits farther from its planet than any other known moon in the Solar System. Neptune has the largest Hill sphere in the Solar System, owing primarily to its large distance from the Sun; this allows it to retain control of such distant moons. Nevertheless, the Jovian moons in the Carme and Pasiphae groups orbit at a greater percentage of their primary's Hill radius than the Neso group moons.

The orbits of Neptune's irregular moons, as seen from three different views. Prograde irregular moons are colored blue, retrograde irregular moons are colored red, and major moons (Triton and Nereid) are colored magenta. Data as of 2026.

== List of moons ==
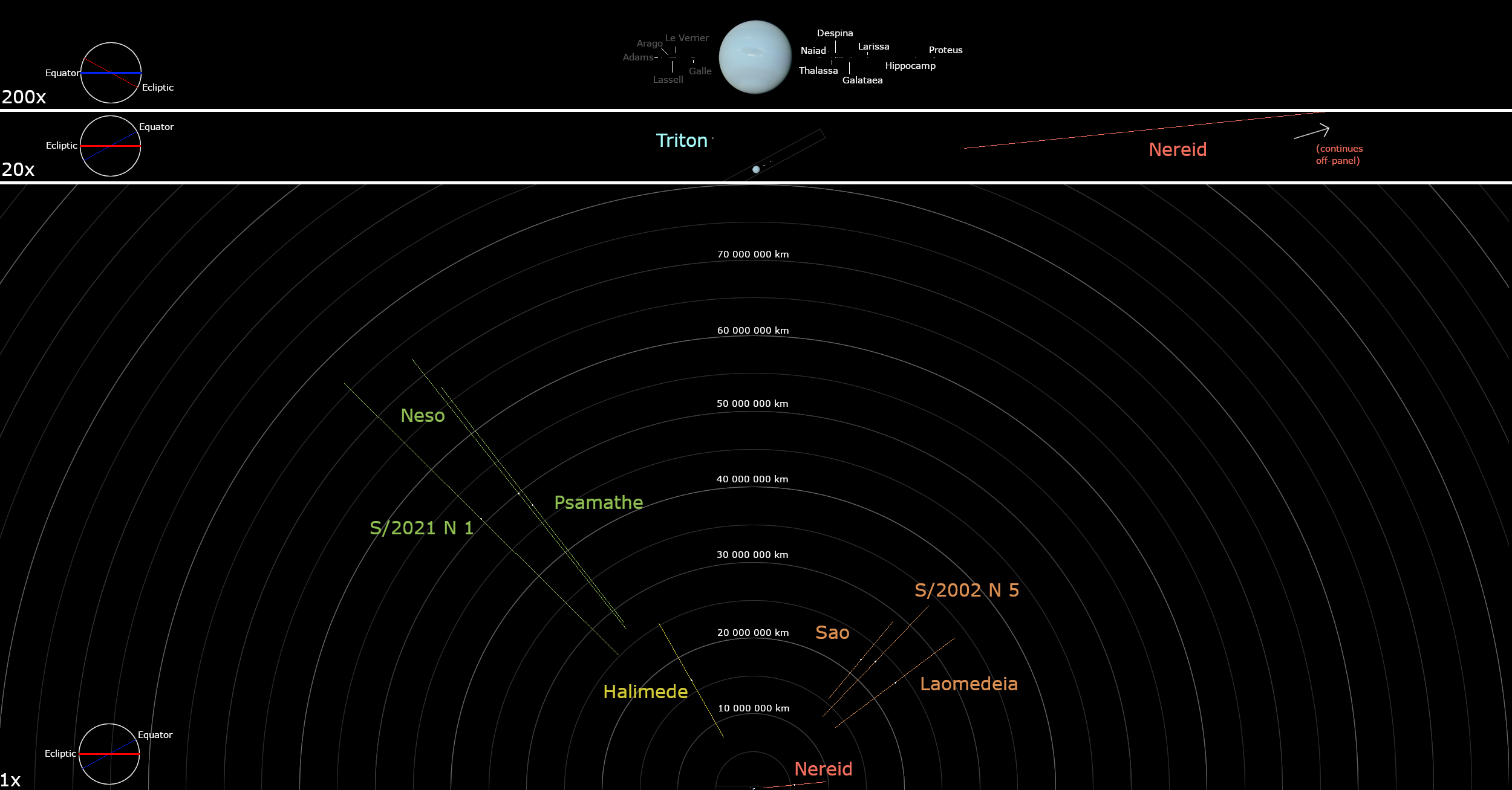
Orbital diagram of the orbital inclination and orbital distances for Neptune's rings and moon system at various scales. Notable moons and rings are individually labeled. Open the image for full resolution.

Neptunian natural satellite system size comparison

The Neptunian moons are listed here by orbital period, from shortest to longest. Irregular (captured) moons are marked by color and symbols, distinguishing the Sao and Neso groups, as well as Triton, Nereid, and Halimede which do not fit in either. The orbits and mean distances of the irregular moons are variable over short timescales due to frequent planetary and solar perturbations; therefore, the listed orbital elements of all irregular moons are averaged over a 30,000-year period: these may differ from osculating orbital elements provided by other sources. The orbital elements of Triton and Nereid are based on the epoch of 1 January 2000, while those of the other moons are all based on the epoch of 1 January 2020. Triton, the only Neptunian moon massive enough for its surface to have collapsed into a spheroid, is emboldened.

Key
Inner moons (7)	♠ Triton (1)	† Nereid (1)
‡ Halimede (1)	♦ Sao group (3)	♥ Neso group (3)
Orbital period: default is prograde, − is retrograde

Neptunian moons
Label (Note: Label refers to the Roman numeral attributed to each moon in order of their discovery.)	Name	Pronunciation	Image	Abs. magn.	Diameter (km) (Note: Diameters with multiple entries such as "60×40×34" reflect that the body is not spherical and that each of its dimensions has been measured well enough to provide a 3-axis estimate. Proteus, despite not being spherical, fits poorly to a triaxial ellipsoid, so its dimensions are not listed here. The size and dimensions of the inner moons except Hippocamp were taken from Karkoschka, 2003. The size of Hippocamp was taken from Sholwalter et al., 2019. Dimensions of Triton are from Thomas, 2000, whereas its diameter is taken from Davies et al., 1991. The size of Nereid is from Kiss et al., 2016, and the sizes of the other outer moons are from Sheppard, with the diameters of S/2002 N 5 and S/2021 N 1 calculated assuming an albedo of 0.04.)	Mass (×10 Eg) (Note: The mass of Triton was estimated by JPL, the masses of Naiad and Thalassa were estimated by Brozović et al. 2020, and the mass of Galatea was taken from Porco 1991. The masses of Despina and Proteus were calculated assuming a spherical volume and a density of 0.6 g/cm^{3} while the masses of all other moons of Neptune were calculated assuming a density of 1 g/cm^{3}.)	Semi-major axis (km) (Note: Orbital elements of the inner moons are from Brozović et al. 2020. Those of Triton and Nereid are from Yuan et al. 2021, and those of the other irregular moons are from JPL.)	Orbital period (±d)	Orbital inclination (°) (Note: Orbital elements of the inner satellites, Triton, and Nereid are with respect to their local Laplace planes. Orbital elements of the other irregular satellites are with respect to the ecliptic. Inclinations greater than 90° are retrograde. Orbital periods of irregular satellites may not be consistent with their semi-major axes due to perturbations.)	Eccentricity	Discovery year	Year announced	Discoverer	Group
III	Naiad	/ˈneɪəd, ˈnaɪæd/	A smeared white object elongated from the bottom-left to top-right can be seen in the center.	9.2	66 ± 6 (96 × 60 × 52)	12	48228	0.2943923	4.728	0.00014	1989	1989	Voyager Science Team	Inner
IV	Thalassa	/θəˈlæsə/	A group of three objects, each circled and labeled by the respective designations. Thalassa is the central object designated 1989 N5.	8.6	82 ± 6 (108 × 100 × 52)	35	50075	0.3114836	0.168	0.00019	1989	1989	Voyager Science Team	Inner
V	Despina	/dəˈspaɪnə/	A white oval shaped object somewhat elongated horizontally is seen in the center. There are a few small dark spots on its surface.	7.3	150 ± 6 (180 × 148 × 128)	≈ 110	52526	0.3346555	0.039	0.00027	1989	1989	Voyager Science Team	Inner
VI	Galatea	/ˌɡæləˈtiːə/	A small white object elongated from the bottom-left to top-right can be seen in the center.	7.1	176 ± 8 (204 × 184 × 144)	212	61953	0.428744	0.010	0.00020	1989	1989	Voyager Science Team	Inner
VII	Larissa	/ləˈrɪsə/	An irregularly shaped grey object slightly elongated horizontally occupies almost the whole image. Its surface shows a number of dark and white spots.	6.8	194 ± 6 (216 × 204 × 168)	≈ 380	73548	0.554653	0.214	0.00121	1981	1981	Reitsema et al.	Inner
XIV	Hippocamp	/ˈhɪpəkæmp/	Composite of multiple Hubble images of the Neptune system, with the moons appearing as bright white dots. The fainter dot to the upper right is Hippocamp, circled and labeled to distinguish it from other moons in this image.	10.5	34.8±4.0	≈ 2.2	105283	0.950104	0.002	0.00001	2013	2013	Showalter et al.	Inner
VIII	Proteus	/ˈproʊtiəs/	A conically shaped object is seen almost fully illuminated from the left. The cone axis looks towards the observer. The outline of the object is a rectangle with rounded corners. The surface is rough with a few large depressions.	5.0	420 ± 14	≈ 2300	117647	1.12231	0.042	0.00047	1989	1989	Voyager Science Team	Inner
I	Triton^{♠}	/ˈtraɪtən/	A large spherical object is half-illuminated from the bottom-left. The south pole faces to the light source. Around it in the bottom-left part of the body there is a large white area with a few dozens dark streaks elongated in the pole to equator direction. This polar cap has a slight red tinge. The equatorial region is darker with a tint of cyan. Its surface is rough with a number of craters and intersecting lineaments.	–1.2	2705.2±4.8 (2709 × 2706 × 2705)	2139000	354758	−5.876854	156.834	0.00001	1846	1846	Lassell	
II	Nereid^{†}	/ˈnɪəriəd/	A small white smeared body is seen in center.	4.4	335–345	≈ 2100	5513782	360.1336	7.108	0.75067	1949	1949	Kuiper	
IX	Halimede^{‡}	/ˌhæləˈmiːdiː/		9.9	≈ 61	≈ 12	16590500	−1879.08	119.6	0.521	2002	2003	Holman et al.	
XI	Sao^{♦}	/ˈseɪoʊ/		11.0	≈ 40	≈ 3.4	22239900	2912.72	50.2	0.296	2002	2003	Holman et al.	Sao
	S/2002 N 5^{♦}			11.2	≈ 38	≈ 2.9	23414700	3156.556	46.3	0.433	2002	2024	Holman et al.	Sao
XII	Laomedeia^{♦}	/ˌleɪəməˈdiːə/		10.8	≈ 40	≈ 3.4	23499900	3171.33	36.9	0.419	2002	2003	Holman et al.	Sao
X	Psamathe^{♥}	/ˈsæməθiː/		10.8	≈ 38	≈ 2.9	47646600	−9149.514	127.8	0.413	2003	2003	Sheppard et al.	Neso
XIII	Neso^{♥}	/ˈniːsoʊ/		10.7	≈ 60	≈ 11	49897800	−9794.705	128.4	0.455	2002	2003	Holman et al.	Neso
	S/2021 N 1^{♥}			12.1	≈ 25	≈ 0.8	50700200	−10036.651	135.2	0.503	2021	2024	Sheppard et al.	Neso

== Formation ==
The mass distribution of the Neptunian moons is the most lopsided of the satellite systems of the giant planets in the Solar System. One moon, Triton, makes up nearly all of the mass of the system, with all other moons together comprising only one third of one percent. This is similar to the moon system of Saturn, where Titan makes up more than 95% of the total mass, but is different from the more balanced systems of Jupiter and Uranus. The reason for the lopsidedness of the present Neptunian system is that Triton was captured well after the formation of Neptune's original satellite system, and experts conjecture much of the system was destroyed in the process of capture.

The relative masses of the Neptunian moons

Triton's orbit upon capture would have been highly eccentric, and would have caused chaotic perturbations in the orbits of the original inner Neptunian satellites, causing them to collide and reduce to a disc of rubble. This means it is likely that Neptune's present inner satellites are not the original bodies that formed with Neptune. Only after Triton's orbit became circularised could some of the rubble re-accrete into the present-day regular moons. These satellites were probably destroyed again by later impacts from comets, and so reformed even more recently than Triton's capture event, with the exception of Proteus which was likely large enough to survive the impacts.

The mechanism of Triton's capture has been the subject of several theories over the years. One of them postulates that Triton was captured in a three-body encounter. In this scenario, Triton is the surviving member of a binary Kuiper belt object (Note: Binary objects, objects with moons such as the Pluto–Charon system, are quite common among the larger trans-Neptunian objects (TNOs). Around 11% of all TNOs may be binaries.) disrupted by its encounter with Neptune.

Numerical simulations show that there is a 41% probability that the moon Halimede collided with Nereid at some time in the past. Although it is not known whether any collision has taken place, both moons appear to have similar ("grey") colors, implying that Halimede could be a fragment of Nereid.

== See also ==
- List of natural satellites
