= Dan Milisavljevic =

Canadian astronomer (born 1980)

Dan Milisavljevic (born January 31, 1980) is a Canadian astronomer and assistant professor of physics and astronomy at Purdue University.

Milisavljevic received his undergraduate education at McMaster University, where he was enrolled in the prestigious McMaster Arts and Science Programme. Upon graduation in 2004, he was awarded the Commonwealth Scholarship to study at the London School of Economics. There he pursued an MSc in the Philosophy and History of Science, and completed a dissertation on the interpretation of quantum mechanics. In June 2011, Milisavljevic obtained a PhD in physics and astronomy from Dartmouth College. Afterwards, he was a postdoctoral fellow at the Center for Astrophysics | Harvard & Smithsonian before joining the faculty at Purdue.

Milisavljevic specializes in observational work in supernovae and supernova remnants. He is also known for aiding in the discovery of Uranus's moons Ferdinand, Trinculo, and Francisco; and Neptune's moons Halimede, Sao, Laomedeia and Neso.
