= Laomedeia =

Irregular moon of Neptune

- Laomedeia imaged by the Very Large Telescope on 3 September 2002

Discovery (Note: This is the exact order of discoverers listed by NASA, the International Astronomical Union, and the United States Geological Survey.)
- Discovered by: Matthew J. Holman; JJ Kavelaars; Tommy Grav; Wesley C. Fraser; Dan Milisavljevic
- Discovery site: Cerro Tololo Obs.
- Discovery date: 13 August 2002

Designations
- Designation: Neptune XII
- Pronunciation: /ˌleɪəməˈdiːə/
- Named after: Λαομέδεια (Laomedeia)
- Alternative names: S/2002 N 3
- Adjectives: Laomedeian

Orbital characteristics (range) (Note: Sheppard et al. (2024) give the mean, minimum, and maximum values for Laomedeia's osculating orbital elements in Table 6: semi-major axis 23,499,900+186,000 −152,000 km, eccentricity 0.42+0.14 −0.13, inclination 37°+7° −7° with respect to the ecliptic, and orbital period 3,168+38 −31. The error bars represent the difference between the minimum/maximum value and the average value over a 10,000-year period.)
- Observation arc: 20.08 years (7,333 d)
- Earliest precovery date: 11 August 2001
- Semi-major axis: 23,347,900 to 23,685,900 km (0.156071 to 0.158330 AU)
- Eccentricity: 0.29 to 0.56
- Orbital period (sidereal): 8.59 to 8.78 years (3,137 to 3,206 d)
- Inclination: 30° to 44° (to ecliptic)
- Satellite of: Neptune
- Group: Sao group

Proper orbital elements (average)
- Proper semi-major axis: 23,499,900 km (0.157087 AU)
- Proper eccentricity: 0.419
- Proper inclination: 36.9° (to ecliptic)
- Proper orbital period: 8.67 years (3,168 d)
- Precession of perihelion long.: 574.722838 arcsec / yr
- Precession of asc. node: 410.906785 arcsec / yr

Physical characteristics
- Mean diameter: 37 to 42 km (Note: The 37-km-diameter estimate comes from Holman et al. (2004) who assume a geometric albedo of 0.06, while the 42-km-diameter estimate comes from Sheppard et al. (2006) who assume a geometric albedo of 0.04.)
- Apparent magnitude: 25.4 (R-band)
- Absolute magnitude (H): 10.77

Laomedeia (/ˌleɪəməˈdiːə/), also known as Neptune XII and previously as S/2002 N 3, is an irregular moon of Neptune. It was discovered on 13 August 2002 by Matthew Holman, JJ Kavelaars, Tommy Grav, Wesley Fraser, and Dan Milisavljevic at Cerro Tololo Inter-American Observatory in Chile. Named after one of the Nereids from Greek mythology, Laomedeia follows a distant, highly eccentric, and highly inclined orbit around Neptune with an average orbital period of about 8.7 Earth years. Its orbit is prograde, meaning it revolves around Neptune in the same direction as the planet's orbit around the Sun.

Laomedeia is estimated to have a diameter between 37 and 42 km (23 and 26 mi), though most of its physical properties are unknown. Laomedeia shares similar orbital characteristics with two other Neptunian irregular moons, Sao and S/2002 N 5, which suggests they originated from the collisional breakup of a once-larger moon of Neptune.

== Discovery ==
Laomedeia was discovered by astronomers Matthew Holman, JJ Kavelaars, Tommy Grav, Wesley Fraser, and Dan Milisavljevic during a search for distant moons of Neptune. Led by Holman, the search began in 2001 and employed large optical telescopes on Earth to obtain numerous long-exposure images of the sky around Neptune. The team used the shift-and-add technique to align and combine the images according to Neptune's motion across the sky, which enhanced the faint moons as points of light. Through this technique, they discovered Laomedeia in images taken on 13 August 2002 by the 4-meter Víctor M. Blanco Telescope at Cerro Tololo Inter-American Observatory, Chile. Laomedeia was among the first Neptunian moons discovered from a ground-based telescope since Nereid in 1949.

To determine Laomedeia's orbit around Neptune, astronomers conducted follow-up observations at several observatories, with the help of orbit predictions by Brian G. Marsden and Robert A. Jacobson. A team led by Brett Gladman observed Laomedeia from 3 to 5 September 2002 using the 8.2 m Very Large Telescope at Cerro Paranal Observatory, while other teams observed it with the 2.5 m Nordic Optical Telescope at La Palma Observatory and the 5 m Hale Telescope at Palomar Observatory. Earlier observations of Laomedeia were found by Holman in Blanco Telescope images from 11 August 2001. The discovery of Laomedeia, alongside the Neptunian moons Halimede and Sao, was announced by the Minor Planet Center on 13 January 2003. The announcement raised Neptune's number of known moons to 11.

== Name ==
When the discovery of Laomedeia was announced, it was given the temporary provisional designation "S/2002 N 3" by the Minor Planet Center. It was later named and given the Roman numeral designation Neptune XII by the International Astronomical Union's (IAU) Working Group for Planetary System Nomenclature on 3 February 2007. In accordance with the IAU's naming convention for Neptunian irregular moons, it was named after Laomedeia (Λαομέδεια), one of the fifty Nereids or daughters of Nereus and Doris from Greek mythology. The moon was given a name ending with "a" to indicate its prograde orbit, in a similar fashion to the naming convention for Jupiter's irregular moons.

== Orbit ==
Laomedeia is an irregular moon of Neptune, meaning it follows a distant, highly eccentric, and highly inclined orbit around the planet. (Note: Neptune's moons Triton and Nereid are sometimes considered irregular moons, though researchers often discuss them separately due to their unusual orbital characteristics and disproportionately large sizes.) The moon's orbit is prograde, meaning it revolves around Neptune in the same direction as the planet's orbit around the Sun. Like many other irregular moons, Laomedeia is strongly affected by the Sun's gravity, which causes substantial long-term variations in its orbit. For this reason, Laomedeia's orbit is better described by proper orbital elements, which are calculated by averaging out its perturbed orbit over an extended period of time.

Over a 10,000-year time span, Laomedeia's semi-major axis from Neptune varies from 23.3 to 23.7 million km (14.5 to 14.7 million mi; 0.156 to 0.158 AU), averaging about 23.5 million km (14.6 million mi; 0.157 AU). In terms of average semi-major axis, Laomedeia is the outermost-known prograde moon of Neptune, though it is nearly tied with S/2002 N 5. On average, Laomedeia takes about 8.67 years (3,168 days) to complete one orbit around Neptune, though perturbations by the Sun can vary the orbital period from 8.59 to 8.78 years (3,137 to 3,206 days). While Laomedeia's orbit has an average eccentricity of 0.42 and an average inclination of 37° with respect to the ecliptic, both values vary substantially due to the Sun's perturbations. The moon's eccentricity ranges from 0.29 to 0.56, while its inclination ranges from 30° to 44°. Compared to other irregular moons of Neptune, Laomedeia's orbit variations are not as extreme.

Laomedeia does not appear to experience any orbital resonances. Its orbit exhibits both apsidal and nodal precession with periods of 2,255 and 3,154 years, respectively. Due to apsidal precession, the moon's argument of pericenter circulates uniformly from 0° to 360°. A 2004 study led by Holman suggested that Laomedeia is unlikely to collide with Neptune's large outer moon Nereid over a period of 4.5 billion years. A 2022 study led by Jet Propulsion Laboratory astrophysicists Marina Brozović and Robert A. Jacobson found that Laomedeia and Sao can approach within 320,000 km (200,000 mi) of each other during a 30,000-year time span.

The orbit of Laomedeia (blue) and other irregular moons of Neptune (gray), as seen from three different views. These moons orbit far beyond Triton and Nereid, Neptune's largest moons (colored magenta).

=== Group and origin ===
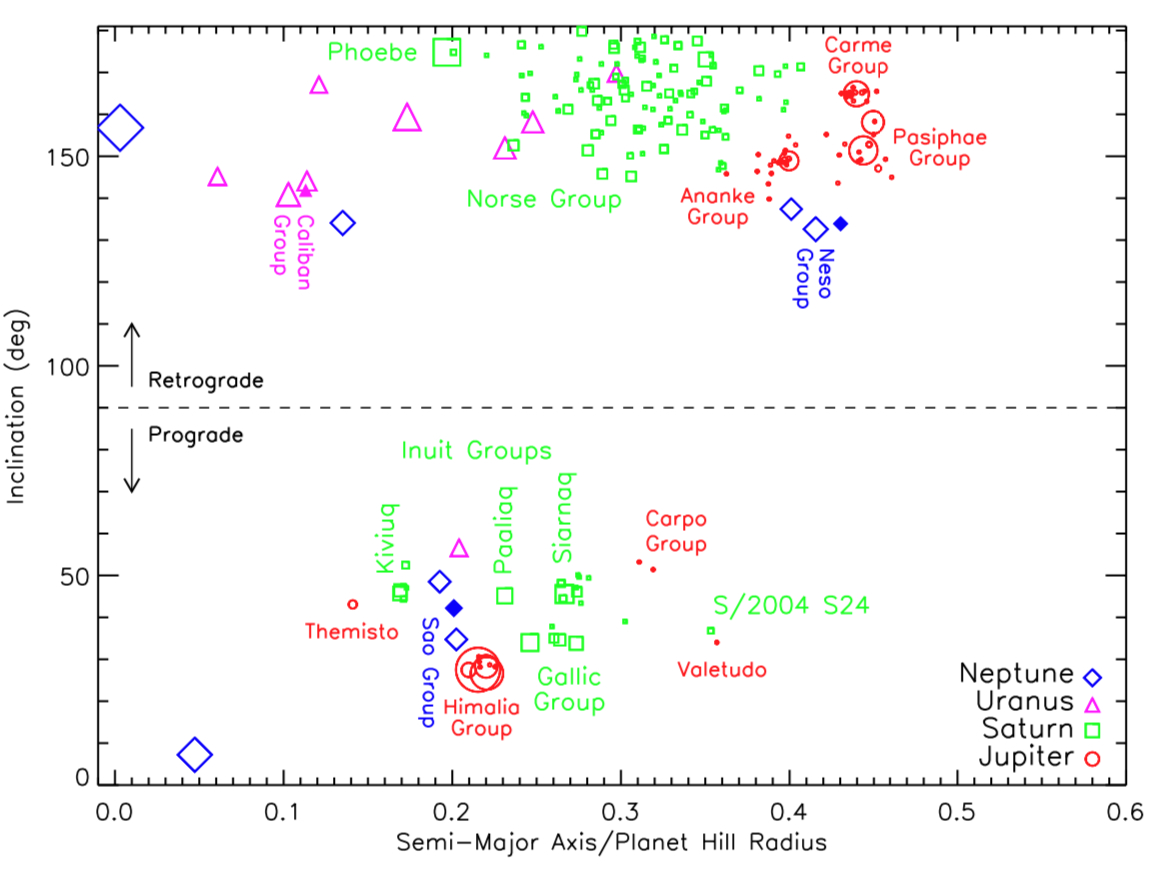
Irregular moons of all four giant planets, plotted by average distance from their planet (semi-major axis in Hill radii) and orbital inclination (degrees with respect to ecliptic). The Sao group is the cluster of prograde moons labeled in blue.

Laomedeia shares similar orbital characteristics with two other Neptunian irregular moons, Sao and S/2002 N 5. Together, they form the Sao group, a family of prograde irregular moons of which Sao is the largest member. Laomedeia was first suspected to be related to Sao in 2004. The group is predicted to contain many more smaller members, though they are too faint to be detected with current technology.

Because of their similar orbits, the moons of the Sao group have low mutual dispersion velocities between 100 and 200 m/s. The dispersion velocity is the speed needed to eject a fragment from a parent body onto its current orbit. For fragments produced in collisions, their dispersion velocities are typically below 100 m/s, comparable to the parent body's escape velocity. The minimum dispersion velocities of the Sao group are low enough to suggest that it originated from a collision, meaning it may be a collisional family. The Sao group is believed to have originated from the destruction of a once-larger irregular moon by a collision with a passing asteroid or comet. This former moon was likely gravitationally captured by Neptune during the Solar System's early history, during or shortly after the formation of the planets.

If the Sao group is a collisional family, then its members are expected to are expected to share similar surface characteristics, such as color. Compared to other collisional families, the Sao group is unusual in that two of its largest members—Sao and Laomedeia—have similar brightness and estimated sizes.

== Physical characteristics ==
Little is known about Laomedeia's physical characteristics. Like most of Neptune's irregular moons, Laomedeia is extremely faint and difficult to observe due to its small size and great distance from the Sun. In red light (R band), Laomedeia has an apparent magnitude of 25.4, making it about 100 million times fainter than what can be seen with the naked eye. Because of this, Laomedeia and most of Neptune's irregular moons can only be observed through long-exposure imaging with large optical telescopes.

The diameter of Laomedeia has not been directly measured, although it can be indirectly estimated from its brightness and an assumed geometric albedo. Assuming a geometric albedo of 0.04, Laomedeia's diameter would be about 42 km (26 mi). For a higher albedo of 0.06, Laomedeia would have a diameter of 37 km (23 mi). Laomedeia appears to be roughly the same size as Sao, if both moons have the same albedo.

== See also ==
- Other Neptunian irregular moons discovered in 2002:
  - Halimede
  - Sao
  - Neso
  - S/2002 N 5 (lost in 2002, confirmed much later in 2024)
