= 1161 Thessalia =

Main-belt asteroid

Discovery
- Discovered by: K. Reinmuth
- Discovery site: Heidelberg Obs.
- Discovery date: 29 September 1929

Designations
- Pronunciation: /θɪˈseɪliə/
- Named after: Thessaly (Greek region)
- Alternative designations: 1929 SF · 1931 BB
- Minor planet category: main-belt · (outer) background

Orbital characteristics
- Epoch 4 September 2017 (JD 2458000.5)
- Uncertainty parameter 0
- Observation arc: 87.76 yr (32,056 days)
- Aphelion: 3.4488 AU
- Perihelion: 2.8975 AU
- Semi-major axis: 3.1732 AU
- Eccentricity: 0.0869
- Orbital period (sidereal): 5.65 yr (2,065 days)
- Mean anomaly: 213.02°
- Mean motion: 0° 10^{m} 27.84^{s} / day
- Inclination: 9.3913°
- Longitude of ascending node: 72.567°
- Argument of perihelion: 309.20°

Physical characteristics
- Dimensions: 21.498±0.184 km
- Geometric albedo: 0.065±0.010
- Absolute magnitude (H): 11.2

1161 Thessalia, provisional designation 1929 SF, is a dark background asteroid from the outer regions of the asteroid belt, approximately 21 kilometers in diameter. It was discovered on 29 September 1929, by German astronomer Karl Reinmuth at the Heidelberg-Königstuhl State Observatory. It was named for the Greek region Thessaly.

== Orbit and classification ==
Thessalia is a non-family asteroid from the main belt's background population. It orbits the Sun in the outer main-belt at a distance of 2.9–3.4 AU once every 5 years and 8 months (2,065 days). Its orbit has an eccentricity of 0.09 and an inclination of 9° with respect to the ecliptic. The body's observation arc begins at Heidelberg, five weeks after its official discovery observation.

== Physical characteristics ==
=== Diameter and albedo ===
According to the survey carried out by the NEOWISE mission of NASA's Wide-field Infrared Survey Explorer, Thessalia measures 21.498 kilometers in diameter and its surface has an albedo of 0.065.

=== Lightcurves ===
As of 2017, no rotational lightcurve of Thessalia has been obtained from photometric observations. The asteroid's rotation period, poles and shape remain unknown.

== Naming ==
This minor planet was named for the Thessaly region in eastern Greece. The subsequently numbered minor planet 1162 Larissa was named after the region's capital. The official naming citation was mentioned in The Names of the Minor Planets by Paul Herget in 1955 (H 108).
