= Halimede (moon) =

Irregular moon of Neptune

- Halimede imaged by the Very Large Telescope on 3 September 2002

Discovery (Note: This is the exact order of discoverers listed by NASA, the International Astronomical Union, and the United States Geological Survey.)
- Discovered by: Matthew J. Holman; JJ Kavelaars; Tommy Grav; Wesley C. Fraser; Dan Milisavljevic
- Discovery site: Cerro Tololo Obs.
- Discovery date: 14 August 2002

Designations
- Designation: Neptune IX
- Pronunciation: /hæləˈmiːdiː/
- Named after: Ἁλιμήδη (Halimèdè)
- Alternative names: S/2002 N 1

Orbital characteristics (range) (Note: Sheppard et al. (2024) give the mean, minimum, and maximum values for Halimede's osculating orbital elements in Table 6: semi-major axis 16590500+42000 −36700 km, eccentricity 0.52+0.38 −0.33, inclination 120°+25° −9° with respect to the ecliptic, and orbital period 1879+7 −6. The error bars represent the difference between the minimum/maximum value and the average value over a 10,000-year period.)
- Observation arc: 22.14 years (8,088 d)
- Earliest precovery date: 18 July 1999
- Semi-major axis: 16,553,800 to 16,632,500 km (0.110655 to 0.111181 AU)
- Eccentricity: 0.19 to 0.90
- Orbital period (sidereal): 5.13 to 5.16 years (1,873 to 1,886 d)
- Inclination: 111° to 145° (to ecliptic)
- Satellite of: Neptune
- Group: None known

Proper orbital elements (average)
- Proper semi-major axis: 16,590,500 km (0.110901 AU)
- Proper eccentricity: 0.521
- Proper inclination: 119.6° (to ecliptic)
- Proper orbital period: 5.14 years (1,879 d)
- Precession of perihelion long.: 240.222428 arcsec / yr
- Precession of asc. node: 251.357642 arcsec / yr

Physical characteristics
- Mean diameter: 42 to 62 km (Note: The 42 km diameter estimate comes from Sheppard et al. (2024) who assume a geometric albedo of 0.1, while the 61 km diameter estimate comes from Sheppard et al. (2006) who assume a geometric albedo of 0.04.)
- Spectral type: neutral (gray); B–V = 0.89±0.10; V–R = 0.56±0.11; B–R = 1.44±0.06
- Apparent magnitude: 23.8 to 24.5 (V-band); 23.7 to 24.5 (R-band)
- Absolute magnitude (H): 9.91; 9.20±0.06 (R-band)

Halimede (/hæləˈmiːdiː/), also known as Neptune IX and previously as S/2002 N 1, is an irregular moon of Neptune. It was discovered on 14 August 2002 by Matthew Holman, JJ Kavelaars, Tommy Grav, Wesley Fraser, and Dan Milisavljevic at Cerro Tololo Inter-American Observatory in Chile. Named after one of the Nereids from Greek mythology, Halimede follows a distant, highly eccentric, and highly inclined orbit with an average orbital period of about 5.1 Earth years. Like the majority of irregular moons, Halimede's orbit is retrograde, meaning it revolves around Neptune in the opposite direction to the planet's orbit around the Sun. It is the second-innermost known retrograde moon of Neptune, after Triton.

The orbit of Halimede varies substantially over thousands of years, because it is significantly perturbed by the Sun's gravity. Over billions of years, Halimede has a high chance of colliding with Neptune's large moon Nereid. Telescope observations indicate that Halimede is a gray, non-spherical object with a diameter between 42 and 62 km (26 and 39 mi). Its color is similar to that of Nereid, which has led some astronomers to hypothesize that Halimede may be a collisional fragment of Nereid.

== Discovery ==
Halimede was discovered by astronomers Matthew Holman, JJ Kavelaars, Tommy Grav, Wesley Fraser, and Dan Milisavljevic during a search for distant moons of Neptune. Led by Holman, the search began in 2001 and employed large optical telescopes on Earth to obtain numerous long-exposure images of the sky around Neptune. The team used the shift-and-add technique to align and combine the images according to Neptune's motion across the sky, which enhanced the faint moons as points of light. Through this technique, they discovered Halimede alongside two other Neptunian moons—Sao and Neso—in images taken on 14 August 2002 by the 4-meter Víctor M. Blanco Telescope at Cerro Tololo Inter-American Observatory, Chile. Halimede was among the first Neptunian moons discovered from a ground-based telescope since Nereid in 1949.

To determine Halimede's orbit around Neptune, astronomers conducted follow-up observations at several observatories, with the help of orbit predictions by Brian G. Marsden and Robert A. Jacobson. A team led by Brett Gladman observed Halimede on 3 and 4 September 2002 using the 8.2-m Very Large Telescope at Cerro Paranal Observatory, while other teams observed it with the 2.5-m Nordic Optical Telescope at La Palma Observatory and the 5-m Hale Telescope at Palomar Observatory. Earlier observations of Halimede were found by Holman in Blanco Telescope images from 10 August 2001. The discovery of Halimede, alongside the Neptunian moons Sao and Laomedeia, was announced by the Minor Planet Center on 13 January 2003. The announcement raised Neptune's number of known moons to 11.

Following the announcement of Halimede's discovery, its discoverers conducted additional observations in 2003 and 2004 to refine calculations of the moon's orbit. During this work, they identified precovery images of Halimede from 18 July 1999, taken by an earlier survey for Neptunian moons with the Canada–France–Hawaii Telescope at Maunakea Observatory. These constitute the earliest known observations of the moon. The additional observations extended Halimede's observation arc to cover almost its entire orbital period, which allowed the discoverers to accurately determine the moon's orbit at an early stage. As of 2026, Halimede's observation arc spans more than 22 years, covering over four times its orbital period.

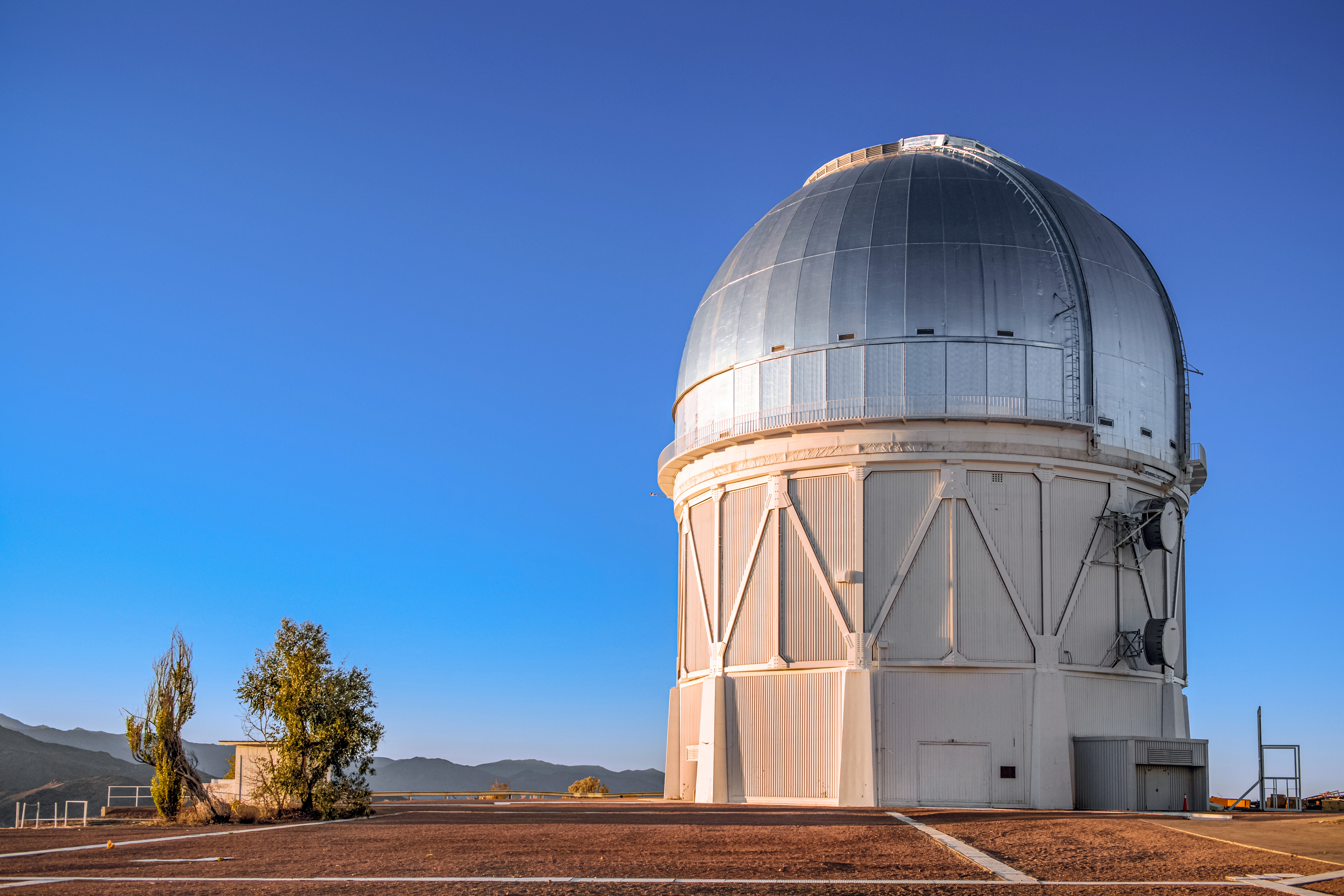
The Víctor M. Blanco Telescope was used for the discovery of Halimede in 2002.

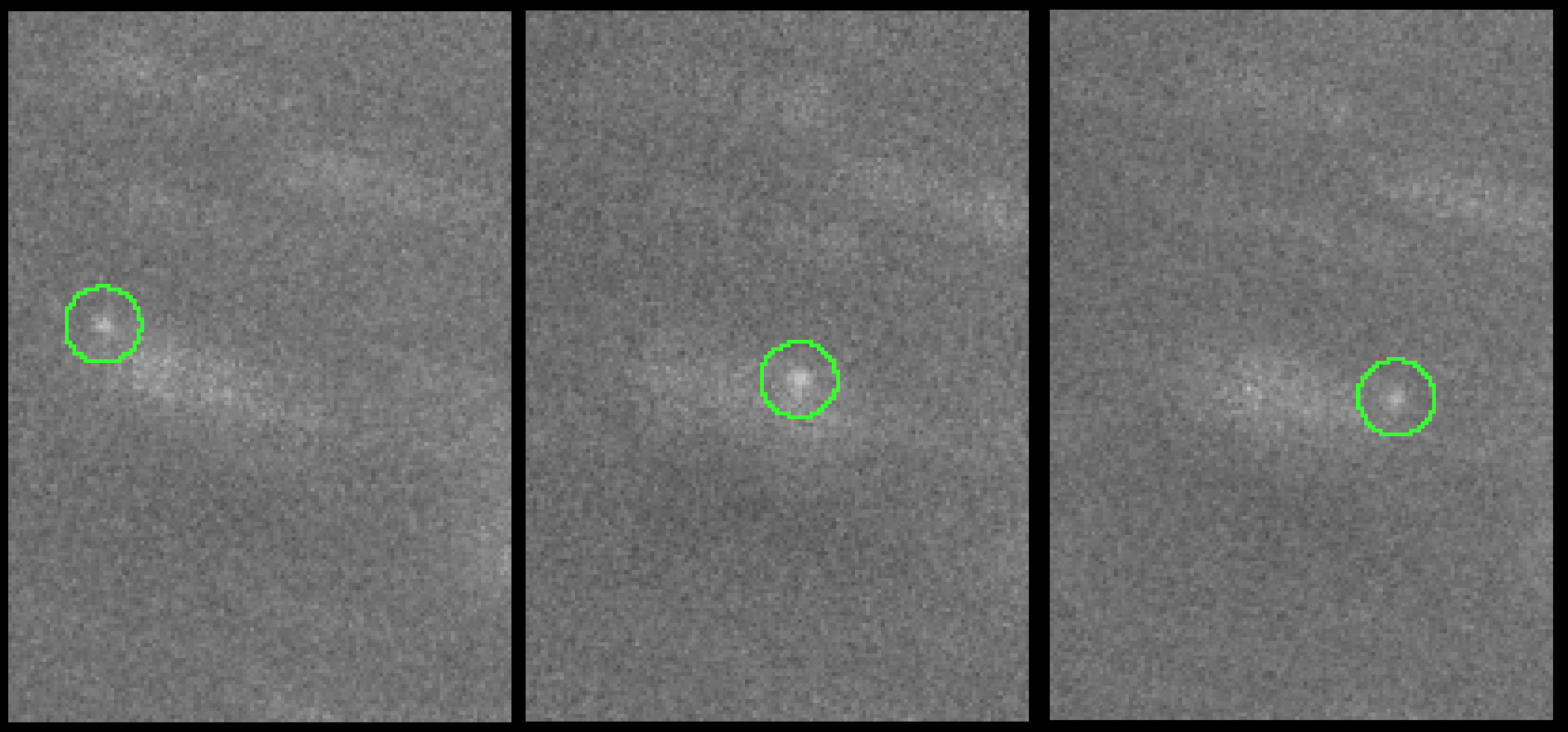
Discovery images of Halimede from the Blanco Telescope. The images were shifted-and-added to reveal Halimede as a single dot against trailed background stars.

== Name ==
When the discovery of Halimede was announced, it was given the temporary provisional designation "S/2002 N 1" by the Minor Planet Center. It was later named and given the Roman numeral designation Neptune IX by the International Astronomical Union's (IAU's) Working Group for Planetary System Nomenclature on 3 February 2007. In accordance with the IAU's naming convention for Neptunian irregular moons, it was named after Halimede, one of the fifty Nereids or daughters of Nereus and Doris from Greek mythology. The moon was given a name ending with "e" to indicate its retrograde orbit, in a similar fashion to the naming convention for Jupiter's irregular moons.

== Orbit ==
Halimede is an irregular moon of Neptune, meaning it follows a distant, highly eccentric, and highly inclined orbit around the planet. (Note: Neptune's moons Triton and Nereid are sometimes considered irregular moons, though researchers often discuss them separately due to their unusual orbital characteristics and disproportionately large sizes.) Like the majority of irregular moons, Halimede's orbit is retrograde, revolving around Neptune in the opposite direction to the planet's orbit around the Sun. Due to its great distance from Neptune, Halimede is strongly affected by the Sun's gravity, which causes gradual but substantial variations in its orbit over thousands of years. For this reason, Halimede's orbit is better described by proper orbital elements, which are calculated by averaging out its perturbed orbit over an extended period of time.

Over a 10,000-year time span, Halimede's semi-major axis from Neptune varies from 16.55 to 16.63 million km (10.28 to 10.33 million mi; 0.1106 to 0.1112 AU), averaging about 16.59 million km (10.31 million mi; 0.1109 AU). In terms of average semi-major axis, Halimede is the second-innermost known retrograde moon of Neptune, after Triton. On average, Halimede takes about 5.14 years (1,879 days) to complete one orbit around Neptune, though perturbations by the Sun can vary the orbital period from 5.13 to 5.16 years (1,873 to 1,886 days). While Halimede's orbit has an average eccentricity of 0.52 and an average inclination of 120° with respect to the ecliptic, both values vary substantially due to the Sun's perturbations. The moon's eccentricity ranges from 0.19 to 0.90, while its inclination ranges from 111° to 145°.

Among all known retrograde irregular moons in the Solar System as of 2026, Halimede has the lowest value for its average inclination. Since retrograde orbits are defined as having inclinations greater than 90°, Halimede's low inclination value means its orbit is actually highly inclined. When disregarding Halimede's orbital direction, the moon's average orbit is inclined 60° from the ecliptic. (Note: Subtracting Halimede's average orbital inclination of 120° from 180° gives 60°.) For comparison, the most inclined known prograde irregular moon, Margaret, has an average inclination of 60.5° with respect to the ecliptic.

Halimede does not appear to experience any orbital resonances, nor does it share orbit similarities with other Neptunian irregular moons. Its orbit exhibits both apsidal and nodal precession with periods of 5,395 and 5,156 years, respectively. Due to apsidal precession, the moon's argument of pericenter circulates from 0° to 360°. Halimede's longitude of pericenter circulates regularly in the direction of its retrograde orbit.

The orbit of Halimede (red) and other irregular moons of Neptune (gray), as seen from three different views. These moons orbit far beyond Triton and Nereid, Neptune's largest moons (colored magenta).

=== Relation to Nereid and origin ===
Due to Halimede's extreme eccentricity variation, its orbital path can bring it close to Nereid, one of Neptune's largest irregular moons. At maximum eccentricity and minimum semi-major axis, Halimede can come as close as 1.66 million km (1.03 million mi; 0.0111 AU) to Neptune at periapsis, (Note: Periapsis (q) and apoapsis (Q) distances are calculated from semi-major axis (a) and eccentricity (e) according to the equations $q {{=}} a(1-e)$ and $Q {{=}} a(1+e)$. A 2005 study by Matija Ćuk and Brett Gladman calculated a minimum periapsis distance of 1.3 million km (0.81 million mi) for Halimede, but this estimate was made when there was less observational data available for calculating the moon's orbit.) allowing it to cross the orbit of Nereid with a nonzero chance of colliding. A 2004 study led by Holman and collaborators estimated that Halimede has a 41% chance of impacting Nereid over a period of 4.5 billion years. During this time interval, Halimede is expected to make repeated close approaches to Nereid, leading to gravitational scattering of Halimede's orbit. However, these close encounters do not occur often, as Halimede and Nereid do not approach within 180,000 km (110,000 mi) of each other over a period of 30,000 years.

Due to Halimede's high chance of colliding with Nereid over the lifetime of the Solar System, Holman and collaborators speculated in 2004 that Halimede might be a fragment ejected by a collision on Nereid. This hypothesis was supported by another study published in the same year, which found that Halimede shares a similar color and possibly similar surface composition as Nereid. In a 2005 study, Ćuk and Gladman commented that it is only plausible for Halimede to form as a fragment of Nereid if both moons were pieces of circumplanetary debris ejected and mixed by Triton during its capture by Neptune. Alternatively, if Halimede did not form as a fragment of Nereid, it could be one of Neptune's original irregular moons, gravitationally captured by the planet during the Solar System's early history.

Evolution of Halimede's orbital eccentricity (blue), inclination (orange), argument of pericenter (green), and periapsis distance from Neptune (red) from 1600 to 2400. Halimede's eccentricity and inclination gradually decrease over time, while exhibiting short-period oscillations.

Sped-up simulation of Halimede's orbit around Neptune, viewed at an oblique angle. Beginning in 1600, Halimede had a highly eccentric orbit grazing Nereid's orbit, but it gradually circularizes by 2400.

== Physical characteristics ==
Little is known about Halimede's physical characteristics. Like most of Neptune's irregular moons, Halimede is extremely faint and difficult to observe due to its small size and great distance from the Sun. In visible light (V band), Halimede has an apparent magnitude of about 24. With apparent magnitudes this dim, Halimede and most of Neptune's irregular moons can only be observed through long-exposure imaging with large optical telescopes.

The diameter of Halimede has not been directly measured, although it can be indirectly estimated from its brightness and an assumed geometric albedo. Assuming a low geometric albedo of 0.04, Halimede's diameter would be about 62 km (39 mi). For an albedo of 0.06, Halimede would have a diameter of 54 km (34 mi). For an albedo of 0.1, Halimede would have a diameter of 42 km (26 mi). Halimede appears to be similar in size to the parent bodies that formed the Sao and Neso groups of Neptunian irregular moons.

Telescope observations from 2003 found that Halimede changes brightness significantly between days, with its V-band absolute magnitude dropping from 9.01±0.07 to 9.74±0.08 between July 27–28 and August 1. This brightness change suggests that Halimede is rotating with a non-spherical shape. The observations also showed that Halimede has a neutral (gray) color similar to that of Nereid, suggesting that they share a surface composition rich in water ice. The colors of Halimede and other Neptunian irregular moons indicate that they lack the "ultrared" material commonly seen on the surfaces of Kuiper belt objects, suggesting that their surfaces have been altered by collisions or sublimation of volatiles.

== See also ==
- Other Neptunian irregular moons discovered in 2002:
  - Sao
  - Laomedeia
  - Neso
  - S/2002 N 5 (lost in 2002, confirmed much later in 2024)
