= Reta Beebe =

American astronomer and author

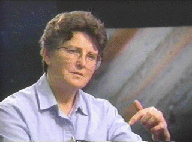
Reta Beebe in 1995

Reta F. Beebe (born October 10, 1936 in Baca County, Colorado) is an American astronomer, author, and popularizer of astronomy. She is an expert on the planets Jupiter and Saturn, and the author of Jupiter: The Giant Planet. She is a professor emeritus in the Astronomy Department at New Mexico State University and 2010 winner of the NASA Exceptional Public Service medal.

Beebe spent many years helping to plan and manage NASA missions, including the Voyager program missions to the giant planets. Her specific research interest was the atmospheres of Jupiter, Saturn, Uranus, and Neptune. She designed experiments to the study and measure the clouds and winds of the giant planets. She worked interpreting the Galileo and Cassini data and used the Hubble Space Telescope to obtain additional atmospheric data on Jupiter and Saturn. She was a member of the Shoemaker/Levy team at the Space Telescope Science Institute in 1994 when the comet struck Jupiter. Formerly, she chaired the Committee for Planetary and Lunar Exploration (COMPLEX), which is the principal space committee of the United States National Research Council. More recently she was involved with organizing the data about the giant planets in NASA's Planetary Data System. She is in charge of the Atmospheres Discipline Node of that program. Her planetary data archiving skills have also been employed by the European Space Agency. She serves on the steering committee of the International Planetary Data Alliance.

== Awards ==
- 1989 Westhafer Award for Excellence in Teaching, Research, or Creative Activity from New Mexico State University
- 1998 Dennis W. Darnall Faculty Achievement Award from New Mexico State University
- 2003 Harold Masursky Award from the Division for Planetary Sciences of the American Astronomical Society
- 2010 NASA Exceptional Public Service medal
- 2020 Elected a Legacy Fellow of the American Astronomical Society
