= Halimede (mythology) =

Greek mythological sea-nymph

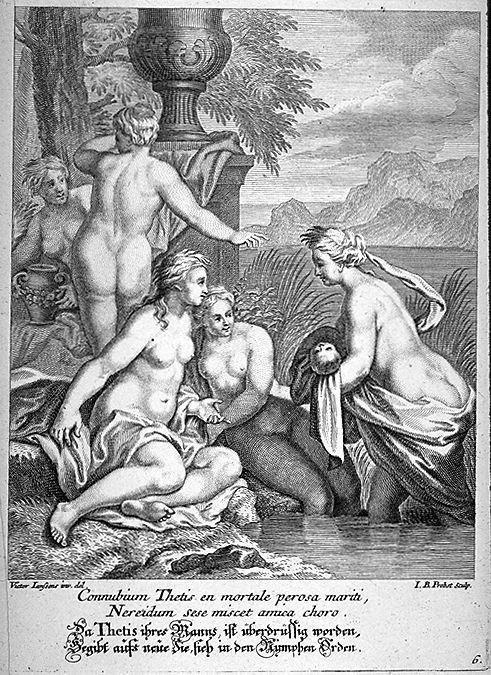
Nymphs as depicted by Johann Balthasar Probst in the 17th - 18th century

In Greek mythology, Halimede or Alimede (Ancient Greek: Ἁλιμήδη, romanized: Halimêdê, lit. 'sea-goddess of good counsel' or 'ruler/ protector of the sea') was the "rich-crowned" Nereid, sea-nymph daughter of the 'Old Man of the Sea' Nereus and the Oceanid Doris. Her name means 'the sea-goddess of good counsel'.
