= S/2002 N 5 =

Irregular moon of Neptune

- S/2002 N 5 imaged by the Very Large Telescope in September 2002

Discovery
- Discovered by: Matthew Holman; John J. Kavelaars; Tommy Grav; Wesley Fraser
- Discovery site: Cerro Tololo Obs.
- Discovery date: 14 August 2002

Designations
- Alternative names: c02N4

Orbital characteristics
- Epoch 1 January 2020 (JD 2458849.5)
- Observation arc: 21.22 yr (7,752 d)
- Satellite of: Neptune
- Group: Sao group

Proper orbital elements
- Proper semi-major axis: 23,414,700 km (0.156518 AU)
- Proper eccentricity: 0.433
- Proper inclination: 46.3° (to ecliptic)
- Proper orbital period: 8.63 years (3,151 d)
- Precession of perihelion long.: 451.707549 arcsec / yr
- Precession of asc. node: 415.317659 arcsec / yr

Physical characteristics
- Mean diameter: 24–38 km (Note: The diameter (in km) is calculated from absolute magnitude (H) and geometric albedo (p) according to the formula $D = \frac{1329}{\sqrt{p}} \times 10^{-0.2H}$. Given H = 11.2 and assuming an albedo range of 0.04–0.10, the diameter range is 24–38 km.); 23 km
- Apparent magnitude: 25.9 (average)
- Absolute magnitude (H): 11.2

S/2002 N 5, formerly called c02N4, is a small irregular moon orbiting Neptune on a very wide elliptical orbit. It was discovered on 14 August 2002 by Matthew Holman, John J. Kavelaars, Tommy Grav, and Wesley Fraser using the 4.0-meter Víctor M. Blanco Telescope at Cerro Tololo Observatory, Chile, but it became lost and was not observed again until Scott S. Sheppard rediscovered it on 3 September 2021. The discovery of S/2002 N 5 was announced on 23 February 2024, after observations were collected over a long enough time to confirm the satellite's orbit. S/2002 N 5 orbits Neptune at an average distance of over 23 million km (14 million mi) and takes almost 9 Earth years to complete one orbit.

== Discovery ==
S/2002 N 5 was first observed on 14 August 2002 by Matthew Holman and collaborators, during their search for Neptunian irregular moons using the 4.0-m Víctor M. Blanco Telescope at Cerro Tololo Observatory, Chile. Holman's team was able to detect this faint moon through the shift-and-add technique, in which they took many long-exposure telescope images, aligned and shifted them to follow Neptune's motion, and then added them together to create a single deep image that would show Neptunian moons as points of light against trailed background stars and galaxies. The moon was given the temporary designation "c02N4" and was among the faintest of the five Neptunian moons that Holman's team discovered in their search, which included Halimede, Sao, Laomedeia, and Neso. While four of these moons were successfully reobserved and subsequently announced, S/2002 N 5 was only reobserved once on 3 September 2002 by the 8.2-m Very Large Telescope at European Southern Observatory. Further attempts to reobserve S/2002 N 5 were unsuccessful. With very few observations, S/2002 N 5's orbit could not be confirmed and it became a lost moon.

S/2002 N 5 remained unobserved for 19 years since its last observation by Holman's team in September 2002. On 3 September 2021, Scott S. Sheppard rediscovered S/2002 N 5 while searching for Neptunian irregular moons with the 6.5-m Magellan–Baade Telescope at Las Campanas Observatory, Chile. Like Holman's team, Sheppard used the shift-and-add technique to detect S/2002 N 5. From September 2021 to November 2023, Sheppard and his collaborators David J. Tholen, Chad Trujillo, and Patryk S. Lykawka conducted follow-up observations of S/2002 N 5 using the Magellan–Baade Telescope and the 8.2-m Subaru Telescope at Mauna Kea, Hawaii to determine the moon's orbit and ensure it would not be lost. After Sheppard's follow-up observations concluded, his team was able to link the moon back to its original discovery observations from 2002. S/2002 N 5 and S/2021 N 1, another Neptunian irregular moon discovered by Sheppard's team, were both confirmed and announced by the Minor Planet Center on 23 February 2024, bringing Neptune's number of known moons from 14 to 16.

== Orbit ==
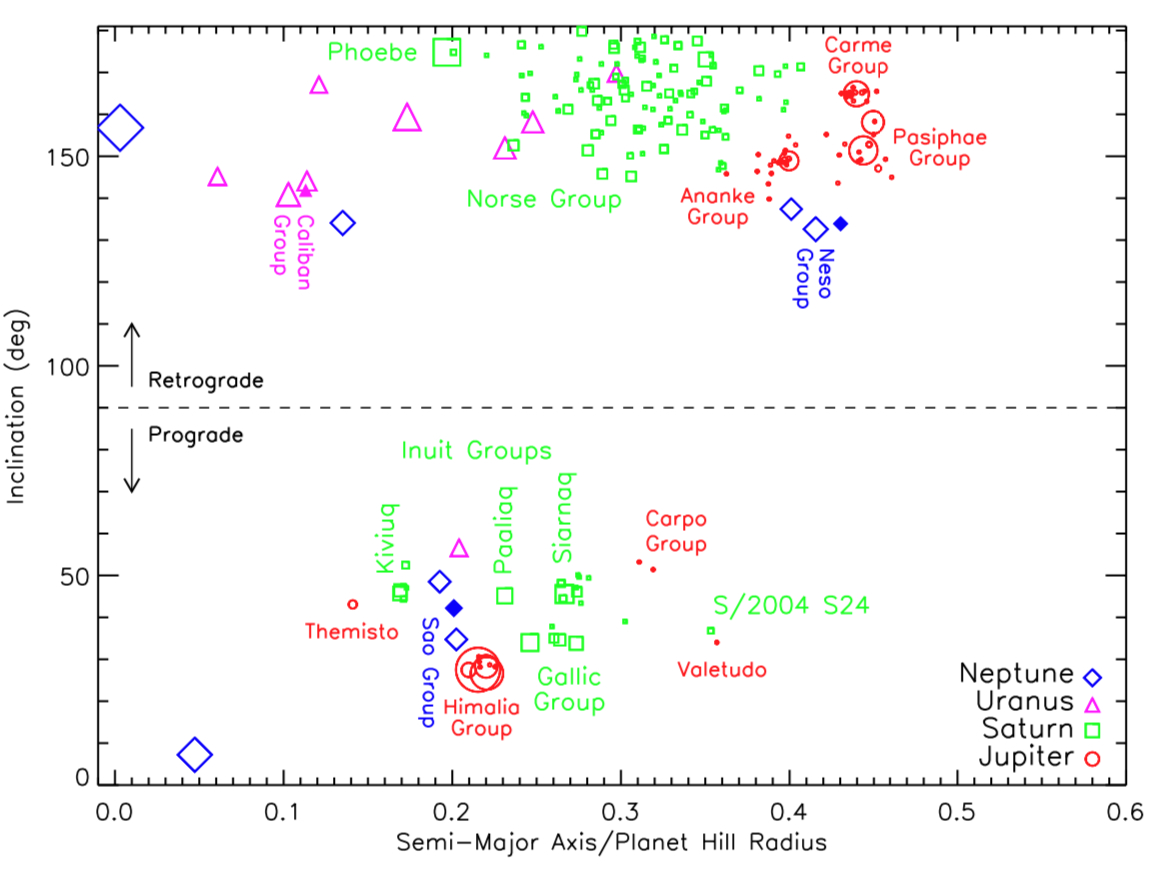
Irregular satellites of Jupiter (red circles), Saturn (green squares), Uranus (magenta triangles) and Neptune (blue diamonds; including Triton at the top left), plotted by distance from their planet (semi-major axis) in the horizontal axis and orbital inclination in the vertical axis. The semi-major axis values are expressed as a fraction of the planet's Hill sphere's radius, while the inclination is expressed in degrees from the ecliptic. The relative sizes of moons are indicated by the size of their symbols, and the Sao and Neso groups of Neptunian moons are labeled. Data as of February 2024.

S/2002 N 5 is an irregular moon of Neptune, since it has a distant, highly elliptical, and highly inclined orbit. Irregular moons are loosely bound by Neptune's gravity because of their great distance from the planet, so their orbits are frequently perturbed by the gravity of the Sun and other planets. This results in significant changes in the orbits of irregular moons over short periods of time, so a simple Keplerian elliptical orbit cannot accurately describe the long-term orbital motions of irregular moons. Instead, proper or average orbital elements are used to describe the long-term orbits of irregular moons more accurately, since these are calculated by averaging out the perturbed orbit over a long period of time.

Over an 800-year time span from 1600 to 2400, S/2002 N 5's average semi-major axis or orbital distance from Neptune is 23.4 million km (14.5 million mi; 0.156 AU), with an average orbital period of 8.6 Earth years. S/2002 N 5 has an average orbital eccentricity of 0.43 and an average inclination of 46.3° with respect to the ecliptic, or the plane of Earth's orbit. Since S/2002 N 5's orbital inclination is less than 90°, the moon has a prograde orbit, meaning it orbits in the same direction as Neptune's orbit around the Sun. Due to perturbations, S/2002 N 5's orbital elements fluctuate over time: its semi-major axis can range from 23.3 to 23.6 million km (14.5 to 14.7 million mi), eccentricity from 0.24 to 0.67, and inclination from 37° to 50°. S/2002 N 5's orbit exhibits nodal precession with an average period of about 3,100 Earth years and apsidal precession with an average period of about 2,900 Earth years.

S/2002 N 5 is part of the Sao group, a cluster of distant prograde irregular moons of Neptune that includes Laomedeia and the group's namesake Sao. The moons of the Sao group have orbital elements that are clustered with semi-major axes between 22–24 million km (14–15 million mi), eccentricities between 0.3 and 0.5, and inclinations between 30° and 50°. Like all other irregular moon groups, the Sao group is thought to have formed from the destruction of a larger captured moon of Neptune due to asteroid and comet impacts, which left many fragments in similar orbits around Neptune.

== Physical characteristics ==
S/2002 N 5 is very faint with an average apparent magnitude of 25.9, so it could only be observed with long-exposure imaging by large-aperture telescopes like the Subaru Telescope. Nothing is known about S/2002 N 5's physical properties other than its absolute magnitude of 11.2, which can be used to estimate the moon's diameter. Assuming a geometric albedo range of 0.04–0.10 that is typical for most irregular moons, S/2002 N 5 has a diameter between 24–38 km (15–24 mi). Sheppard estimates the diameter to be 23 km, which if correct would make S/2002 N 5 one of the smallest known satellites orbiting Neptune.
