= Nereid (moon) =

Moon of Neptune

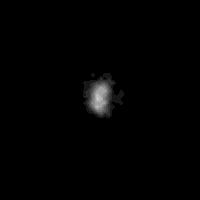
- Nereid imaged by Voyager 2 on August 24, 1989

Discovery
- Discovered by: Gerard P. Kuiper
- Discovery date: 1 May 1949

Designations
- Designation: Neptune II
- Pronunciation: /ˈnɪəriəd/ NEER-ee-əd
- Named after: Νηρηΐδες Nērēḯdes
- Adjectives: Nereidian or Nereidean (both /ˌnɛriˈɪdiən/ NERR-ee-ID-ee-ən)

Orbital characteristics
- Epoch 2000 January 1.5 (JD 2451545)
- Observation arc: 28,255 d (77.36 yr)
- Semi-major axis: 5,513,782 km (0.03685736 AU)
- Eccentricity: 0.751
- Orbital period (sidereal): 360.13 d (0.9860 yr)
- Mean anomaly: 113.4°
- Mean motion: 0° 59^{m} 58.665^{s} / day
- Inclination: 7.1° (to local Laplace plane); 5.1° (to the ecliptic); 28.4° (to Neptune's equator)
- Longitude of ascending node: 335.5°
- Argument of periapsis: −78.9°
- Satellite of: Neptune

Physical characteristics
- Mean diameter: 335–345 km
- Synodic rotation period: 11.594±0.017 h
- Albedo: 0.25–0.27
- Temperature: 50–60 K (equilibrium temperature)
- Apparent magnitude: 19.18
- Absolute magnitude (H): 4.418±0.008

Nereid, or Neptune II, is the third-largest moon of Neptune. It was the second moon of Neptune to be discovered, by Gerard Kuiper in 1949. It is notable for its unusually eccentric orbit and relatively large size for an irregular satellite. Nereid also exhibits large brightness variations over long periods of time, the origin of which has yet to be conclusively explained.

== Observational history ==
=== Discovery and naming ===
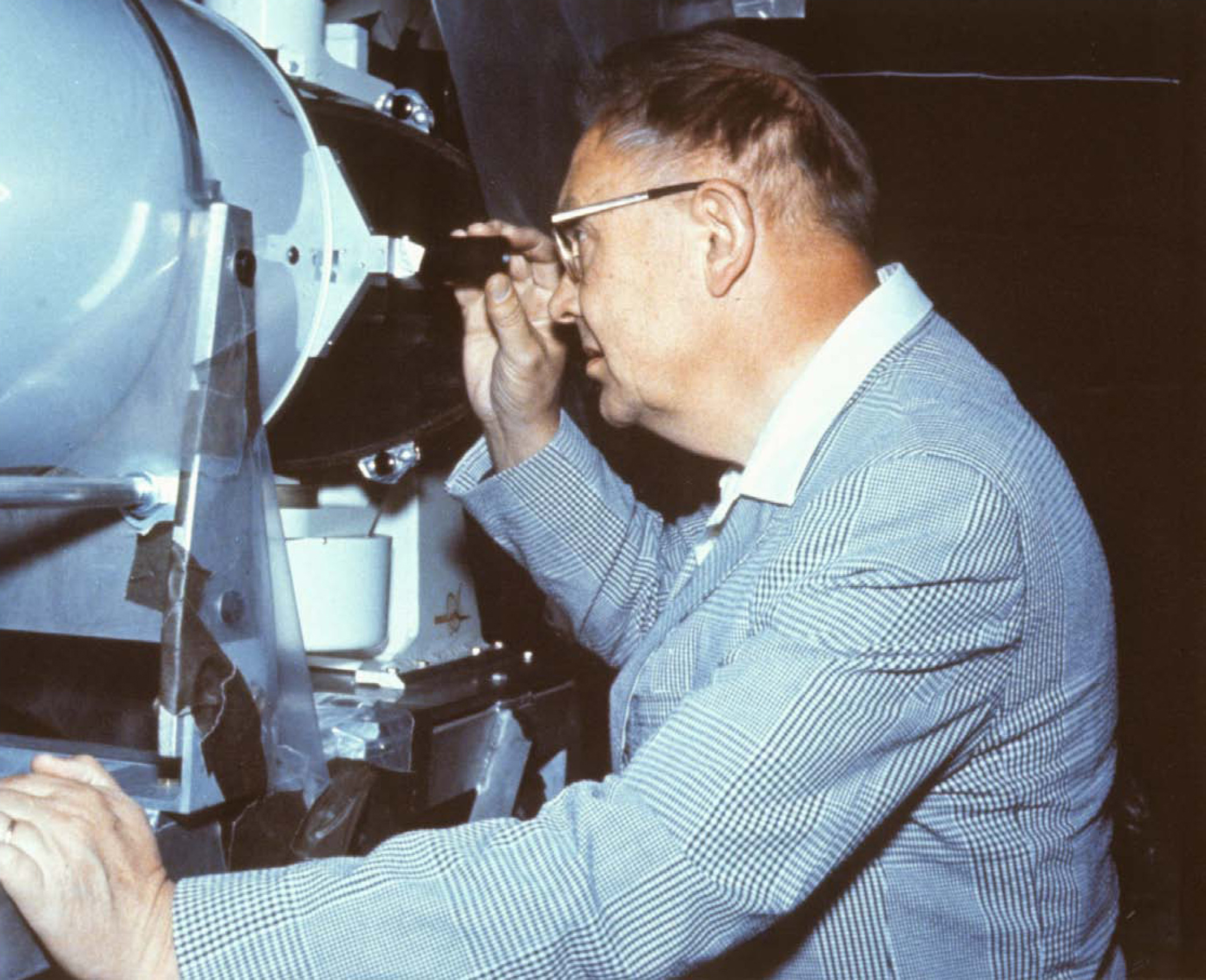
Gerard P. Kuiper, discoverer of Nereid

Nereid was discovered on 1 May 1949 by Gerard P. Kuiper using photographic plates taken with the 82-inch telescope at the McDonald Observatory. He proposed the name in the report of his discovery. It is named after the Nereids, sea-nymphs of Greek mythology and attendants of the god Neptune. It was the second moon of Neptune to be discovered, and the last before the arrival of Voyager 2 (not counting a single observation of an occultation by Larissa in 1981). In his original report, Kuiper estimated its apparent magnitude at 19.5, which stood as the only photometric information on Nereid until 1987.

=== Brightness variations ===
Since 1987 some photometric observations of Nereid have detected large variations of its brightness. Variations over a few days or within the same night have been observed, but the short term behaviour also varies as a long term trend over years and months. They persist even after a correction for distance and phase effects, and are likely related to the rotation of Nereid. Multiple independent observing groups have detected these variations, both within a single observing run and between separate runs, and the variations are too large to have been instrumental errors. On the other hand, not all astronomers who have observed Nereid have noticed any variation at all.

Short-term variations of up to ~1.5 magnitudes have been reported by observers, and across all studies, the brightness of Nereid has been seen to deviate up to −1.0 to +1.5 magnitudes away from the average. When data collection started in 1987, Nereid seemed to have very large brightness variations until 1991. This was followed by a gap of a few years with no observations, in which this active period seems to have ended. Nereid then entered an inactive state, and only showed low amplitude variations for a while until another observation gap. After the second gap, Nereid showed variations in between that of the active and inactive periods.

=== Rotation measurements ===
The rotation period was similarly in dispute. In 1991, a rotation period of Nereid of about 13.6 hours was determined, reporting a very large variation in brightness of 1.3 magnitudes. A 1997 study found no rotation period at all, with a data uncertainty of around ~0.04 mag. In 2003, a rotation period of about 11.52 ± 0.14 hours was measured, with a low peak-to-peak amplitude of only 0.029 ± 0.003 mag. This determination was later questioned by a study in 2008, who were skeptical due to their poor sampling of the light curve. Examining a data set spanning 20 years' worth of ground-based observations, they failed to detect any periodic modulation above 0.08 mag in Nereid's light curve, though their data precision did not allow them to confirm or deny the 2003 rotation period.

In 2013, a period of 11.50 ± 0.10 hours was obtained, as well as a 0.031 ± 0.001 mag variation, very similar to the 2003 results. Most recently, in 2016 a study observed Nereid with the Kepler space telescope. Scientists found it useful to measure light curves of distant objects in the Solar System for its ability to gather data uninterrupted for several weeks at a time. Closely matching the previous determinations in 2003 and 2013, Nereid's rotation period was found to be 11.594 ± 0.017 hours, and again showed only low-amplitude variations (0.033 magnitudes).

== Physical characteristics ==
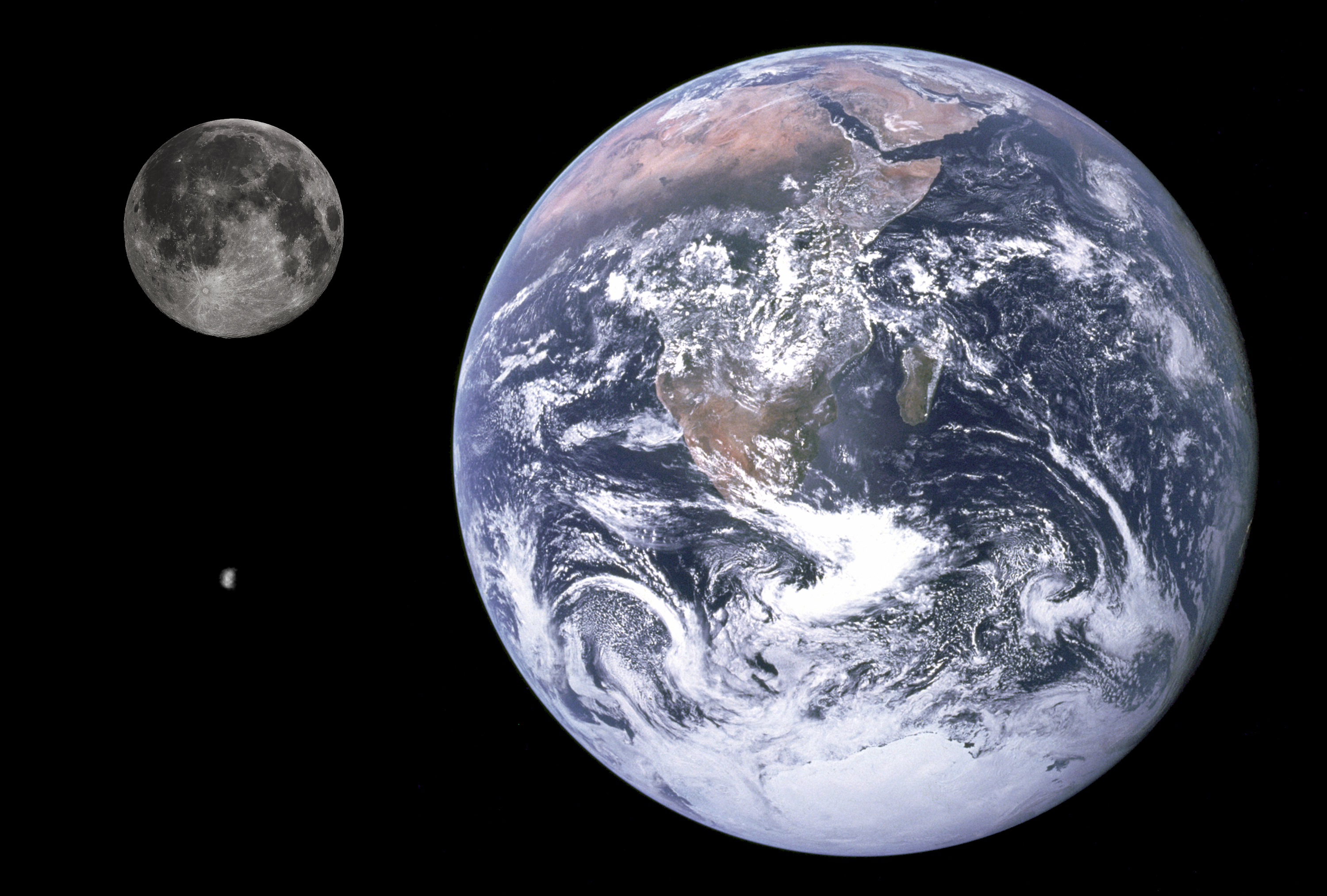
Approximate size comparison between Nereid (lower left), the Moon (upper left) and the Earth.

Nereid is the third-largest of Neptune's satellites, and has a mean radius of about 170 kilometres (110 mi), about the same size as Saturn's moon Mimas. It is by far the largest normal irregular moon known, having about two-thirds the mass of all irregular moons combined. (Triton is much larger, but is very unusual for an irregular satellite.) Nereid also accounts for about 98% of the mass of Neptune's entire irregular satellite system altogether (excluding Triton), which is similar to the situation of Phoebe at Saturn (the second-largest normal irregular moon in the Solar System).

Nereid's size is such that it may be large enough to have pulled itself into a sphere, or small enough that it has not; it lies directly within the grey area. The Voyager 2 flyby was unable to determine anything about its shape, but it is assumed that it is more likely to be generally round, similar to most other objects of its size. A 2016 study placed constraints on the possible shape of Nereid, and they found that it is at most only moderately elongated, with a maximum aspect ratio of 1.3:1. Thermal modeling based on infrared observations from the Spitzer and Herschel space telescopes, however, favoured more elongated shapes within these constraints. The thermal model also indicated that the surface roughness of Nereid is very high, likely similar to the Saturnian moon Hyperion.

Nereid may have some amount of albedo variation on its surface, as some of the observed brightness variations may be too large to be able to be explained purely by shape effects, even if Nereid had unrealistically elongated dimensions. It has been suggested that it may have a hemisphere that is much darker than the other, like Iapetus.

Nereid exhibits an exceptionally large opposition surge of 0.43 magnitude, which may partially explain some of the large brightness variations reported in the past. This is likely predominantly caused by coherent backscattering, with an unknown contribution from shadow hiding. A study found at low phase angles, Nereid's phase curve exhibits non-linear behaviour, unlike all other trans-Neptunian objects and centaurs they observed.

Spectrally, Nereid appears neutral in colour and water ice has been detected on its surface. Halimede, which displays a similar gray neutral colour, may be a fragment of Nereid that was broken off during a collision. Early work in the 1990s found that Nereid's spectrum appears to be intermediate between Uranus's moons Titania and Umbriel, suggesting that its surface is composed of a mixture of water ice and some spectrally neutral material. While irregular satellites appear to resemble Kuiper belt objects, spectroscopy performed by the James Webb Space Telescope has demonstrated that Nereid does not match the observed spectral types of Kuiper belt objects.

== Orbit and rotation ==
=== Orbit ===
Nereid's highly eccentric orbit around Neptune.

Nereid orbits Neptune in the prograde direction at an average distance of 5.51 million kilometres (3.42 million miles), roughly 15–16 times farther than that of Triton, and it takes almost one Earth year to complete an orbit. Its very high eccentricity of 0.75 takes it as close as 1.37 million kilometres (0.85 million miles) and as far as 9.65 million kilometres (6.00 million miles). Its orbit has a modest inclination of 7.1° to the Laplace plane, but the tilt is larger relative to Neptune's equator at 28.4°.

Even comparing to irregular satellites, Nereid's orbit is unusual. It has the second-most eccentric orbit of all known moons in the Solar System, after S/2023 S 38. No irregular moon has an inclination less than 26°, except for Nereid. It also has the lowest average distance and the closest approach at periapsis of any irregular moon, excluding Triton.

Due to Nereid's large size, it has a very high chance of colliding with other irregular moons in its orbital space over the lifetime of the Solar System. Anything that impacted Nereid would be presumably much smaller than it and be destroyed, which would deplete the irregular moon population over time. This is the cause of a lack of other irregular moons orbiting Neptune at distances between 1.5–15 million kilometres (0.01–0.1 astronomical units). However, the effect is limited to only this range, so moons orbiting farther than this zone are safe and unlikely to be destroyed.

=== Rotation ===
It is thought that the long term behavioural change in Nereid's brightness is caused by changes in its rotation axis, modifying its orientation over time and changing the observed geometry.

One suggestion was that its rotation was chaotic (like Hyperion) due to its highly elliptical orbit, which would be possible if Nereid deviated from a perfectly spherical shape by 1% and if its rotation rate was slower than two weeks. The random changes in its orientation over time would explain the long term inconsistencies. However, such a long rotation period could not explain the short term brightness variation. Another idea was that its axis of rotation was in the state of forced precession (like that of the precession of the equinoxes). This would imply that the long term brightness variations are periodic in nature, cycling between active and inactive periods. To precess fast enough to account for the observed differences over the years (with a precession period in the order of decades), a very elongated shape of Nereid would be required, with an axis ratio at least 1.9:1, as well as relatively long rotation periods of several days in length.

In 2016, a clear rotation period of 11.594 ± 0.017 hours was determined based on extended observations with the Kepler space telescope. This rotation is far too fast to allow for significant forced precession regardless of shape, with a precession period of hundreds of years, and also rules out a chaotic rotation state. The observing group instead proposed that the long term variation was simply from the changing point of view from Earth of Nereid's rotation axis as Neptune moved along its orbit. It was also suggested that Nereid's rotation axis was at the time most likely pointed 30° away from the direction of Earth. However, they still could not explain the very large variations observed in decades past, as their modelling only allowed for a maximum deviation of ~0.13 magnitudes.

Previous predictions for a longer rotation period were partly based on the expectation that if Nereid originally formed around Neptune, or was captured in early times, its rotation should have been slowed down by tidal effects. Nereid's fast rotation, which is typical for an irregular satellite, indicates that its rotation may have been reset later by a collision or that its capture by Neptune may have been relatively late.

== Origin and classification ==
There are two main competing theories to explain the origin of Nereid. It may be either a captured Kuiper belt object, or it was an inner moon in the past and was perturbed during the capture of Neptune's largest moon Triton. A study in 2026 found that Nereid's spectrum is markedly different from minor planets of the outer Solar System, suggesting that it formed around Neptune rather than being a captured body. If this conclusion is proven to be true, it would mean that Nereid is the last remaining intact original moon of Neptune to have survived Triton's destructive arrival.

Nereid is sometimes classified as an irregular satellite, because like all irregular satellites, Nereid has a distant, highly elliptical, and highly inclined orbit far away from Neptune's equatorial plane. However, due to its potential in-situ formation, its unique orbital properties, and being unusually large, it may be considered a perturbed regular satellite instead. Nereid is often excluded or otherwise distinguished from the other more "normal" irregular satellites.

== Exploration ==
The only spacecraft to visit Nereid was Voyager 2, which passed it while it was at the farthest point of its orbit. Its closest approach was at a distance of 4,700,000 km (2,900,000 mi) between 20 April and 19 August 1989. It obtained 83 images with observation accuracies of 70 km (43 mi) to 800 km (500 mi). Prior to Voyager 2's arrival, observations of Nereid had been limited to ground-based observations that could only establish its intrinsic brightness and orbital elements. Although the images obtained by it do not have a high enough resolution to allow surface features to be distinguished, Voyager 2 was able to measure the size of Nereid and found that it was grey in colour and had a higher albedo than Neptune's other small satellites.

If selected, the Arcanum mission would do a flyby of Nereid before its primary purposes of orbiting Neptune and observing Triton.

== See also ==
- Moons of Neptune
- Capture of Triton
