= Larissa (moon) =

Moon of Neptune

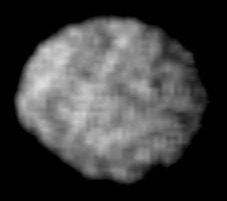
- Larissa from Voyager 2

Discovery
- Discovered by: Harold J. Reitsema, William B. Hubbard, Larry A. Lebofsky, and David J. Tholen
- Discovery date: May 24, 1981

Designations
- Designation: Neptune VII
- Pronunciation: /ləˈrɪsə/
- Named after: Λάρισσα Lārissa
- Alternative names: S/1989 N 2 S/1981 N 1
- Adjectives: Larissean, Larissan, Larissian /ləˈrɪs(i)ən/

Orbital characteristics
- Epoch 1 January 2020
- Semi-major axis: 73 548 km
- Eccentricity: 0.00121
- Orbital period (sidereal): 0.554653 d
- Mean motion: 649.054°/d
- Inclination: 0.214° (to local Laplace plane)
- Satellite of: Neptune

Physical characteristics
- Dimensions: 216 × 204 × 168 km (± 6 × 16 × 4 km)
- Mean radius: 97±3 km
- Volume: ~3.64×10^{6} km^{3} (Note: A volume of (3.5±1.0)×10^{6} km^{3} was obtained from a detailed shape model, assuming dimensions of 208 × 192 × 178 km. The long and short dimensions were estimated based on a single image, with the medium dimension simply assumed as halfway between those values. The volume has been scaled to reflect more recently obtained dimensions of 216 × 204 × 168 km based on two images.)
- Mass: ~(0.19–5.7)×10^{18} kg (Note: A density of 0.05–1.5 g/cm^{3} was calculated when assuming the volume as a sphere with a radius of 97±3 km, and assuming Larissa and Proteus share similar densities. The mass was calculated with the provided density and volume.)
- Mean density: ~0.052–1.57 g/cm^{3} (Note: Density obtained from the calculated mass and the scaled volume.)
- Surface gravity: ~0.001–0.054 m/s^{2} (Note: Surface gravity derived from the mass m, the gravitational constant G and the radius r: $\frac{Gm}{r^2}$)
- Escape velocity: ~0.015–0.095 km/s (Note: Escape velocity derived from the mass m, the gravitational constant G and the radius r: $\sqrt{\frac{2Gm}{r}}$)
- Synodic rotation period: synchronous (likely)
- Axial tilt: zero (assumed)
- Albedo: 0.091 (geometric)
- Apparent magnitude: 21.49
- Absolute magnitude (H): 6.78

Larissa, also known as Neptune VII, is the fifth-closest inner satellite of Neptune. It is named after Larissa, a lover of Poseidon (the Greek equivalent of the Roman god Neptune). Larissa is also the eponymous nymph of the city in Thessaly, Greece.

== Discovery ==
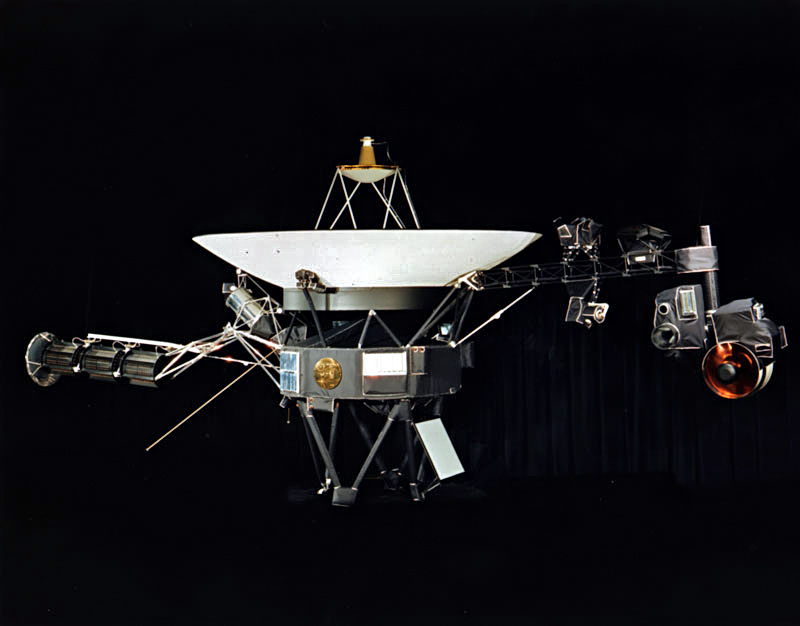
Voyager 2 was the space probe that confirmed the existence of Larissa

Larissa was first discovered by Harold J. Reitsema, William B. Hubbard, Larry A. Lebofsky and David J. Tholen, based on fortuitous ground-based stellar occultation observations on May 24, 1981. It was given the temporary provisional designation S/1981 N 1 and its supposed existence was announced on May 29, 1981. The moon was later recovered and confirmed to be the only object in its orbit during the Voyager 2 flyby in 1989 after which it received the additional designation S/1989 N 2 on August 2, 1989. The announcement by Stephen P. Synnott spoke of "10 frames taken over 5 days", which gives a recovery date sometime before July 28. The name was given and then confirmed by the International Astronomical Union on September 16, 1991.

== Characteristics ==
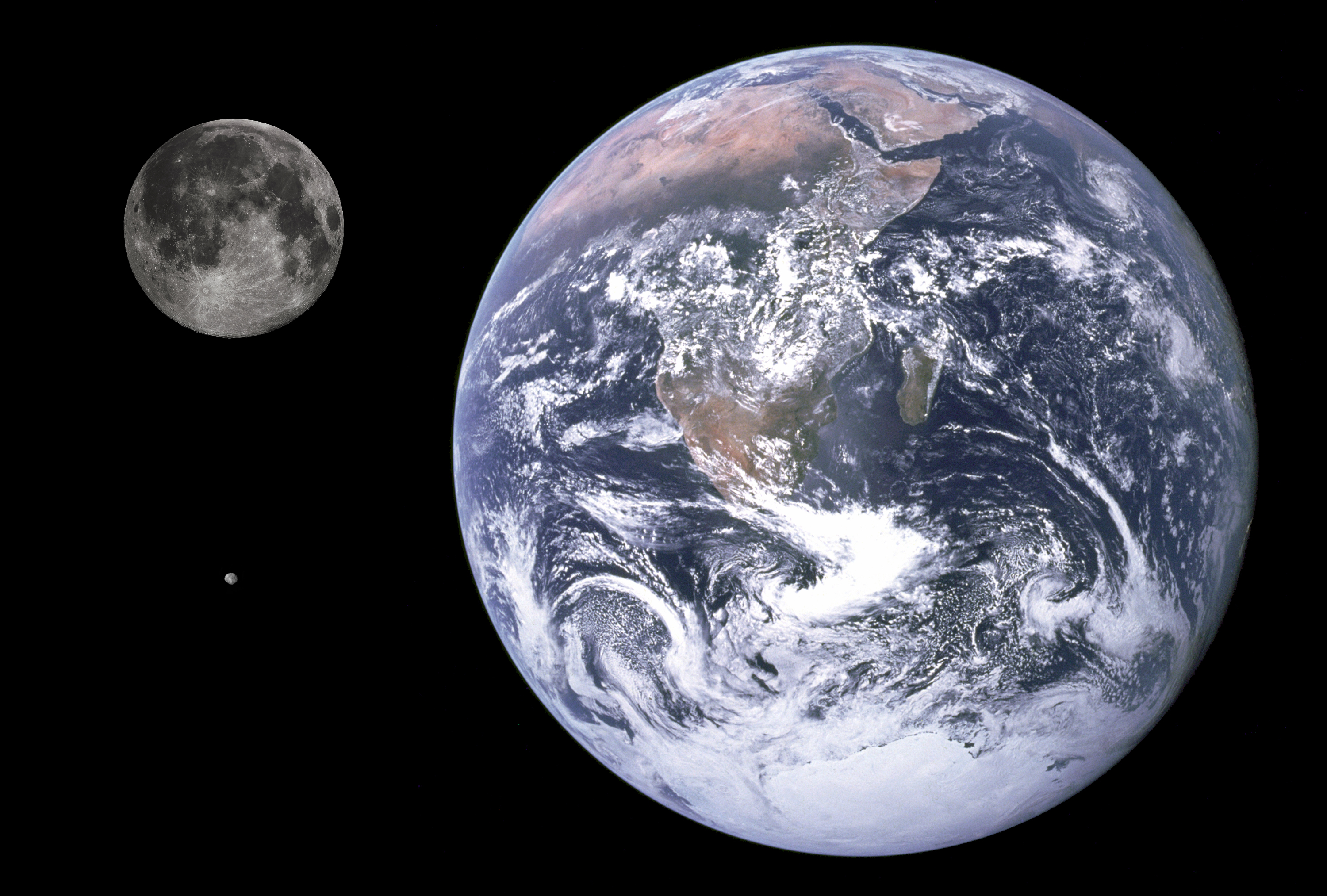
Size comparison between Larissa (lower left), the Moon (upper left) and Earth

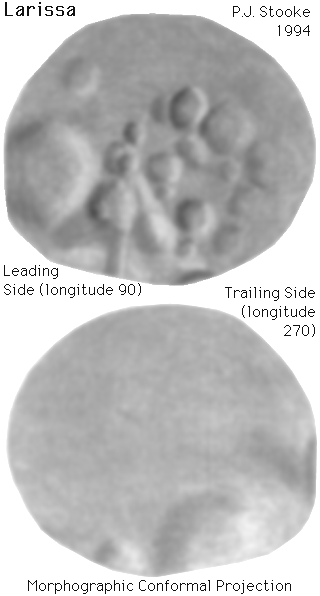
Morphographic map of Larissa, showing whatever unclear surface features that Voyager 2 was able to image during its flyby.

Larissa is the fourth-largest satellite of Neptune. It is irregular (non-spherical) in shape and appears to be heavily cratered, with no sign of any geological modification. It is likely that Larissa, like the other satellites inward of Triton, is a rubble pile re-accreted from fragments of Neptune's original satellites, which were disrupted by perturbations from Triton soon after that moon's capture into a very eccentric initial orbit.

Larissa's orbit is nearly circular and lies below Neptune's synchronous orbit radius, which means it is slowly spiralling inward due to tidal deceleration and may eventually impact Neptune's atmosphere, or break up into a planetary ring upon passing its Roche limit due to tidal stretching, similarly to how Triton will eventually collide with Neptune or break into a planetary ring.

Larissa's surface contains hydrated materials, as evidenced by a deep 3-μm OH band, phyllosilicates, and lacks clear signatures of water ice, suggesting that its composition may resemble carbonaceous chondrites and main belt asteroids such as Ceres. The presence of phyllosilicates indicate that Larissa accreted materials which was altered by prolonged exposure to water at temperatures between less than 300 to 400 K, and the bulk of this material have never been exposed to temperatures greater than 700 K, which would have dehydrated it. Its surface albedo is 0.08 albedo at 1.4 and 2.0 microns, dropping to 0.03 at 3.0 microns, and increasing to 0.09 at 4.6 microns.

== Exploration ==
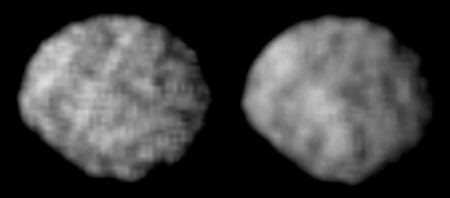
Side-by-side comparison of Larissa imaged by Voyager 2 and an enhanced version to the right

Larissa has only been visited once by Voyager 2 in 1989. The probe was able to get some photographs with details of Larissa, showing its cratered surface; unlike the other inner moons of Neptune that only appeared as dots or smudges.

== Notes ==
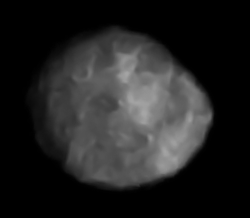
Another image of Larissa as seen by Voyager 2
