= Kepler's Dream (film) =

- Directed by: Amy Glazer
- Written by: Sylvia Brownrigg; Sedge Thomson; Ann Cummin; Amy Glazer; Vijay Rajan
- Produced by: Sedge Thomson
- Starring: Isabella Blake-Thomas; Holland Taylor; Kelly Lynch; Sean Patrick Flanery; David Hunt; Kelly Hu; Steven Michael Quezada; Esperanza Fermin; Stafford Douglas
- Cinematography: Nancy Schreiber
- Edited by: Mags Arnold
- Music by: Patrick Neil Doyle
- Production company: Boltrope
- Distributed by: Leomark Studios
- Release dates: 21 April 2016 (Julien Dubuque International Film Festival); 1 December 2017 (limited)
- Running time: 90 minutes
- Countries: United States; United Kingdom
- Language: English

Kepler's Dream is a 2016 British-American mystery drama film directed by Amy Glazer, starring Isabella Blake-Thomas, Holland Taylor, Kelly Lynch, Sean Patrick Flanery, David Hunt, Kelly Hu, Steven Michael Quezada, Esperanza Fermin and Stafford Douglas. It is an adaptation of Sylvia Brownrigg's novel, Kepler's Dream.

== Cast ==
- Isabella Blake-Thomas as Ella
- Holland Taylor as Violet von Stern
- Kelly Lynch as Amy
- Sean Patrick Flanery as Walt
- David Hunt as Abercrombie
- Kelly Hu as Irene
- Steven Michael Quezada as Miguel
- Esperanza Fermin as Rosie
- Stafford Douglas as Jackson
- Hank Rogerson as Sheriff Barkley
- Mark Sivertsen as DR Brian Lannert
- Leedy Corbin as Abby
- Tailinh Agoyo as Adela
- Carma Harvey as Nurse
- Ryan Jason Cook as Hospital Administrator
- Sedge Thomson as Pilot

== Release ==
The film was released in theatres on 1 December 2017.

== Reception ==
Frank Scheck of The Hollywood Reporter wrote that the "depiction of the slowly developing friendship and mutual respect between Violet and her granddaughter and the revelation of a tragic event from the past that sheds light on the motivations of several characters" is "far more rewarding" than the main plot, and that Blake-Thomas is "appealing and sympathetic" while Taylor "thankfully infuses subtle shadings into a character who in lesser hands could easily have come across as a stereotype."

Tatiana Craine of The Village Voice wrote that with "charming" source material, Glazer "brings a feel-good puzzler for young audiences from page to screen." Joyce Slaton of Common Sense Media rated the film 3 stars out of 5 and wrote that while the film "may be a little pat and predictable", it is "sweet all the same".

Dennis Harvey of Variety wrote that while the film was "adequately produced", it "lacks any real atmosphere or mystery" and the plot mechanics "feel predictable from the get-go". Kimber Nyers of the Los Angeles Times wrote that while the cast is "largely talented", the film "never comes together around them with its lackluster script and muddled perspective."
