= Sedge Thomson =

Sedge Thomson is an American radio personality, impresario, writer and film producer. He is best known as the host of the popular Saturday morning radio variety show West Coast Live. West Coast Live was named "Most Innovative Radio Show" by NY Radio Festival 2012–2013. Thomson has become known for his likeable and ever-curious personality, and also for his red shoes.

== Career ==
=== Radio interviewer ===
Thomson is from Berkeley, California. In the late 1980s and early 1990s he was the principal Bay Area interviewer for such groups as City Arts and Lectures. More than forty of his on-stage conversations are archived in the Bancroft Library collection at the University of California. One of his interviews with Jonathan Miller was adapted as an essay called "Among Chickens" in Granta 23: Home.

In the summers and winters of 1989-1991, Thomson served as the guest host on Fresh Air for Terry Gross when she was on vacation. On August 25, 1989, he hosted the Neptune All Night broadcast linking scientist and humorists from around the US as the first pictures came through from Voyager 2's fly-by of the planet Neptune. Excerpts and the whole PBS broadcast are found on YouTube.

For 8 years prior to West Coast Live, Sedge produced and hosted a live radio show called West Coast Weekend, heard in the San Francisco Bay Area on KQED and in Philadelphia on WHYY. During this period, Thomson wrote an original radio serial called "City Ice: The story of Quin Walker, Detective and Decent Guy." He wrote for Ian McKellen who performed with him and the cast after Thomson interviewed the actor.

West Coast Live, for which he is most widely known, featured world-renowned authors, musicians, comedians, scientists and other cultural figures who perform and are interviewed by Thomson. The show was performed onstage in front of a theater audience each Saturday morning from various Bay Area theaters, as well as on the road. It was broadcast live on KALW, Jefferson Public Radio and many other NPR stations coast-to-coast across America, and streamed online. With his program he toured extensively through Alaska and the Yukon, New York, Paris, London, Port Townsend film festivals with guests Malcolm McDowell, Debra Winger and Piper Laurie.

=== Commercials and narration ===
He performed with bassist Matthew Brubeck on a commercial for chocolate, with Thomson the voice of the cacao. He also voiced commercials for the General Motors EV1 electric car and has narrated several TV specials, including Steinbeck: A Wayward Journey which he co-produced and wrote.

=== Producer ===
From 2013 to 2015, Thomson produced the family feature film, Kepler's Dream, based on the novel by Juliet Bell. He also plays the pilot and made other uncredited contributions. The film stars Holland Taylor, Sean Patrick Flanery, Kelly Lynch, Kelly Hu, and introduced Isabella Blake-Thomas. It was filmed in New Mexico in the summer of 2014, completed in London in 2015, and released in December 2017.

Thomson is separated from novelist Sylvia Brownrigg, and they both live in Berkeley, California with their son and daughter.
