= Neptune All Night =

- Genre: Science
- No. of episodes: 1

Production
- Producer: WHYY-TV
- Production locations: Wilmington, Delaware and Pasadena, California
- Running time: 9 hours

Original release
- Release: August 25, 1989

Neptune All Night was an overnight TV program providing live coverage of the Voyager 2 fly-by of the planet Neptune. Produced by PBS affiliate WHYY-TV, the show was broadcast between midnight and 9:00 AM EDT on August 25, 1989, as Voyager 2 passed close by Neptune and its largest moon, Triton, after a 12-year flight. Carried by nearly 100 PBS stations under various titles—including Voyager All Night and Red Eye to Neptune—the broadcast featured live images from the spacecraft, subject to a four-hour signal delay due to the 4.3 billion km distance from Earth.

Programming included live images from the probe (subject to a four-hour propagation delay) interspersed with panel discussions, expert commentary, and scientific analysis. Notable participants included the astronomers Carl Sagan and Clyde Tombaugh, the science fiction author Ray Bradbury, and Apollo 9 astronaut Rusty Schweickart. Viewers could engage with the program via a toll-free call-in line. Reaction to the program was positive, with several commentators noting that coverage exceeded that of the commercial networks. In parallel with the show, the Planetary Society coordinated a number of live events at public venues.

== Program description ==
Animation of Voyager 2's trajectory from Earth to Jupiter, Saturn, Uranus, and Neptune.

Neptune All Night was a nine-hour TV program providing live coverage of the Voyager 2 space probe's fly-by of the planet Neptune. The show, produced by the Philadelphia-area PBS affiliate WHYY-TV, was broadcast between midnight and 9:00 AM EDT on August 25, 1989, as Voyager 2 passed within 4,950 kilometres (3,080 mi) of the planet Neptune and within 40,000 kilometres (25,000 mi) of Neptune's largest moon, Triton. Triton is unique in the solar system as being the largest satellite with retrograde motion.

The journey from the Earth to Neptune had taken 12 years. Carried by nearly 100 PBS stations, the program was aired under several different titles. Some stations used Voyager All Night; KAET in Phoenix, Arizona, ran it as Red Eye to Neptune. David Othmer, the show's executive producer, favored "Beyond Uranus" as a working title, but was "voted down". Five years later, WHYY would follow this up with live coverage of Comet Shoemaker–Levy 9 impacting Jupiter, as seen from the Hubble Space Telescope.

The show provided live coverage of black-and-white images transmitted from the spacecraft's two cameras interspersed with color images which had been digitally composited from data previously transmitted by Voyager. Due to Voyager's 4.3 billion km (2.7 billion mi) distance from the Earth, the images were subject to a four-hour and six minute delay, with the signal relayed through tracking stations in Australia, Spain, and the Mojave Desert in California. The program's format included 20-minute segments with NASA and Jet Propulsion Laboratory (JPL) scientists commenting on the most recent images alternating with 40 minutes of other material originating from the WHYY studio: a panel discussion with experts; commentary from science-fiction authors and well-known figures; analysis of Voyager's earlier encounters with Jupiter, Saturn, and Uranus; and "a frivolous look at space travel in movies and science-fiction literature". Viewers could call in with questions on a toll-free line, 1-800-FLY-OVER. WHYY had to settle for that number after being told by the phone company that 1-800-NEPTUNE, 1-800-VOYAGER, and 1-800-FLYBY89 were all taken; 1-800-FLYBYBY was available and received consideration, but was ultimately rejected.

Panelists included Jack Horkheimer, Judith Moffett, and Jesco von Puttkamer with Sedge Thomson hosting the show. Other well-known people scheduled to appear included Ira Flatow, who would be conducting interviews from JPL; science writer Timothy Ferris; astronomer Carl Sagan; science fiction author Ray Bradbury; astronomer Clyde Tombaugh, who discovered the planet Pluto in 1930; and Apollo 9 crew member Rusty Schweickart. At the time, Tombaugh was the only person alive who had discovered a planet. Astronomer Derrick Pitts of Philadelphia's Franklin Institute compared the show's importance to watching the first manned lunar landings and said the show would be of interest to "scientific insomniacs". The evening before the broadcast, Pitts talked about the upcoming show:

Most of our observation will be directed to what Neptune's atmosphere looks like ... Mostly we'll look at the atmosphere and turbulence. Voyager 2's pictures help us understand how planets like this come into existence, what are [the] characteristics of planets at that distance from the sun, and what we can find in other solar systems ... The atmosphere of Earth is driven by energy from the sun. More of Neptune's energy is created by the planet itself than it receives from the sun. How is energy being generated and how is it being transferred? These are some questions we have.

Funding for the show included a $35,000 (equivalent to $90,900 in 2025) grant from PBS, offsetting production costs of $50,000. In 1989, real-time dissemination of scientific data was a rarity; the live program was designed to address this, in conjunction with daily press conferences the Voyager team gave around the time of the fly-by. In a 2019 interview, Voyager project scientist Ed Stone said:

One of the things that made the Voyager planetary encounters different from missions today is that there was no internet that would have allowed the whole team and the whole world to see the pictures at the same time ... The images were available in real time at a limited number of locations.

== Reaction ==
Although commercial broadcasters, along with CNN on cable, had provided major reports in the week leading up to the fly-by, Broadcasting described the noncommercial WHYY program as "the most dramatic coverage". C-SPAN also provided coverage. Kenneth R. Clark of the Chicago Tribune noted the coverage from commercial broadcasters, but said that "PBS's continuous coverage is by far the most ambitious". Astronomer Christian Ready wrote in his blog that his attention that night was distracted from his observational work on Villanova University's 15-inch (380 mm) telescope by a TV set he had brought into the observatory to watch "image after raw, grainy image appear on the screen revealing an alien world as seen by the spacecraft".

David Paquet, who worked for a TV station in Vermont, wrote in the White River Junction Herald that the program was "a bit in the style of a telethon". Paquet noted that the archives of Vermont PBS did not contain an intact copy of the complete program. He believes that no complete professional recording was ever made, although multiple partial recordings can be found on YouTube.

== Other coverage ==
Additional live coverage of the Neptune and Triton fly-bys was provided by a series of Voyager Watch programs coordinated by the Planetary Society. The idea for these events may have originated when Davenport, Iowa, amateur astronomer Barry Ward enquired of JPL how private citizens could obtain access to a real-time feed of images from Voyager. JPL was amenable to the idea, which eventually grew into events open to the public at venues around the world. In the Davenport area, for example, presentations were made at the John Deere Planetarium at Augustana College, the Bettendorf campus of Scott Community College, and at St. Ambrose University. Ward said:

We want to show people that [the common man] can get in touch with NASA ... It's our tax dollars that support NASA, and we want to show that there's plenty of information (from NASA) that can be used in business and to improve our daily lives ... The completion of the grand tour of the solar system is one of the most important events in the history of mankind ... To me, the most exciting part will be when Voyager 2 goes behind the planet; If it emerges and we have a signal, that's the time to celebrate"

In Pasadena, California (where JPL is located), Planetfest '89 was presented at the Pasadena Convention Center, running for five days and including lectures, films, and other exhibits. The event featured speakers including Carl Sagan and former JPL director Bruce Murray. Live coverage was also available at the California Museum of Science and Industry in Los Angeles. WTBS had announced that it would rebroadcast Destination Neptune from the National Geographic Explorer series in the early evening followed by Voyager 2: Rendezvous with Neptune later that night. CNN ran daily reports hosted by Carl Sagan in the month leading up to the flyby, and the Learning Channel ran a one-hour special.

== Voyager spacecraft ==
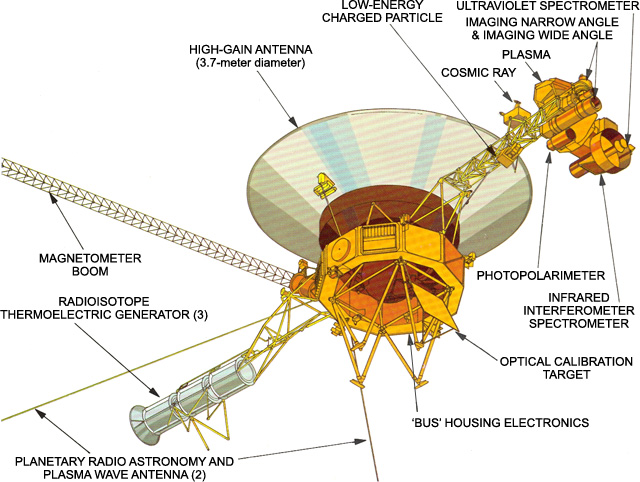
Instrumentation on Voyager

Voyager 2 was launched on August 20, 1977, with its sister craft, Voyager 1, being launched two weeks later. The original mission plan, exploring Jupiter and Saturn, was extended for Voyager 2 to explore Uranus and Neptune, a so-called grand tour of the outer planets, after the spacecraft were en-route and it was seen how well they were performing.

A few days before the flyby, it was reported Voyager 2's cameras were "somewhat worn and in need of repair". Both spacecraft were predicted to have enough power to operate until about 2015, at which point it was expected that radio contact would be lost. NASA, however, has been able to send commands and receive scientific data and telemetry well beyond that. Although contact with Voyager 2 was lost in July 2023 due to an incorrect command, communication was restored in August of that year. In September 2024, the plasma science instrument was powered down to help preserve the remaining power.
