= West Coast Live =

- Genre: Variety show
- Running time: almost 2 hours
- Country of origin: USA
- Language: English
- Home station: KALW
- Syndicates: KALW; WCL Radio Network
- Hosted by: Sedge Thomson
- Created by: Sedge Thomson
- Produced by: Case Conover
- Recording studio: San Francisco Bay Area various venues
- Original release: 1992 – 2018
- Audio format: Stereophonic
- Opening theme: Mike Greensill
- Website: http://www.wcl.org
- Podcast: http://wcl.org/podcasts/pcast.rss

West Coast Live (1985—2018) was a weekly two-hour radio variety show hosted by Sedge Thomson. The unscripted program featured interviews with world-renowned authors and cultural figures along with performances by musicians, comedians and other entertainers. It was broadcast live-to-satellite each Saturday morning in front of a theater audience from one of several San Francisco Bay area venues. The show was carried on NPR stations from coast-to-coast, and in Paris, France until 2018. Occasionally, the show traveled to theaters, music festivals and film festivals throughout the northwest. The Biospherical Digital-Optical Aquaphone (container of water sloshed for microphone), is the "trademarked signature" of Sedge Thomson.

== Past guests ==
Writers include: Diane Ackerman, Maya Angelou, Julian Barnes, T. C. Boyle, Ray Bradbury, A. S. Byatt, Joyce Carol Oates, Michael Chabon, Julia Child, Billy Collins, Junot Díaz, Jennifer Egan, Dave Eggers, Lawrence Ferlinghetti, Jonathan Safran Foer, William Gibson, Allen Ginsberg, Daniel Handler, Robert Hass, John Irving, Jamaica Kincaid, Anne Lamott, Gregory Maguire, Greil Marcus, Armistead Maupin, Michael McClure, Ian McEwan, Toni Morrison, Susan Orlean, P. J. O'Rourke, Raj Patel, Michael Pollan, Tom Robbins, Salman Rushdie, David Sedaris, Eric Schlosser, Julia Flynn Siler, Zadie Smith, Gary Snyder, Calvin Trillin, Chris Van Allsburg, Tobias Wolff, Alice Walker, Alice Waters, Irvine Welsh, Edmund White, Jacqueline Winspear, Jeanette Winterson, Naomi Wolf, Tobias Wolff, Carlos Ruiz Zafón.

Musicians include: The Blind Boys of Alabama, Greensky Bluegrass, Tim Bluhm, Billy Bragg, The Neville Brothers, Greg Brown, Sam Bush, David Byrne, Bruce Cockburn, Judy Collins, Ramblin' Jack Elliott, Tommy Emmanuel, Michael Franti, Béla Fleck & The Flecktones, David Grisman, Arlo Guthrie, Ben Harper, Richie Havens, Sean Hayes, Dan Hicks, Jolie Holland, Zakir Hussain, The String Cheese Incident, Leo Kottke, Taj Mahal, Ladysmith Black Mambazo, Ray Manzarek, Country Joe McDonald, Tuck & Patti, U. Utah Phillips, Kronos Quartet, Jonathan Richman, Peter Rowan, Blame Sally, Pharoah Sanders, Merl Saunders, John Sebastian, Chris Smither, Allen Toussaint, Charlie Hunter Trio, Trance Mission, Hot Tuna, McCoy Tyner, The Devil Makes Three, Vetiver, Loudon Wainwright III.

Actors include: Carrie Fisher, Peter Gallagher, Elliott Gould, Gene Hackman, Larry Hankin, Bill Irwin, Eddie Izzard, Terry Jones, Rita Moreno, Adam Savage & Jamie Hyneman, Richard Lewis, Robin Williams, Debra Winger, Geoff Bolt, Michael O'Brien Others include: Andre Agassi, Jerry Brown, Roger Ebert, Wavy Gravy, Spalding Gray, Guerrilla Girls, Garrison Keillor, Craig Newmark, Peter Sellars, Steve Wozniak.

== 2015 ==
- Nick Papadopoulous, CropMobster - December 19, 2015
- Steve Silberman, NeuroTribes - October 3, 2015

== 2014 ==
- A. Scott Berg, Wilson - September 27, 2014
- Eric Schlosser, Command and Control - September 27, 2014
- Charles Saumarez Smith, Royal Academy of Arts - February 1, 2014

== 2013 ==
- Dave Barry, Insane City - February 9, 2013
- Mo Willems - February 9, 2013

== 2012 ==
- Claire Peaslee - December 22, 2012
- Anne Lamott, Help Thanks Wow - December 15, 2012
- Raymond Offenheiser, Oxfam America - July 21, 2012
- Raj Patel, Stuffed and Starved - July 21, 2012
- Alice Waters, Owner of Chez Panisse Restaurant - July 21, 2012
- Raj Patel, Raymond Offenheiser & Alice Waters - July 21, 2012
- Howard Rheingold, Netsmart: How to Thrive Online - June 16, 2012
- Dhaya Lakshminarayanan - June 16, 2012
- Juliet Bell (a.k.a. Sylvia Brownrigg), Keplers Dream - May 12, 2012
- Edmund White, Jack Holmes and His Friend - February 4, 2012
- Barbara Babcock, Woman Lawyer - February 4, 2012
- Maira Kalman, Why We Broke Up - February 4, 2012
- Ellis Avery, The Last Nude - January 14, 2012
- Nicholas de Monchaux, Fashioning Apollo - January 14, 2012
- Julia Flynn Siler, Lost Kingdom - January 7, 2012

== 2011 ==
- Thomas Steinbeck, The Silver Lotus - December 10, 2011
- Mark Bowden, Worm: The First Digital World War - October 22, 2011
- Courtney E Smith, Record Collecting for Girls - September 10, 2011
- Rita Moreno, Life WIthout Makeup - September 10, 2011
- Adam Hochschild, To End All Wars - April 30, 2011
- Eric Greitens, The Heart and The Fist - April 30, 2011
- Daniel Clowes - April 23, 2011
- Donovan Hohn, Moby Duck & Susan Freinkel, Plastic - April 23, 2011
- Jacques dAmboise, I Was a Dancer - April 9, 2011
- Joyce Carol Oates, A Widows Story - April 2, 2011

== 2010 ==
- Judy Chicago, Frida Kahlo: Face to Face - December 11, 2010
- Coleman Barks, Rumi the Big Red Book - December 11, 2010
- Armistead Maupin, Mary Ann in Autumn - December 11, 2010
- Daniel Handler AKA Lemony Snicket, 13 Words - November 13, 2010
- Terry McMillan, Getting to Happy - November 13, 2010
- Alice Walker, Hard Times Require Furious Dancing- October 30, 2010
- Alexander McCall Smith, The Lost Art of Gratitude - October 23, 2010
- Julia Butterfly Hill, The Legacy of Luna - April 17, 2010
- Zachary Mason, The Lost Books of Odysseus - March 6, 2010
- TC Boyle, Wild Child - February 20, 2010

== 2009 ==
- Andre Agassi, Open: An Autobiography - November 21, 2009
- Jonathan Safran Foer, Eating Animals - November 7, 2009
- John Irving, Last Night in Twisted River - November 7, 2009
- Ben Fong Torres - August 8, 2009
- Ruth Reichl, Not Becoming my Mother - May 9, 2009
- Geoffrey Masson - May 2, 2009
- Jane E Smith - May 2, 2009
- Jane Vandenburgh - April 25, 2009
- Lynn Freed - April 25, 2009
- Alva Noe - April 11, 2009
- Brenda Webster - April 11, 2009
- RuthReichl_2009_05_09
- Alan Boss - March 14, 2009
- Zoe Heller, The Believers - March 7, 2009
- Barry Jenkins, Medicine for Melancholy - March 7, 2009
- Joe Gores, Spade and Archer - February 28, 2009
- Jacqueline Winspear, Among the Mad -
- February 28, 2009
- Stacey DErasmo, The Sky Below - January 17, 2009
- Robert Roper, Now the Drum of War - January 17, 2009
- Wes Nisker - January 10, 2009

== 2008 ==
- Spain Rodriguez, CHE, A Graphic Biography - December 13, 2008
- Maxine Hong Kingston - November 29, 2008
- Toni Morrison, A Mercy - November 22, 2008
- Eoin Colfer, The Worst Boy in the World - May 24, 2008
- Sylvia Brownrigg,
- Morality Tale - May 10, 2008
- Rabih Alameddine, Hakawati - May 10, 2008
- Robert Bly and Eavan Boland - May 3, 2008
- Elizabeth McKenzie, McGregor Tells the World - May 3, 2008
- Richard Price, Lush Life - March 29, 2008
- Gene Hackman and Daniel Lenihan, Wake of the Perdido Star - February 16, 2008
- James McBride, Song Yet Sung - February 9, 2008
- Roy Blount Jr, Long Time Leaving - February 2, 2008
- Calvin Trillin - February 2, 2008
- Ricki Lake & Abby Epstein, The Business of Being Born - January 19, 2008
- Michael Pollan, In Defense of Food - January 19, 2008

== 2007 ==
- Robert Hass, Time and Materials - December 8, 2007
- Alice Waters, The Art of Simple Food - November 24, 2007
- Bill Pullman - September 8, 2007
- Michael Chabon - June 16, 2007
- Josh Waitzkin, Searching for Bobby Fisher - June 16, 2007
- Mal Sharpe - May 26, 2007
- Helen Simpson, In the Drivers Seat - May 26, 2007
- Julia Whitty - May 26, 2007
- Bill Bryson - May 12, 2007

== 2006 ==
- Craig Newmark - November 4, 2006
- Mark Childress, One Mississippi - August 19, 2006
- Carolyn Cooke - August 12, 2006
- Sylvia Brownrigg, The Delivery Room - July 8, 2006
- Ben Fong Torres, Almost Famous - June 10, 2006
- Gary Shteyngart, Absurdistan - May 13, 2006
- John Baxter, Well Always Have Paris - April 1, 2006
- Julian Barnes, Arthur and George - February 11, 2006
- Mary Roach, Spook- February 4, 2006
- Ayelet Waldman, Love and Other Impossible Pursuits - February 4, 2006
- Allan Zweibel, The Other Shulman - February 4, 2006
- Matthew and Terces Anglehart, The Abounding River - January 28, 2006

== 2005 ==
- Doris Kearns Goodwin, Team of Rivals: The Political Genius of Abraham Lincoln - December 3, 2005
- Michael Recchiuti and Fran Gage - November 26, 2005
- Will Durst - October 22, 2005
- Howard Junker, Zyzzyva - October 15, 2005
- Gus Lee, China Boy - October 15, 2005
- Terry McMillan, The Interruption of Everything - August 20, 2005
- Melissa Bank, The Wonder Spot
- - June 11, 2005
- David Sedaris, Dress your Family in Corduroy and Denim - June 11, 2005
- Robert Bly - May 14, 2005
- Marc Ian Barasch, Field Notes on the Compassionate Life - May 7, 2005
- SARK, Sarks New Creative Companion: Ways to Free Your Creative Spirit - May 7, 2005
- Les Barker - February 19, 2005
- Irvin Yalom - February 19, 2005

== 2004 ==
- Nigella Lawson, Feast: Food to Celebrate - November 20, 2004
- Maya Angelou - October 16, 2004
- Guy Johnson- October 16, 2004
- Carl and Karl- October 2, 2004
- Annie Somerville, Greens Restaurant Chef - August 28, 2004
- David Sedaris - June 19, 2004
- Isabel Allende, Adventure Stories, My Invented Country: A Memoir - May 15, 2004
- Lang Lang, pianist and raconteur - Nov. 13, 2004

== 2003 ==
- Amy Tan - December 13, 2003
- Kathy Kamen Goldmark - August 9, 2003
- Sarah Jones - May 17, 2003
- Paul Disco - May 3, 2003
- Norman Fisher - May 3, 2003
- Noah Levine - May 3, 2003
- Paul Collins - April 12, 2003
- Po Bronson - February 8, 2003
- William Gibson - February 8, 2003
- Sarah Jones - February 1, 2003
- AS Byatt - January 25, 2003

== 2002 ==
- Salman Rushdie - September 28, 2002
- Alan Bennett- August 8, 2002
- Margaret Cho - July 13, 2002
- Anne Packer - July 13, 2002
- Eric Schlosser - January 26, 2002
- Steve Wozniak - January 26, 2002
- Lily Tomlin - January 12, 2002
- Rebecca Walker - January 12, 2002

== 2001 ==
- Lawrence Ferlinghetti - October 13, 2001
- Dave Eggers & Zadie Smith - July 21, 2001
- Doris Haddock "Granny D" - May 5, 2001

== 2000 ==
- David Sedaris - June 17, 2000
- Eddie Izzard - June 10, 2000

== 1999 ==
- Spalding Gray - January 2, 1999

== 1998 ==
- Joe Quirk - March 28, 1998

== 1997 ==
- Alice Walker - May 10, 1997
- Francesco Rosi - May 3, 1997
- Marilyn Yalom - March 1, 1997
- Oliver Sacks - February 22, 1997
- Dean Koontz - February 22, 1997
- Robert Girardi - February 8, 1997
- Diane Johnson - February 8, 1997
- Diane Ackerman - February 8, 1997
- Rigo97 - February 8, 1997

== 1996 ==
- Gary Snyder - December 14, 1996
- Julia Child - November 16, 1996
- Hettie Jones - October 10, 1996
- Dennis Hopper - October 5, 1996
- Ruth Weiss - October 12, 1996
- Charles Schultz - September 7, 1996
- Jennifer Egan - May 9, 1996
- Gus Lee - March 30, 1996
- Jamaica Kincaid - February 10, 1996
- Anne Lamott - January 6, 1996

== 1995 ==
- Tobias Wolff - November 11, 1995
- Gregory Maguire - October 14, 1995
- David Byrne - October 7, 1995
- John Berendt - September 23, 1995
- Anne Lamott - June 3, 1995
- Ray Bradbury & Robert Watson - June 3, 1995
- Paulo Coelho - May 27, 1995
- Thomas Keneally - May 6, 1995
- Oliver Sacks - March 4, 1995
- Helen Palmer - January 21, 1995

== 1994 ==
- Sylvia Earl - December 12, 1994
- Anne Lamott - December 12, 1994
- Karl and Carl - December 12, 1994
- Meredith Tromble - December 12, 1994
- Ian Frazier - December 3, 1994
- Lucy Grealy - December 3, 1994
- Howard Rheingold - December 10, 1994
- Josh Kornbluth - October 15, 1994
- Naa Kahidi - October 15, 1994
- Terry Jones - October 22, 1994
- George Takei, To the Stars - September 24, 1994
- Allen Ginsberg - September 17, 1994
- Michael McClure - August 6, 1994
- James Houston - July 9, 1994
- Bill Barich - July 2, 1994
- Whitfield Diffie - July 2, 1994
- Paul Theroux - March 19, 1994

== 1991 ==
- Sedge Thomson, Total Solar Eclipse, Baja California - July 11, 1991

== Venues ==
- The Freight and Salvage
- Yoshi's (jazz club)
- San Francisco Museum of Modern Art
- San Francisco Ferry Building
- 142 Throckmorton Theatre
- The Chapel
- The Empire Plush Room
- Cowell Theater at Fort Mason
- Venetian Room at the Fairmont Hotel
- Oregon Shakespeare Festival
- High Sierra Music Festival
- Kate Wolf Memorial Music Festival
