= Neptune =

Eighth planet from the Sun

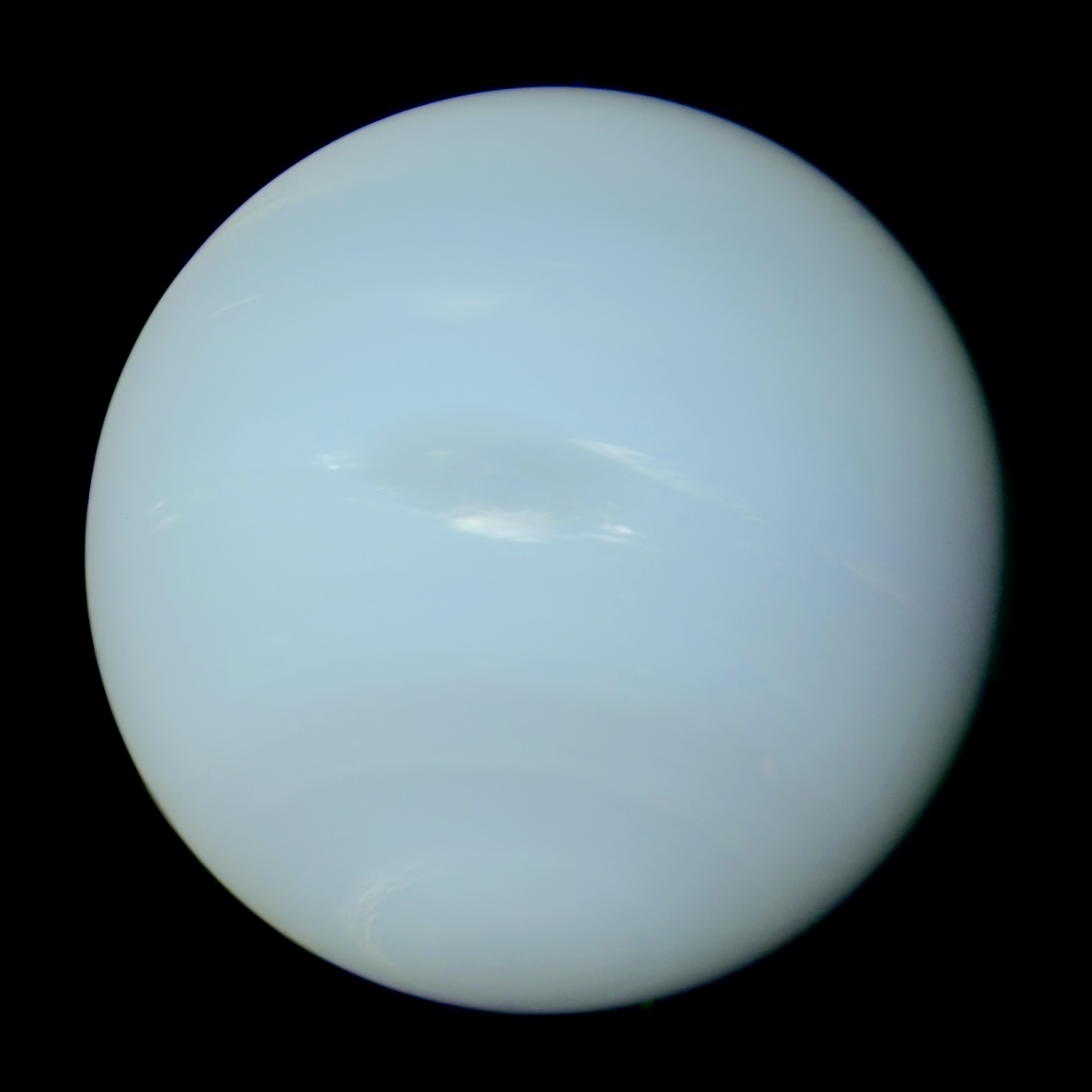
- Neptune in true colour, taken by Voyager 2 on 25 August 1989; at centre is the Great Dark Spot (Note: Neptune's dark spots are not permanent features; the large dark spot observed by Voyager 2 was designated GDS-89 for "Great Dark Spot 1989".)

Discovery
- Discovered by: Johann Galle; Urbain Le Verrier; John Couch Adams
- Discovery date: 23 September 1846

Designations
- Pronunciation: US: /ˈnɛptuːn/, UK: /-tjuːn/
- Named after: Latin Neptunus, via French Neptune
- Adjectives: Neptunian (/nɛpˈtjuːniən/), Poseidean
- Symbol: ,

Orbital characteristics (Note: Orbital elements refer to the Neptune barycentre and Solar System barycentre. These are the instantaneous osculating values at the precise J2000 epoch. Barycentre quantities are given because, in contrast to the planetary centre, they do not experience appreciable changes on a day-to-day basis from the motion of the moons.)
- Epoch J2000
- Aphelion: 30.33 AU (4.54 billion km)
- Perihelion: 29.81 AU (4.46 billion km)
- Semi-major axis: 30.07 AU (4.50 billion km)
- Eccentricity: 0.008678
- Orbital period (sidereal): 164.8 yr; 60,195 days; 89,666 Neptunian solar days
- Orbital period (synodic): 367.49 days
- Average orbital speed: 5.45 km/s
- Mean anomaly: 259.883°
- Inclination: 1.770° to ecliptic 6.43° to Sun's equator 0.74° to invariable plane
- Longitude of ascending node: 131.783°
- Time of perihelion: 2042-Sep-04
- Argument of perihelion: 273.187°
- Known satellites: 16

Physical characteristics
- Mean radius: 24,622±19 km (Note: Refers to the level of 1 bar (100 kPa) atmospheric pressure)
- Equatorial radius: 24760.6 km
- Polar radius: 24285.3 km
- Flattening: 0.0171±0.0013
- Surface area: 7.6183×10^{9} km^{2} 14.94 Earths
- Volume: 6.254×10^{13} km^{3} 57.74 Earths
- Mass: (1.024092±0.000048)×10^{26} kg 17.147 Earths; 5.15×10^{−5} Suns
- Mean density: 1.638 g/cm^{3} (Note: Based on the volume within the level of 1 bar atmospheric pressure)
- Surface gravity: 11.27 m/s^{2} (1.149 g_{0})
- Moment of inertia factor: 0.23 (estimate)
- Escape velocity: 23.5 km/s
- Synodic rotation period: 0.67125 d 16 h 6 m 36 s
- Sidereal rotation period: 0.673 day 16 h 6 min 36 s
- Equatorial rotation velocity: 2.68 km/s
- Axial tilt: 28.32° (to orbit)
- North pole right ascension: 19^{h} 57^{m} 20^{s} 299.36°
- North pole declination: 43.46°
- Albedo: 0.290 (bond); 0.442 (geom.)
| Surface temp. | min | mean | max |
|---|---|---|---|
| 1 bar level | | 72 K (−201 °C) |
| 0.1 bar (10 kPa) | | 55 K (−218 °C) |
- Apparent magnitude: 7.67 to 8.00
- Absolute magnitude (H): −6.9
- Angular diameter: 2.2–2.4″

Atmosphere
- Scale height: 19.7±0.6 km
- Composition by volume: 80%±3.2% hydrogen; 19%±3.2% helium; 1.5%±0.5% methane; ~0.019% hydrogen deuteride; ~0.00015% ethane; Icy volatiles: ammonia; water ice; ammonium hydrosulfide

Neptune is the eighth and farthest known planet orbiting the Sun. It is the fourth-largest planet in the Solar System by diameter, the third-most-massive planet, and the densest giant planet. It is 17 times the mass of Earth. Compared to Uranus, its neighbouring ice giant, Neptune is slightly smaller, but more massive and dense. Being composed primarily of gases and liquids, it has no well-defined solid surface. Neptune orbits the Sun once every 164.8 years at an orbital distance of 30.1 astronomical units (4.5 billion kilometres; 2.8 billion miles). It is named after the Roman god of the sea and has the astronomical symbol , representing Neptune's trident. (Note: A second symbol, an 'LV' monogram for 'Le Verrier', analogous to the 'H' monogram for Uranus. It was never much used outside of France and is now archaic.)

Neptune is not visible to the unaided eye and is the only planet in the Solar System that was not initially observed by direct empirical observation. Rather, unexpected changes in the orbit of Uranus led Alexis Bouvard to hypothesize that its orbit was subject to gravitational perturbation by an unknown planet. After Bouvard's death, the position of Neptune was mathematically predicted from his observations, independently, by John Couch Adams and Urbain Le Verrier. Neptune was subsequently directly observed with a telescope on 23 September 1846 by Johann Gottfried Galle within a degree of the position predicted by Le Verrier. Its largest moon, Triton, was discovered shortly thereafter, though none of the planet's remaining moons were located telescopically until the 20th century.

The planet's distance from Earth gives it a small apparent size, and its distance from the Sun renders it dim, making it challenging to study with Earth-based telescopes. Only the advent of the Hubble Space Telescope and of large ground-based telescopes with adaptive optics allowed for detailed observations. Voyager 2, which flew by Neptune on 25 August 1989, remains the only spacecraft to visit the planet. Like the gas giants (Jupiter and Saturn), Neptune's atmosphere is composed primarily of hydrogen and helium, along with traces of hydrocarbons and possibly nitrogen, but contains a higher proportion of ices such as water, ammonia and methane. Similar to Uranus, its interior is primarily composed of ices and rock; both planets are normally considered "ice giants" to distinguish them. Along with Rayleigh scattering, traces of methane in the outermost regions make Neptune appear faintly blue.

In contrast to the strongly seasonal atmosphere of Uranus, which can be featureless for long periods of time, Neptune's atmosphere has active and consistently visible weather patterns. At the time of the Voyager 2 flyby in 1989, the planet's southern hemisphere had a Great Dark Spot comparable to the Great Red Spot on Jupiter. In 2018, a newer main dark spot and smaller dark spot were identified and studied. These weather patterns are driven by the strongest sustained winds of any planet in the Solar System, as high as 2,100 km/h (580 m/s; 1,300 mph). Because of its great distance from the Sun, Neptune's outer atmosphere is one of the coldest places in the Solar System, with temperatures at its cloud tops approaching 55 K (−218 °C; −361 °F). Temperatures at the planet's centre are approximately 5,400 K (5,100 °C; 9,300 °F). Neptune has a faint and fragmented ring system (labelled "arcs"), discovered in 1984 and confirmed by Voyager 2.

== History ==
=== Discovery ===
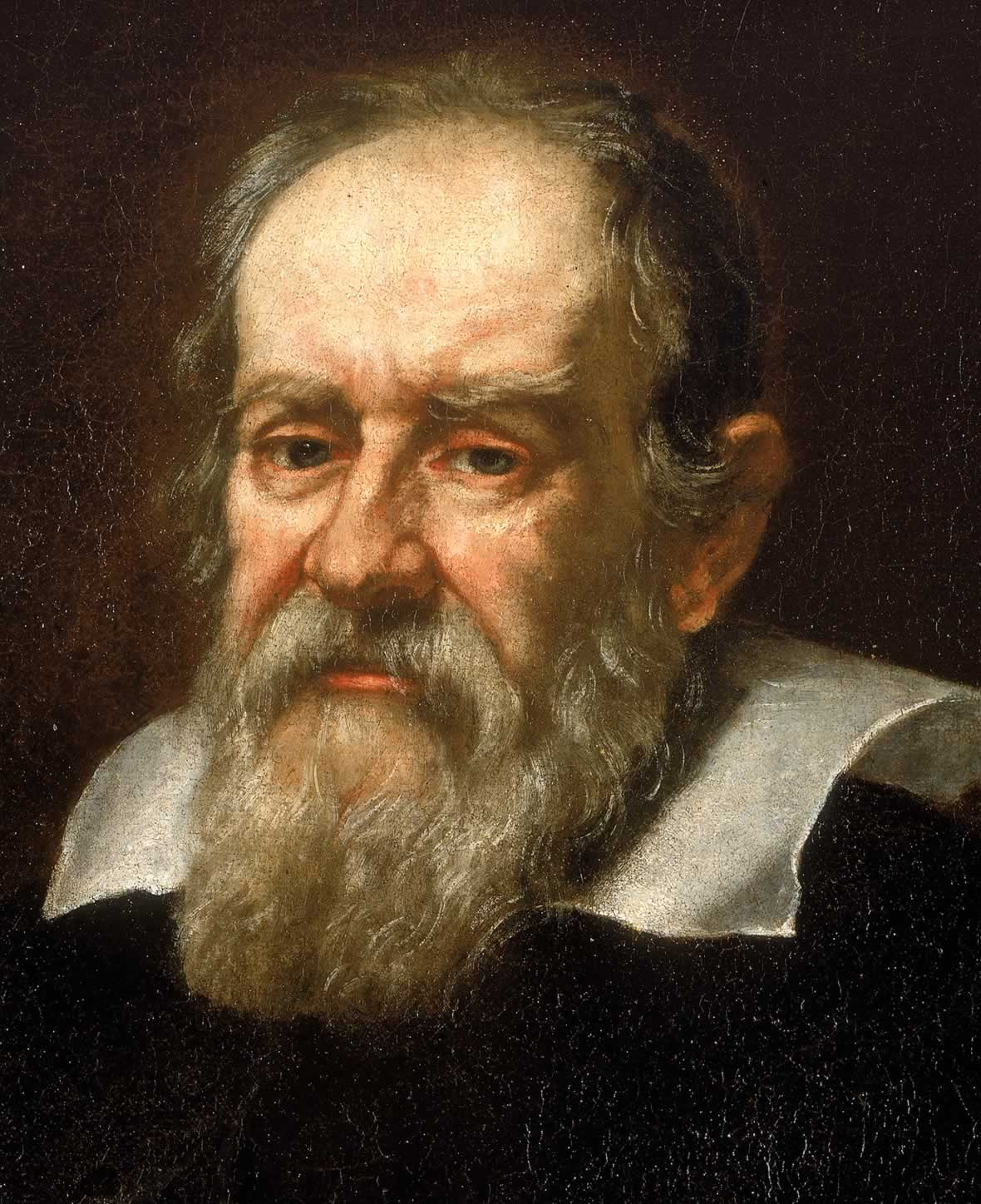
Galileo Galilei may have been the first person to sight Neptune

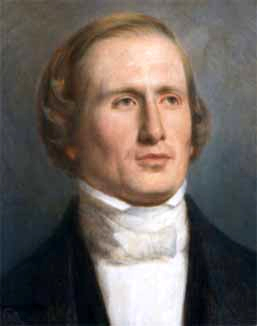
Urbain Le Verrier mostly successfully predicted Neptune's position

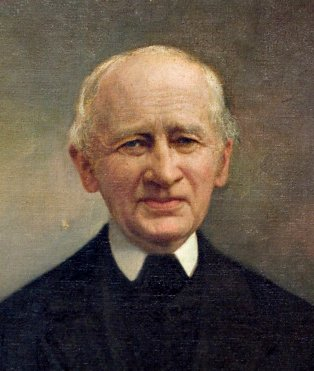
Johann Gottfried Galle was requested by Le Verrier to look for Neptune

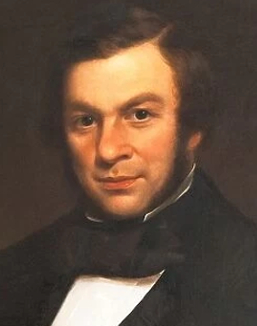
John Couch Adams independently calculated Neptune's position

Some of the earliest known telescopic observations ever, Galileo's drawings on 28 December 1612 and 27 January 1613 (New Style), contain plotted points that match what is now known to have been the positions of Neptune on those dates. Both times, Galileo seems to have mistaken Neptune for a fixed star when it appeared close—in conjunction—to Jupiter in the night sky. Hence, he is not credited with Neptune's discovery. At his first observation in December 1612, Neptune was almost stationary in the sky because it had just turned retrograde that day. This apparent backward motion is created when Earth's orbit takes it past an outer planet. Because Neptune was only beginning its yearly retrograde cycle, the motion of the planet was far too slight to be detected with Galileo's small telescope. In 2009, a study suggested that Galileo was at least aware that the "star" he had observed had moved relative to fixed stars.

In 1821, Alexis Bouvard published astronomical tables of the orbit of Uranus. Subsequent observations revealed substantial deviations from the tables, leading Bouvard to hypothesize that an unknown body was perturbing the orbit through gravitational interaction. In 1843, John Couch Adams began work on the orbit of Uranus using the data he had. He requested extra data from Sir George Airy, the Astronomer Royal, who supplied it in February 1844. Adams continued to work in 1845–1846 and produced several different estimates for the position of an undiscovered planet beyond Uranus.

Independently from Adams, Urbain Le Verrier developed his own calculations in 1845–1846 that pointed to an undiscovered planet, but aroused no enthusiasm among his compatriots. In June 1846, upon seeing Le Verrier's first published estimate of a suspected undiscovered planet's longitude and its similarity to Adams's estimate, Airy persuaded James Challis to search for it. Challis vainly scoured the sky throughout August and September. Challis had, in fact, observed Neptune a year before the planet's subsequent discoverer, Johann Gottfried Galle, and on two occasions, 4 and 12 August 1845. However, his out-of-date star maps and poor observing techniques meant that he failed to recognize the observations as such until he carried out later analysis. Challis was full of remorse but blamed his neglect on his maps and the fact that he was distracted by his concurrent work on comet observations.

Meanwhile, Le Verrier sent a letter and urged Berlin Observatory astronomer Galle to search with the observatory's refractor. Heinrich d'Arrest, a student at the observatory, suggested to Galle that they could compare a recently drawn chart of the sky in the region of Le Verrier's predicted location with the current sky to seek the displacement characteristic of a planet, as opposed to a fixed star. On the evening of 23 September 1846, the day Galle received the letter, he discovered Neptune just northeast of Iota Aquarii, 1° from the "five degrees east of Delta Capricorn" position Le Verrier had predicted it to be, about 12° from Adams's prediction, and on the border of Aquarius and Capricornus according to the modern IAU constellation boundaries.

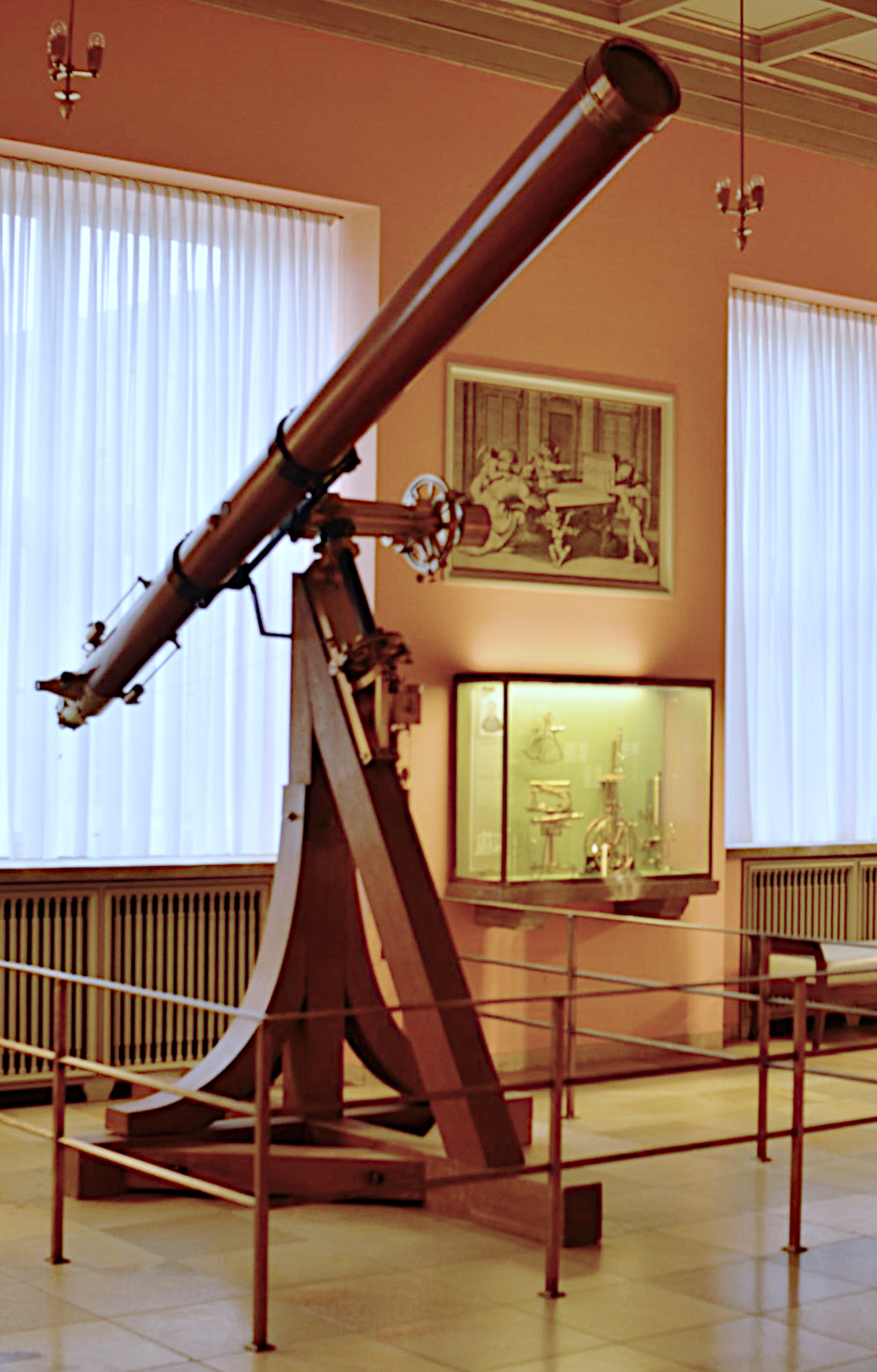
The 9" refractor used by Galle to discover Neptune

In the wake of the discovery, there was a nationalistic rivalry between the French and the British over who deserved credit for the discovery. Eventually, an international consensus emerged that Le Verrier and Adams deserved joint credit. Since 1966, Dennis Rawlins has questioned the credibility of Adams's claim to co-discovery, and the issue was re-evaluated by historians with the return in 1998 of the "Neptune papers" (historical documents) to the Royal Observatory, Greenwich.

=== Naming ===
Shortly after its discovery, Neptune was referred to simply as "the planet exterior to Uranus" or as "Le Verrier's planet". The first suggestion for a name came from Galle, who proposed the name Janus. In England, Challis put forward the name Oceanus.

Claiming the right to name his discovery, Le Verrier quickly proposed the name Neptune for this new planet, though falsely stating that this had been officially approved by the French Bureau des Longitudes. In October, he sought to name the planet Le Verrier, after himself, and he had loyal support in this from the observatory director, François Arago. This suggestion met with stiff resistance outside France. French almanacs quickly reintroduced the name Herschel for Uranus, after that planet's discoverer Sir William Herschel, and Leverrier for the new planet.

Struve came out in favour of the name Neptune on 29 December 1846, to the Saint Petersburg Academy of Sciences, after the colour of the planet as viewed through a telescope. Soon, Neptune became the internationally accepted name. In Roman mythology, Neptune was the god of the sea, identified with the Greek god Poseidon. The demand for a mythological name was in keeping with the nomenclature of the other planets, all of which, other than Earth itself, were named after deities in Greek and Roman mythology. (Note: 'Earth', in the English language, is the name of a Germanic deity, Erda, rather than being named 'Gaia' or 'Terra'."Naming of Astronomical Objects". International Astronomical Union. Archived from the original on 21 March 2024.)

Most languages today use some variant of the name "Neptune" for the planet. In Chinese, Vietnamese, Japanese, and Korean, the planet's name was translated as "sea king star" (海王星). In Mongolian, Neptune is called Dalain van (Далайн ван), reflecting its namesake god's role as the ruler of the sea. In modern Greek, the planet is called Poseidon (Ποσειδώνας, Poseidonas), the Greek counterpart of Neptune. In Hebrew, Rahab (רהב), from a Biblical sea monster mentioned in the Book of Psalms, was selected in a vote managed by the Academy of the Hebrew Language in 2009 as the official name for the planet, even though the existing Latin term Neptun (נפטון) is commonly used. In Māori, the planet is called Tangaroa, named after the Māori god of the sea. In Nahuatl, the planet is called Tlāloccītlalli, named after the rain god Tlāloc. In Thai, Neptune is referred to by the Westernized name Dao Nepchun/Nepjun (ดาวเนปจูน) but is also called Dao Ket (ดาวเกตุ, lit. 'star of Ketu'), after Ketu (केतु), the descending lunar node, who plays a role in Hindu astrology. In Malay, the name Waruna, after the Hindu god of seas, is attested as far back as the 1970s, but was eventually superseded by the Latinate equivalents Neptun (in Malaysian) or Neptunus (in Indonesian).

The usual adjectival form is Neptunian. The nonce form Poseidean (/pəˈsaɪdiən/), from Poseidon, has also been used, though the usual adjectival form of Poseidon is Poseidonian (/ˌpɒsaɪˈdoʊniən/).

=== Status ===
From its discovery in 1846 until the discovery of Pluto in 1930, Neptune was the farthest known planet. When Pluto was discovered, it was considered a planet, and Neptune thus became the second-farthest known planet, except for a 20-year period between 1979 and 1999 when Pluto's elliptical orbit brought it closer than Neptune to the Sun, making Neptune the ninth planet from the Sun during this period. The increasingly accurate estimations of Pluto's mass from ten times that of Earth's to far less than that of the Moon and the discovery of the Kuiper belt in 1992 led many astronomers to debate whether Pluto should be considered a planet or as part of the Kuiper belt. In 2006, the International Astronomical Union defined the word "planet" for the first time, reclassifying Pluto as a "dwarf planet" and making Neptune once again the outermost-known planet in the Solar System.

== Formation ==
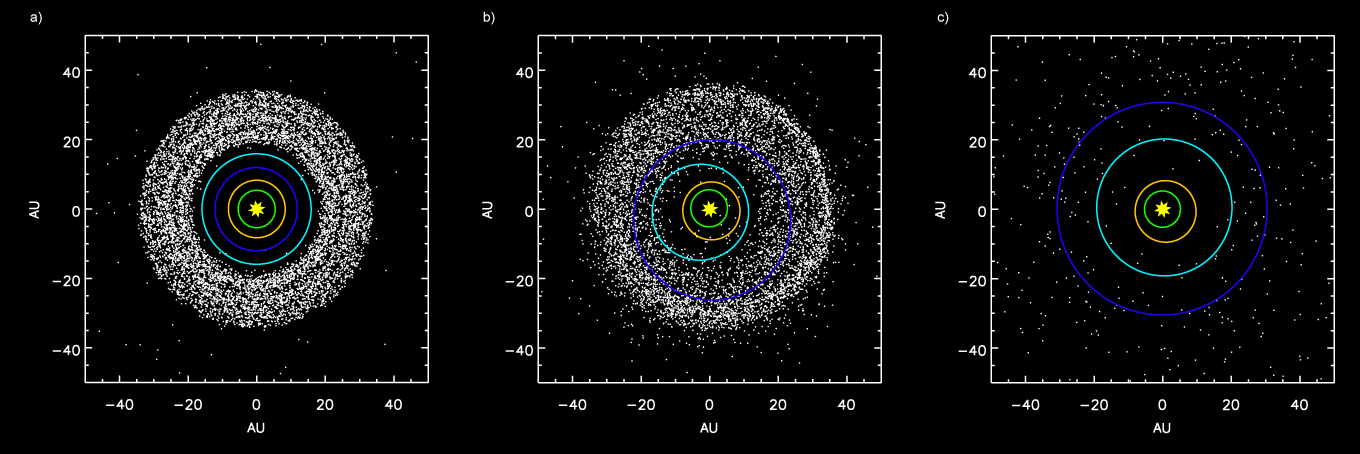
A simulation showing the outer planets and Kuiper belt: a) before Jupiter and Saturn reached a 2:1 resonance; b) after inward scattering of Kuiper belt objects following the orbital shift of Neptune; c) after ejection of scattered Kuiper belt bodies by Jupiter

The formation of the ice giants, Neptune and Uranus, has been difficult to model precisely. Current models suggest that the matter density in the outer regions of the Solar System was too low to account for the formation of such large bodies from the traditionally accepted method of core accretion, and various hypotheses have been advanced to explain their formation. One is that the ice giants were not formed by core accretion but from instabilities within the original protoplanetary disc and later had their atmospheres blasted away by radiation from a nearby massive OB star.

An alternative concept is that they formed closer to the Sun, where the matter density was higher, and then subsequently migrated to their current orbits after the removal of the gaseous protoplanetary disc. This hypothesis of migration after formation is favoured due to its ability to better explain the occupancy of the populations of small objects observed in the trans-Neptunian region. The current most widely accepted explanation of the details of this hypothesis is known as the Nice model, which is a dynamical evolution scenario that explores the potential effect of a migrating Neptune and the other giant planets on the structure of the Kuiper belt.

== Physical characteristics ==
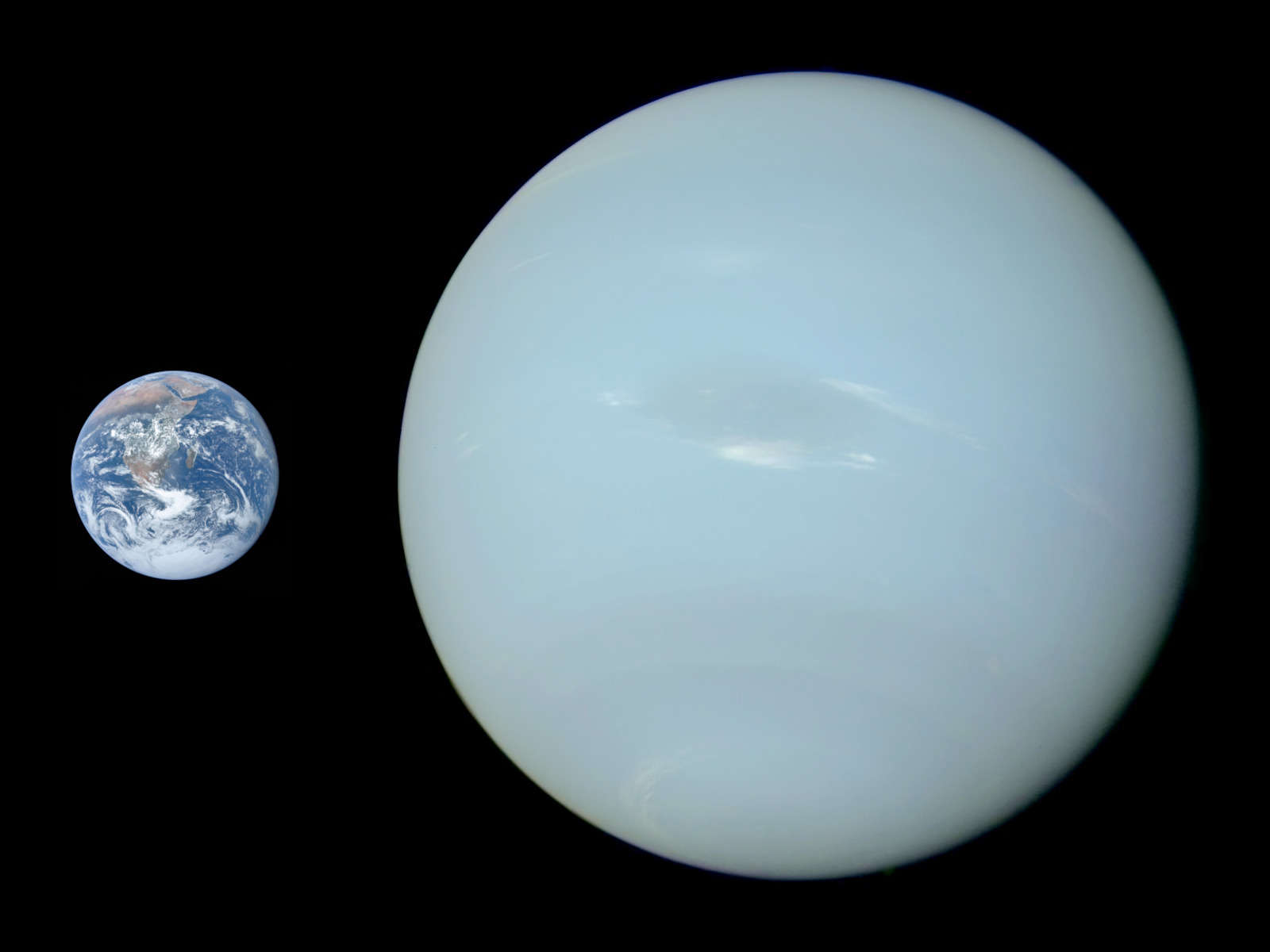
A size comparison of Neptune and Earth

Neptune's mass of 1.024×10^{26} kg is intermediate between Earth and the larger gas giants: it is 17.15 times that of Earth but just 1/19th that of Jupiter. (Note: The mass of Earth is 5.9722×10^{24} kg, giving a mass ratio $$\tfrac{M_\text{Neptune}}{M_\text{Earth}} = \tfrac{1.02 \times 10^{26}}{5.97 \times 10^{24}} = 17.15.$$ The mass of Uranus is 8.6810×10^{25} kg, giving a mass ratio $$\tfrac{M_\text{Uranus}}{M_\text{Earth}} = \tfrac{8.68 \times 10^{25}}{5.97 \times 10^{24}} = 14.54.$$ The mass of Jupiter is 1.8986×10^{27} kg, giving a mass ratio $$\tfrac{M_\text{Jupiter}}{M_\text{Neptune}} = \tfrac{1.90 \times 10^{27}}{1.02 \times 10^{26}} = 18.63.$$ Mass values from Williams, David R. (29 November 2007). "Planetary Fact Sheet – Metric". NASA. Archived from the original on 5 September 2014.) Its gravity at 1 bar is 11.27 m/s^{2}, 1.15 times the surface gravity of Earth, and surpassed only by Jupiter. Neptune's equatorial radius of 24,764 km is nearly four times that of Earth. Neptune, like Uranus, is an ice giant, a subclass of giant planet, because they are smaller and have higher concentrations of volatiles than Jupiter and Saturn. In the search for exoplanets, Neptune has been used as a metonym: discovered bodies of similar mass are often referred to as "Neptunes", just as scientists refer to various extrasolar bodies as "Jupiters".

=== Internal structure ===
Neptune's internal structure resembles that of Uranus. Its atmosphere forms about 5 to 10% of its mass and extends perhaps 10 to 20% of the way towards the core. Pressure in the atmosphere reaches about 10 GPa, or about 10^{5} atmospheres. Increasing concentrations of methane, ammonia and water are found in the lower regions of the atmosphere.

Illustration of the physical component of Neptune's interior and its surroundings in false colours

The mantle is equivalent to 10 to 15 Earth masses and is rich in water, ammonia and methane. As is customary in planetary science, this mixture is called icy even though it is a hot, dense supercritical fluid. This fluid, which has a high electrical conductivity, is sometimes called a water–ammonia ocean. The mantle may consist of a layer of ionic water in which the water molecules break down into a soup of hydrogen and oxygen ions, and deeper down superionic water in which the oxygen crystallizes but the hydrogen ions float around freely within the oxygen lattice. At a depth of 7,000 km, the conditions may be such that methane decomposes into diamond crystals that rain downwards like hailstones. Scientists believe that this kind of diamond rain occurs on Jupiter, Saturn, and Uranus. High-pressure experiments at Lawrence Livermore National Laboratory suggest that the top of the mantle may be an ocean of liquid carbon with floating solid 'diamonds'.

The core of Neptune is likely composed of iron, nickel and silicates, with an interior model giving a mass about 1.2x that of Earth. The pressure at the centre is 7 Mbar (700 GPa), about twice as high as that at the centre of Earth, and the temperature may be 5,400 K (5,100 °C; 9,300 °F).

=== Internal heating ===
Neptune's more varied weather when compared to Uranus is due in part to its higher internal heating. The upper regions of Neptune's troposphere reach a low temperature of 51.8 K (−221.3 °C). At a depth where the atmospheric pressure equals 1 bar (100 kPa), the temperature is 72.00 K (−201.15 °C). Deeper inside the layers of gas, the temperature rises steadily. As with Uranus, the source of this heating is unknown, but the discrepancy is larger: Uranus only radiates 1.1 times as much energy as it receives from the Sun; whereas Neptune radiates about 2.61 times as much energy as it receives from the Sun.

Neptune is over 50% farther from the Sun than Uranus and receives only ~40% of Uranus's amount of sunlight; however, its internal energy is still enough for the fastest planetary winds in the Solar System. Depending on the thermal properties of its interior, the heat left over from Neptune's formation may be sufficient to explain its current heat flow, though it is harder to explain Uranus's lack of internal heat while preserving the apparent similarity between the two planets.

== Rotation and magnetosphere ==
=== Rotation ===
The axial tilt of Neptune is 28.32°, which is similar to the tilts of Earth (23°) and Mars (25°). As a result, Neptune experiences seasonal changes similar to those on Earth. The long orbital period of Neptune means that the seasons last for forty Earth years. Its sidereal rotation period (day) is roughly 16.11 hours. Because its axial tilt is comparable to Earth's, the variation in the length of its day over the course of its long year is not any more extreme.

Because Neptune is not a solid body, its atmosphere undergoes differential rotation. The wide equatorial zone rotates with a period of about 18 hours, which is slower than the 16.1-hour rotation of the planet's magnetic field. By contrast, the reverse is true for the polar regions where the rotation period is 12 hours. This differential rotation is the most pronounced of any planet in the Solar System, and it results in strong latitudinal wind shear.

=== Magnetosphere ===
Neptune's magnetosphere consists of a magnetic field that is strongly tilted relative to its rotational axis at 47° and offset of at least 0.55 radius (~13,500 km) from the planet's physical centre—resembling Uranus's magnetosphere. Before the arrival of Voyager 2 to Neptune, it was hypothesized that Uranus's sideways rotation caused its tilted magnetosphere. In comparing the magnetic fields of the two planets, scientists now think the extreme orientation may be characteristic of flows in the planets' interiors. This field may be generated by convective fluid motions in a thin spherical shell of electrically conducting liquids (probably a combination of ammonia, methane and water), resulting in a dynamo action.

The dipole component of the magnetic field at the magnetic equator of Neptune is about 14 microteslas (0.14 G). The dipole magnetic moment of Neptune is about 2.2 × 10^{17} T·m^{3} (14 μT·R_{N}^{3}, where R_{N} is the radius of Neptune). Neptune's magnetic field has a complex geometry that includes relatively large contributions from non-dipolar components, including a strong quadrupole moment that may exceed the dipole moment in strength. By contrast, Earth, Jupiter and Saturn have only relatively small quadrupole moments, and their fields are less tilted from the polar axis. The large quadrupole moment of Neptune may be the result of an offset from the planet's centre and geometrical constraints of the field's dynamo generator.

Neptune's bow shock, where the magnetosphere begins to slow the solar wind, occurs at a distance of 34.9 times the radius of the planet. The magnetopause, where the pressure of the magnetosphere counterbalances the solar wind, lies at a distance of 23–26.5 times the radius of Neptune. The tail of the magnetosphere extends out to at least 72 times the radius of Neptune, and likely much farther.

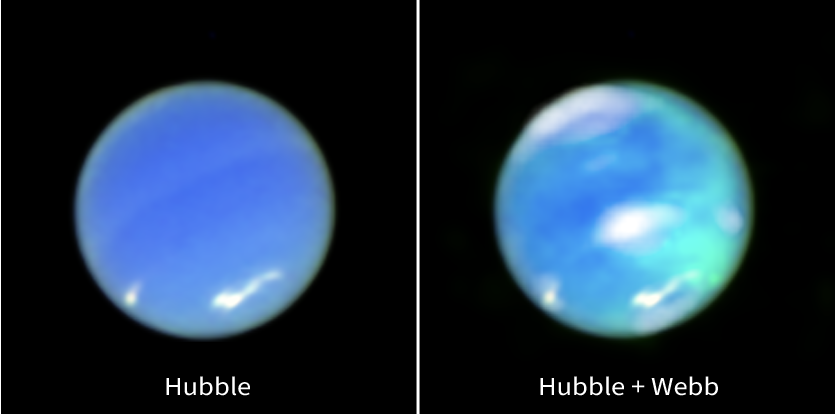
Left: a visible light image of Neptune taken by the Hubble Space Telescope. Right: the Hubble image composited with a near-infrared image taken by the James Webb Telescope. As the aurorae cannot be observed in the visible band, their image in near-infrared has been rendered as shades of cyan.

Measurements by Voyager 2 in extreme-ultraviolet and radio frequencies revealed that Neptune has faint and weak but complex and unique aurorae; however, these observations were limited in time and did not contain infrared. Subsequent astronomers using the Hubble Space Telescope have not glimpsed the aurorae, in contrast to the more well-defined aurorae of Uranus. In 2023 the James Webb Space Telescope observed Neptune's atmosphere and made the first detection of the trihydrogen cation ($\ce{H3+}$) at the planet. This finding was only possible due to the increased spatial resolution of JWST which allowed separation of the narrow $\ce{H3+}$ emissions from the broad reflected sunlight of the clouds below. Some of these emissions follow temperature, ion density, and spatial trends consistent with aurora, implying this was also the first observation of Neptune's infrared aurora. The nature of Neptune's aurorae is greatly influenced by the peculiar nature of its magnetic field. Both Uranus' and Neptune's magnetic poles are not aligned with the planets' rotational poles, making their aurorae mostly occur around the mid-latitudes rather than the poles like Earth or Jupiter.

== Colour ==
Neptune's atmosphere is faintly blue in the optical spectrum, only slightly more saturated than the blue of Uranus's atmosphere. This is due to the presence of methane in its atmosphere.

On 25 August 1989, the Voyager 2 spacecraft performed a flyby of Neptune; its renderings greatly exaggerated Neptune's colour contrast "to better reveal the clouds, bands and winds", making it seem deep blue compared to Uranus's off-white, creating the myth that Neptune was a deep azure colour. The two planets had been imaged with different systems, making it hard to directly compare the resulting composite images. This was revisited with the colour normalized over time, most comprehensively in late 2023.

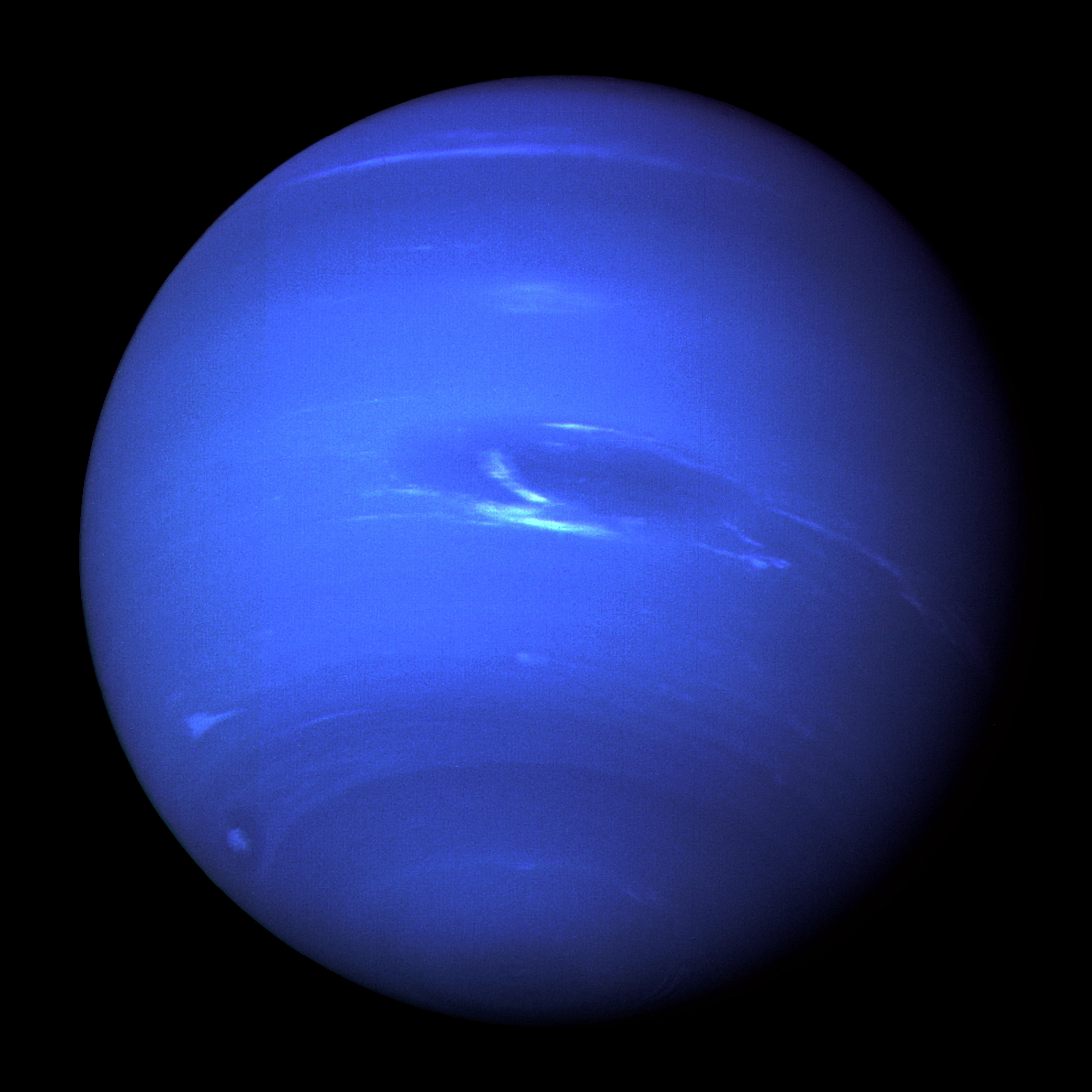
Original 2-colour (orange-green) NASA/JPL image from Voyager 2, with exaggerated colour

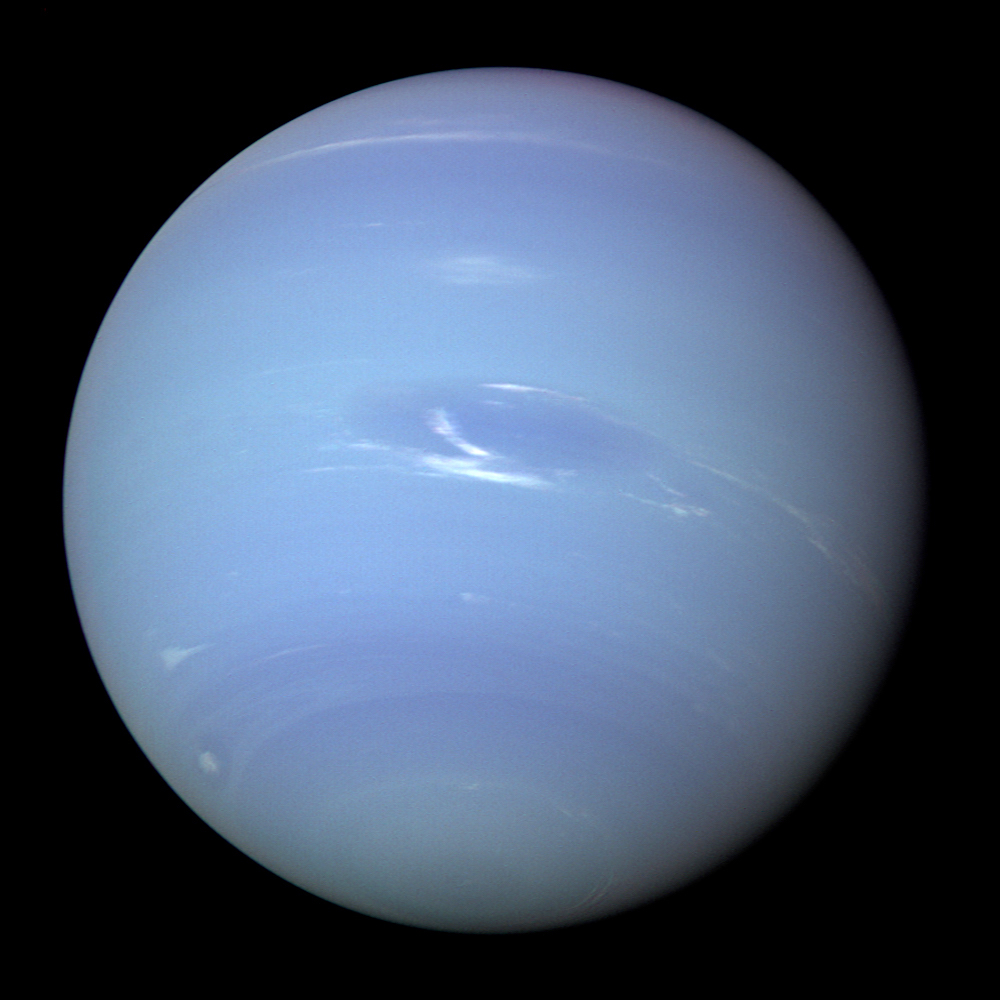
Colour recalibrated in 2016 (Justin Cowart), preserving some enhancement for contrast

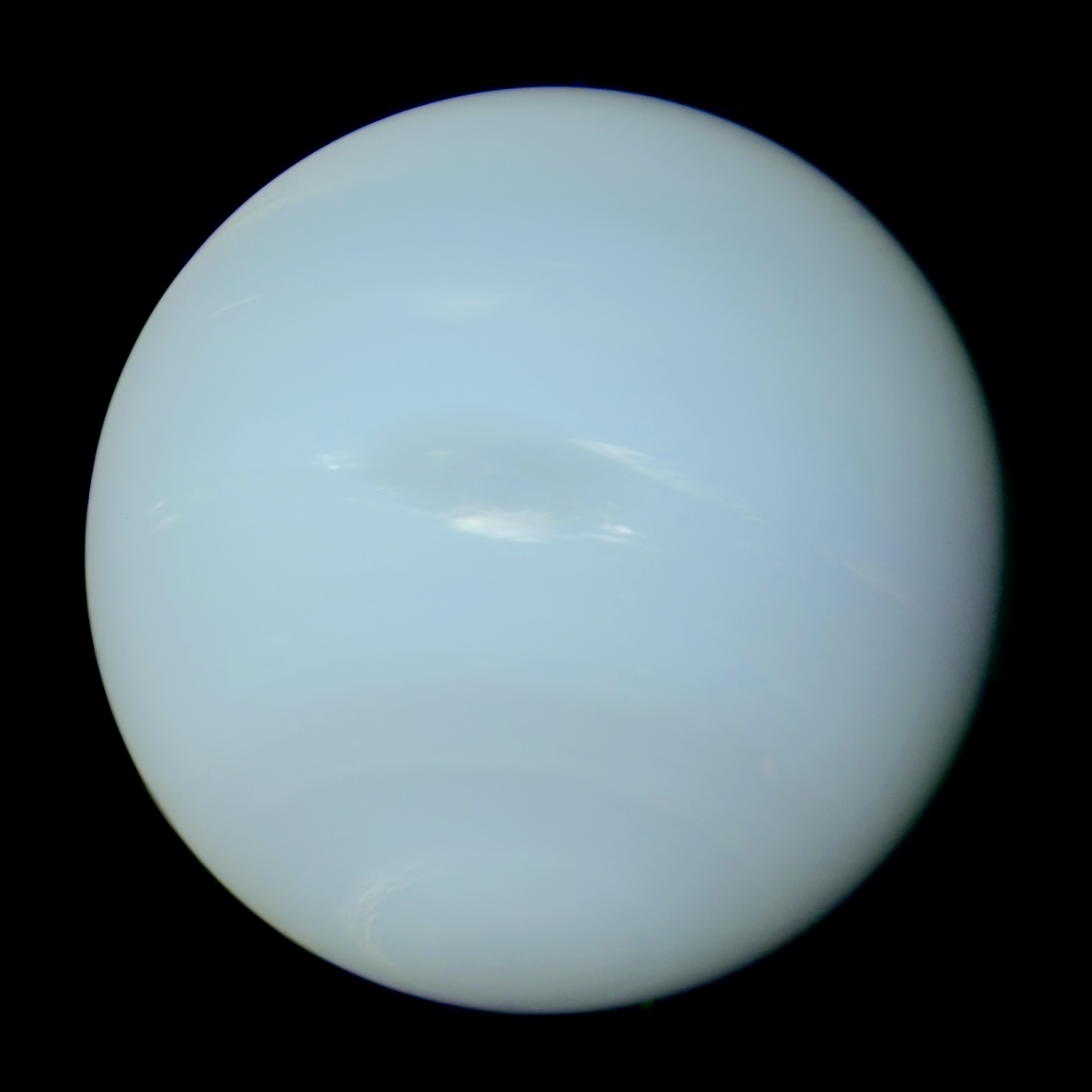
Colour recalibrated in 2023 (Patrick Irwin), approximating the true colour

== Atmosphere ==
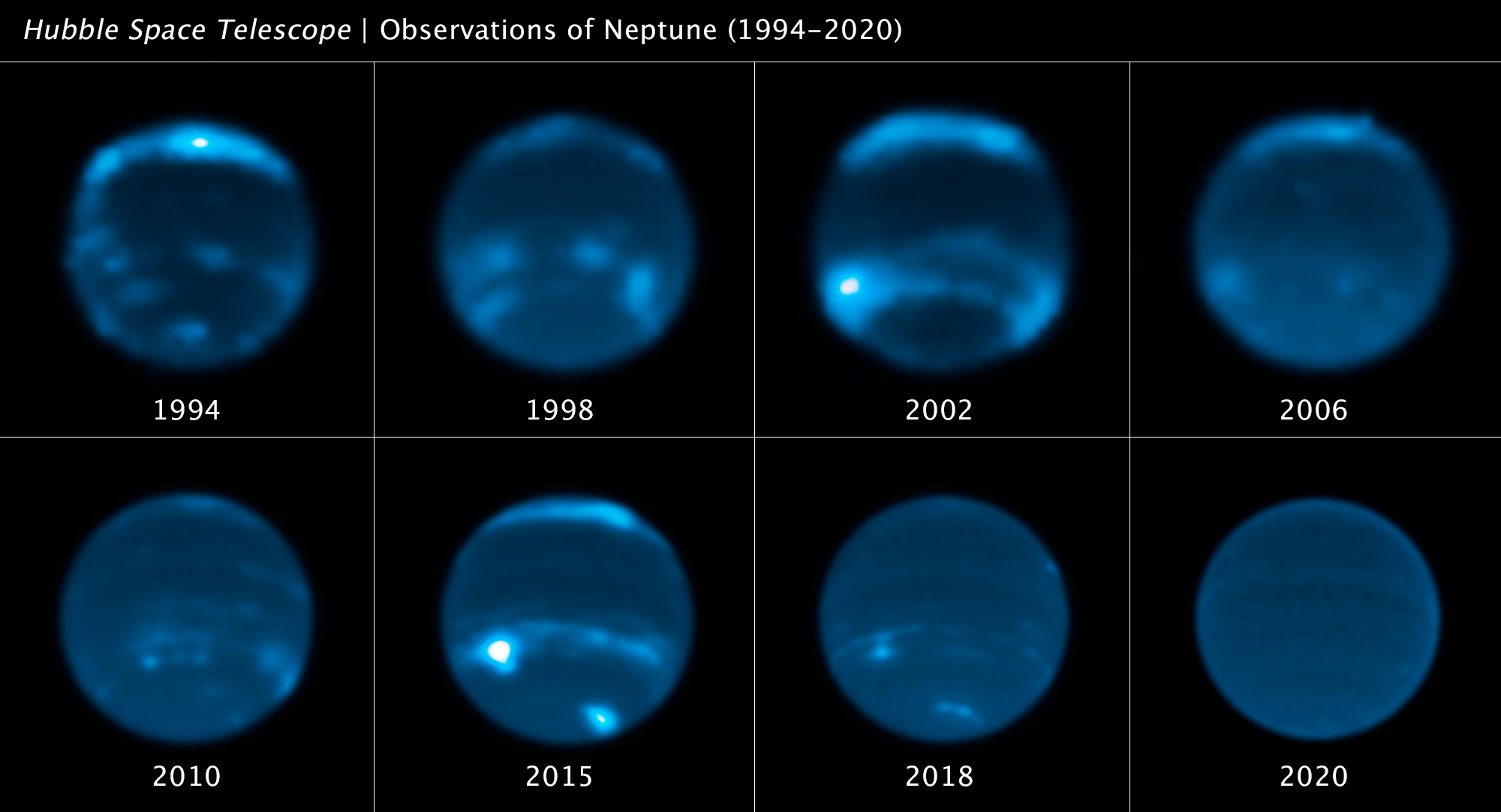
Neptune's cloud cover from 1994 to 2020. False colour image based on data from WFPC2 and WFC3 instruments of the Hubble Space Telescope.

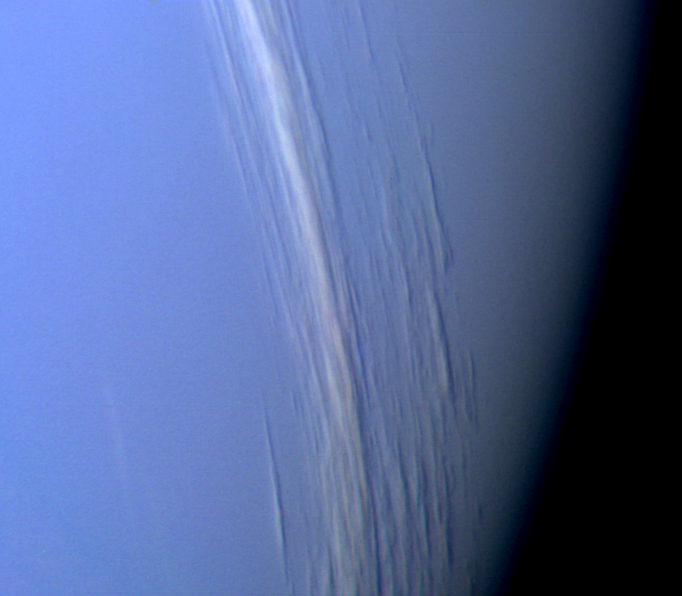
Bands of high-altitude clouds cast shadows on Neptune's lower cloud deck. The colour is exaggerated to show the clouds more clearly.

At high altitudes, Neptune's atmosphere is 80% hydrogen and 19% helium. A trace amount of methane is present. Prominent absorption bands of methane exist at wavelengths above 600 nm, in the red and infrared portion of the spectrum. As with Uranus, this absorption of red light by atmospheric methane is part of what gives Neptune its faint blue hue, which is more pronounced for Neptune due to concentrated haze in Uranus's atmosphere.

Neptune's atmosphere is subdivided into two main regions: the lower troposphere, where temperature decreases with altitude, and the stratosphere, where temperature increases with altitude. The boundary between the two, the tropopause, lies at a pressure of 0.1 bars (10 kPa). The stratosphere then gives way to the thermosphere at a pressure lower than 10^{−5} to 10^{−4} bars (1 to 10 Pa). The thermosphere gradually transitions to the exosphere.

Models suggest that Neptune's troposphere is banded by clouds of varying compositions depending on altitude. The upper-level clouds lie at pressures below one bar, where the temperature is suitable for methane to condense. For pressures between one and five bars (100 and 500 kPa), clouds of ammonia and hydrogen sulfide are thought to form. Above a pressure of five bars, the clouds may consist of ammonia, ammonium sulfide, hydrogen sulfide and water. Deeper clouds of water ice should be found at pressures of about 50 bars (5.0 MPa), where the temperature reaches 273 K (0 °C; 32 °F). Underneath, clouds of ammonia and hydrogen sulfide may be found.

High-altitude clouds on Neptune have been observed casting shadows on the opaque cloud deck below. There are high-altitude cloud bands that wrap around the planet at constant latitudes. These circumferential bands have widths of 50–150 km and lie about 50–110 km above the cloud deck. These altitudes are in the layer where weather occurs, the troposphere. Weather does not occur in the higher stratosphere or thermosphere. In August 2023, the high-altitude clouds of Neptune vanished, prompting reference to a study spanning thirty years of observations by the Hubble Space Telescope and ground-based telescopes. The study found that Neptune's high-altitude cloud activity is bound to Solar cycles, and not to the planet's seasons.

Neptune's spectra suggest that its lower stratosphere is hazy due to condensation of products of ultraviolet photolysis of methane, such as ethane and ethyne. The stratosphere is home to trace amounts of carbon monoxide and hydrogen cyanide. The stratosphere of Neptune is warmer than that of Uranus due to the elevated concentration of hydrocarbons.

For reasons that remain obscure, the planet's thermosphere is at an anomalously high temperature of about 750 K (477 °C; 890 °F). The planet is too far from the Sun for this heat to be generated by ultraviolet radiation. One candidate for a heating mechanism is atmospheric interaction with ions in the planet's magnetic field. Other candidates are gravity waves from the interior that dissipate in the atmosphere. The first observation of $\ce{H3+}$ in Neptune's ionosphere, co-located with the thermosphere, also lead to the first temperature measurement of Neptune's thermosphere since Voyager 2 of 450 K; thus, Neptune is experiencing an unexplained, extreme cooling trend of ~10 K per year. This cooling trend is also occurring in Uranus' upper atmosphere and is much better documented. The thermosphere contains traces of carbon dioxide and water, which may have been deposited from external sources such as meteorites and dust.

=== Climate ===
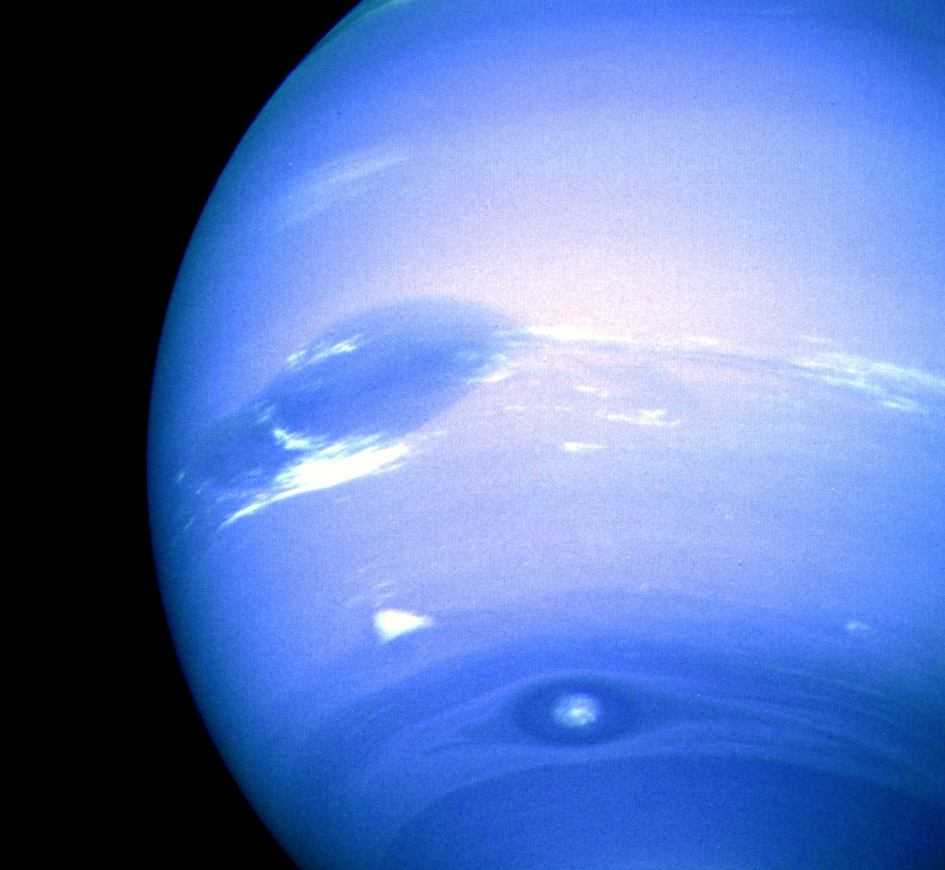
The Great Dark Spot (top), Scooter (middle white cloud), and the Small Dark Spot (bottom), with contrast exaggerated

Neptune's weather is characterized by extremely dynamic storm systems, with winds reaching speeds of almost 600 m/s (2,200 km/h; 1,300 mph)—exceeding supersonic flow. More typically, by tracking the motion of persistent clouds, wind speeds have been shown to vary from 20 m/s in the easterly direction to 325 m/s westward. At the cloud tops, the prevailing winds range in speed from 400 m/s along the equator to 250 m/s at the poles. Most of the winds on Neptune move in a direction opposite the planet's rotation. The general pattern of winds showed prograde rotation at high latitudes vs. retrograde rotation at lower latitudes. The difference in flow direction is thought to be a "skin effect" and not due to any deeper atmospheric processes. At 70°S latitude, a high-speed jet travels at a speed of 300 m/s. Due to seasonal changes, the cloud bands in the southern hemisphere of Neptune have been observed to increase in size and albedo. This trend was first seen in 1980. The long orbital period of Neptune results in seasons lasting 40 Earth years.

Neptune differs from Uranus in its typical level of meteorological activity. Voyager 2 observed weather phenomena on Neptune during its 1989 flyby, but no comparable phenomena on Uranus during its 1986 flyby.

The abundance of methane, ethane and acetylene at Neptune's equator is 10–100 times greater than at the poles. This is interpreted as evidence for upwelling at the equator and subsidence near the poles, as photochemistry cannot account for the distribution without meridional circulation.

In 2007, it was discovered that the upper troposphere of Neptune's south pole was about 10 K warmer than the rest of its atmosphere, which averages about 73 K (−200 °C). The temperature differential is enough to let methane, which elsewhere is frozen in the troposphere, escape into the stratosphere near the pole. The relative "hot spot" is due to Neptune's axial tilt, which has exposed the south pole to the Sun for the last quarter of Neptune's year, or roughly 40 Earth years. As Neptune slowly moves towards the opposite side of the Sun, the south pole will be darkened and the north pole illuminated, causing the methane release to shift to the north pole.

==== Storms ====
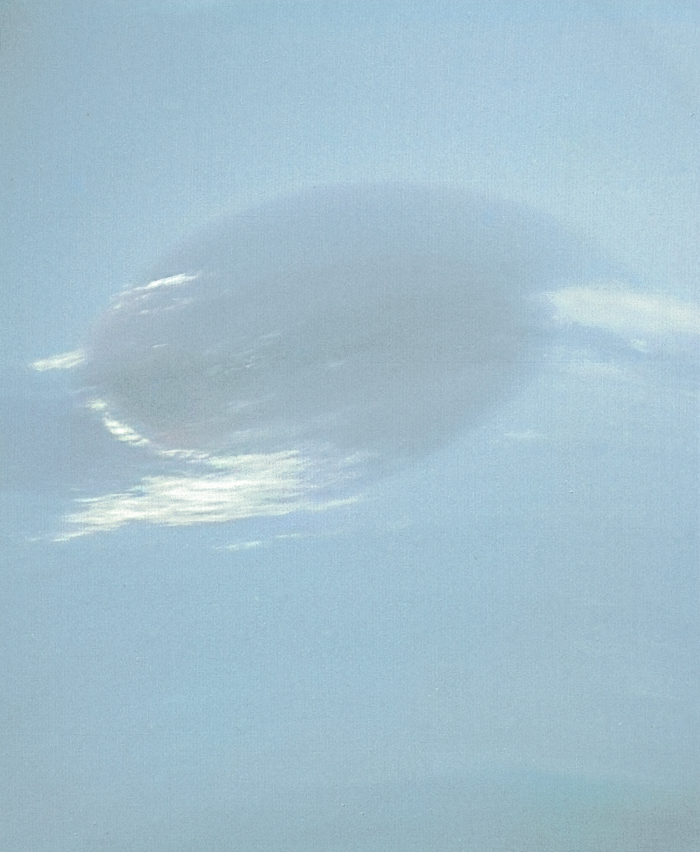
The Great Dark Spot imaged by Voyager 2

In 1989, the Great Dark Spot, an anticyclonic storm system spanning 13,000 km × 6,600 km (8,100 mi × 4,100 mi), was discovered by NASA's Voyager 2 spacecraft. The storm resembled the Great Red Spot of Jupiter. Some five years later, on 2 November 1994, the Hubble Space Telescope did not see the Great Dark Spot on the planet. Instead, a new storm similar to the Great Dark Spot was found in Neptune's northern hemisphere.

The Scooter is another storm, a white cloud group farther south than the Great Dark Spot. This nickname first arose during the months leading up to the Voyager 2 encounter in 1989, when they were observed moving at speeds faster than the Great Dark Spot (and images acquired later would subsequently reveal the presence of clouds moving even faster than those that had initially been detected by Voyager 2). The Small Dark Spot is a southern cyclonic storm, the second-most-intense storm observed during the 1989 encounter. It was initially completely dark, but as Voyager 2 approached the planet, a bright core developed, which can be seen in most of the highest-resolution images. In 2018, a newer main dark spot and smaller dark spot were identified and studied. In 2023, the first ground-based observation of a dark spot on Neptune was announced.

The Northern Great Dark Spot imaged by Hubble in 2018

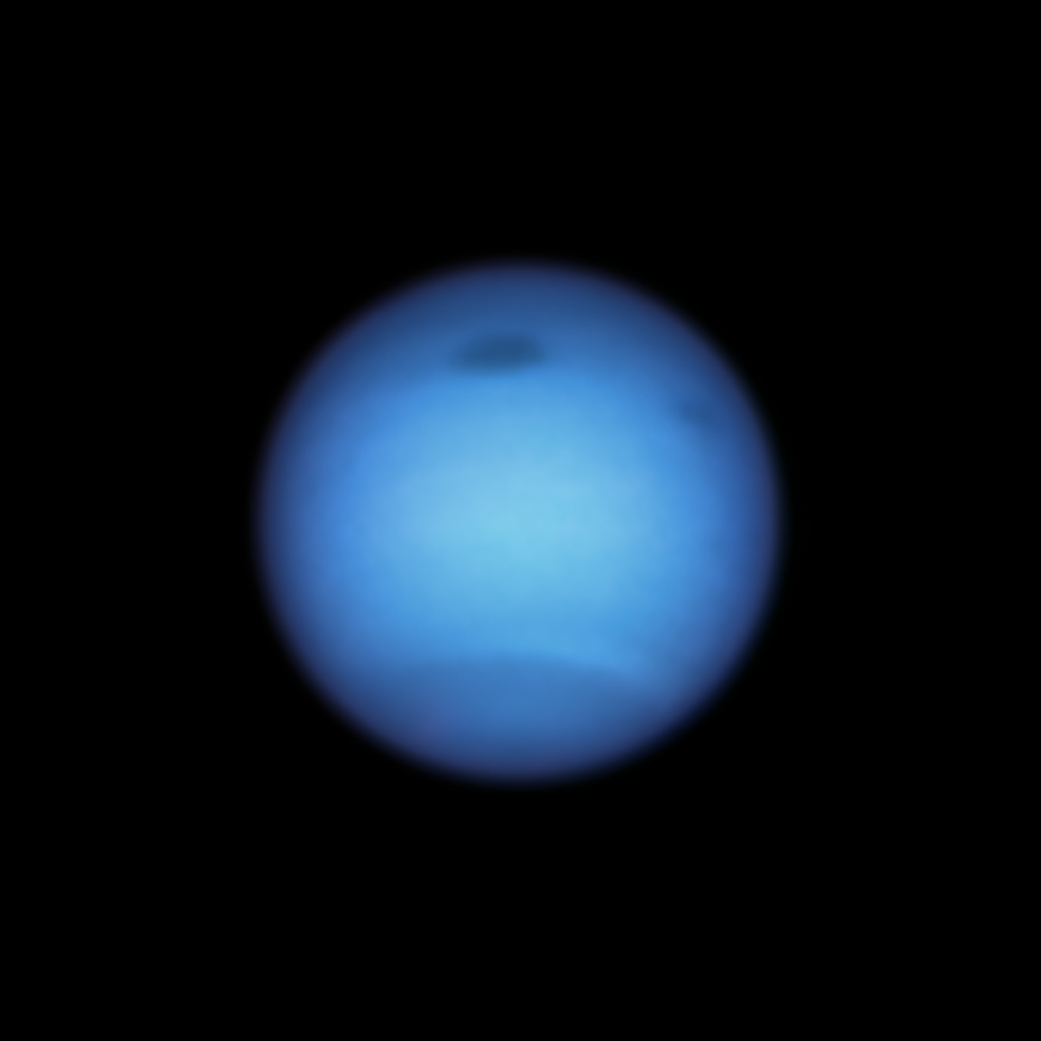
The Northern Great Dark Spot and a smaller companion storm imaged by Hubble in 2020

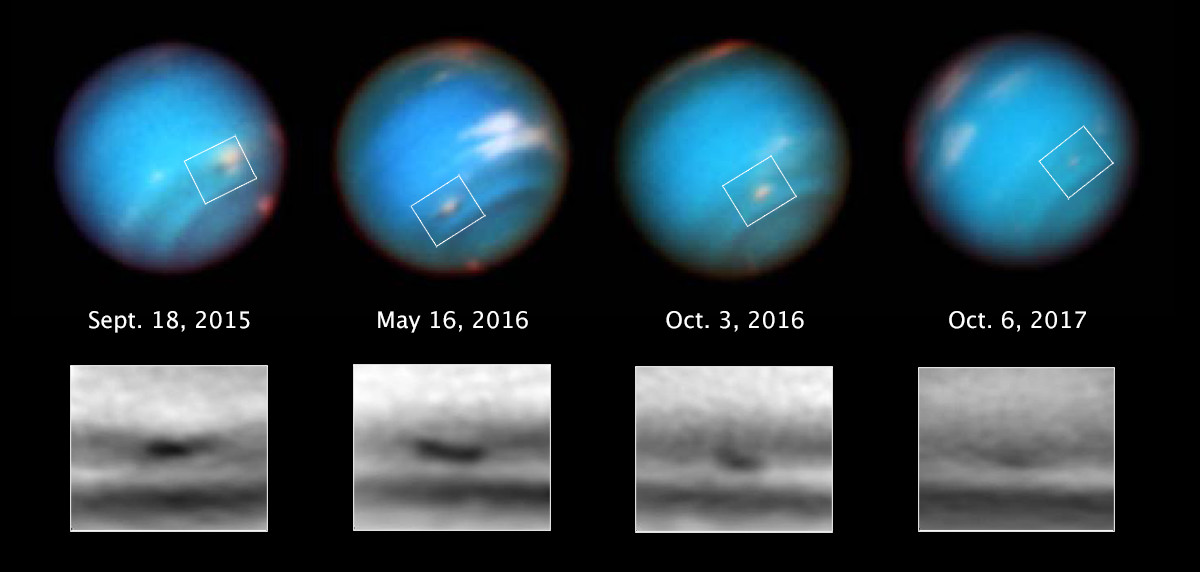
Neptune's SDS-2015 (Note: SDS-2015 meant that it was a Southern Dark Spot that was discovered in 2015.) vortex in around two years, which has appeared to be shrinking and disappearing

Neptune's dark spots are thought to occur in the troposphere at lower altitudes than the brighter cloud features, so they appear as holes in the upper cloud decks. As they are stable features that can persist for several months, they are thought to be vortex structures. Often associated with dark spots are brighter, persistent methane clouds that form around the tropopause layer. The persistence of companion clouds shows that some former dark spots may continue to exist as cyclones even though they are no longer visible as a dark feature. Dark spots may dissipate when they migrate too close to the equator or possibly through some other, unknown mechanism.

In 1989, Voyager 2's Planetary Radio Astronomy (PRA) experiment observed around 60 lightning flashes, or Neptunian electrostatic discharges emitting energies over 7×10^{8} J. A plasma wave system (PWS) detected 16 electromagnetic wave events with a frequency range of 50–12 kHz at magnetic latitudes 7–33˚. These plasma wave detections were possibly triggered by lightning over 20 minutes in the ammonia clouds of the magnetosphere.

During Voyager 2's closest approach to Neptune, the PWS instrument provided Neptune's first plasma wave detections at a sample rate of 28,800 samples per second. The measured plasma densities range from 10^{−3} to 10^{−1} cm^{3}. Neptunian lightning may occur in three cloud layers, with microphysical modelling suggesting that most of these occurrences happen in the water clouds of the troposphere or the shallow ammonia clouds of the magnetosphere. Neptune is predicted to have 1/19 the lightning flash rate of Jupiter and to display most of its lightning activity at high latitudes. However, lightning on Neptune seems to resemble lightning on Earth rather than Jovian lightning.

== Orbital motion and observation ==
Neptune (red arc) completes one orbit around the Sun (centre) for every 164.79 orbits of Earth. The light blue dot represents Uranus.

The average distance between Neptune and the Sun is 4.5 billion km (about 30.1 astronomical units (AU), the mean distance from the Earth to the Sun), and it completes an orbit on average every 164.79 years, subject to a variability of around ±0.1 years. The perihelion distance is 29.81 AU, and the aphelion distance is 30.33 AU. (Note: The last three aphelia were 30.33 AU, the next is 30.34 AU. The perihelia are even more stable at 29.81 AU.) Neptune's orbital eccentricity is only 0.008678, making it the planet in the Solar System with the second most circular orbit after Venus. The orbit of Neptune is inclined 1.77° compared to that of Earth.

On 11 July 2011, Neptune completed its first full barycentric orbit since its discovery in 1846; it did not appear at its exact discovery position in the sky because Earth was in a different location in its 365.26-day orbit. Because of the motion of the Sun in relation to the barycentre of the Solar System, on 11 July, Neptune was not at its exact discovery position in relation to the Sun—if the more common heliocentric coordinate system is used, the discovery longitude was reached on 12 July 2011.

=== Observation ===
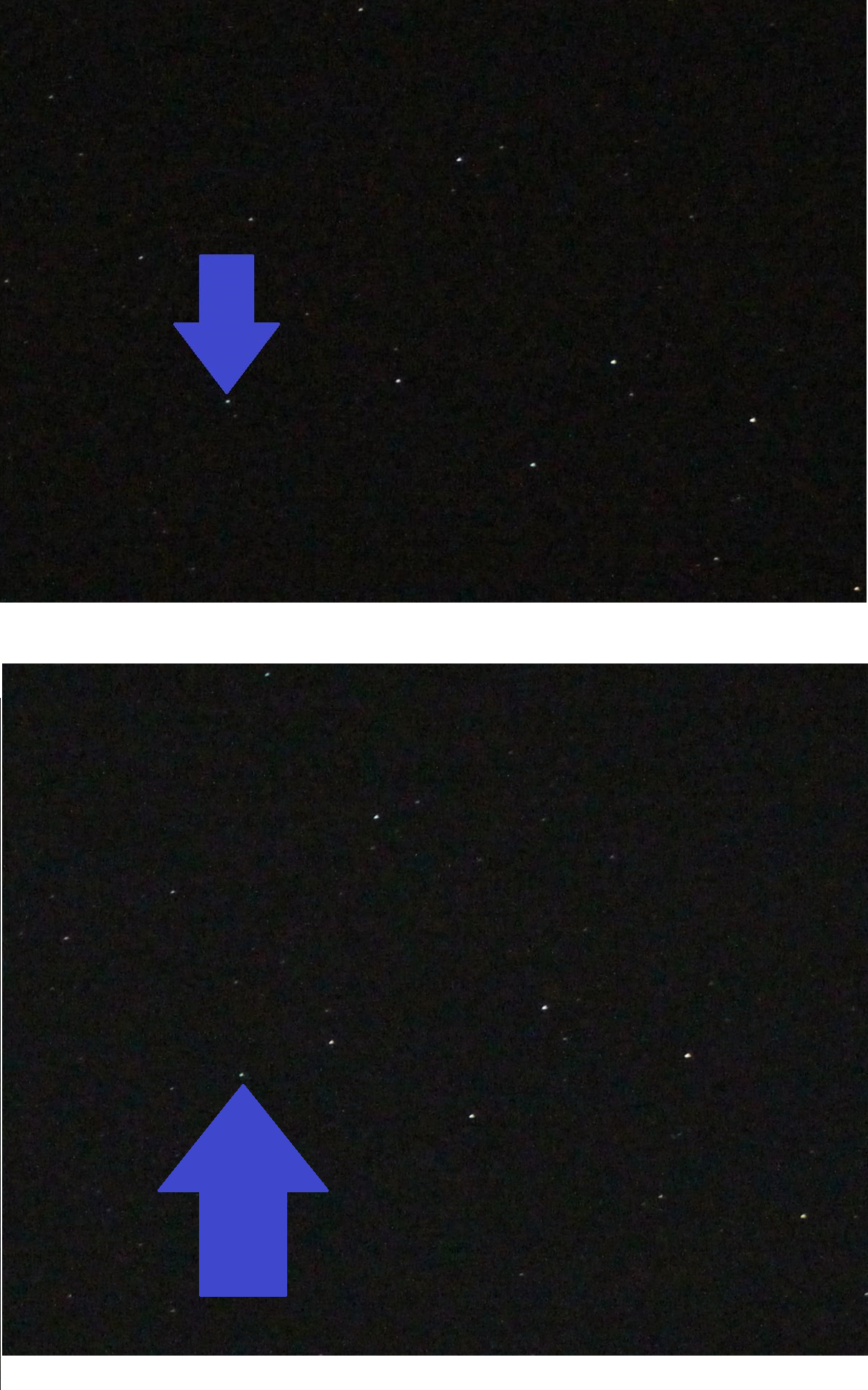
Movement of Neptune in front of the stars of Aquarius in 2022

Neptune is too faint to be visible to the naked eye. The apparent magnitude currently ranges from 7.67 to 7.89 with a mean of 7.78 and a standard deviation of 0.06. It can be outshone by Jupiter's Galilean moons, the dwarf planet Ceres and the asteroids 4 Vesta, 2 Pallas, 7 Iris, 3 Juno, and 6 Hebe. A telescope or strong binoculars will resolve Neptune as a small blue disk, similar in appearance to Uranus. Neptune brightened about 10% between 1980 and 2000 mostly due to the changing of the seasons. Neptune may continue to brighten as it approaches perihelion in 2042. Prior to 1980, the planet was as faint as magnitude 8.0.

Because of the distance of Neptune from Earth, its angular diameter only ranges from 2.2 to 2.4 arcseconds, the smallest of the Solar System planets. Its small apparent size makes it challenging to study visually. Telescopic data were limited until the advent of the Hubble Space Telescope and large ground-based telescopes with adaptive optics (AO). In 1977, for example, even the rotation period of Neptune remained uncertain. Ground-based observations using adaptive optics were first successfully carried out in 1997 in Hawaii. Neptune is currently approaching perihelion (closest approach to the Sun) and has been shown to be heating up, with increased atmospheric activity and brightness as a consequence. The new technologies are recording increasingly detailed images of Neptune. Both Hubble and the adaptive-optics telescopes have made discoveries since the mid-1990s, including an increase in the number of known satellites around the outer planets. In 2004 and 2005, five new small satellites of Neptune with diameters between 38 and 61 kilometres were discovered.

From Earth, Neptune goes through apparent retrograde motion every 367 days, resulting in a looping motion against the background stars during each opposition. These loops carried it close to the 1846 discovery coordinates in April and July 2010 and again in October and November 2011.

Neptune's 164-year orbital period means that the planet takes an average of 13 years to move through each constellation of the zodiac. In 2011, it completed its first full orbit of the Sun since being discovered and returned to where it was first spotted northeast of Iota Aquarii.

Observation of Neptune in the radio-frequency band shows that it is a source of both continuous emission and irregular bursts. Both sources are thought to originate from its rotating magnetic field. In the infrared part of the spectrum, Neptune's storms appear bright against the cooler background, allowing the size and shape of these features to be readily tracked.

== Satellite system and resonance ==
=== Planetary rings ===
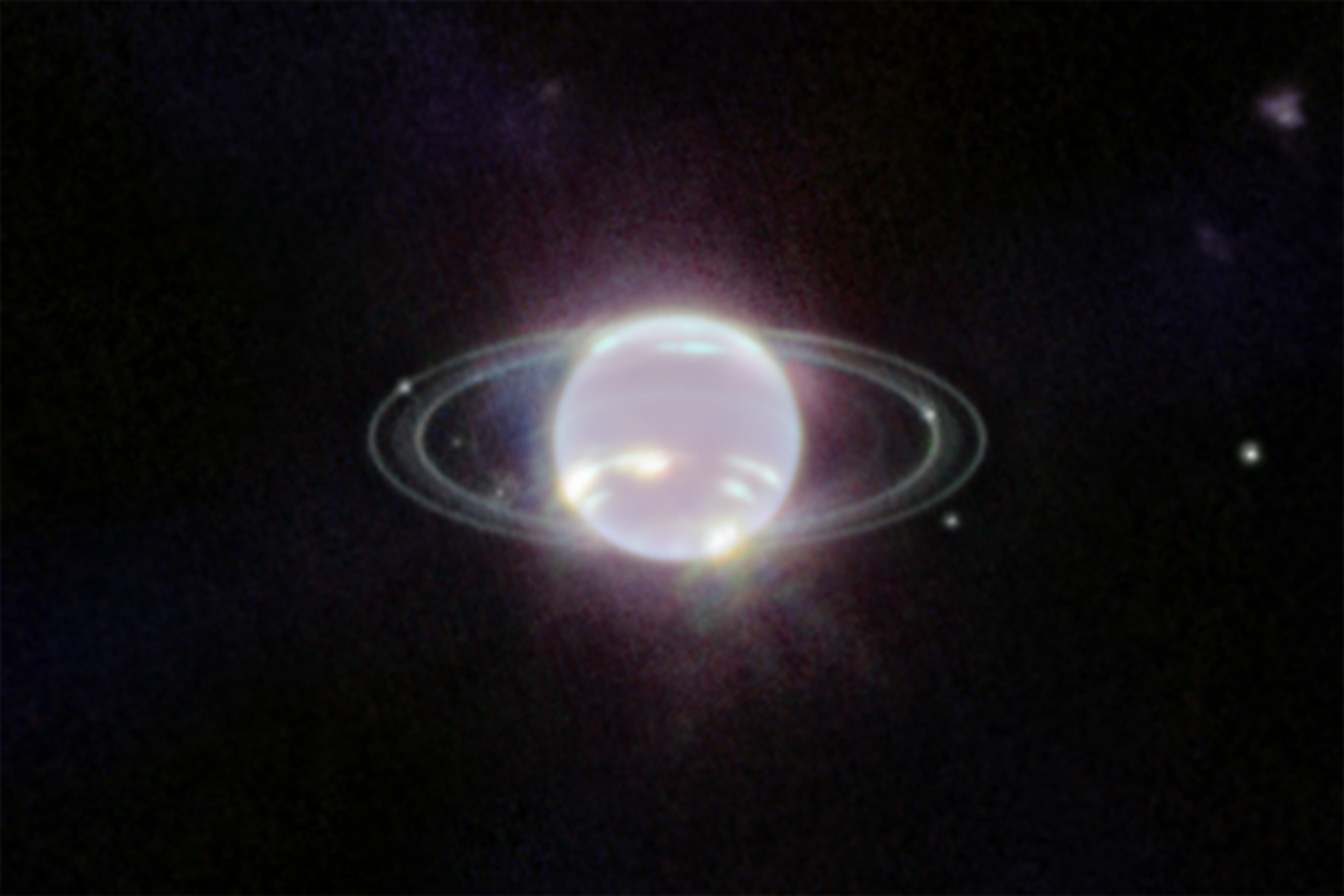
Neptune's rings and moons viewed in infrared by the James Webb Space Telescope, in 2022.

Neptune has a planetary ring system, though one much less substantial than that of Saturn and Uranus. The rings may consist of ice particles coated with silicates or carbon-based material, which most likely gives them a reddish hue. The three main rings are the narrow Adams Ring, 63,000 km from the centre of Neptune, the Le Verrier Ring, at 53,000 km, and the broader, fainter Galle Ring, at 42,000 km. A faint outward extension to the Le Verrier Ring has been named Lassell; it is bounded at its outer edge by the Arago Ring at 57,000 km.

The first of these planetary rings was detected in 1968 by a team led by Edward Guinan. In the early 1980s, analysis of this data along with newer observations led to the hypothesis that this ring might be incomplete. Evidence that the rings might have gaps first arose during a stellar occultation in 1984 when the rings obscured a star on immersion but not on emersion. Images from Voyager 2 in 1989 settled the issue by showing several faint rings.

The outermost ring, Adams, contains five prominent arcs now named Courage, Liberté, Egalité 1, Egalité 2 and Fraternité (Courage, Liberty, Equality and Fraternity). The existence of arcs was difficult to explain because the laws of motion would predict that arcs would spread out into a uniform ring over short timescales. Astronomers now estimate that the arcs are corralled into their current form by the gravitational effects of Galatea, a moon just inward from the ring.

Earth-based observations announced in 2005 appeared to show that Neptune's rings were much more unstable than previously thought. Images taken from the W. M. Keck Observatory in 2002 and 2003 show considerable decay in the rings when compared to images by Voyager 2. In particular, it seems that the Liberté arc might disappear in as little as one century.

=== Moons ===
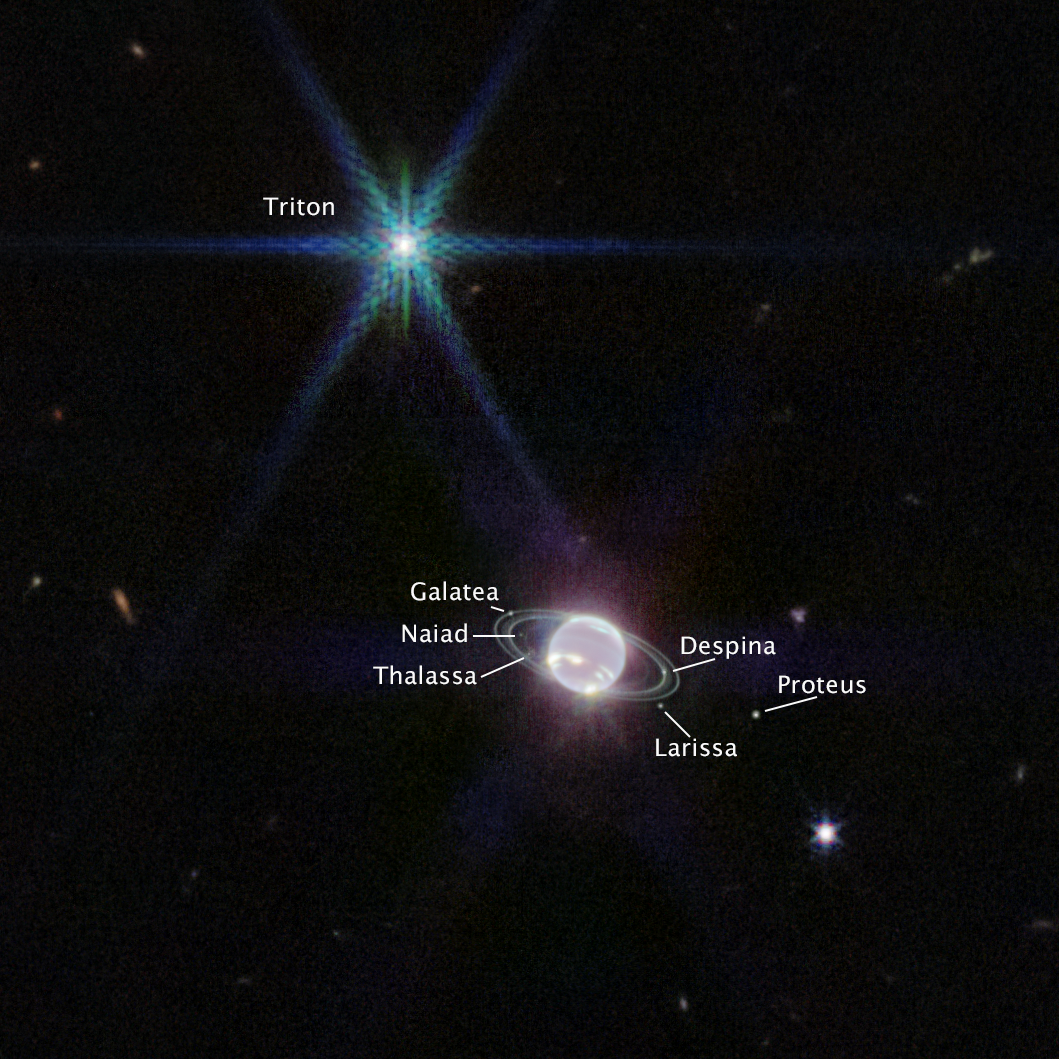
An annotated picture of Neptune's many moons as captured by the James Webb Space Telescope. The bright blue diffraction star is Triton, Neptune's largest moon.

Neptunian natural satellite system size comparison

Neptune has 16 known moons. Triton is the largest Neptunian moon, accounting for more than 99.5% of the mass in orbit around Neptune, (Note: Mass of Triton: 2.14×10^{22} kg. Combined mass of 12 other known moons of Neptune: 7.53×10^{19} kg, or 0.35%. The mass of the rings is negligible.) and is the only one massive enough to be spheroidal. Triton was discovered by William Lassell just 17 days after the discovery of Neptune itself. Unlike all other large planetary moons in the Solar System, Triton has a retrograde orbit, indicating that it was captured rather than forming in place; it was probably once a dwarf planet in the Kuiper belt. It is close enough to Neptune to be locked into a synchronous rotation, and it is slowly spiralling inward because of tidal acceleration. It will eventually be torn apart, in about 28 billion years, when it reaches the Roche limit. In 1989, Triton was the coldest object that had yet been measured in the Solar System, with estimated temperatures of 38 K (−235 °C). This low temperature is due to Triton's high albedo which causes it to reflect a lot of sunlight instead of absorbing it.

Neptune's second-known satellite (by order of discovery), the irregular moon Nereid, has one of the most eccentric orbits of any satellite in the Solar System. The eccentricity of 0.7512 gives it an apoapsis that is seven times its periapsis distance from Neptune. (Note: $\tfrac{r_{a}}{r_{p}} = \tfrac{2}{1-e} - 1 = 2/0.2488 - 1 \approx 7.039.$)

From July to September 1989, Voyager 2 discovered six moons of Neptune. Of these, the irregularly shaped Proteus is notable for being as large as a body of its density can be without being pulled into a spherical shape by its own gravity. Although the second-most-massive Neptunian moon, it is only 0.25% the mass of Triton. Neptune's innermost four moons—Naiad, Thalassa, Despina and Galatea—orbit close enough to be within Neptune's rings. The next-farthest out, Larissa, was originally discovered in 1981 when it had occulted a star. This occultation had been attributed to ring arcs, but when Voyager 2 observed Neptune in 1989, Larissa was found to have caused it. Five new irregular moons discovered between 2002 and 2003 were announced in 2004. A new moon and the second-smallest yet, Hippocamp, was found in 2013 by combining multiple Hubble images. Because Neptune was the Roman god of the sea, Neptune's moons have been named after lesser sea gods.

=== Orbital resonances ===
A diagram showing the major orbital resonances in the Kuiper belt caused by Neptune: the highlighted regions are the 2:3 resonance (plutinos), the nonresonant "classical belt" (cubewanos), and the 1:2 resonance (twotinos).

Neptune's orbit has a profound impact on the region directly beyond it, known as the Kuiper belt. The Kuiper belt is a ring of small icy worlds, similar to the asteroid belt but far larger, extending from Neptune's orbit at 30 AU out to about 55 AU from the Sun. Much in the same way that Jupiter's gravity dominates the asteroid belt, Neptune's gravity dominates the Kuiper belt. Over the age of the Solar System, certain regions of the Kuiper belt became destabilized by Neptune's gravity, creating gaps in its structure. The region between 40 and 42 AU is an example.

There do exist orbits within these empty regions where objects can survive for the age of the Solar System. These resonances occur when Neptune's orbital period is a precise fraction of that of the object, such as 1:2, or 3:4. If, say, an object orbits the Sun once for every two Neptune orbits, it will only complete half an orbit by the time Neptune returns to its original position. The most heavily populated resonance in the Kuiper belt, with over 200 known objects, is the 2:3 resonance. Objects in this resonance complete 2 orbits for every 3 of Neptune, and are known as plutinos because the largest of the known Kuiper belt objects, Pluto, is among them. Although Pluto crosses Neptune's orbit regularly, the 2:3 resonance makes it so that they can never collide. The 3:4, 3:5, 4:7 and 2:5 resonances are less populated.

Neptune has a number of known trojan objects occupying both the Sun–Neptune L_{4} and L_{5} Lagrangian points—gravitationally stable regions leading and trailing Neptune in its orbit, respectively. Neptune trojans can be viewed as being in a 1:1 resonance with Neptune. Some Neptune trojans are remarkably stable in their orbits, and are likely to have formed alongside Neptune rather than being captured. The first object identified as associated with Neptune's trailing L_{5} Lagrangian point was 2008 LC18. Neptune has a temporary quasi-satellite, (309239) 2007 RW10. The object has been a quasi-satellite of Neptune for about 12,500 years and it will remain in that dynamical state for another 12,500 years.

== Exploration ==
An animation of Voyager 2's trajectory from 20 August 1977 to 30 December 2000 Voyager 2 Voyager 2 · Earth · Jupiter · Saturn · Uranus · Neptune · Sun

Voyager 2 is the only spacecraft that has visited Neptune. The spacecraft's closest approach to the planet occurred on 25 August 1989. Because this was the last major planet the spacecraft could visit, it was decided to make a close flyby of the moon Triton, regardless of the consequences to the trajectory, similarly to what was done for Voyager 1's encounter with Saturn and its moon Titan. The images relayed to Earth from Voyager 2 became the basis of a 1989 PBS all-night program, Neptune All Night.

During the encounter, signals from the spacecraft required 246 minutes to reach Earth. Hence, for the most part, Voyager 2's mission relied on planned commands for the Neptune encounter. The spacecraft performed a distant encounter with the moon Nereid before it came within 4,400 km of Neptune's atmosphere on 25 August, then passed close to the planet's largest moon Triton later the same day.

The spacecraft verified the existence of a magnetic field surrounding the planet and discovered that the field was offset from the centre and tilted in a manner similar to the field around Uranus. Neptune's rotation period was determined using measurements of radio emissions and Voyager 2 showed that Neptune had a surprisingly active weather system. Six new moons were discovered, and the planet was shown to have more than one ring. The flyby provided the first accurate measurement of Neptune's mass which was found to be 0.5 per cent less than had been calculated. The new figure disproved the hypothesis that an undiscovered Planet X acted upon the orbits of Neptune and Uranus.

Since 2018, the China National Space Administration has been studying a concept for a pair of Voyager-like interstellar probes tentatively known as Shensuo. Both probes would be launched in the 2020s and take differing paths to explore opposing ends of the heliosphere; the second probe, IHP-2, would fly by Neptune in January 2038, passing only 1,000 km above the cloud tops, and potentially carry an atmospheric impactor to be released during its approach. Afterwards, it will continue its mission throughout the Kuiper belt toward the heliosphere tail, which is so far unexplored.

After Voyager 2 and IHP-2's flybys, the next step in scientific exploration of the Neptunian system is considered to be an orbital mission; most proposals have been by NASA, most often for a Flagship orbiter. In 2003, there was a proposal in NASA's "Vision Missions Studies" for a "Neptune Orbiter with Probes" mission that does Cassini-level science. A subsequent proposal, that was not selected, was for Argo, a flyby spacecraft to be launched in 2019, that would visit Jupiter, Saturn, Neptune, and a Kuiper belt object. The focus would have been on Neptune and its largest moon Triton to be investigated around 2029.

The proposed New Horizons 2 mission might have done a close flyby of the Neptunian system, but it was later scrapped. A proposal for the Discovery Program is that the Trident spacecraft would conduct a flyby of Neptune and Triton; however, the mission was not selected for Discovery 15 or 16. Neptune Odyssey is another concept for a Neptune orbiter and atmospheric probe that was studied as a possible large strategic science mission by NASA; it would have launched between 2031 and 2033, and arrive at Neptune by 2049. However, for logistical reasons the Uranus Orbiter and Probe mission was selected as the ice giant orbiter mission recommendation, with top priority ahead of the Enceladus Orbilander.

Two notable proposals for a Triton-focused Neptune orbiter mission that would be costed right between the Trident and Odyssey missions (under the New Frontiers program) are Triton Ocean World Surveyor and Nautilus, with cruise stages taking place in the 2031–47 and 2041–56 time periods, respectively. Neptune is a potential target for China's Tianwen-5, which could arrive in 2058.

== See also ==
- Outline of Neptune
- Hot Neptune
- Neptune in astrology
- Neptune in fiction
- Neptunium
- Neptune, the Mystic – one of the seven movements in Gustav Holst's Planets suite
- Timeline of the far future
- Stats of planets in the Solar System

== Bibliography ==
- Burgess, Eric (1991). Far Encounter: The Neptune System. New York: Columbia University Press. ISBN 978-0-231-07412-4.
- Moore, Patrick (2000). The Data Book of Astronomy. Baton Rouge: Taylor & Francis Group. ISBN 978-0-7503-0620-1.
