= Sylvia Brownrigg =

American author (born 1964)

- Born: Sylvia Alderyn Brownrigg; December 16, 1964 (age 61); Mountain View, California, U.S.
- Education: Yale University; Johns Hopkins University (MA)
- Occupation: Author
- Spouse: Sedge Thomson (separated)
- Children: 2
- Writing career
- Genre: Fiction
- Notable awards: Lambda Literary Award for Lesbian Fiction (2002)
- Website: sylviabrownrigg.com

Sylvia Alderyn Brownrigg (born December 16, 1964) is an American author. She is the author of seven books of fiction and a family memoir. Brownrigg's books have been on The New York Times notable fiction lists and Los Angeles Times and Kirkus books of the year. Her children's book, Kepler's Dream, published under the name Juliet Bell, was turned into an independent film in 2017. She won a Lambda Literary Award in 2002 for Pages for You and published the sequel to that book in 2017. Brownrigg's reviews and criticism have appeared in a wide range of publications, including The New York Times Book Review, The Times Literary Supplement, The Guardian, New Statesman, Los Angeles Times, and The Believer.

== Life ==
Brownrigg was born in Mountain View, California. She grew up in Los Altos, California, and Oxford, England. After graduating magna cum laude at Yale University, Brownrigg earned a Master of Arts degree in writing from Johns Hopkins University. From 1993 until 2000, she lived in London.

Brownrigg is separated from radio show host Sedge Thomson, and now lives in Berkeley, California, with their son and daughter.

== Bibliography ==
- The Metaphysical Touch. New York: Farrar, Straus, and Giroux. 1999. ISBN 0-374-19965-5.
- Ten Women Who Shook the World. New York: Farrar, Straus, and Giroux. 2000. ISBN 0-374-27289-1.
- Pages for You. New York: Farrar, Straus, and Giroux. 2002. ISBN 0-374-22859-0.

- Geschrieben für Dich. Berlin: Verlag Krug & Schadenberg. 2005. ISBN 978-3-930041-45-9.

- The Delivery Room. London: Picador. 2006. ISBN 0-330-44242-2.
- Morality Tale. Berkeley: Publishers Group West. 2008. ISBN 978-1-58243-404-9.
- The Then Wives. Picador. 2008. ISBN 978-0-330-46098-9.
- Kepler's Dream. New York City: Penguin Group. 2012. ISBN 978-0-14-242648-7.
- Pages for Her. Berkeley: Counterpoint. 2017. ISBN 978-1-61902-933-0.
- The Whole Staggering Mystery. San Francisco: Catapult. 2024-04-23. ISBN 978-1-64009-657-8.

== Sources ==
- "California Births, 1905 - 1995" (Online Database). Family Tree Legends Records Collection. Pearl Street Software. 2002–2005.
- Brownrigg, Sylvia (2009). "Biography". Sylvia Brownrigg.com.
