= Discovery and exploration of the Solar System =

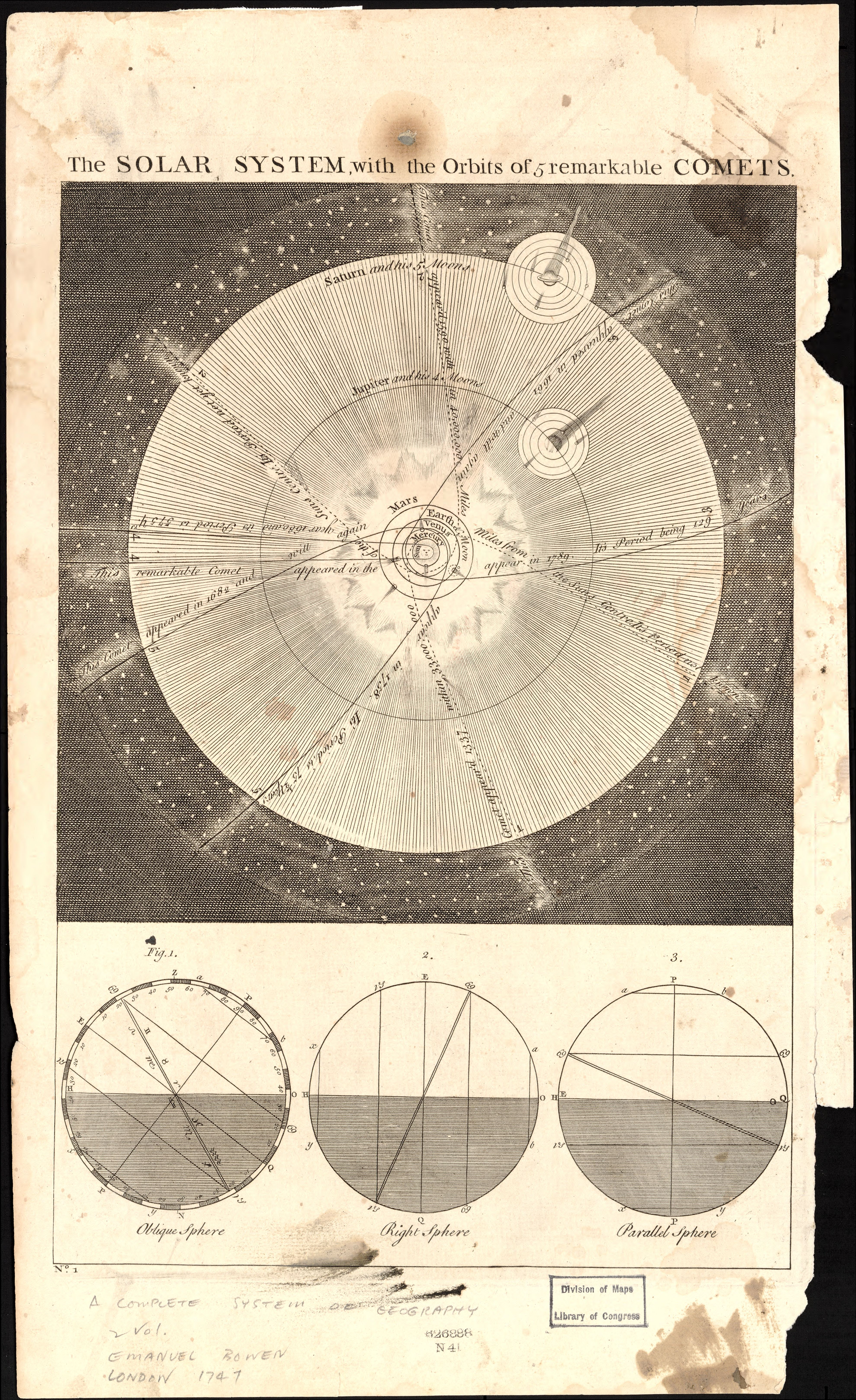
True-scale Solar System poster made by Emanuel Bowen in 1747. At that time, neither Uranus, Neptune, nor the asteroid belts had been discovered.

Discovery and exploration of the Solar System is observation, visitation, and increase in knowledge and understanding of Earth's "cosmic neighborhood". This includes the Sun, Earth and the Moon, the major planets Mercury, Venus, Mars, Jupiter, Saturn, Uranus, and Neptune, their satellites, as well as smaller bodies including comets, asteroids, and dust.

In ancient and medieval times, only objects visible to the naked eye—the Sun, the Moon, the five classical planets, and comets, along with phenomena now known to take place in Earth's atmosphere, like meteors and aurorae—were known. Ancient astronomers were able to make geometric observations with various instruments. The collection of precise observations in the early modern period and the invention of the telescope helped determine the overall structure of the Solar System. Telescopic observations resulted in the discovery of moons and rings around planets, and new planets, comets and the asteroids; the recognition of planets as other worlds, of Earth as another planet, and stars as other suns; the identification of the Solar System as an entity in itself, and the determination of the distances to some nearby stars.

For millennia, what today is known to be the Solar System was regarded as the "whole universe", so the knowledge of both mostly advanced in parallel. A clear distinction was not made until around the mid-17th century. Since then, incremental knowledge has been gained not only about the Solar System, but also about outer space and its deep-sky objects.

The composition of stars and planets was investigated with spectroscopy. Observations of Solar System bodies with other types of electromagnetic radiation became possible with radio astronomy, infrared astronomy, ultraviolet astronomy, X-ray astronomy, and gamma-ray astronomy.

Robotic space probes, the Apollo program landings of humans on the Moon, and space telescopes have vastly increased human knowledge about the atmosphere, geology, and electromagnetic properties of other planets, giving rise to the new field of planetary science.

The Solar System is one of many planetary systems in the galaxy. The planetary system that contains Earth is named the "Solar" System. The word "solar" is derived from the Latin word for Sun, Sol (genitive Solis). Anything related to the Sun is called "solar": for example, stellar wind from the Sun is called solar wind.

== Pre-telescope ==
Map of Anaximander's universe (circa 560 BCE)

The first humans had limited understanding of the celestial bodies that could be seen in the sky. The Sun, however, was of immediate interest, as it generates the day-night cycle. Also, dawn and sunset always appear at roughly the same points of the horizon, which helped to develop the cardinal directions. The Moon was another body of immediate interest, because of its larger apparent size. The lunar phases helped them measure time in longer periods than days, and to predict the duration of the seasons.

Prehistoric beliefs about the structure and origin of the universe were highly diverse, often rooted in religious cosmology, and many are unrecorded. Many associated the classical planets (star-like points visible with the naked eye) with deities, in part due to their puzzling forward and retrograde motion against the otherwise fixed stars, which gave them their nickname of "wanderer stars", πλάνητες ἀστέρες (planētes asteres) in Ancient Greek, from which today's word "planet" was derived.

Systematic astronomical observations were performed in many areas around the world, and started to inform cosmological knowledge, although they were mostly driven by astrological purposes such as divination and/or omens. Early historic civilizations in Egypt, the Levant, pre-Socratic Greece, Mesopotamia, and ancient China, recorded beliefs in a flat Earth. Vedic texts proposed a number of shapes, including a wheel (flat) and a bag (concave), though they likely promote a spherical Earth, which they refer to as bhugol (or भूगोल in Hindi and Sanskrit), which literally translates to "spherical land". Ancient models were typically geocentric, putting the Earth at the center of the universe, based solely on the common experience of seeing the skies slowly moving around above our heads, and by feeling the land under our feet to be firmly at rest. Some traditions in Chinese cosmology proposed an outer surface to which planets and the Sun and Moon were attached; another proposed that they were free-floating. All remaining stars were regarded as "fixed" in the background.

One important discovery made at different times in different places is that the bright planet sometimes seen near the sunrise (called Phosphorus by the Greeks) and the bright planet sometimes seen near the sunset (called Hesperus by the Greeks) were actually the same planet, Venus.

Animation depicting Eudoxus' model of retrograde planetary motion. The two innermost homocentric spheres of his model are represented as rings here, each turning with the same period but in opposite directions, moving the planet along a figure-eight, or hippopede

The basic elements of Ptolemaic astronomy, showing a planet on an epicycle (smaller dashed circle), a deferent (larger dashed circle), the eccentric (×) and an equant (•).

Though unclear if motivated by empirical observations, the concept of a spherical Earth apparently first gained intellectual dominance in the Pythagorean school in Ancient Greece in the 5th century BC. Meanwhile, the Pythagorean astronomical system proposed the Earth and Sun and a counter-Earth rotate around an unseen "Central Fire". Influenced by Pythagoran thinking and Plato, philosophers Eudoxus, Callippus, and Aristotle all developed models of the solar system based on concentric spheres. These required more than one sphere per planet in order to account for the complicated curves they traced across the sky. Aristotelian physics used the Earth's place at the center of the universe along with the theory of classical elements to explain phenomena such as falling rocks and rising flames; objects in the sky were theorized to be composed of a unique element called aether.

A later geocentric model developed by Ptolemy attached smaller spheres to a smaller number of large spheres to explain the complex motions of the planets, a device known as deferent and epicycle first developed by Apollonius of Perga. Published in the Almagest, this model of celestial spheres surrounding a spherical Earth was reasonably accurate and predictive, and became dominant among educated people in various cultures, spreading from Ancient Greece to Ancient Rome, Christian Europe, the Islamic world, South Asia, and China via inheritance and copying of texts, conquest, trade, and missionaries. It remained in widespread use until the 16th century.

=== Heliocentric model ===
Various astronomers, especially those who had access to more precise observations, were skeptical of the geocentric model and proposed alternatives, including the heliocentric theory in which the planets and the Earth orbit the Sun. Many proposals did not spread outside the local culture, or did not become locally dominant. Aristarchus of Samos had speculated about heliocentrism in Ancient Greece; Martianus Capella taught in the early Middle Ages that both Mercury and Venus orbit the Sun, while the Moon, the Sun and the other planets orbit the Earth; in Al-Andalus, Arzachel proposed that Mercury orbits the Sun, and heliocentric astronomers worked in the Maragha school in Persia. Kerala-based astronomer Nilakantha Somayaji proposed a geoheliocentric system, in which the planets circled the Sun while the Sun, Moon and stars orbited the Earth.

Finally, Polish astronomer Nicolaus Copernicus developed in full a system called Copernican heliocentrism, in which the planets and the Earth orbit the Sun, and the Moon orbits the Earth. This theory was known to Danish astronomer Tycho Brahe, but he did not accept it, and proposed his own geoheliocentric Tychonic system. Brahe undertook a substantial series of more accurate observations. German natural philosopher Johannes Kepler at first worked to combine the Copernican system with Platonic solids, in line with his interpretation of Christianity and an ancient musical resonance theory known as Musica universalis. After becoming an assistant of Brahe, Kepler inherited the observations and was directed to mathematically analyze the orbit of Mars. After many failed attempts, he eventually made the groundbreaking discovery that the planets moved around the Sun in ellipses. He formulated and published what are now known as Kepler's laws of planetary motion from 1609 to 1619. This became the dominant model among astronomers, though as with celestial sphere models, the physical mechanism by which this motion occurred was somewhat mysterious and theories abounded.

It took some time for the new theories to spread across the world. For example, with the Age of Discovery already well under way, astronomical thought in America was based on the older Greek theories, but newer western European ideas began to appear in writing by 1659.

== Telescopic observations ==
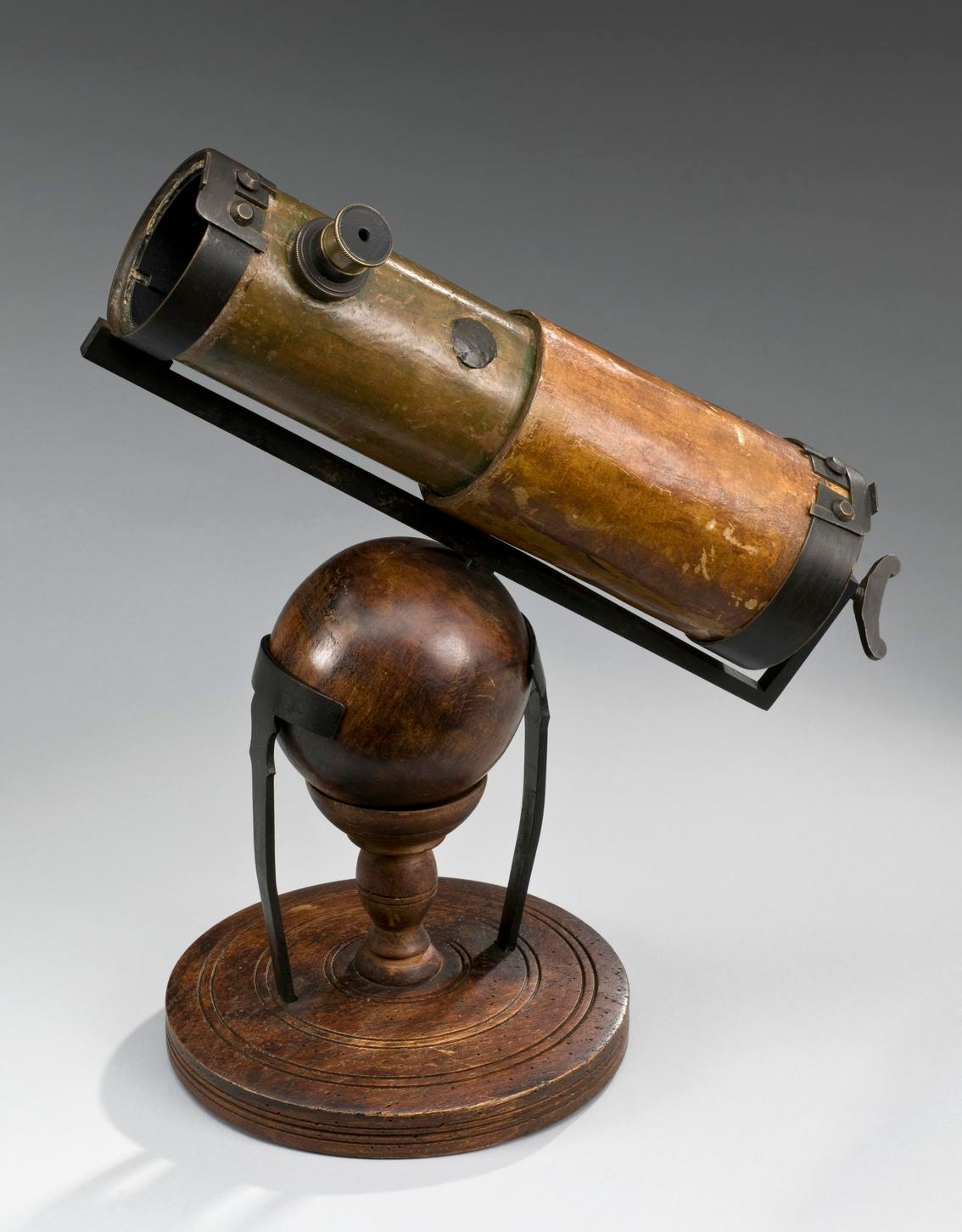
A replica of Isaac Newton's telescope

=== Early telescopic discoveries ===
The invention of the telescope revolutionized astronomy, making it possible to see details about the Sun, Moon, and planets not available to the naked eye. It appeared around 1608 in the Netherlands, and was quickly adopted among European enthusiasts and astronomers to study the skies.

Italian polymath Galileo Galilei was an early user and made prolific discoveries, including the phases of Venus, which definitively disproved the arrangement of spheres in the Ptolemaic system. Galileo also discovered that the Moon was cratered, that the Sun was marked with sunspots, and that Jupiter had four satellites in orbit around it. Christiaan Huygens followed on from Galileo's discoveries by discovering Saturn's moon Titan and the shape of the rings of Saturn. Giovanni Domenico Cassini later discovered four more moons of Saturn and the Cassini division in Saturn's rings.

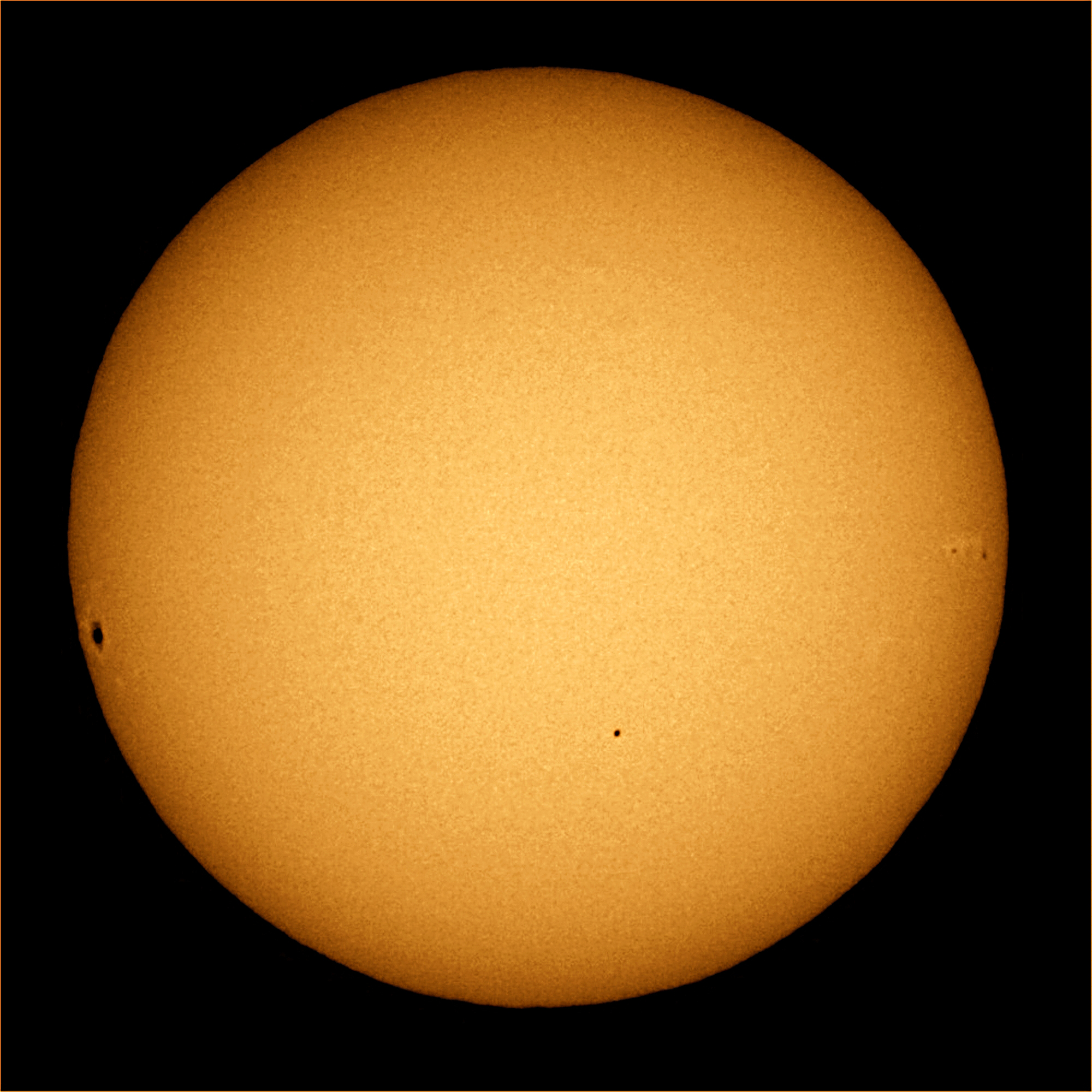
The Sun photographed through a telescope with special solar filter. Sunspots and limb darkening can be clearly seen. Mercury is transiting in the lower middle of the Sun's face.

Around 1677, Edmond Halley observed a transit of Mercury across the Sun, leading him to realise that observations of the solar parallax of a planet (more ideally using the transit of Venus) could be used to trigonometrically determine the distances between Earth, Venus, and the Sun. In 1705, Halley realised that repeated sightings of a comet were recording the same object, returning regularly once every 75–76 years. This was the first evidence that anything other than the planets orbited the Sun, though this had been theorized about comets in the 1st century by Seneca. Around 1704, the term "Solar System" first appeared in English.

=== Newtonian physics ===
English astronomer and mathematician Isaac Newton, incidentally building on recent scientific inquiries into the speed at which objects fall, was inspired by claims by rival Robert Hooke of a proof of Kepler's laws. Newton was able to explain the motions of the planets by hypothesizing a force of gravity acting between all solar system objects in proportion to their mass and an inverse-square law for distance – Newton's law of universal gravitation. Newton's 1687 Philosophiæ Naturalis Principia Mathematica explained this along with Newton's laws of motion, for the first time providing a unified explanation for astronomical and terrestrial phenomena. These concepts became the basis of classical mechanics, which enabled future advancements in many fields of physics.

=== Discovery of additional planets and moons ===
The telescope made it possible for the first time to detect objects not visible to the naked eye. This took some time to accomplish, due to various logistical considerations such as the low magnification power of early equipment, the small area of the sky covered in any given observation, and the work involved in comparing multiple observations over different nights.

In 1781, William Herschel was looking for binary stars in the constellation of Taurus when he observed what he thought was a new comet. Its orbit revealed that it was a new planet, Uranus, the first ever discovered telescopically.

Giuseppe Piazzi discovered Ceres in 1801, a small world between Mars and Jupiter. It was considered another planet, but after subsequent discoveries of other small worlds in the same region, it and the others were eventually reclassified as asteroids.

By 1846, discrepancies in the orbit of Uranus led many to suspect a large planet must be tugging at it from farther out. John Adams and Urbain Le Verrier's calculations eventually led to the discovery of Neptune. The excess perihelion precession of Mercury's orbit led Le Verrier to postulate the intra-Mercurian planet Vulcan in 1859, but that would turn out not to exist: the excess perihelion precession was finally explained by Einstein's general relativity, which displaced Newton's theory as the most accurate description of gravity on large scales.

Eventually, new moons were discovered also around Uranus starting in 1787 by Herschel, around Neptune starting in 1846 by William Lassell and around Mars in 1877 by Asaph Hall.

Further apparent discrepancies in the orbits of the outer planets led Percival Lowell to conclude that yet another planet, "Planet X", must lie beyond Neptune. After his death, his Lowell Observatory conducted a search that ultimately led to Clyde Tombaugh's discovery of Pluto in 1930. Pluto was, however, found to be too small to have disrupted the orbits of the outer planets, and its discovery was therefore coincidental. Like Ceres, it was initially considered to be a planet, but after the discovery of many other similarly sized objects in its vicinity it was reclassified in 2006 as a dwarf planet by the IAU.

=== More technical improvements ===
In 1668 Isaac Newton builds his own reflecting telescope, the first fully functional of this kind, and considered a landmark for future developments as it reduces spherical aberration with no chromatic aberration. Today, most powerful telescopes in the world are of that type.

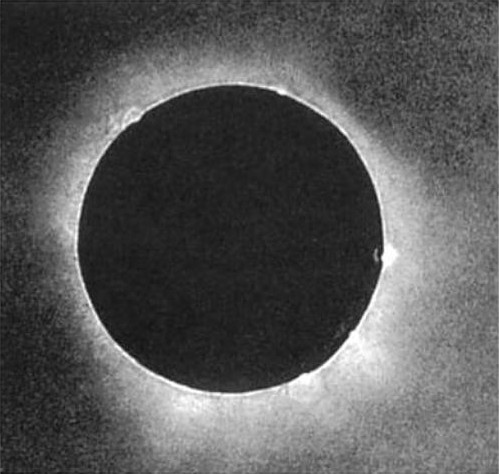
The first solar eclipse photograph was taken on July 28, 1851, by a daguerrotypist named Berkowski.

In 1840 John W. Draper takes a daguerreotype of the Moon, the first astronomical photograph. Since then, astrophotography is a key tool in the observational studies of the skies.

Spectroscopy is a method that permits to study materials by means of the light they emit, developed around 1835–1860 by Charles Wheatstone, Léon Foucault, Anders Jonas Ångström and others. Robert Bunsen and Gustav Kirchhoff further develop the spectroscope, which they used to pioneer the identification of the chemical elements in Earth, and also in the Sun. Around 1862 Father Angelo Secchi developed the heliospectrograph, enabling him to study both the Sun and the stars, and identifying them as things intrinsically of the same kind. In 1868 Jules Janssen and Norman Lockyer discovered a new element in the Sun unknown on Earth, helium, which currently comprises 23.8% of the mass in the solar photosphere. As of today, spectroscopes are an important tool to know about the chemical composition of the celestial bodies.

By the mid-20th century, new important technologies for remote sensing and observation arose, as radar, radio astronomy and astronautics.

=== Discovery of the solar system as one among many ===
In ancient times, there was a common belief in the so-called "sphere of fixed stars", a giant dome-like structure or firmament centered on Earth which was the boundary of the whole universe, rotating daily around the Earth. Since Hellenistic astronomy and through the Middle Ages, the estimated radius of such a sphere was becoming increasingly large, up to inconceivable distances. But by the European Renaissance, it was deemed improbable that such a huge sphere could complete a single revolution of 360° around the Earth in only 24 hours, and this point was one of the arguments of Nicholas Copernicus for discarding the centuries-old geocentric model.

In the 16th century, a number of writers inspired by Copernicus, such as Thomas Digges, Giordano Bruno and William Gilbert, argued for an indefinitely extended or even infinite universe, with other stars as distant suns, paving the way to deprecate the Aristotelian sphere of the fixed stars.

When Galileo Galilei examined the skies and constellations through a telescope, he concluded that the "fixed stars" which had been studied and mapped were only a tiny portion of the massive universe that lay beyond the reach of the naked eye. He also aimed his telescope at the faint strip of the Milky Way, and he found that it resolves into countless white star-like spots, presumably further stars themselves.

The term "Solar System" had entered the English language by 1704, when John Locke used it to refer to the Sun, planets, and comets as a whole. By then it had been established beyond doubt that planets are other worlds; thus the stars would be other distant suns, and the whole Solar System is actually only a small part of an immensely large universe.

Although it is debatable when the Solar System as such was truly "discovered", three 19th-century observations determined its nature and place in the Universe beyond reasonable doubt. First, in 1835–1838, Thomas Henderson and Friedrich Bessel successfully measured two stellar parallaxes, apparent shifts in the position of a nearby star due to Earth's motion around the Sun. This was not only a direct, experimental proof of heliocentrism (James Bradley had already done that in 1729 when he discovered that the cause of the aberration of starlight is the Earth's motion around the Sun), but also accurately revealed, for the first time, the vast distance between the Solar System and the closest stars. Then, in 1859, Robert Bunsen and Gustav Kirchhoff, using the newly invented spectroscope, examined the spectral signature of the Sun and discovered that it was composed of the same elements as existed on Earth, establishing for the first time a physical similarity between Earth and the other bodies visible from Earth. Then, Father Angelo Secchi compared the spectral signature of the Sun with those of other stars, and found them virtually identical. The realisation that the Sun is a star led to a scientifically updated hypothesis that other stars could have planetary systems of their own, though this was not to be proven for nearly 140 years.

Observational cosmology began with attempts by William Herschel to describe the shape of the then known universe. In 1785, he proposed the Milky Way was a disk, but assumed the Sun was at the center. This heliocentric theory was overturned by galactocentrism in the 1910s, after more observations by Harlow Shapley placed the Galactic Center relatively far away.

=== Extrasolar planets and the Kuiper belt ===
In 1992, the first evidence of a planetary system other than our own was discovered, orbiting the pulsar PSR B1257+12. Three years later, 51 Pegasi b, the first extrasolar planet around a Sunlike star, was discovered. NASA announced in March 2022 that the number of discovered exoplanets reached 5,000, of several types and sizes.

Also in 1992, astronomers David C. Jewitt of the University of Hawaii and Jane Luu of the Massachusetts Institute of Technology discovered Albion. This object proved to be the first of a new population, which became known as the Kuiper belt; an icy analogue to the asteroid belt of which such objects as Pluto and Charon were deemed a part, the Kuiper belt objects (KBO).

Teams by Mike Brown, Chad Trujillo and David Rabinowitz discovered the trans-Neptunian objects (TNO) Quaoar in 2002, Sedna in 2003, Orcus and Haumea in 2004 and Makemake in 2005, part of the most notable KBOs, some now regarded as dwarf planets. Also in 2005 they announced the discovery of Eris, a scattered disc object initially thought to be larger than Pluto, which would make it the largest object discovered in orbit around the Sun since Neptune. New Horizons' fly-by of Pluto in July 2015 resulted in more-accurate measurements of Pluto, which is slightly larger, though less massive, than Eris.

== Observations by radar ==
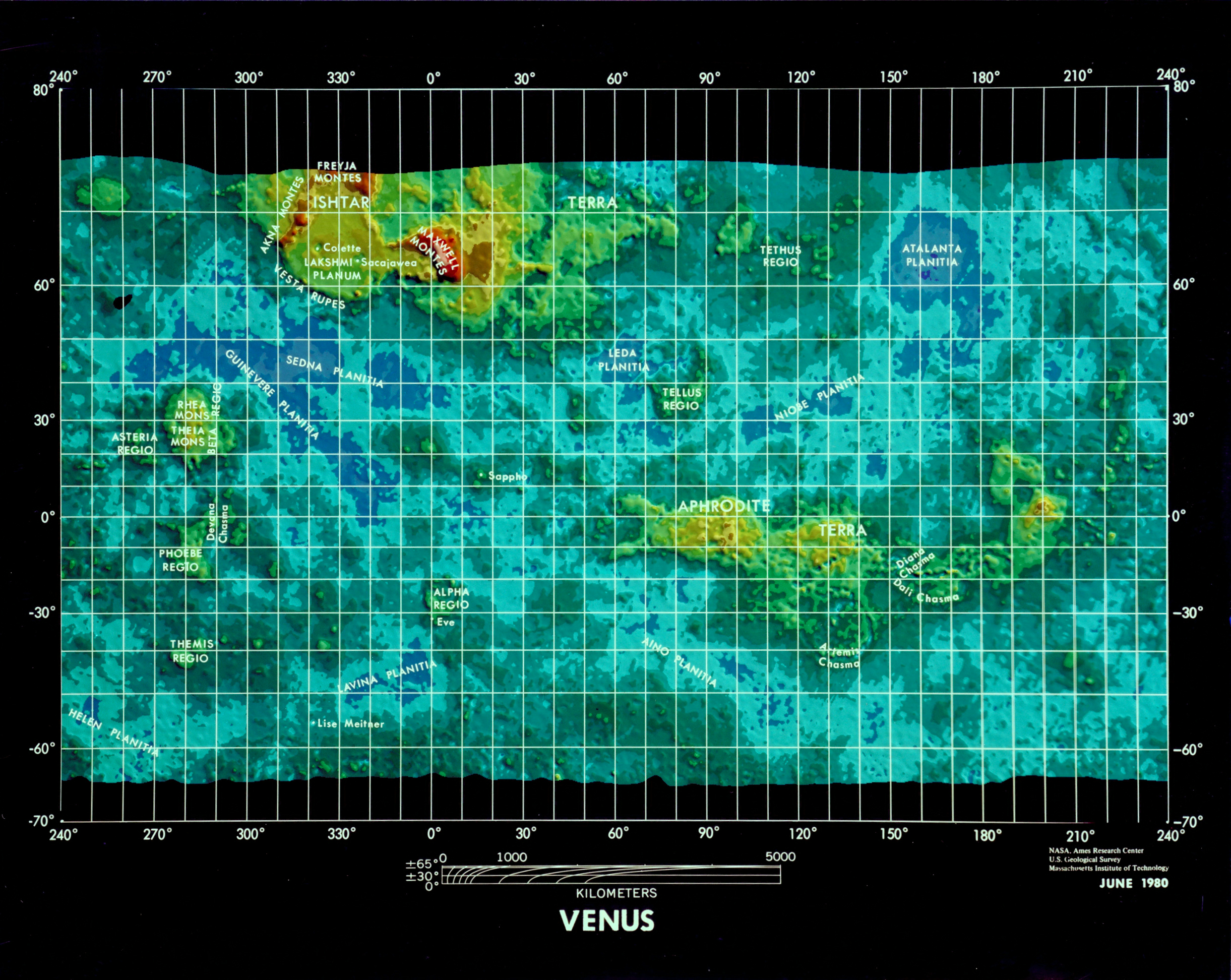
A map of Venus produced from Magellan radar data

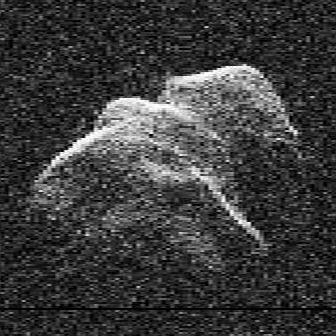
Radar image of asteroid 4179 Toutatis

Radar astronomy is the technique for observing nearby astronomical objects by reflecting radio waves or microwaves off target objects and analyzing their reflections, which provide information about the shapes and surface properties of solid bodies, unavailable by other means. Radar can also accurately measure the position and track the movement of such bodies, specially when they are small, as comets and asteroids, as well as to determine distances between objects in the Solar System. In certain cases radar imaging has produced images with up to 7.5-meter resolution.

The Moon is comparatively close and was studied by radar soon after the invention of the technique in 1946, mainly precise measurements of its distance and its surface roughness.

Other bodies that have been observed by this means include:

- Mercury – Improved value for the distance from the Earth observed (test of theory of General relativity). Rotational period, libration, surface mapping, study of polar regions.
- Venus – First radar detection in 1961. Measurement of the size of the astronomical unit. Rotation period, gross surface properties. The Magellan mission mapped the entire planet using a radar altimeter, a task that cannot be made by optical means due to the opaque atmosphere of this planet.
- Earth – Numerous airborne and spacecraft radars have mapped the entire planet, for various purposes. One example is the Shuttle Radar Topography Mission, which mapped large parts of the surface of Earth at 30 m resolution.
- Mars – Mapping of surface roughness from Arecibo Observatory. The Mars Express mission carries a ground-penetrating radar.
- Jupiter system – Survey of moon Europa.
- Saturn system – Rings and Titan from Arecibo Observatory. Mapping of Titan's surface and observations of other moons from the Cassini spacecraft. As Venus, Titan also possesses an opaque atmosphere.

By 2018, there have been radar observations of 138 main belt asteroids, 789 near-Earth asteroids, and 20 comets, including 73P/Schwassmann-Wachmann.

== Observations by spacecraft ==
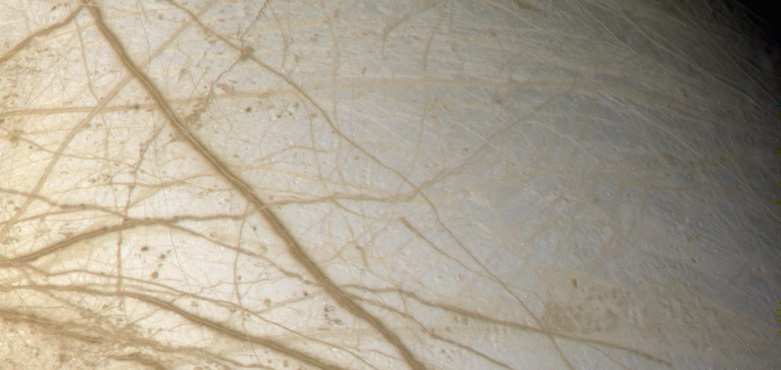
Lineae on Europa by Galileo spacecraft

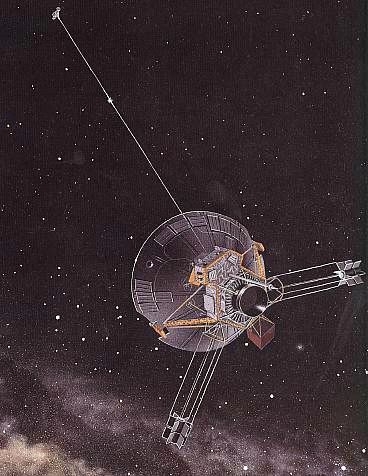
Artist's conception of Pioneer 10, which passed the orbit of Pluto in 1983. The last transmission was received in January 2003, sent from approximately 82 AU away. The 53–54-year-old space probe is receding from the Sun at over 43,400 km/h (27,000 mph),

Since the start of the Space Age, a great deal of exploration has been performed by robotic spacecraft missions that have been organized and executed by various space agencies.

All planets in the Solar System, plus their major moons along some asteroids and comets, have now been visited to varying degrees by spacecraft launched from Earth. Through these uncrewed missions, humans have been able to get close-up photographs of all the planets and, in the case of landers, perform tests of the soils and atmospheres of some.

The first artificial object sent into space was the Soviet satellite Sputnik 1, launched on 4 October 1957, which successfully orbited Earth until 4 January the following year. The American probe Explorer 6, launched in 1959, was the first satellite to image Earth from space.

=== Flybys ===
The first successful probe to fly by another Solar System body was Luna 1, which sped past the Moon in 1959. Originally meant to impact with the Moon, it instead missed its target and became the first artificial object to orbit the Sun. Mariner 2 was the first planetary flyby, passing Venus in 1962. The first successful flyby of Mars was made by Mariner 4 in 1965. Mariner 10 first passed Mercury in 1974.

The first probe to explore the outer planets was Pioneer 10, which flew by Jupiter in 1973. Pioneer 11 was the first to visit Saturn, in 1979. The Voyager probes performed a Grand Tour of the outer planets following their launch in 1977, with both probes passing Jupiter in 1979 and Saturn in 1980–1981. Voyager 2 then went on to make close approaches to Uranus in 1986 and Neptune in 1989. The two Voyager probes are now far beyond Neptune's orbit, and are on course to find and study the termination shock, heliosheath, and heliopause. According to NASA, both Voyager probes have encountered the termination shock at a distance of approximately 93 AU from the Sun.

The first flyby of a comet occurred in 1985, when the International Cometary Explorer (ICE) passed by the comet Giacobini–Zinner, whereas the first flybys of asteroids were conducted by the Galileo space probe, which imaged both 951 Gaspra (in 1991) and 243 Ida (in 1993) on its way to Jupiter.

Launched on January 19, 2006, the New Horizons probe is the first human-made spacecraft to explore the Kuiper belt. This uncrewed mission flew by Pluto in July 2015. The mission was extended to observe a number of other Kuiper belt objects, including a close flyby of 486958 Arrokoth on New Year's Day, 2019.

As of 2011, American scientists are concerned that exploration beyond the Asteroid Belt will hampered by a shortage of Plutonium-238.

=== Orbiters, landers, rovers and flying probes ===
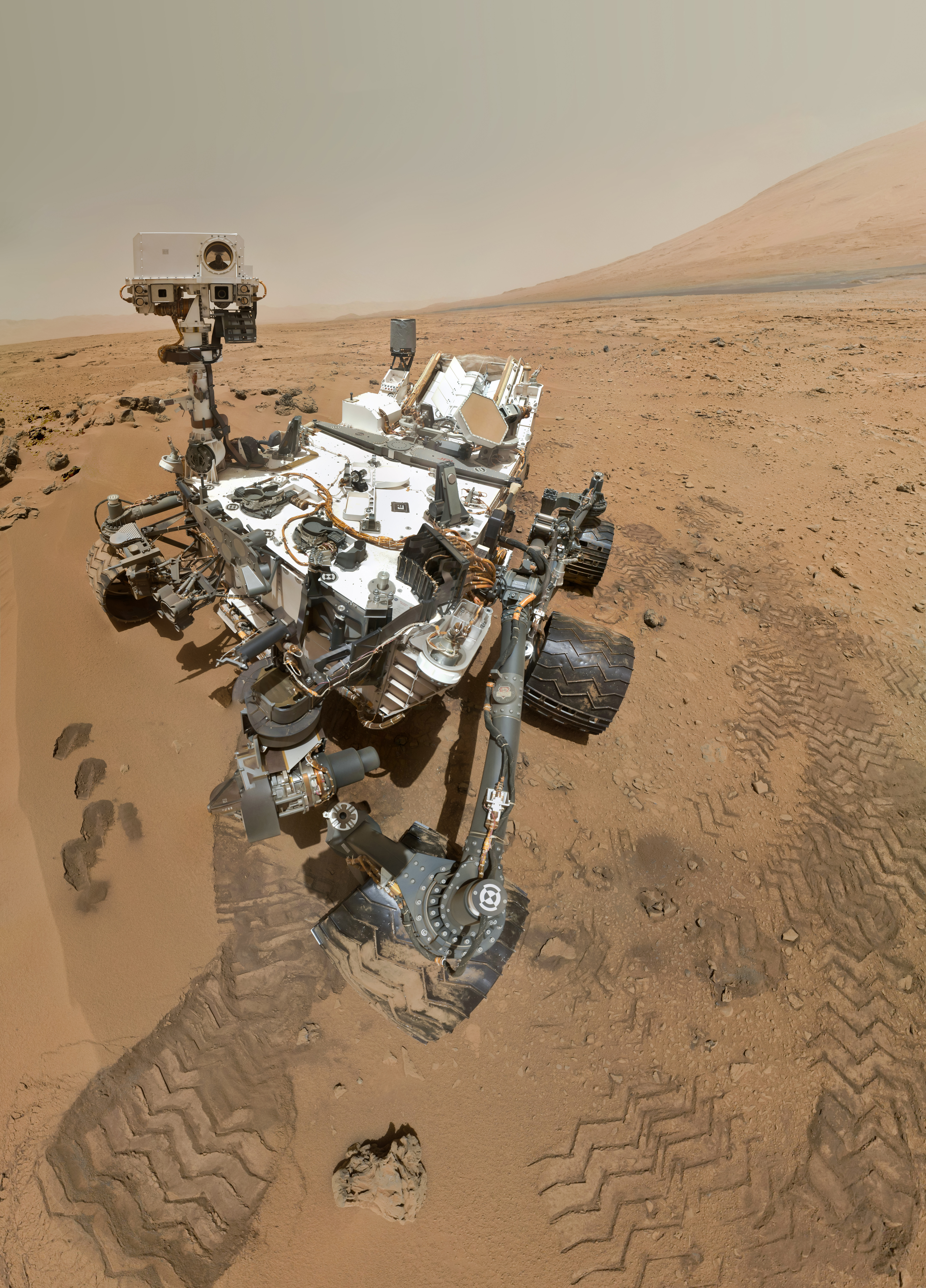
Curiosity rover self-portrait at "Rocknest" (October 31, 2012), with the rim of Gale Crater and the slopes of Aeolis Mons in the distance

In 1966, the Moon became the first Solar System body beyond Earth to be orbited by an artificial satellite (Luna 10), followed by Mars in 1971 (Mariner 9), Venus in 1975 (Venera 9), Jupiter in 1995 (Galileo), the asteroid Eros in 2000 (NEAR Shoemaker), Saturn in 2004 (Cassini–Huygens), and Mercury and Vesta in 2011 (MESSENGER and Dawn respectively). Dawn was orbiting the asteroid–dwarf planet Ceres since 2015 and it is still there as of 2023, but it became inactive since 2018. In 2014 Rosetta spacecraft becomes the first comet orbiter, around Churyumov–Gerasimenko.

The first probe to land on another Solar System body was the Soviet Luna 2 probe, which impacted the Moon in 1959. Since then, increasingly distant planets have been reached, with probes landing on or impacting the surfaces of Venus in 1966 (Venera 3), Mars in 1971 (Mars 3, although a fully successful landing didn't occur until Viking 1 in 1976), the asteroid Eros in 2001 (NEAR Shoemaker), Saturn's moon Titan in 2004 (Huygens), the comets Tempel 1 (Deep Impact) in 2005, and Churyumov–Gerasimenko (Philae) in 2014. The Galileo orbiter also dropped a probe into Jupiter's atmosphere in 1995, this was intended to descend as far as possible into the gas giant before being destroyed by heat and pressure.

As of 2022, three bodies in the Solar System, the Moon, Mars and Ryugu have been visited by mobile rovers. The first robotic rover to visit another celestial body was the Soviet Lunokhod 1, which landed on the Moon in 1970. The first to visit another planet was Sojourner, which travelled 500 metres across the surface of Mars in 1997. The first flying probe on in Solar System was the Vega balloons in 1985, while first powered flight was undertook by Ingenuity in 2020. The only crewed rover to visit another world was NASA's Lunar Roving Vehicle, which traveled with Apollos 15, 16 and 17 between 1971 and 1972.

In 2022, the DART impactor crashed into Dimorphos, the minor-planet moon of the asteroid Didymos, with the explicit purpose of intentionally deviate (slightly) the orbit of a Solar System body for the first time ever, which it accomplished.

=== Sample return ===
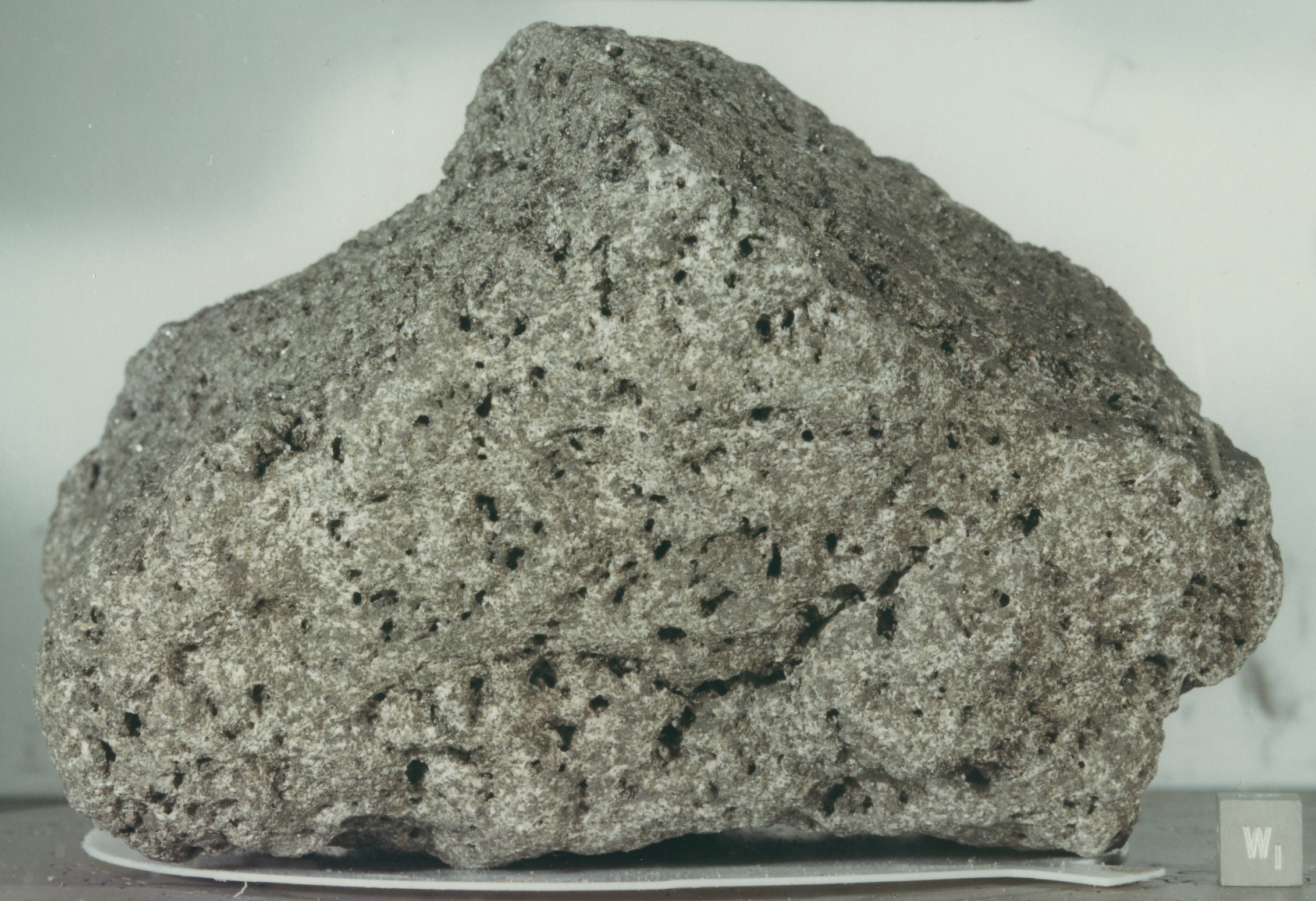
A Moon rock returned by Apollo 17

In some instances, both human and robotic explorers have taken physical samples of the visited bodies and return them back to Earth. Other extraterrestrial materials came to Earth naturally, as meteorites, or became stuck to artificial satellites; they are specimens which also allows studying Solar System matter.

- Moon (various missions including Apollo, Luna and Chang'e).
- Asteroid (Hayabusa, Osiris Rex, Tianwen-2 and Hayabusa2).
- Comet dust (Stardust).
- Solar wind (Genesis).

=== Spacecraft exploration ===
Overview of some missions to the Solar System
#	Spacecraft	Launch year	Mercury	Venus	Mars	Ceres	Jupiter	Saturn	Uranus	Neptune	Pluto	End year
1	Venera 3	1965		Crash landing								1966
2	Pioneer 10	1972					Flyby					2003
3	Pioneer 11	1973					Flyby	Flyby				1995
4	Mariner 10	1973	Flyby	Flyby								1975
5	Voyager 1	1977					Flyby	Flyby				—
6	Voyager 2	1977					Flyby	Flyby	Flyby	Flyby		—
7	Galileo	1989		Flyby			Orbiter					2003
8	Ulysses	1990					Flyby					2009
9	Cassini	1997		Flyby			Flyby	Orbiter				2017
10	Mars Odyssey	2001			Orbiter							—
11	MER-A / B	2003			Rovers							2010 / 2018
12	Mars Express	2003			Orbiter							—
13	MESSENGER	2004	Orbiter	Flyby								2015
14	MRO	2005			Orbiter							—
15	Venus Express	2005		Orbiter								2014
16	New Horizons	2006					Flyby				Flyby	—
17	Dawn	2007				Orbiter						2018
18	Juno	2011					Orbiter					—
19	Curiosity (MSL)	2011			Rover							—
20	Tianwen-1	2020			Orbiter							—
20	Zhurong	2020			Rover							—
21	Perseverance (Mars 2020)	2020			Rover							—
21	Ingenuity (Mars 2020)	2020			Flying probe							—

See also the categories for missions to comets, asteroids, the Moon, and the Sun.

== Crewed exploration ==
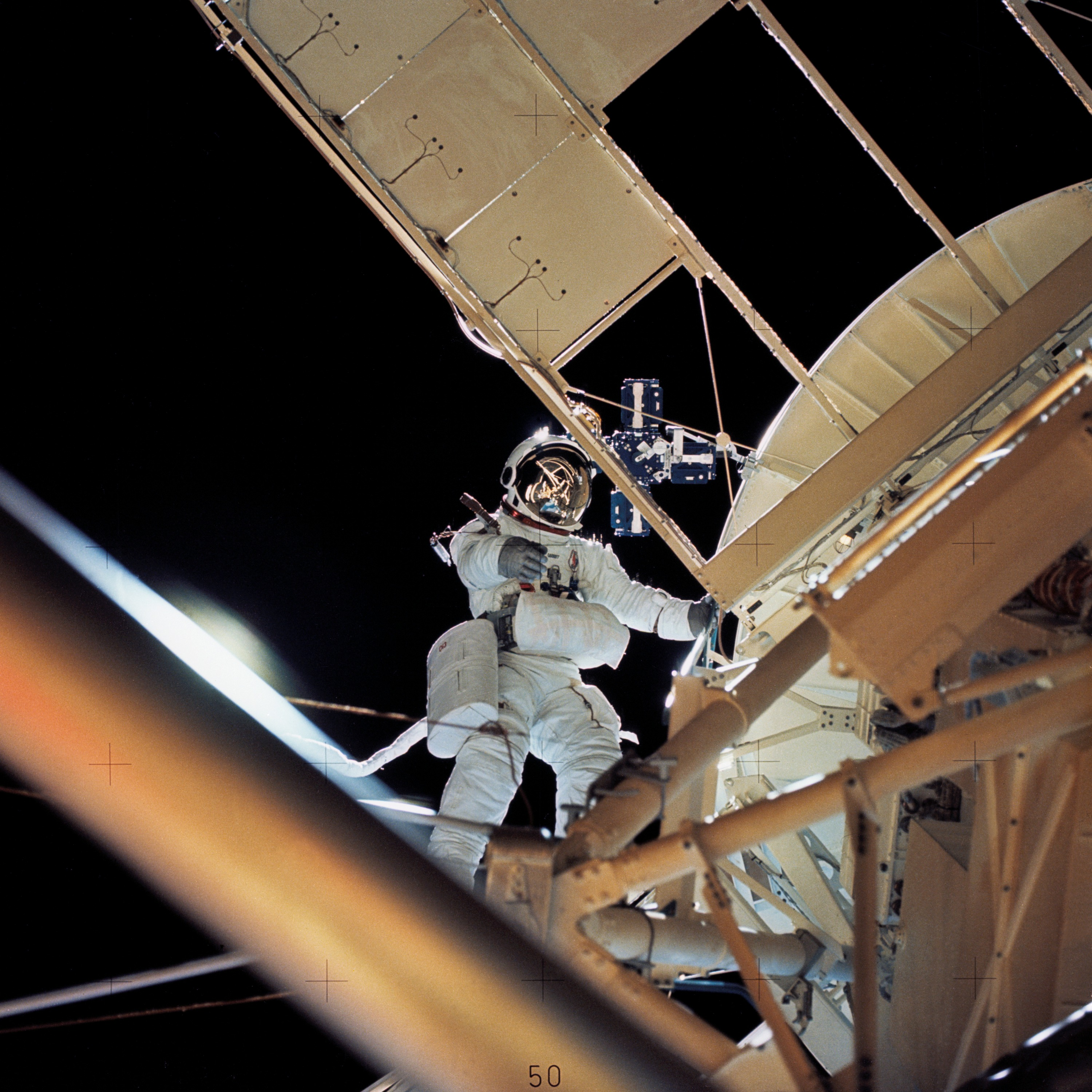
Owen Garriott on an Earth orbit EVA, 1973

The first human being to reach space (defined as an altitude of over 100 km) and to orbit Earth was Yuri Gagarin, a Soviet cosmonaut who was launched in Vostok 1 on April 12, 1961. The first human to walk on the surface of another Solar System body was Neil Armstrong, who stepped onto the Moon on July 21, 1969, during the Apollo 11 mission. From then until 1972, there were five more Moon landings. The United States' reusable Space Shuttle flew 135 missions between 1981 and 2011. Two of the five shuttles were destroyed in accidents.

The first orbital space station to host more than one crew was NASA's Skylab, which successfully held three crews from 1973 to 1974. True human settlement in space began with the Soviet space station Mir, which was continuously occupied for close to ten years, from 1989 to 1999. Its successor, the International Space Station, has maintained a continuous human presence in space since 2001. In 2004, U.S. President George W. Bush announced the Vision for Space Exploration, which called for a replacement for the aging Shuttle, a return to the Moon and, ultimately, a crewed mission to Mars.

== Exploration by country ==
Legend
☄ – orbit or flyby
❏ - Space observatory
Ѫ – successful landing on an object
⚗ – sample return
⚘ – crewed mission
ↂ – permanent inhabited space station

Country or organisation	LEO	Moon	Mars	Mars moons	SSSBs	Venus	Mercury	Outer Solar System
United States	☄❏⚘ↂ	☄❏Ѫ⚗⚘	☄Ѫ	☄	☄Ѫ⚗	☄Ѫ	☄	☄
Soviet Union	☄❏⚘ↂ	☄Ѫ⚗	☄Ѫ	☄	☄	☄Ѫ		
China	☄❏⚘ↂ	☄❏Ѫ⚗	☄Ѫ		☄			
Russia (since 1992)	☄❏⚘ↂ							
Japan	☄❏ↂ	☄Ѫ			☄Ѫ⚗	☄		
ESA	☄❏ↂ	☄	☄	☄	☄Ѫ	☄		☄Ѫ
India	☄❏	☄Ѫ	☄					
Israel	☄	☄						
South Korea	☄	☄						
United Arab Emirates			☄					
Iran	☄							
Ukraine (since 1992)	☄							
North Korea	☄							
New Zealand	☄							
Commercial	☄⚘	☄Ѫ						

Notes:
- Only successful or partially successful missions are counted; instruments on a spacecraft made by another country are not counted as a separate mission
- Clicking on the symbol opens an article describing the first successful mission in that category

== Exploration survey ==
Bodies imaged up close

Solar System, ordered by size

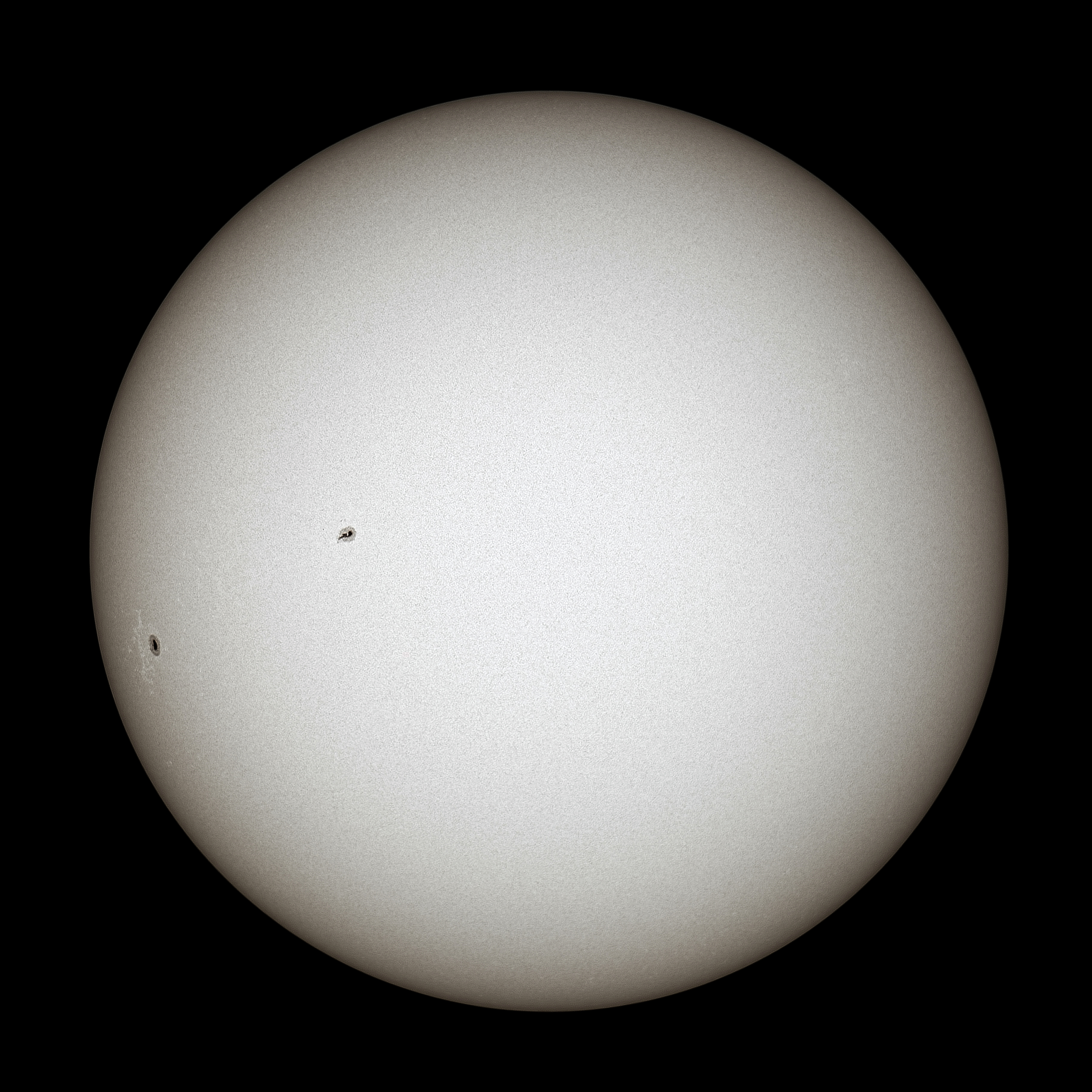
Sun
(star)

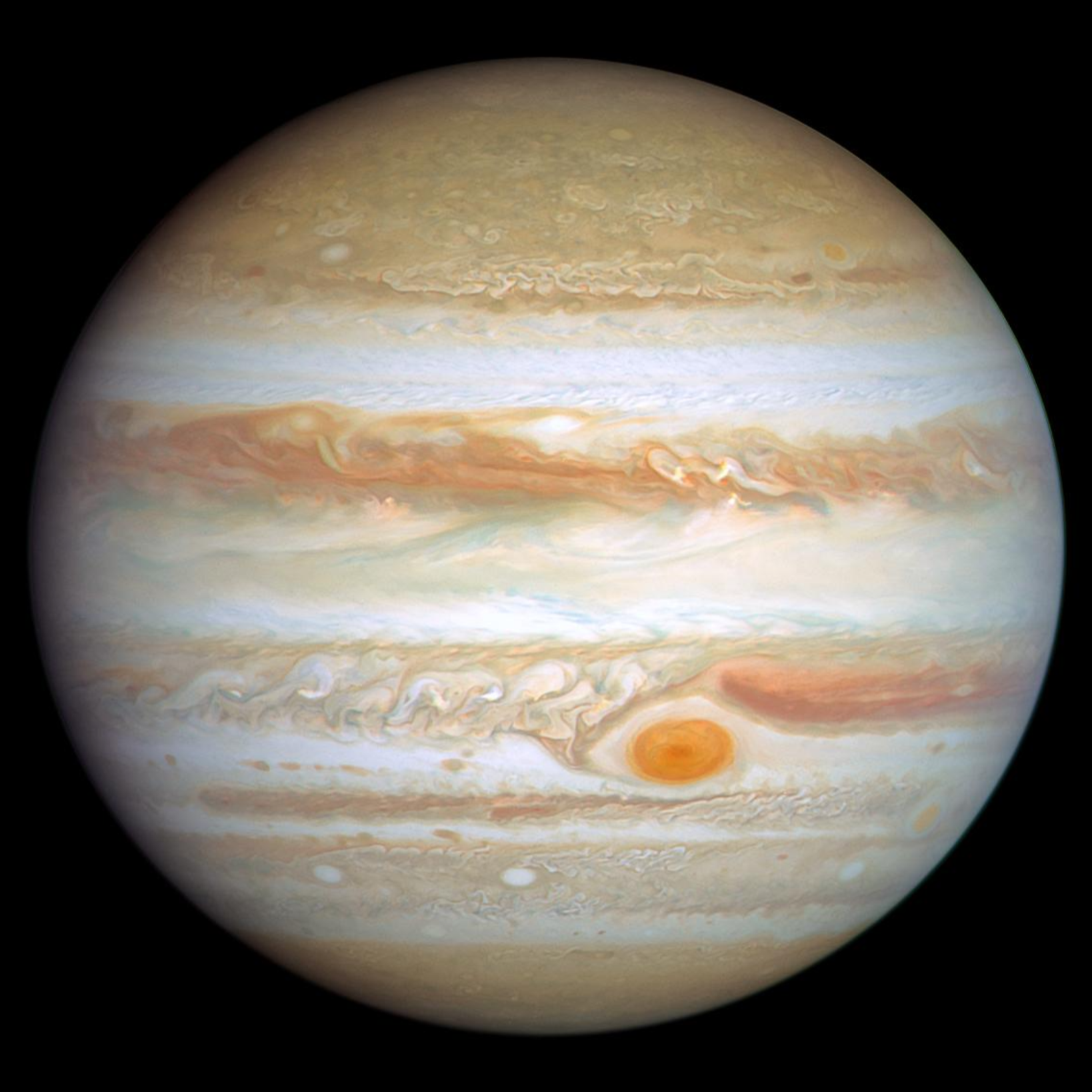
Jupiter
(planet)

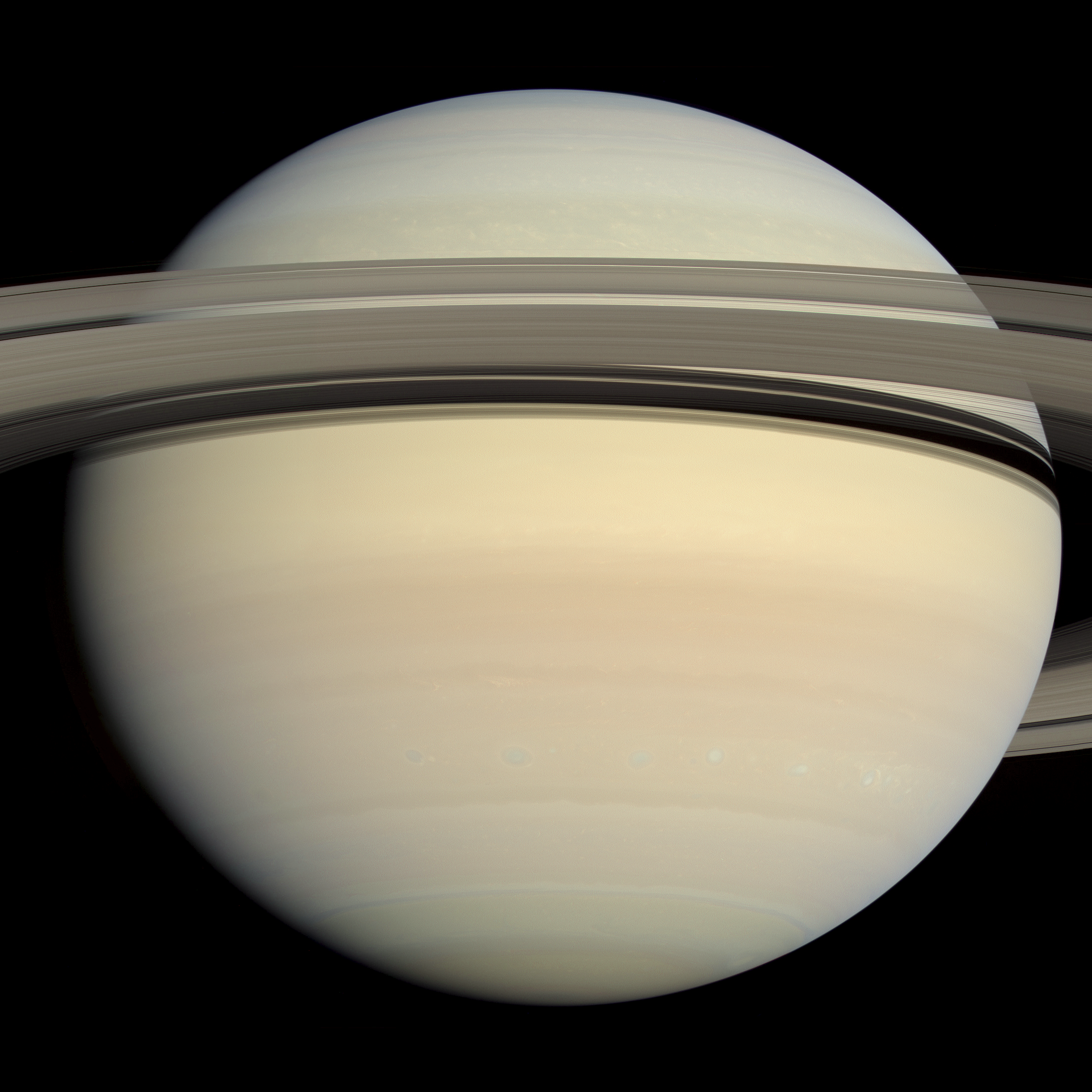
Saturn
(planet)

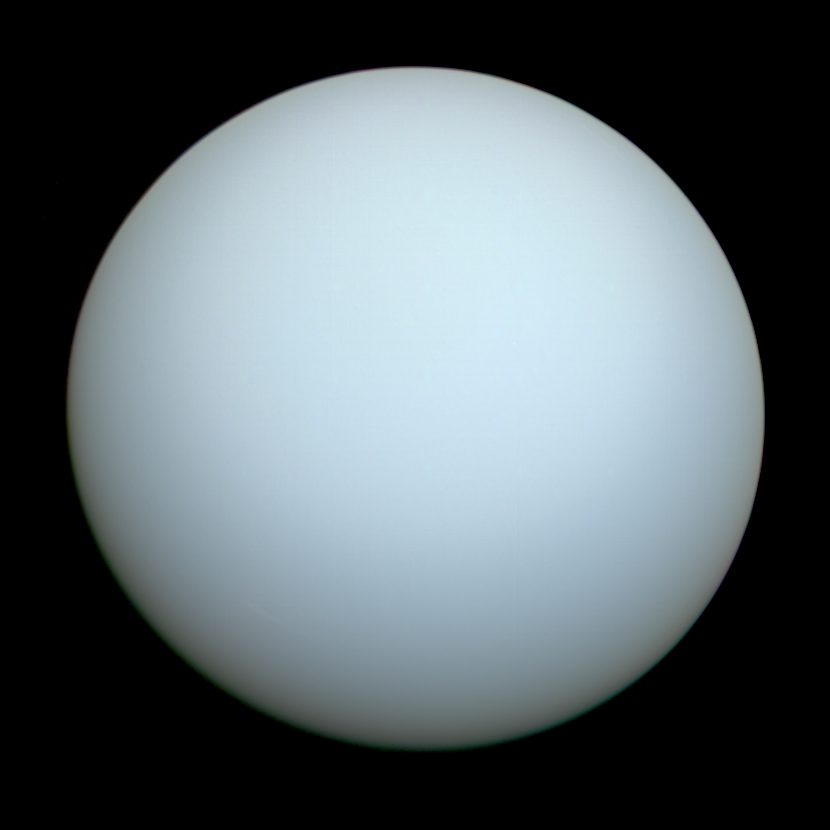
Uranus
(planet)

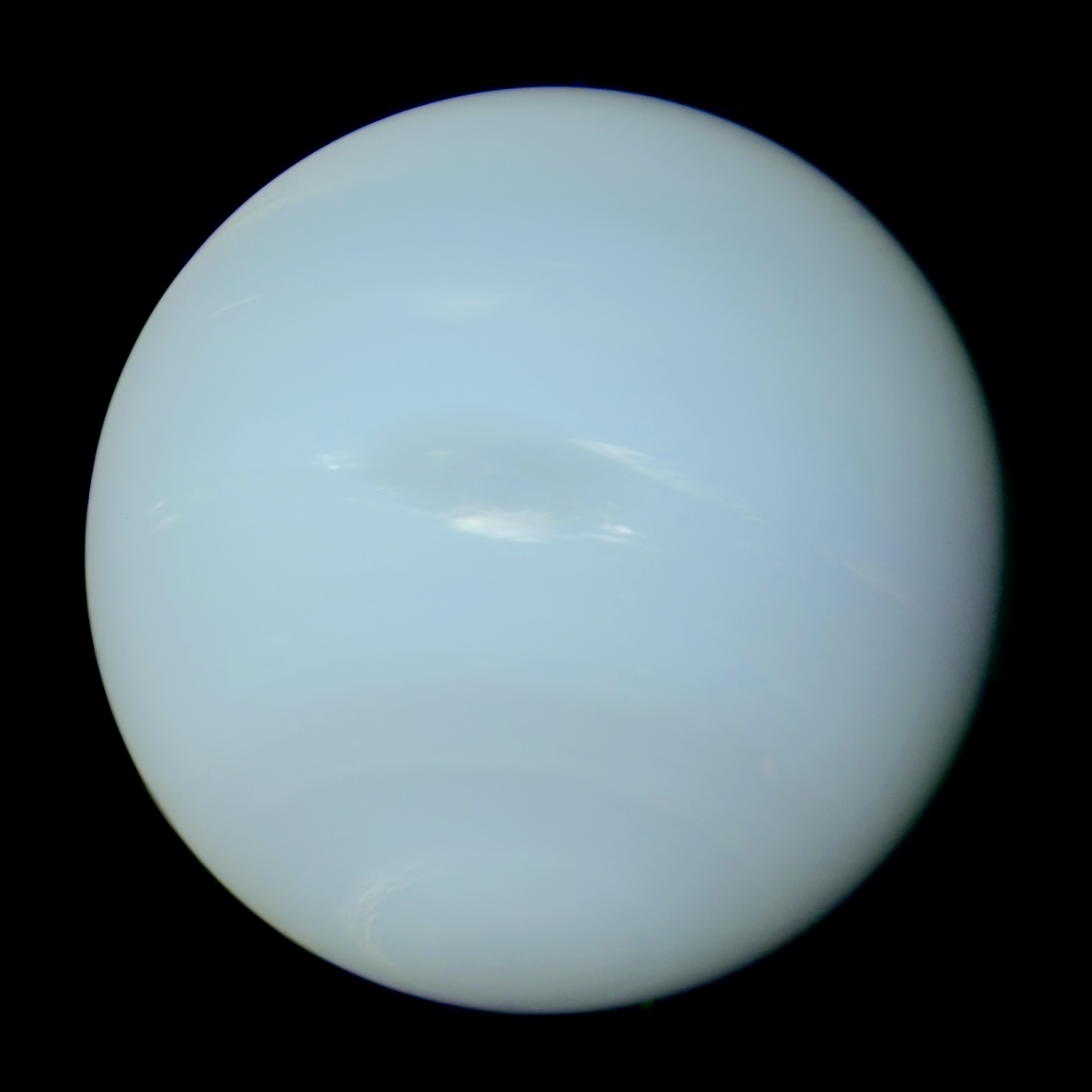
Neptune
(planet)

Earth
(planet)

Venus
(planet)

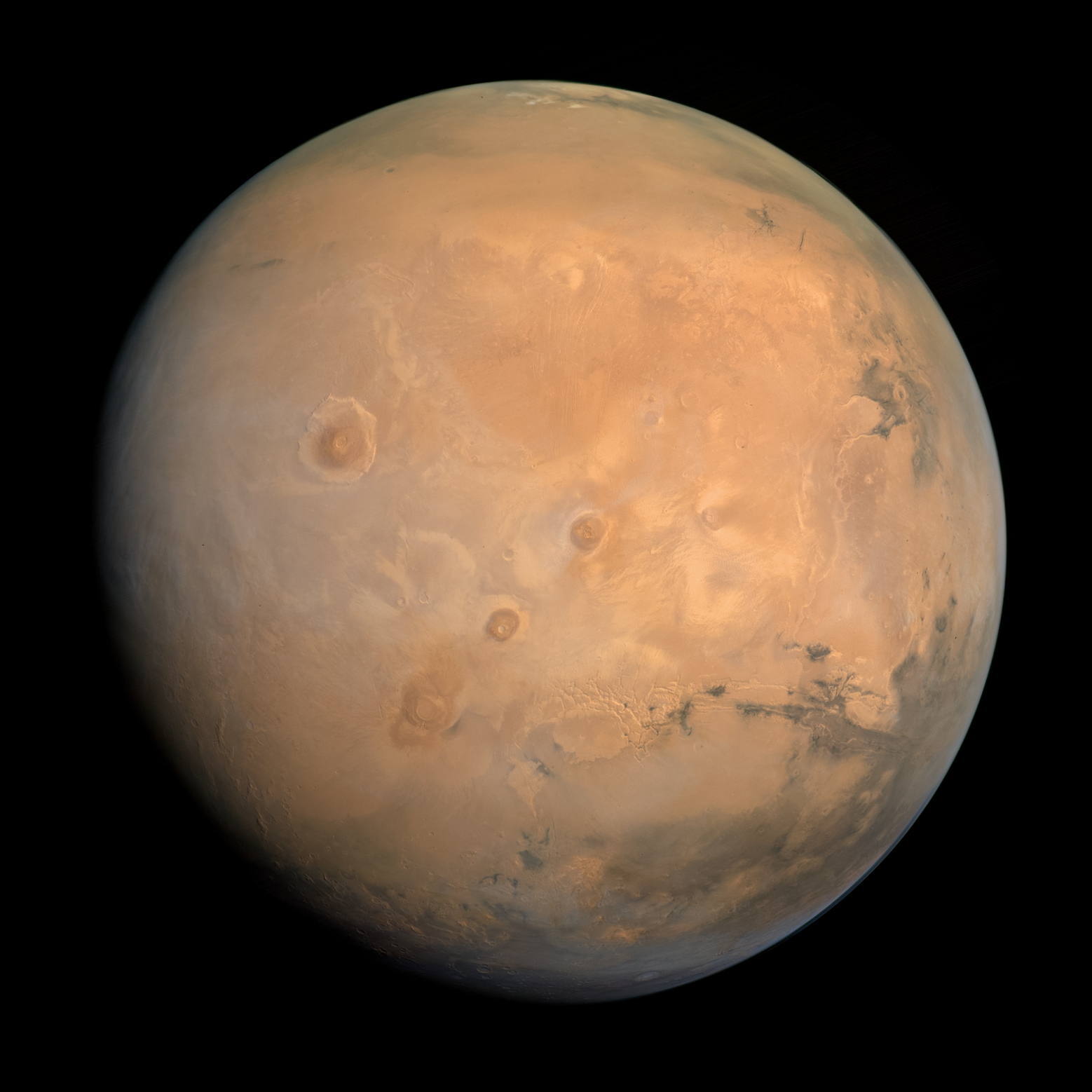
Mars
(planet)

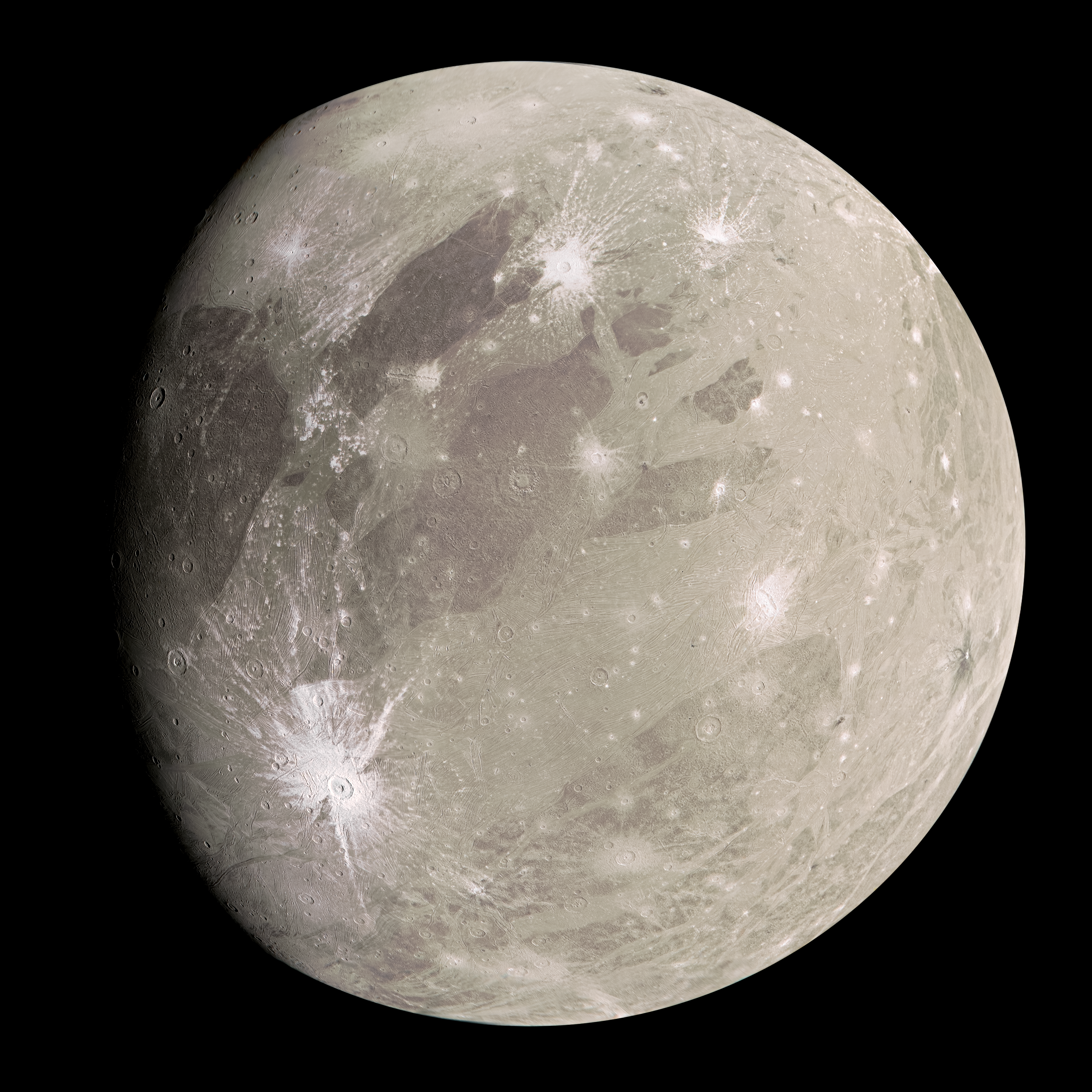
Ganymede
(moon of Jupiter)

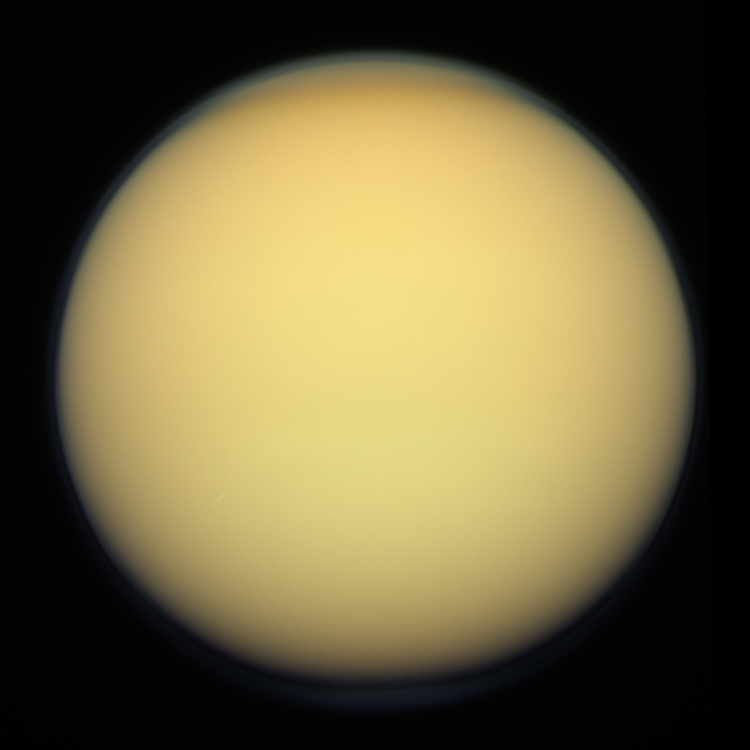
Titan
(moon of Saturn)

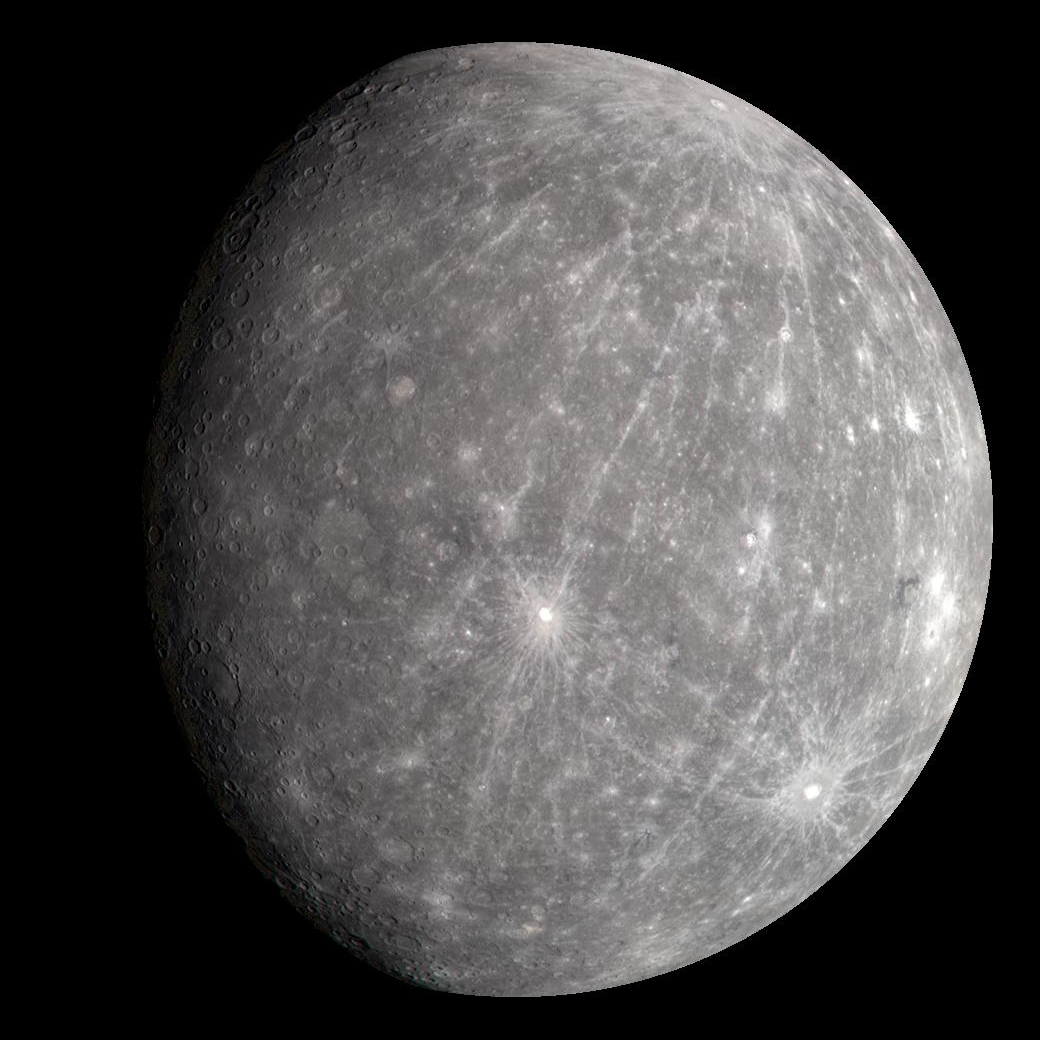
Mercury
(planet)

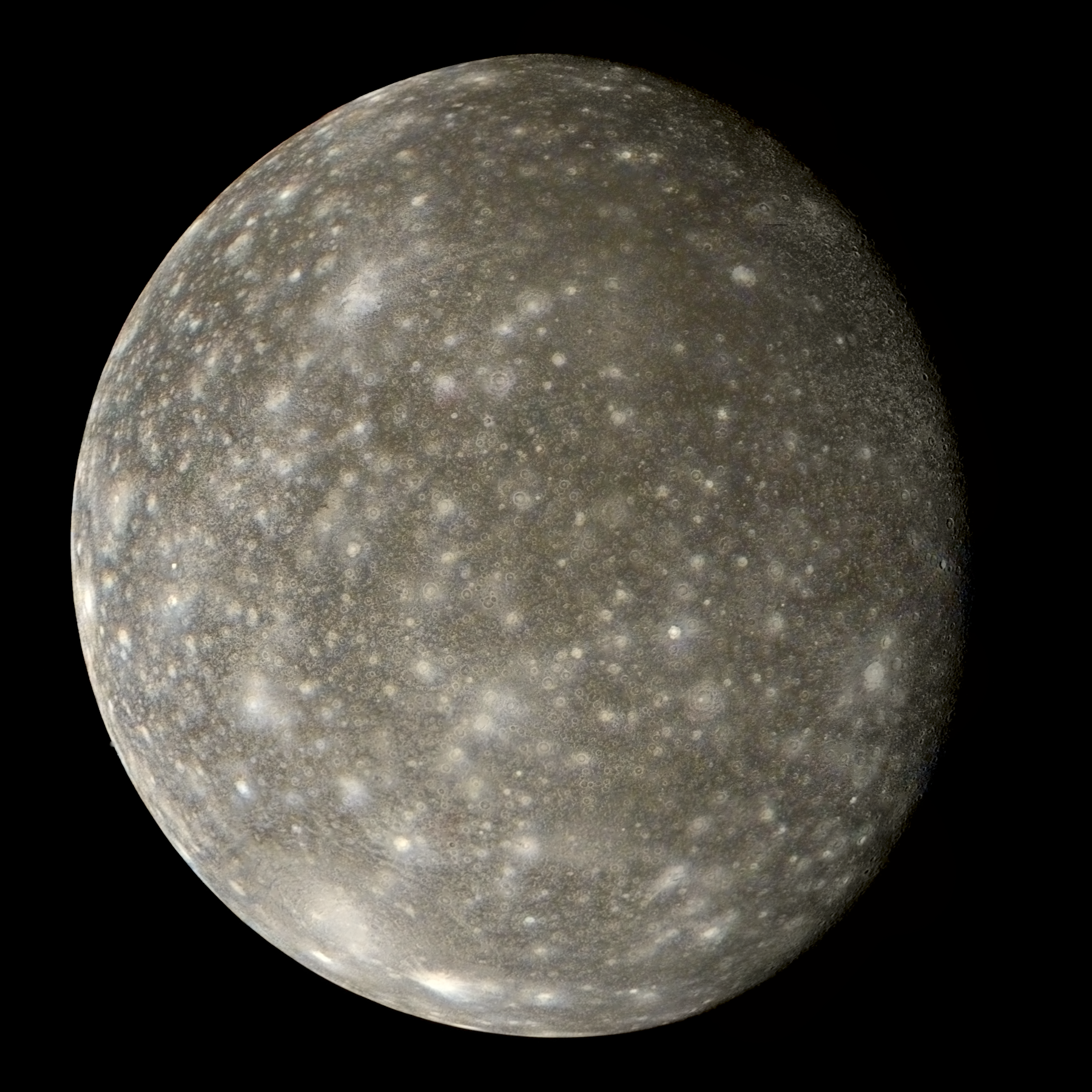
Callisto
(moon of Jupiter)

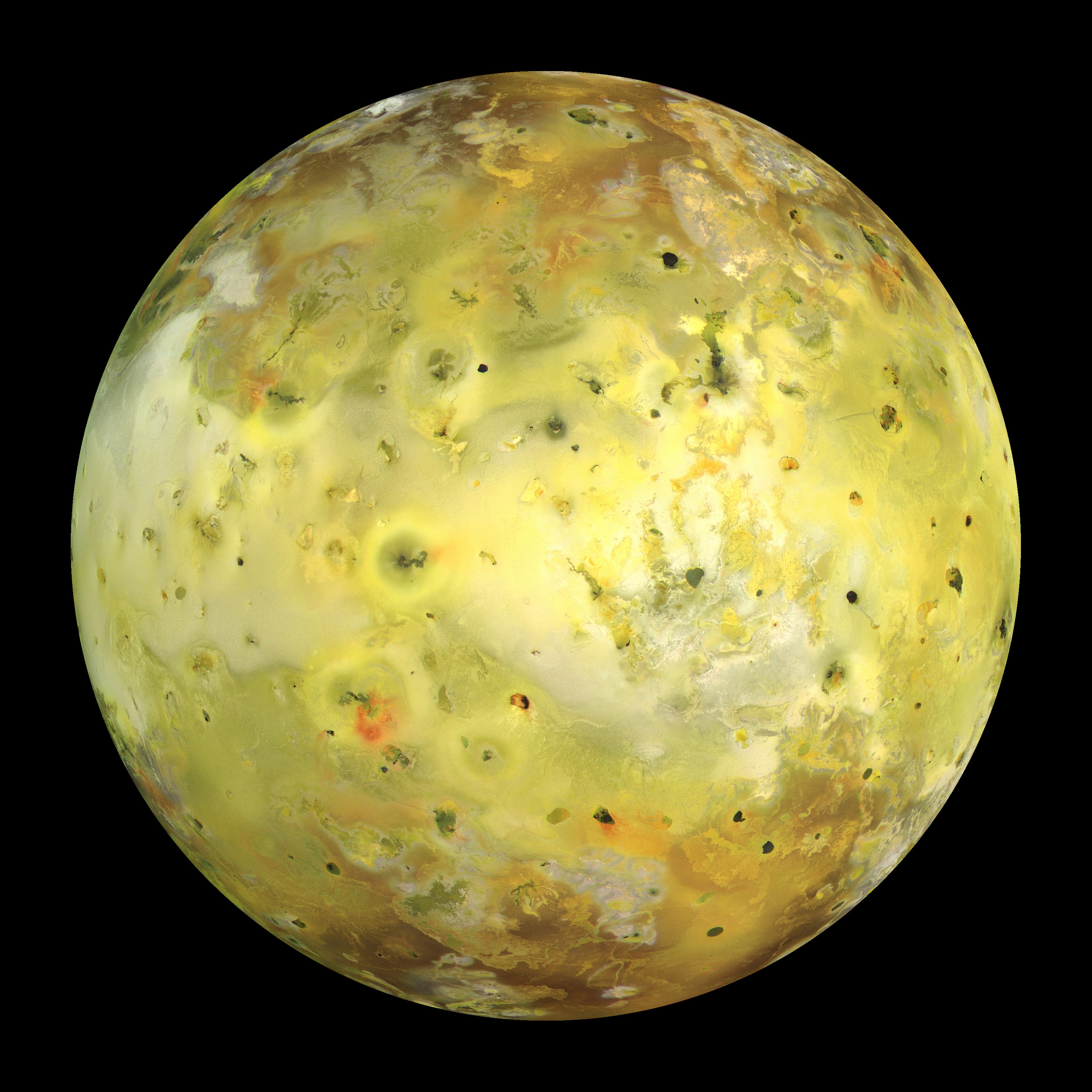
Io
(moon of Jupiter)

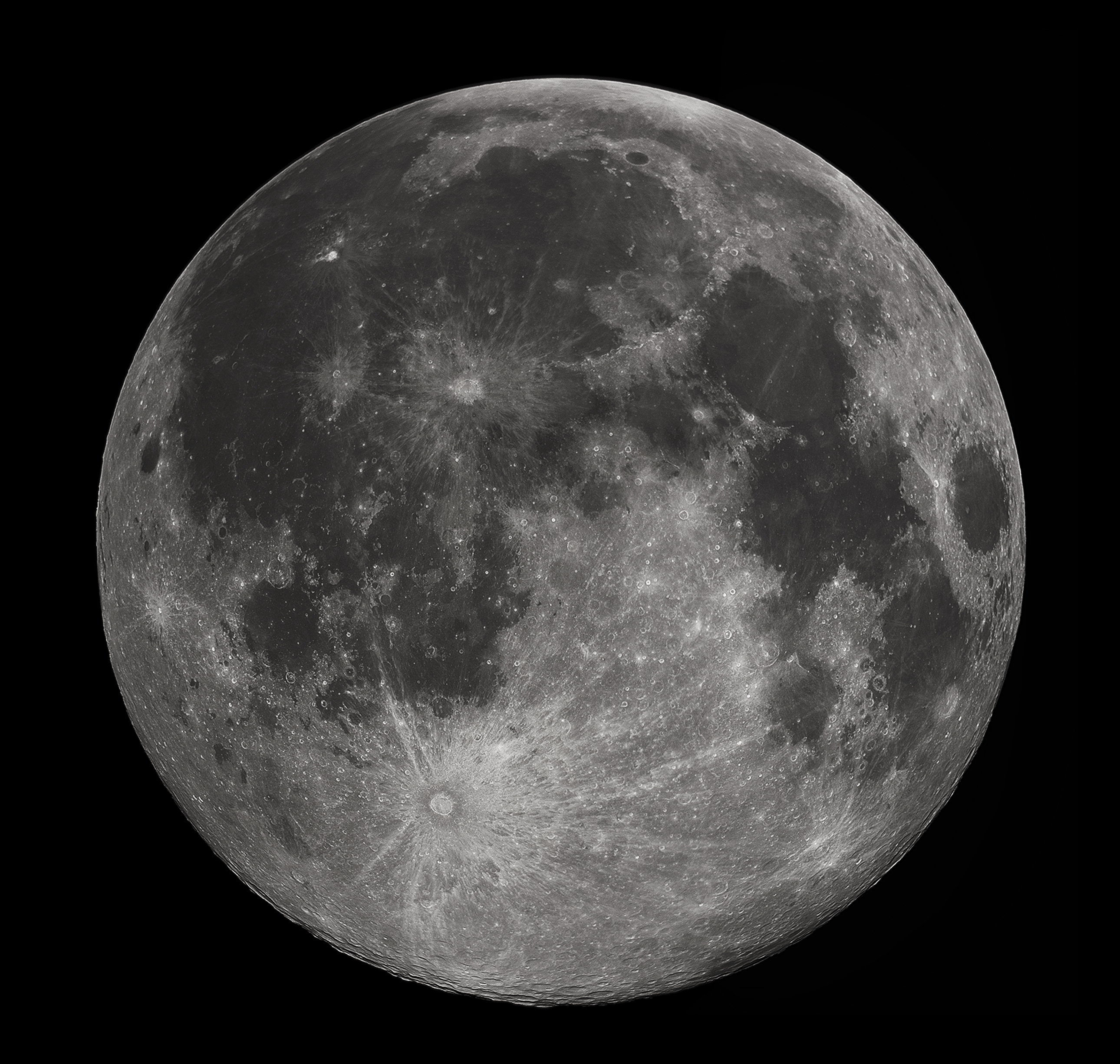
Moon
(moon of Earth)

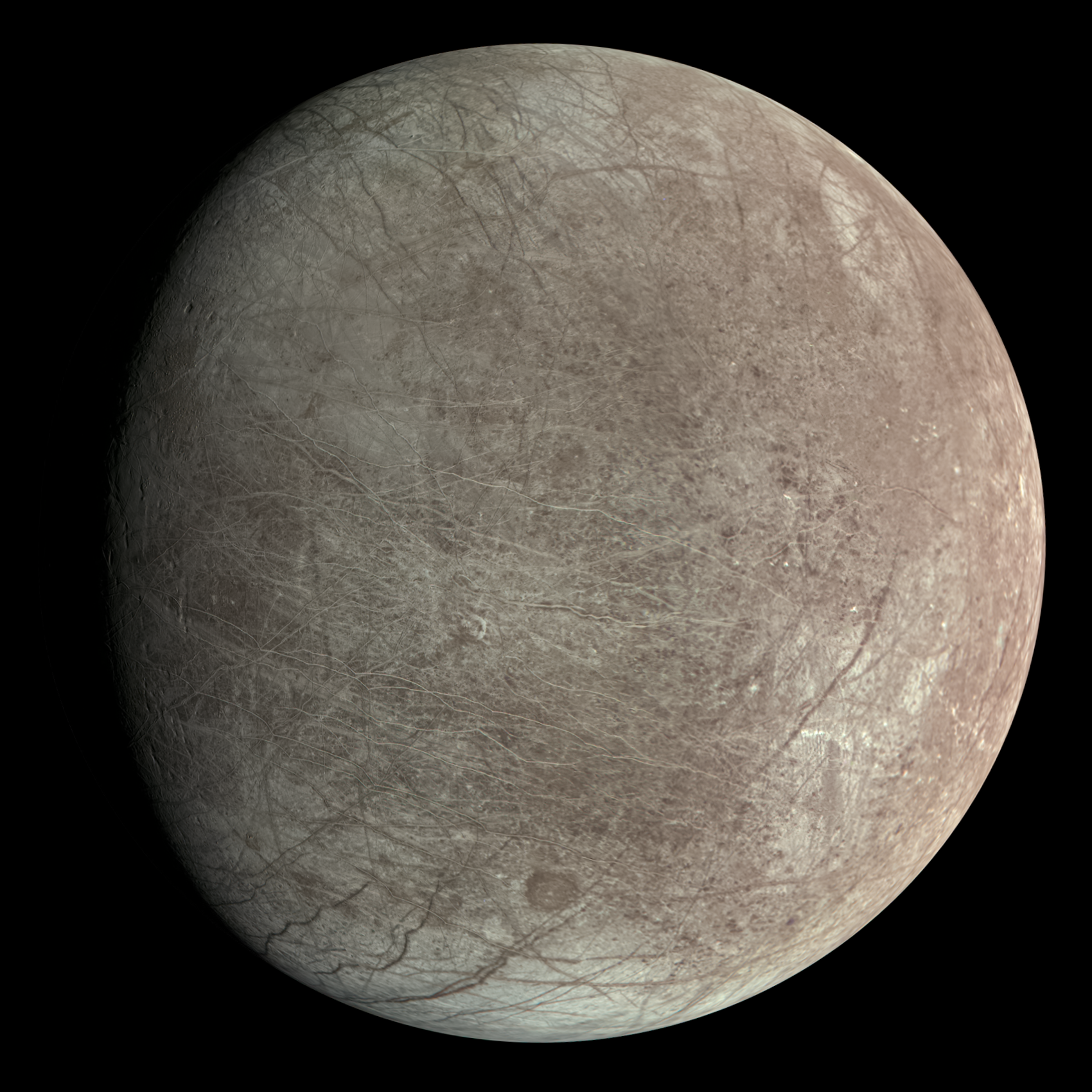
Europa
(moon of Jupiter)

Triton
(moon of Neptune)

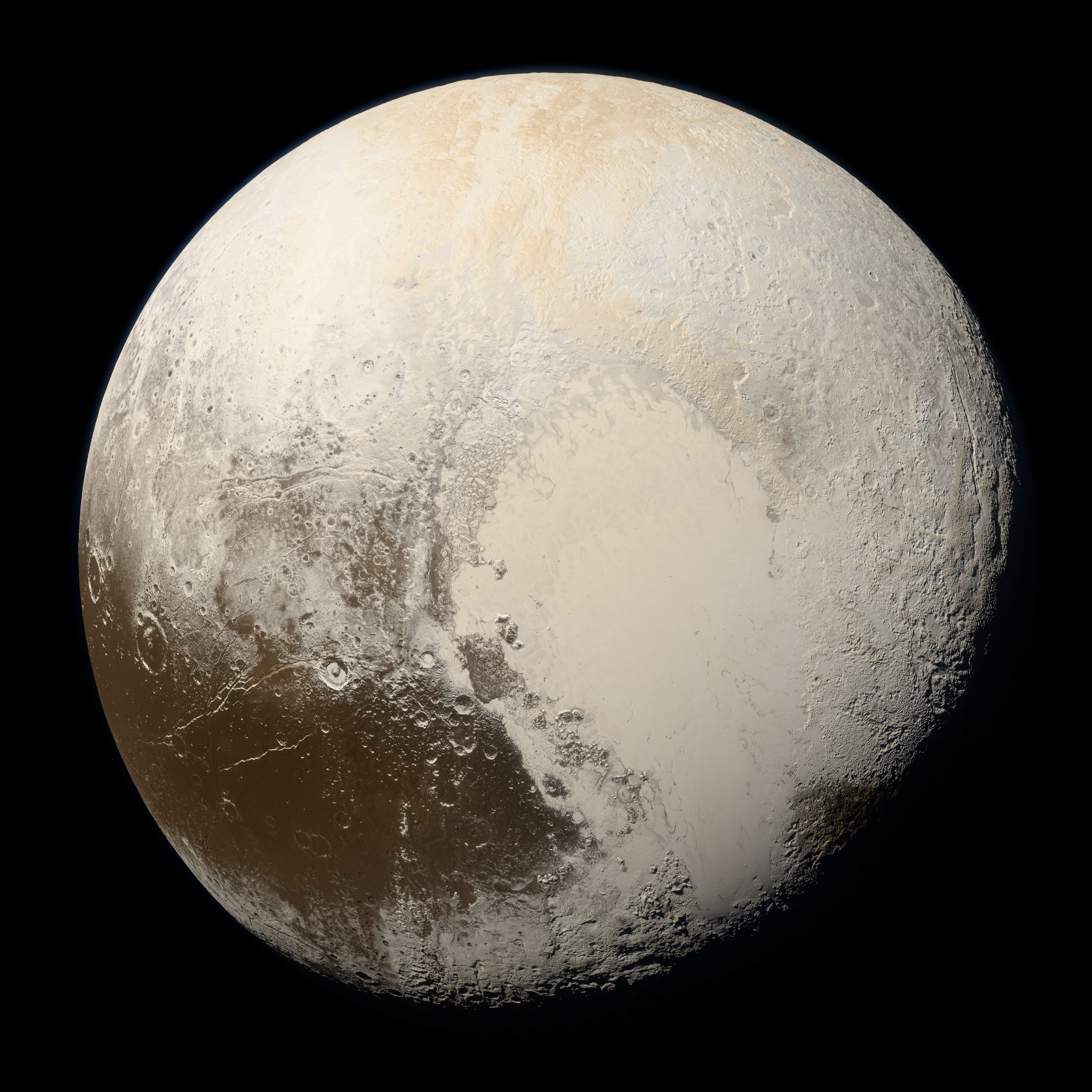
Pluto
(dwarf planet)

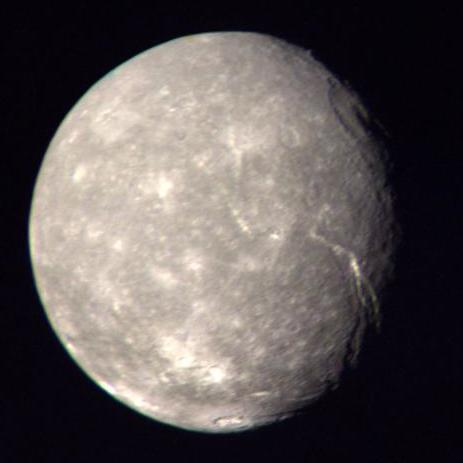
Titania
(moon of Uranus)

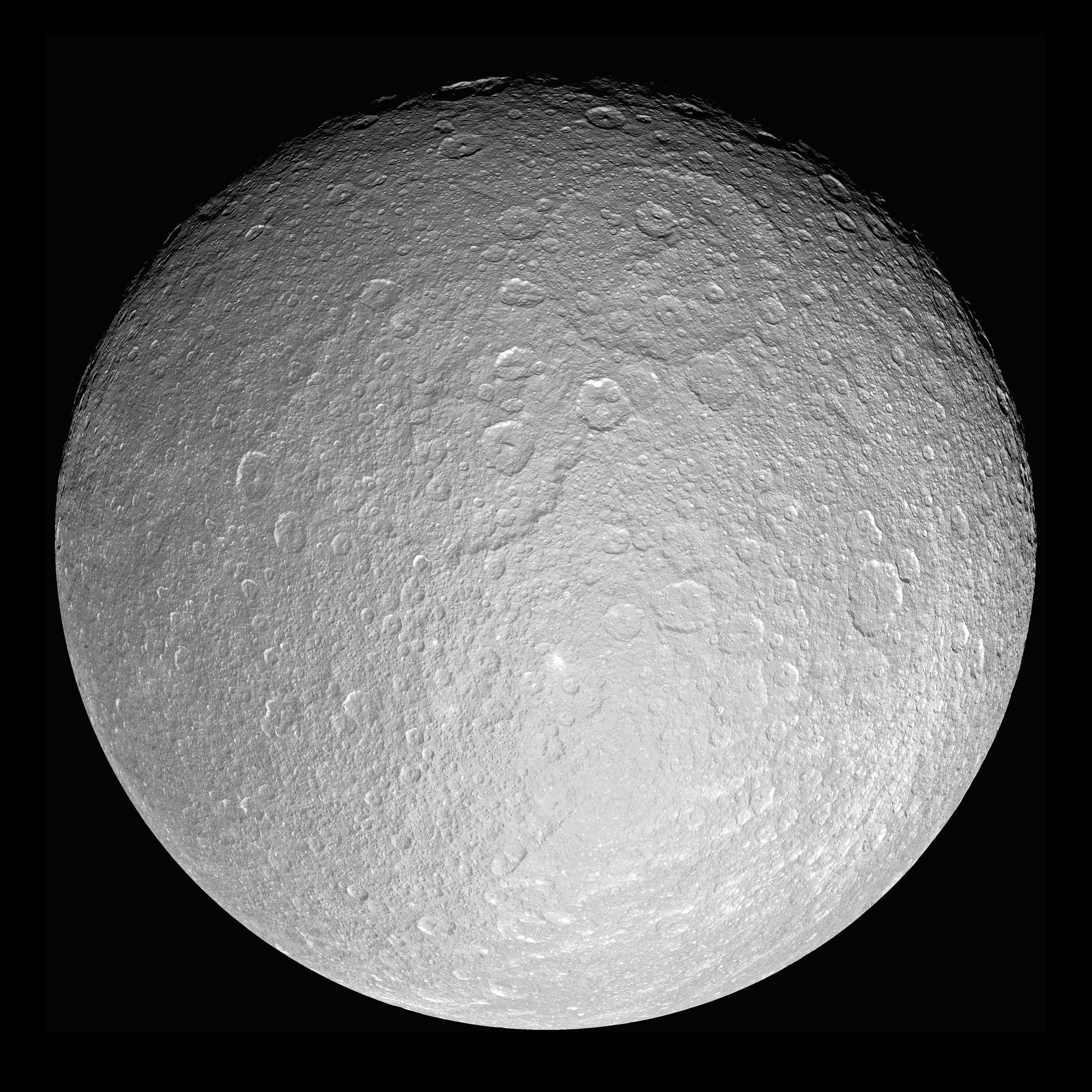
Rhea
(moon of Saturn)

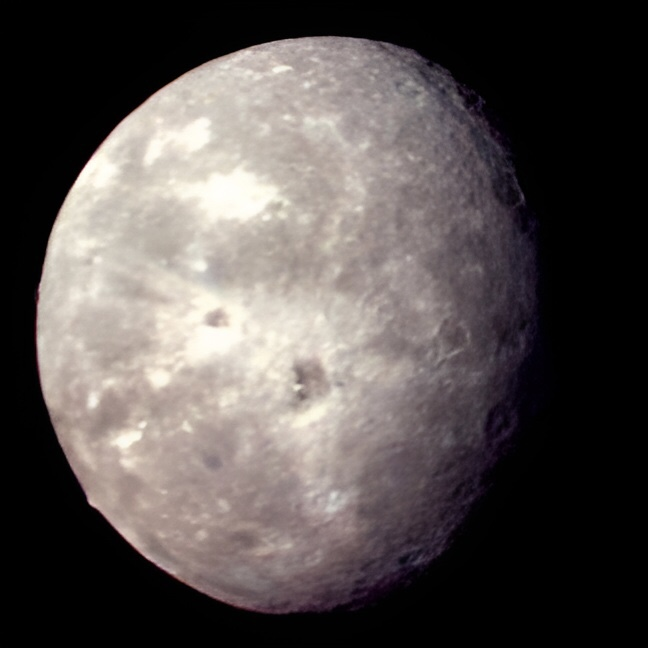
Oberon
(moon of Uranus)

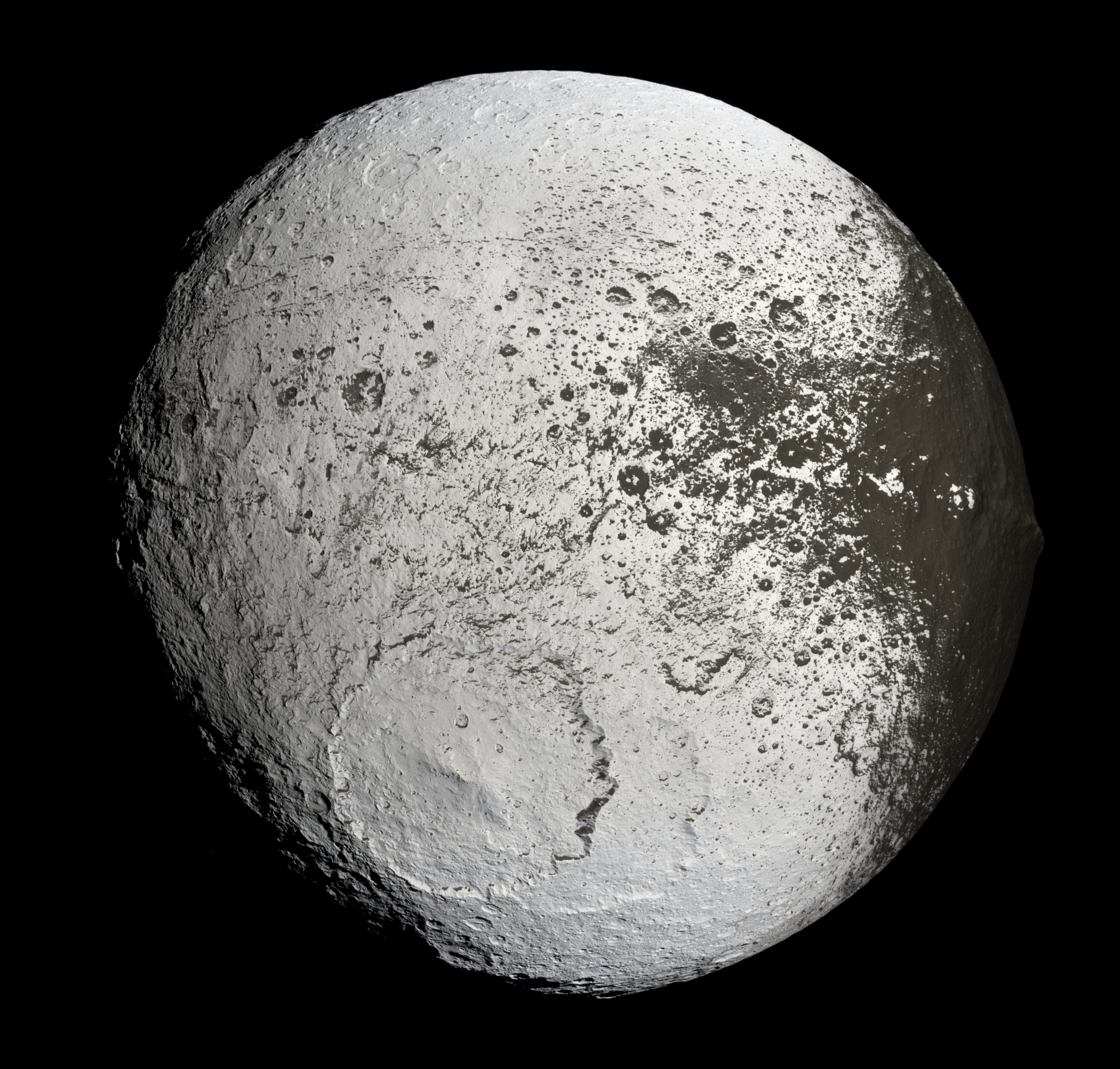
Iapetus
(moon of Saturn)

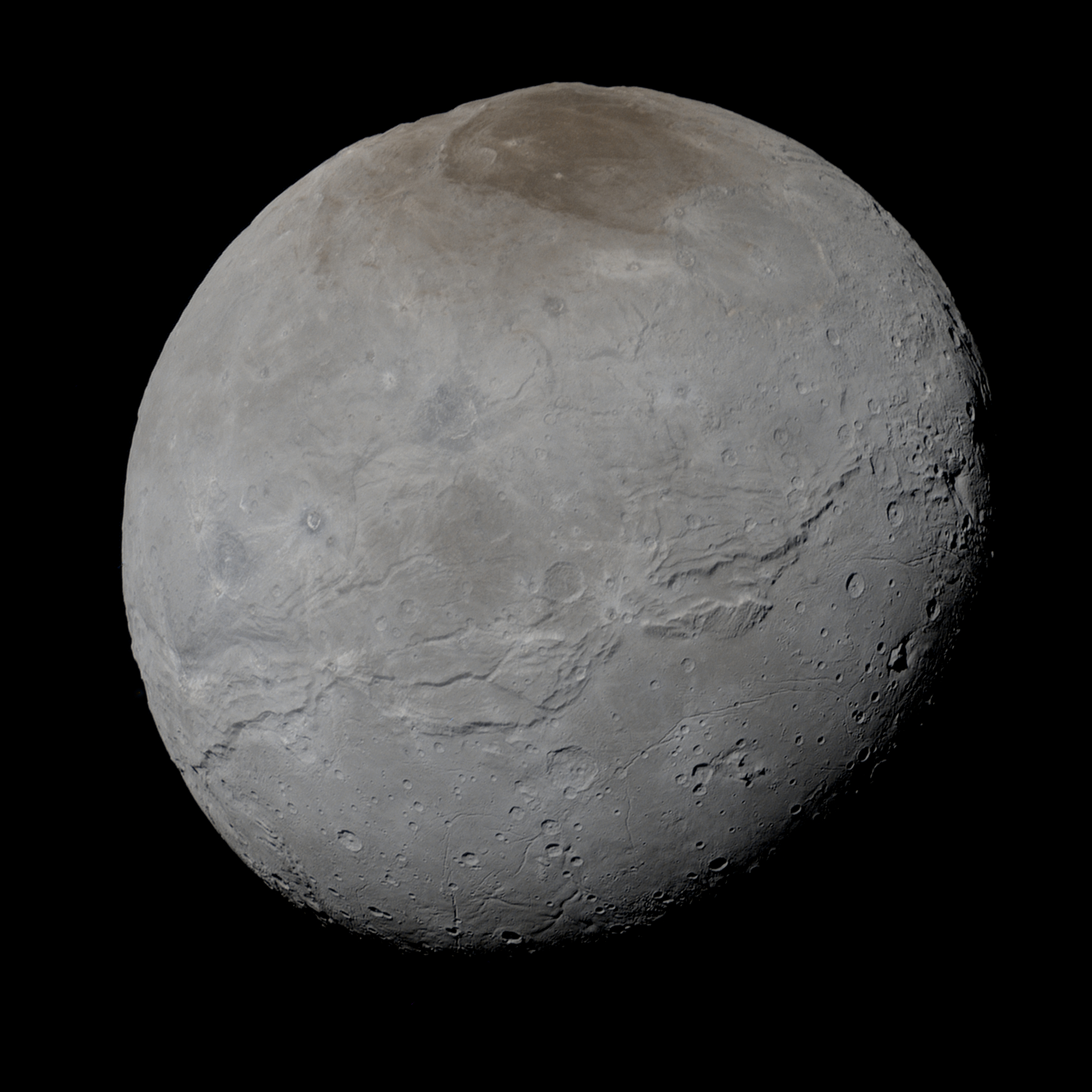
Charon
(moon of Pluto)

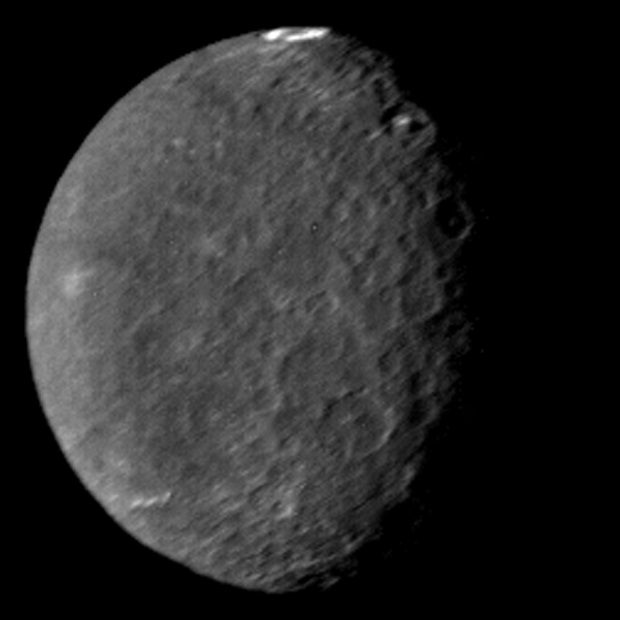
Umbriel
(moon of Uranus)

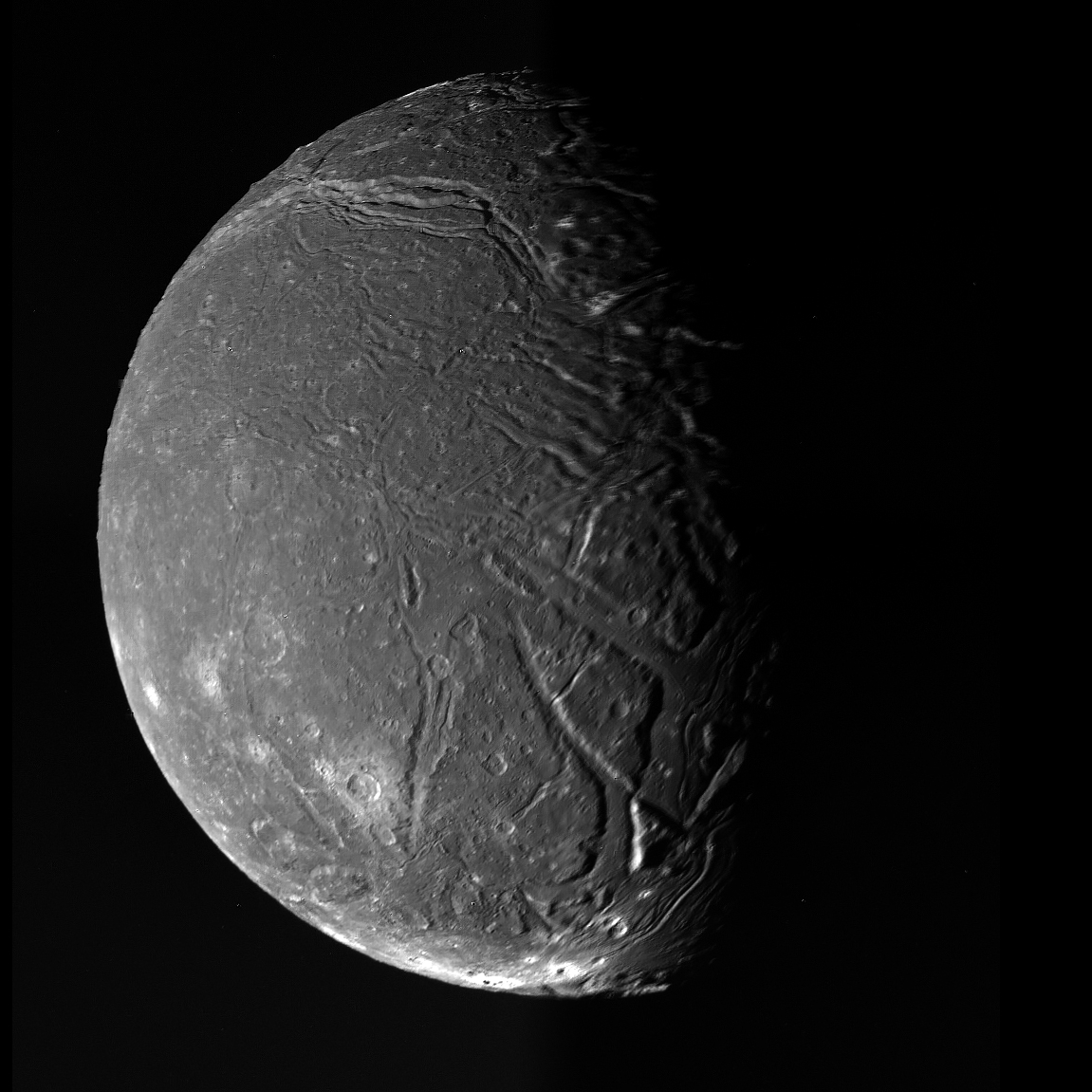
Ariel
(moon of Uranus)

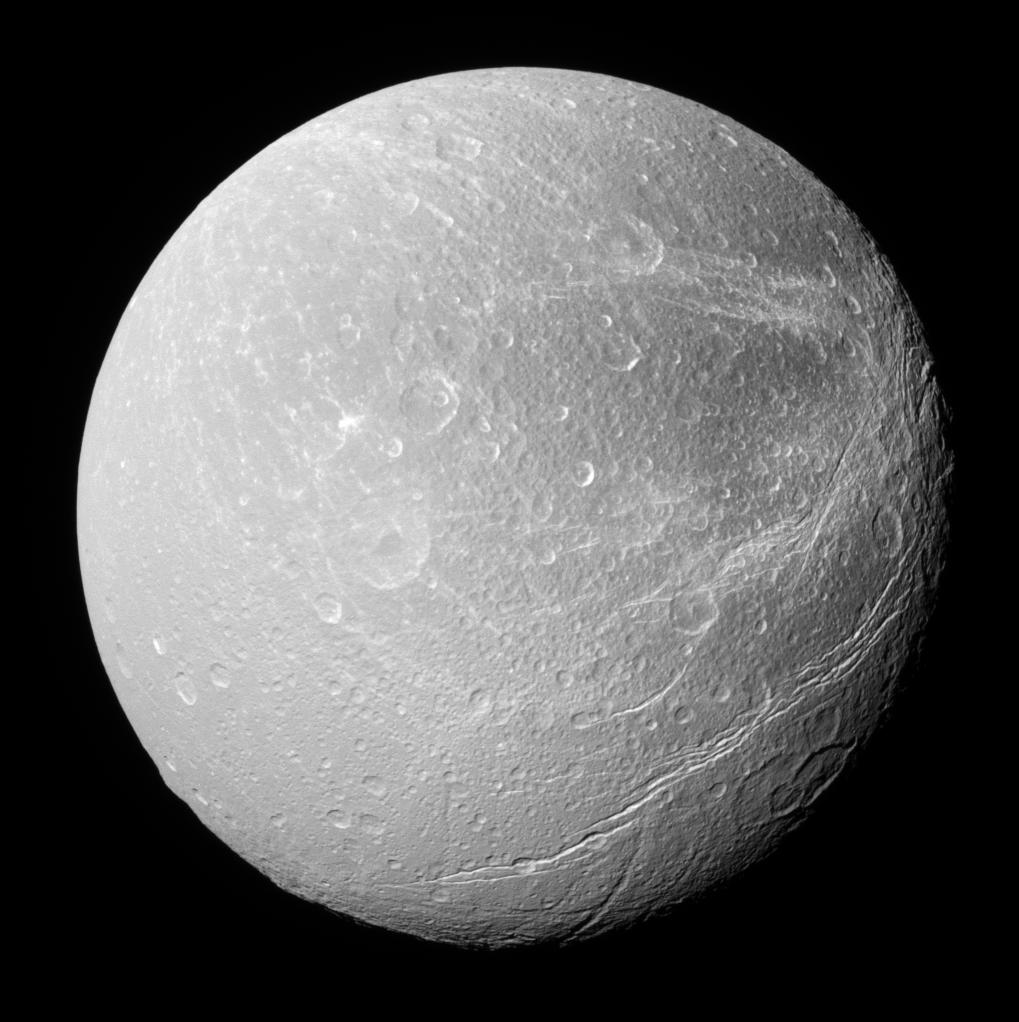
Dione
(moon of Saturn)

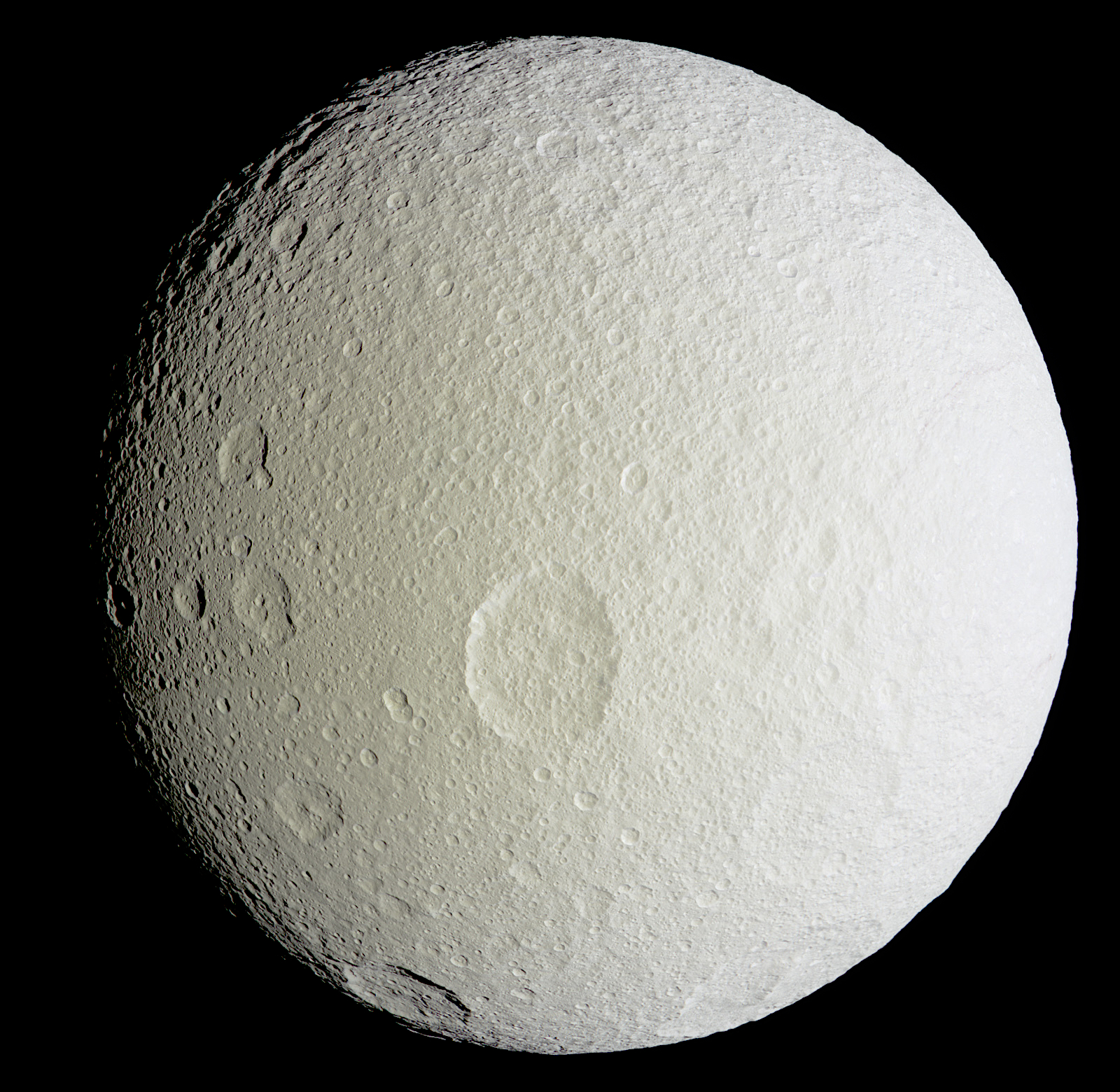
Tethys
(moon of Saturn)

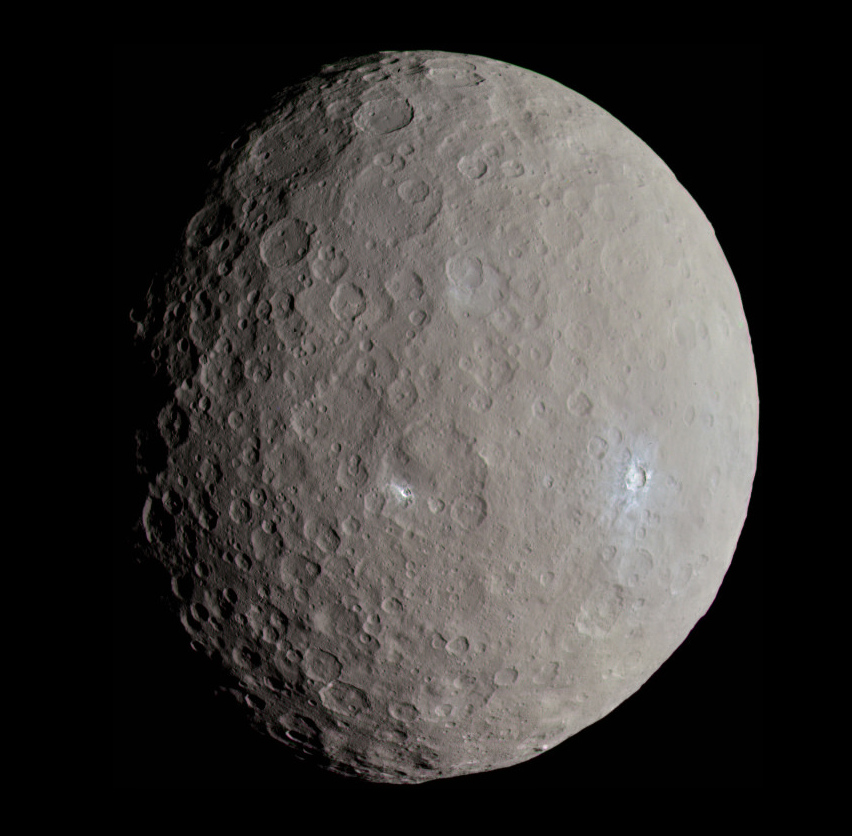
Ceres
(dwarf planet)

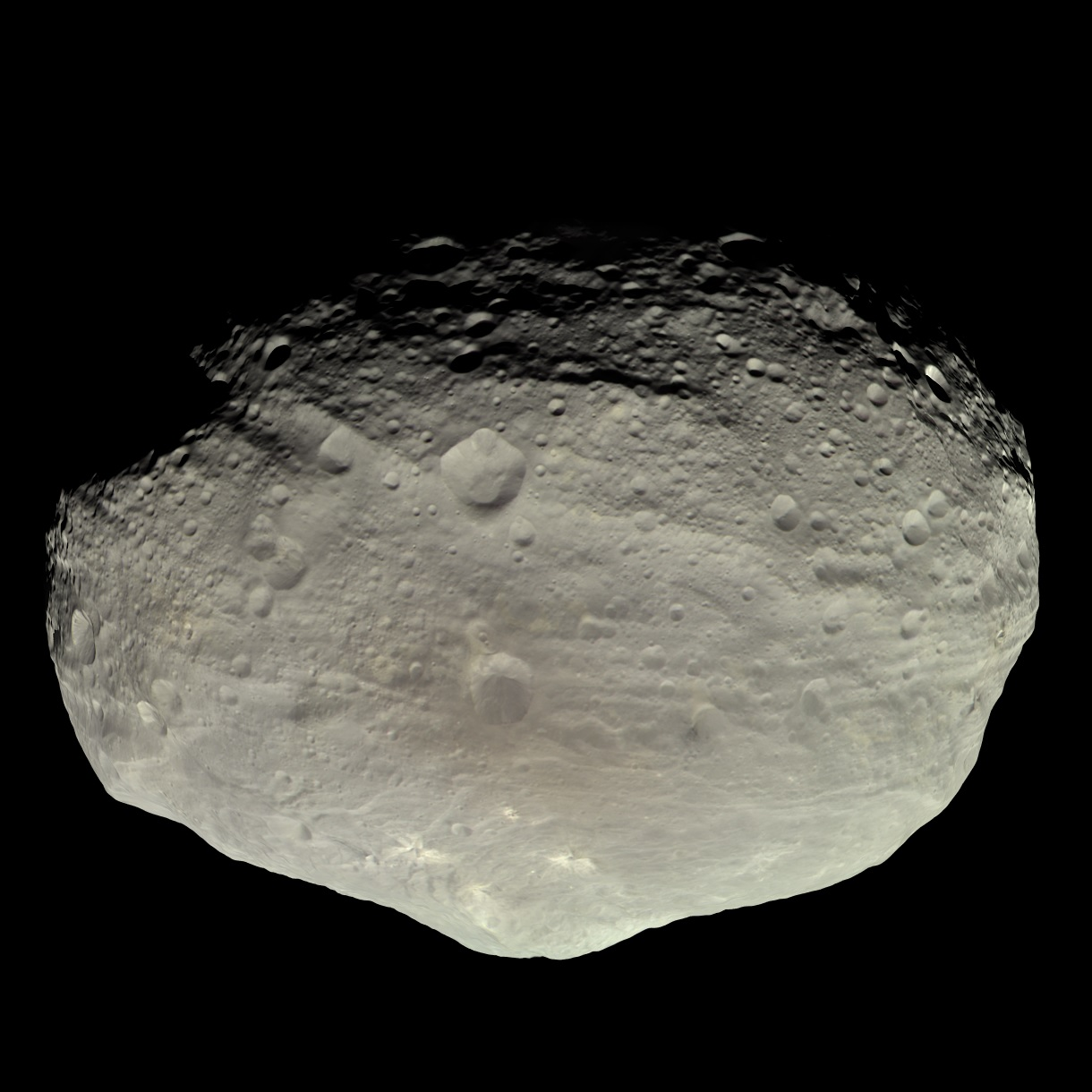
Vesta
(belt asteroid)

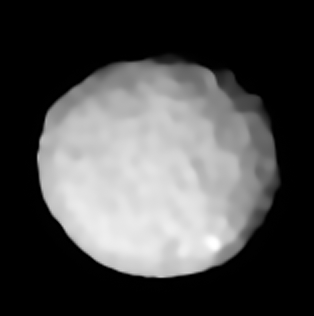
Pallas
(belt asteroid)

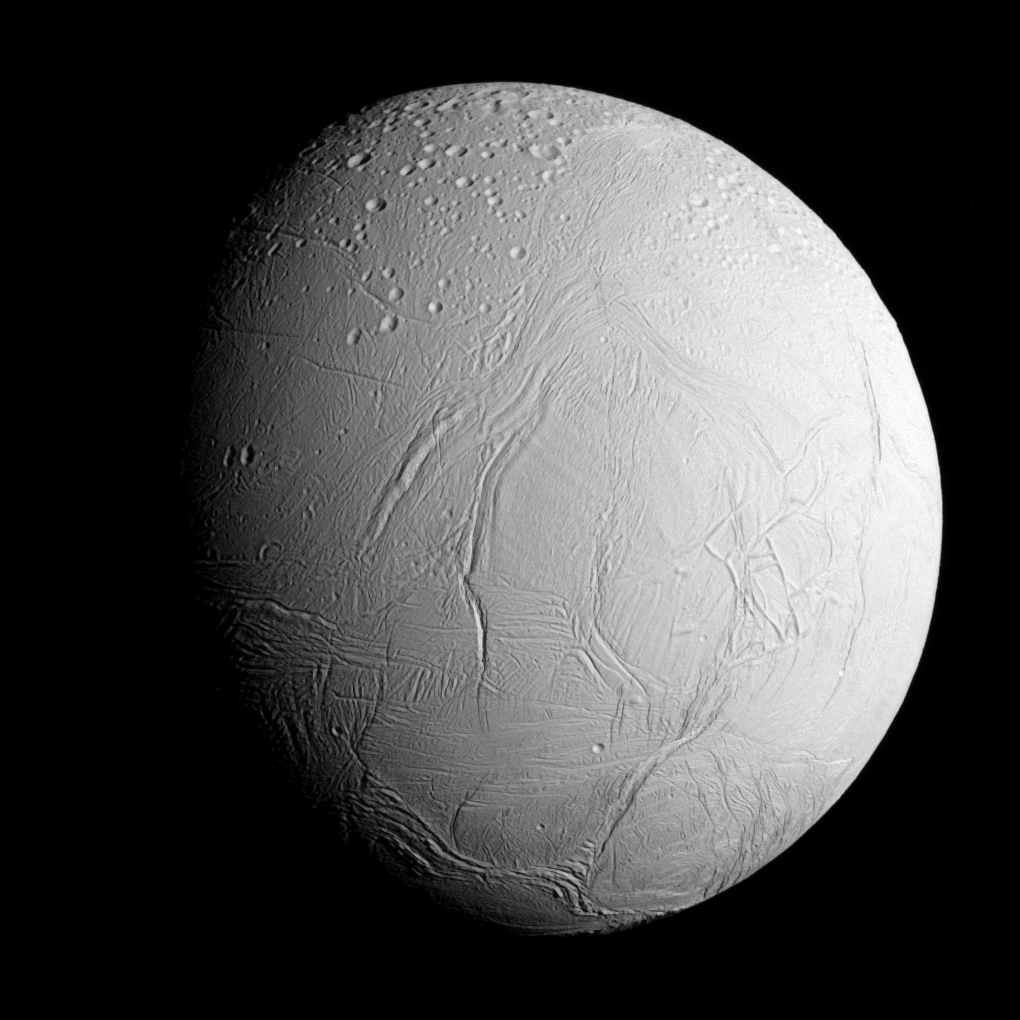
Enceladus
(moon of Saturn)

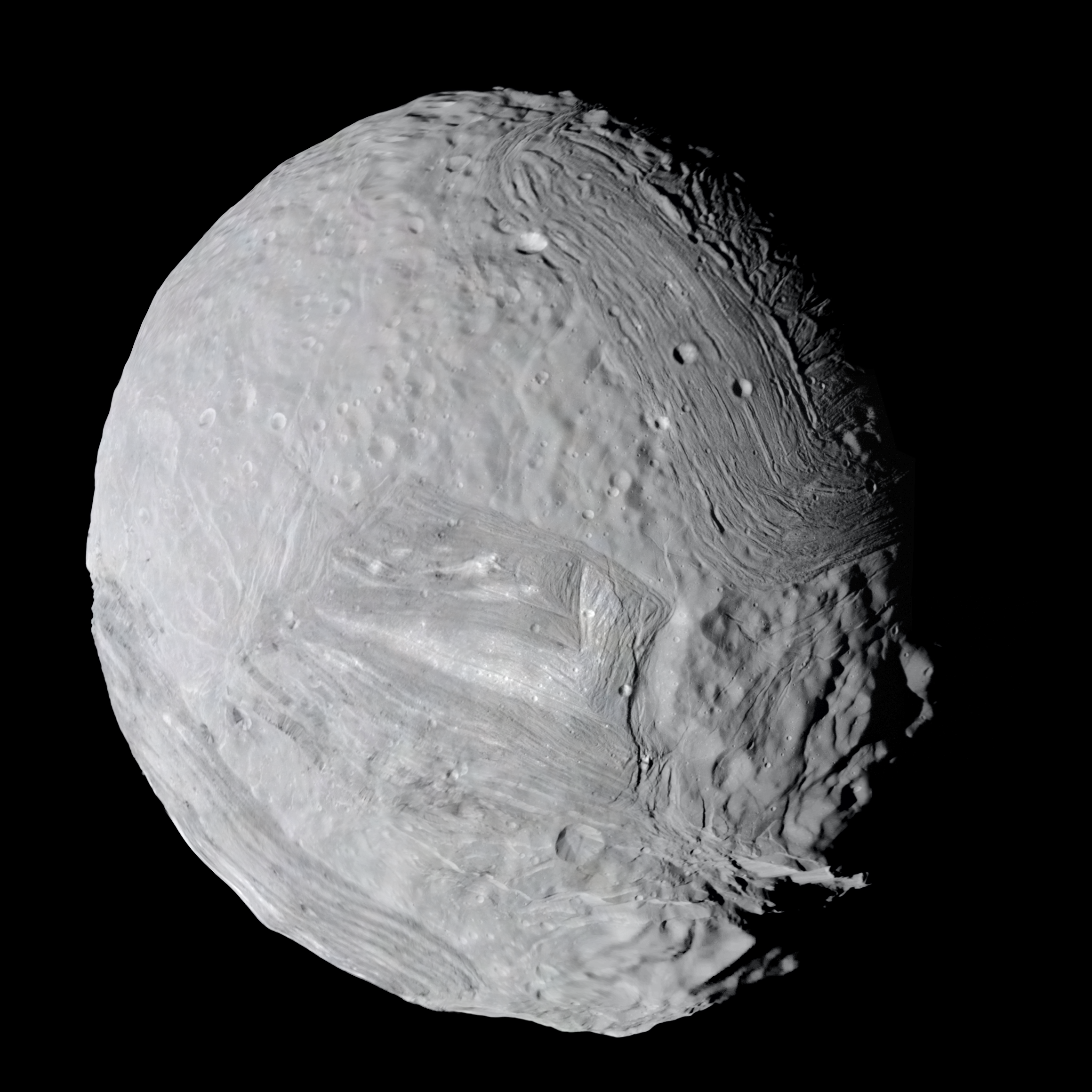
Miranda
(moon of Uranus)

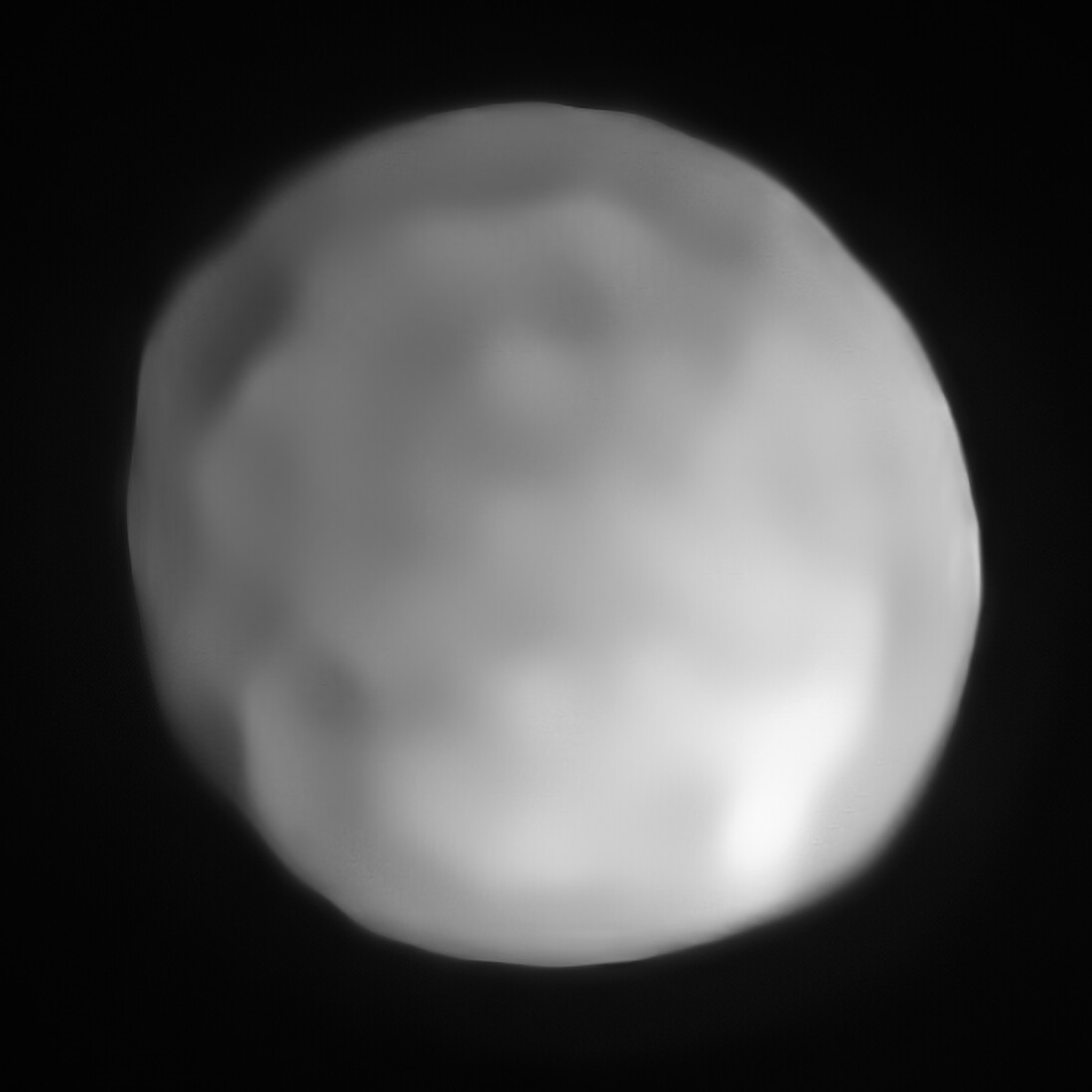
Hygiea
(belt asteroid)

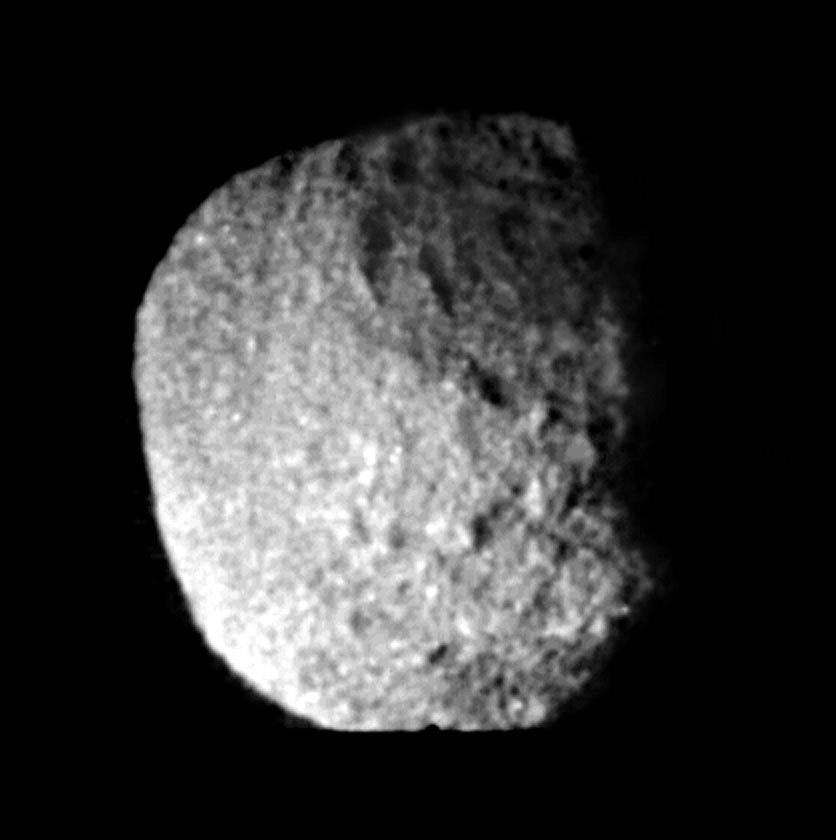
Proteus
(moon of Neptune)

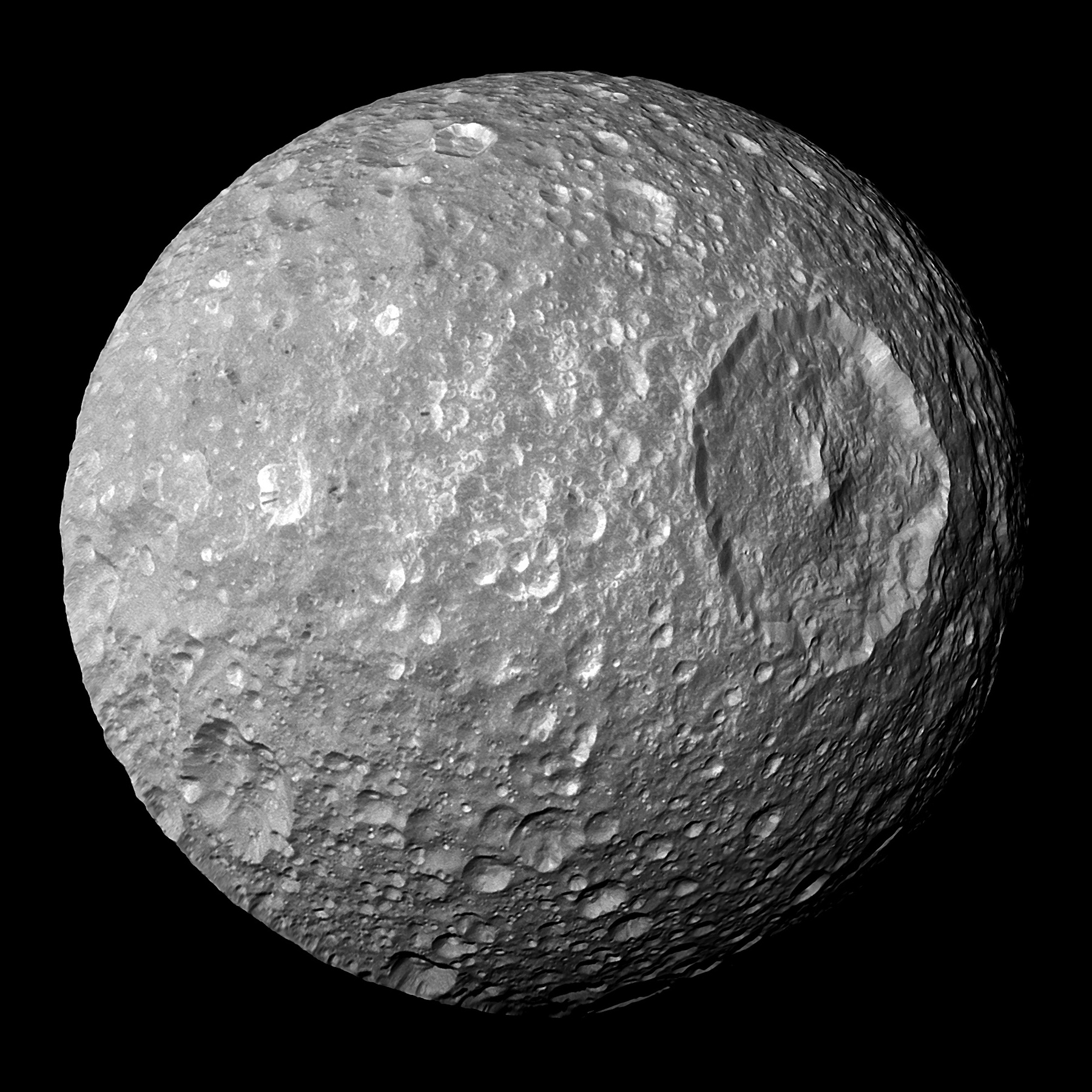
Mimas
(moon of Saturn)

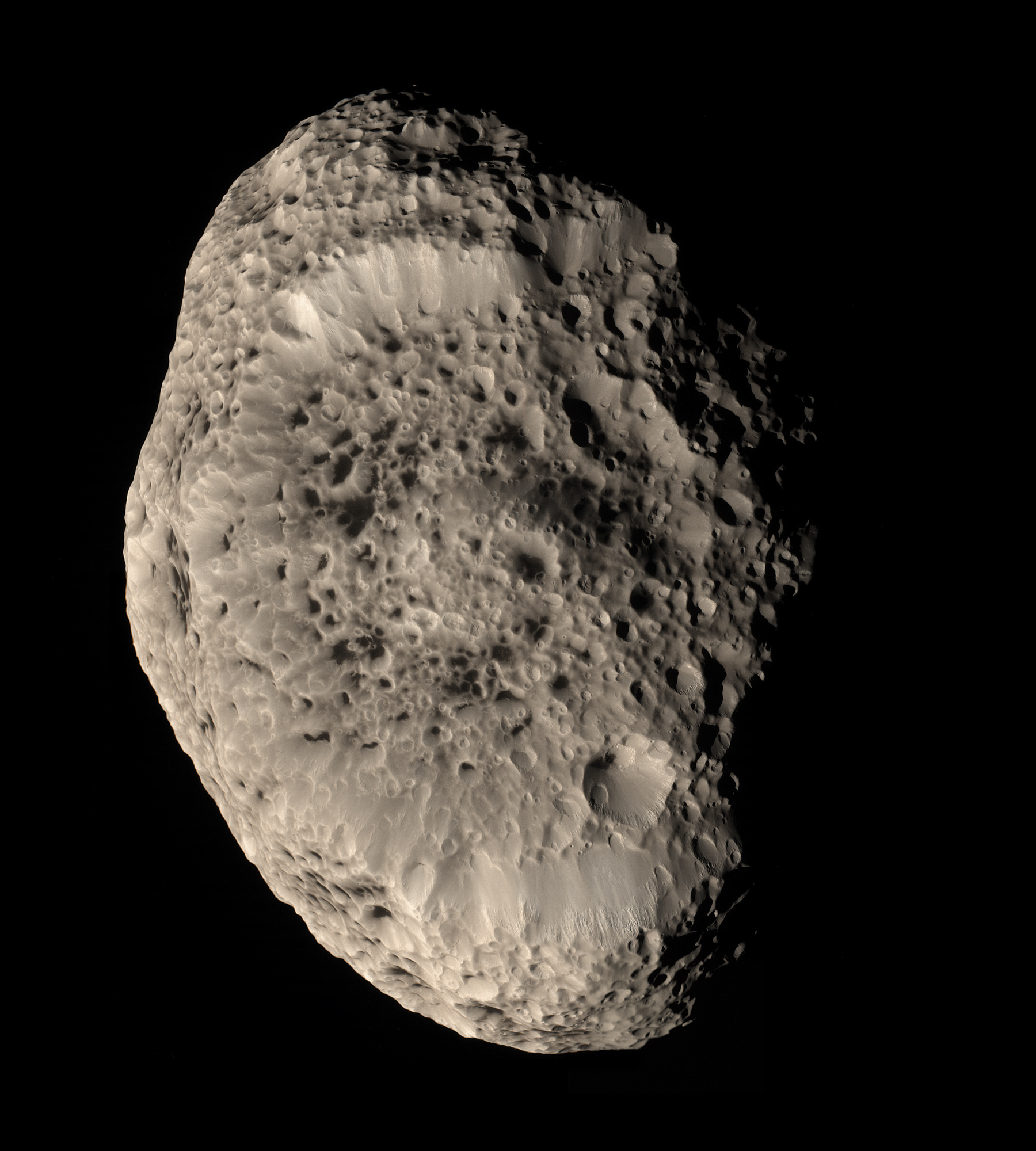
Hyperion
(moon of Saturn)

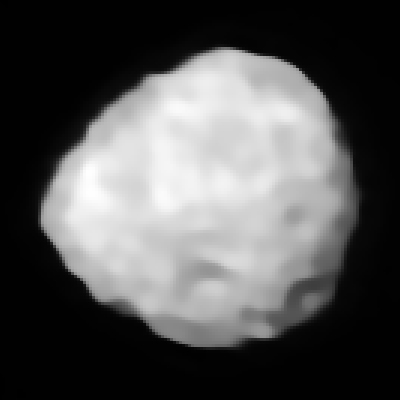
Iris
(belt asteroid)

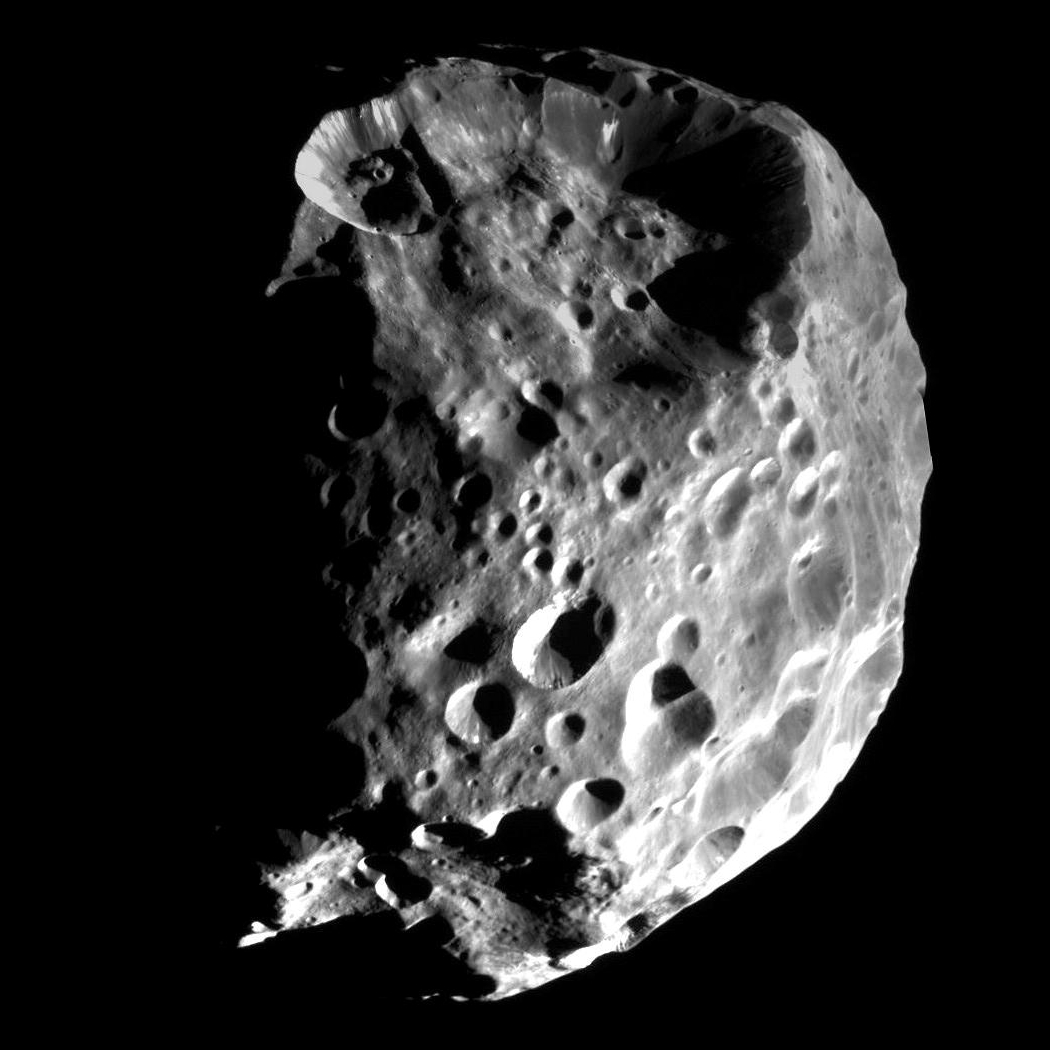
Phoebe
(moon of Saturn)

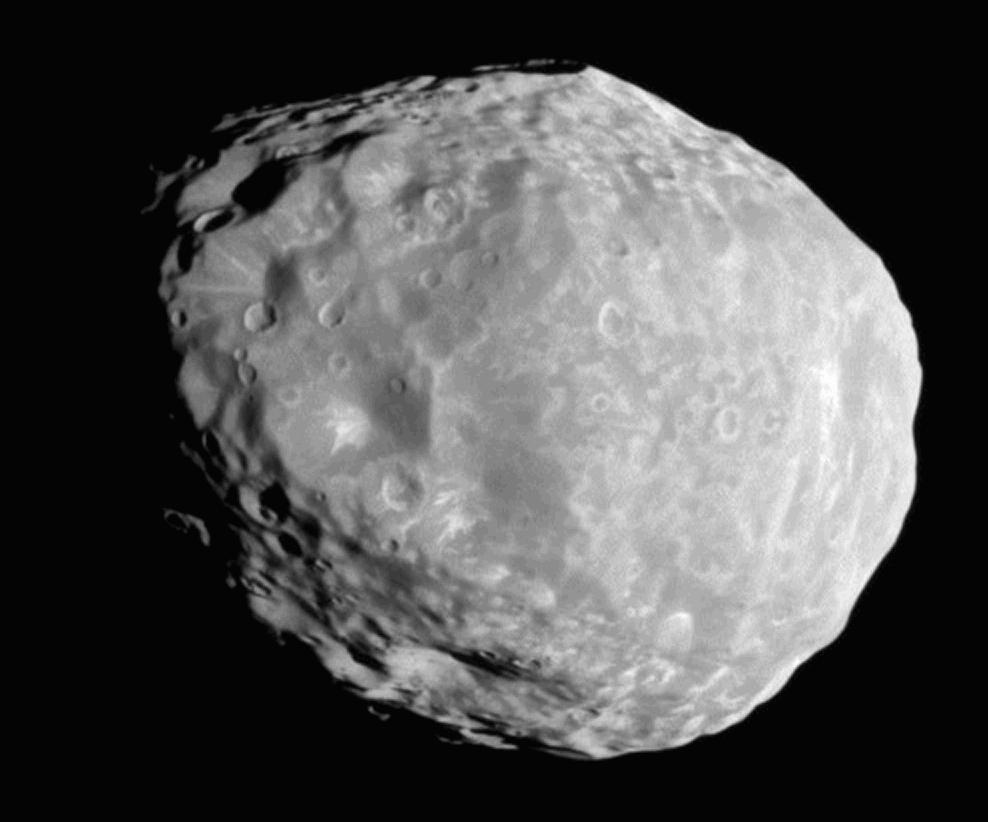
Janus
(moon of Saturn)

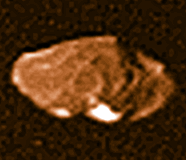
Amalthea
(moon of Jupiter)

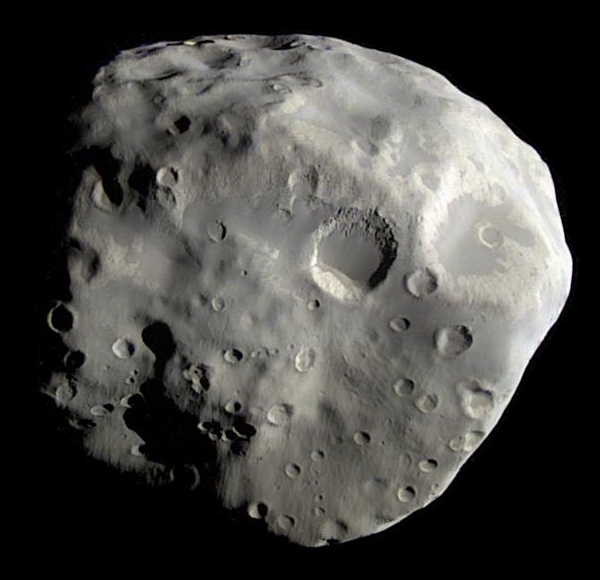
Epimetheus
(moon of Saturn)

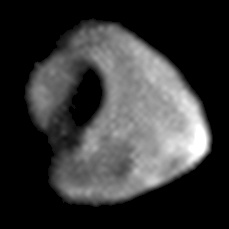
Thebe
(moon of Jupiter)

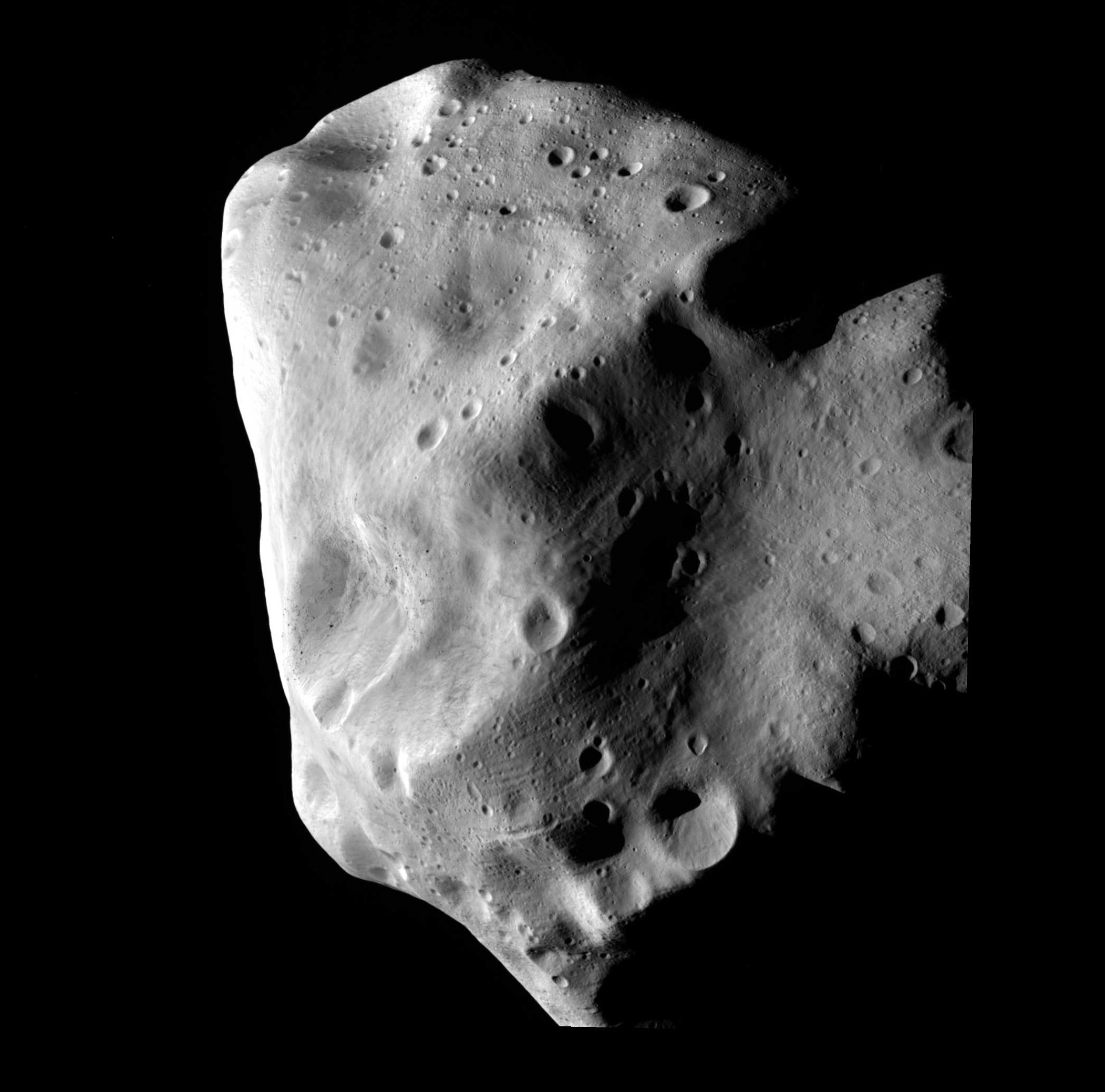
Lutetia
(belt asteroid)

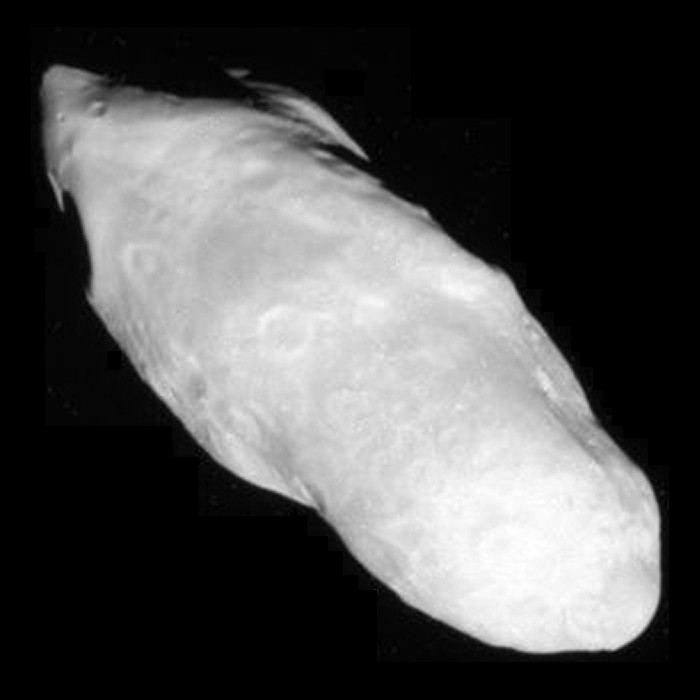
Prometheus
(moon of Saturn)

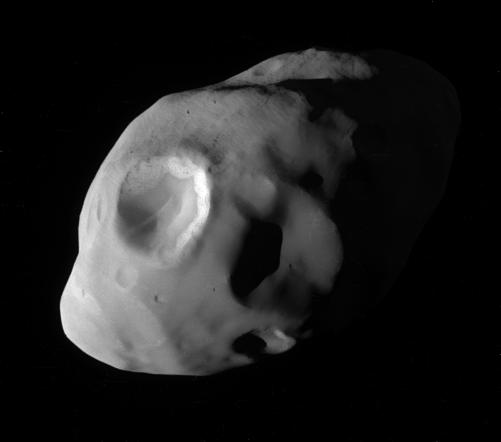
Pandora
(moon of Saturn)

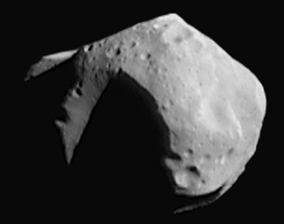
Mathilde
(belt asteroid)

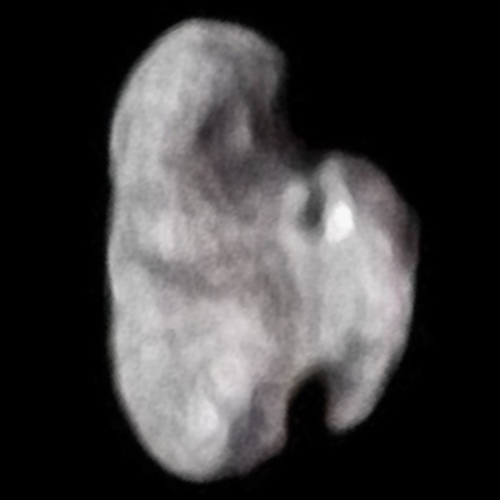
Hydra
(moon of Pluto)

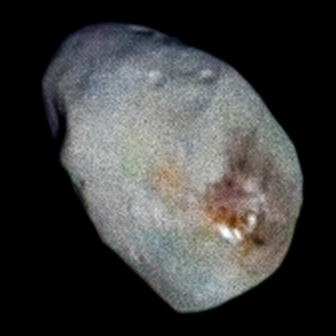
Nix
(moon of Pluto)

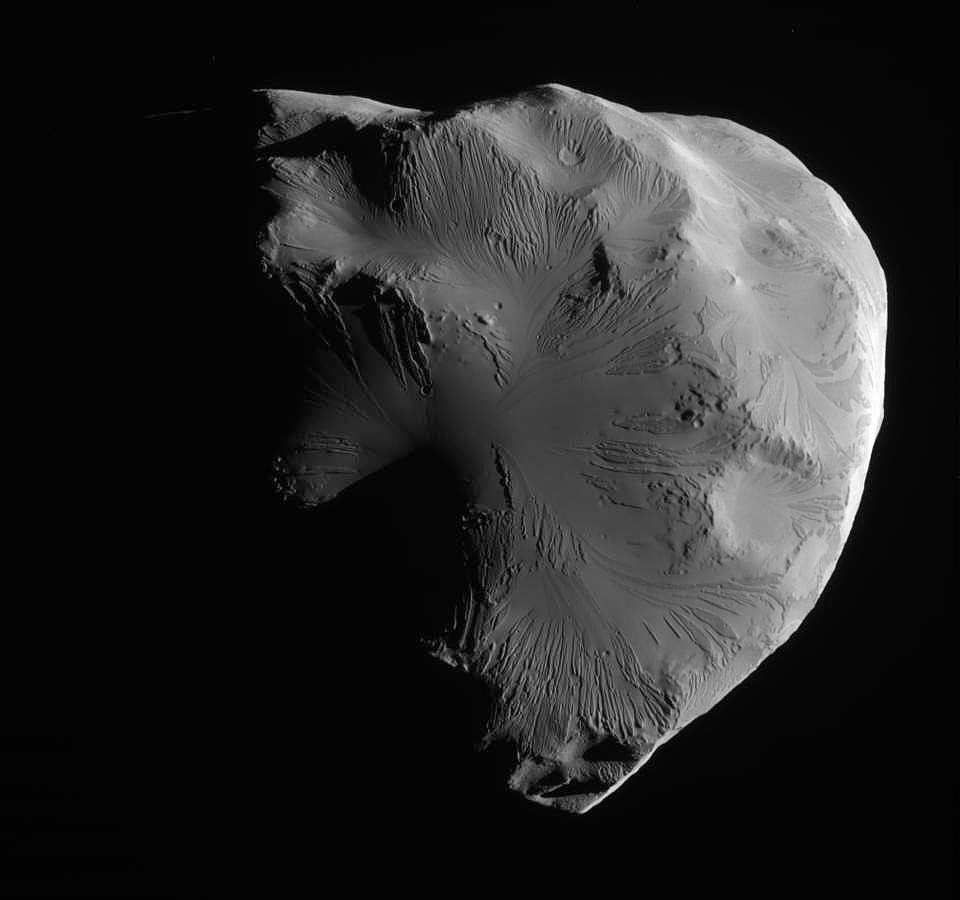
Helene
(moon of Saturn)

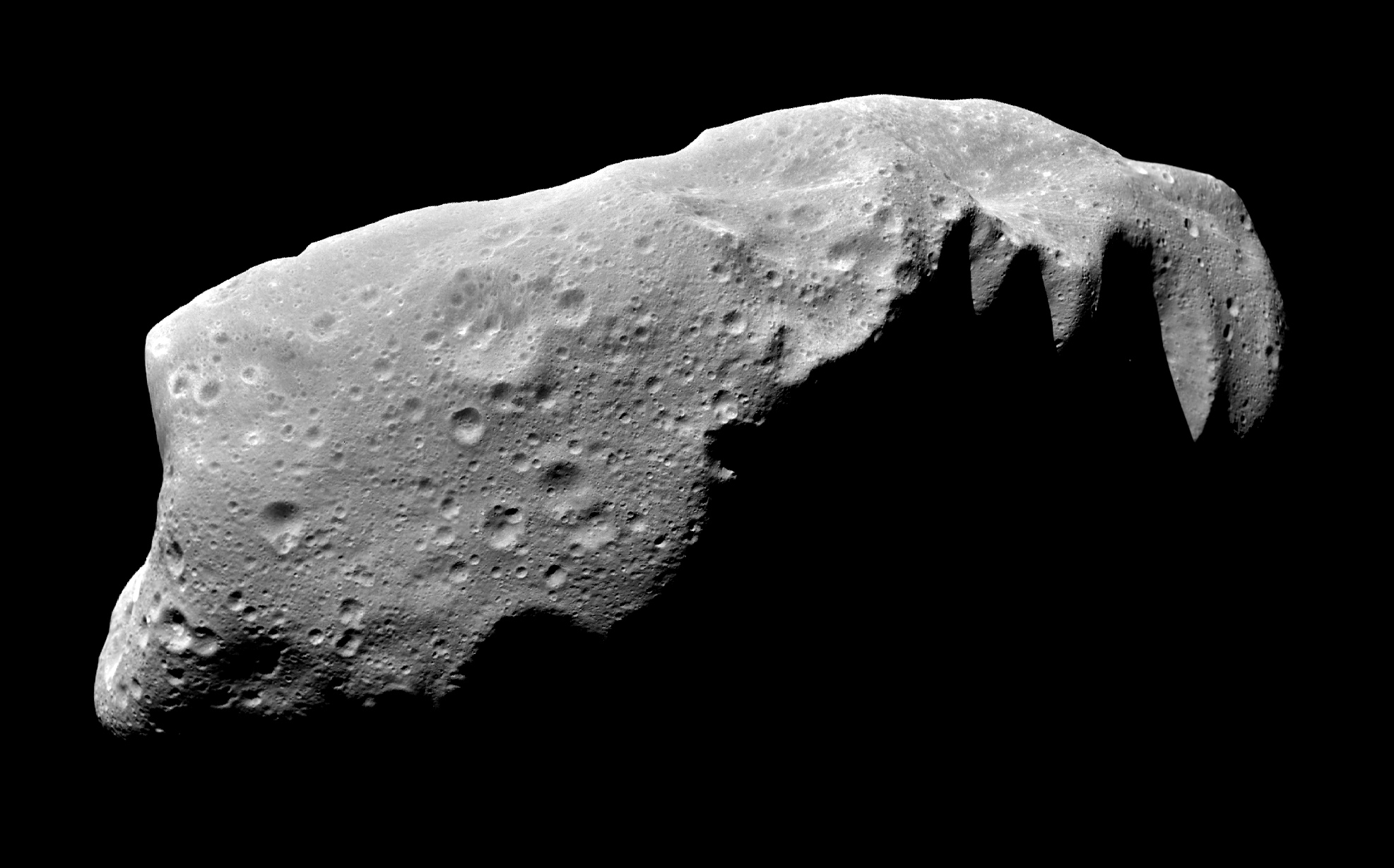
Ida
(belt asteroid)

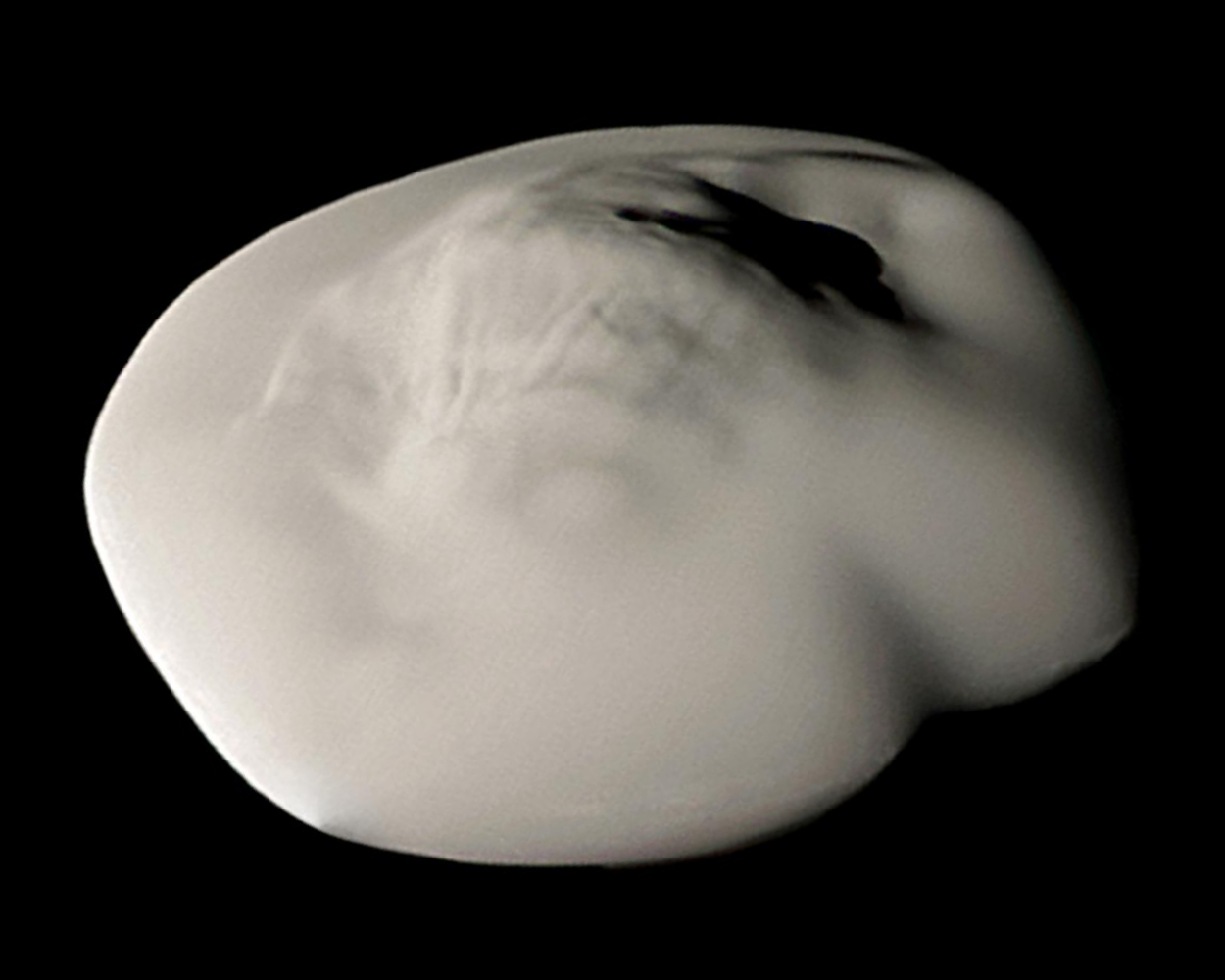
Atlas
(moon of Saturn)

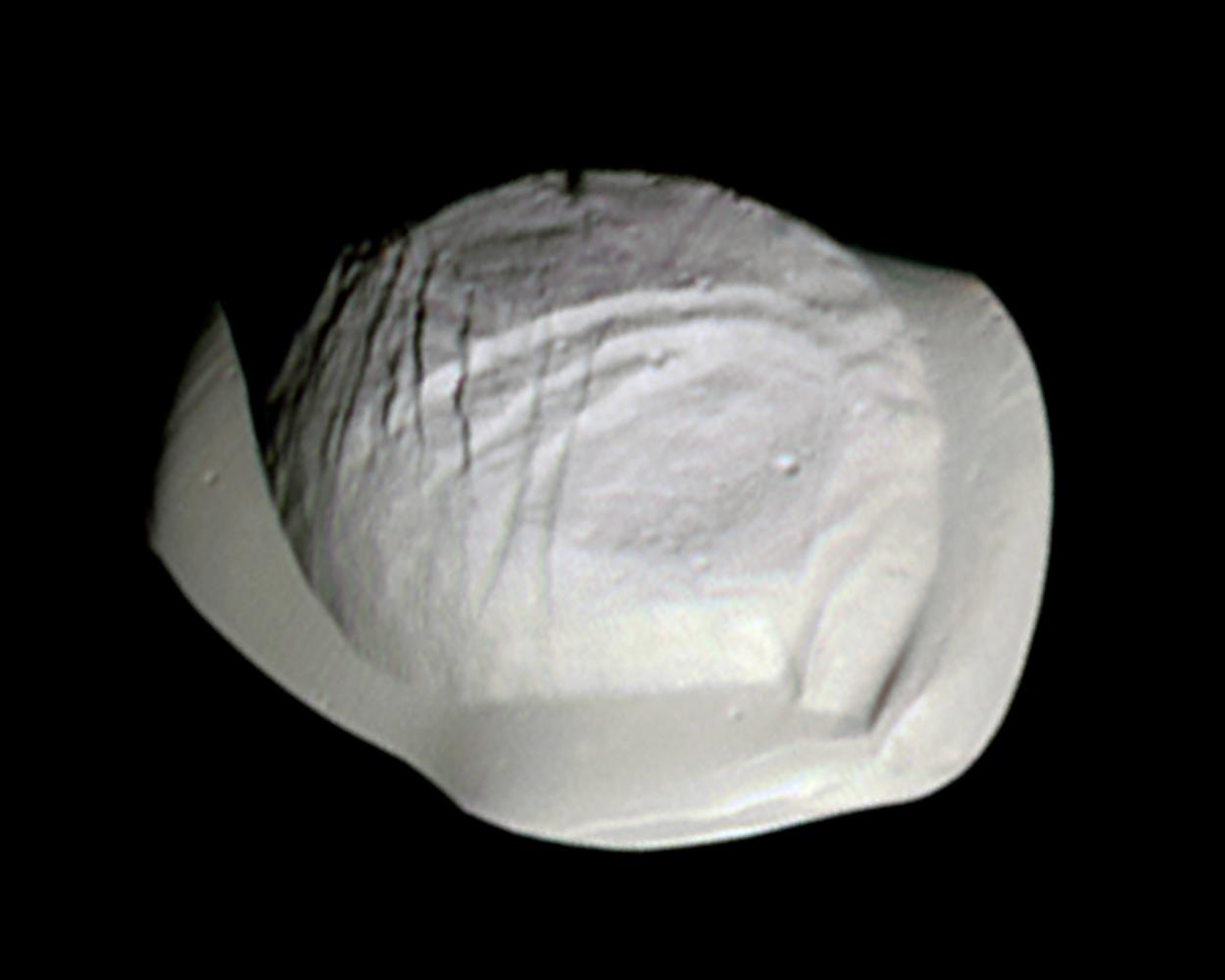
Pan
(moon of Saturn)

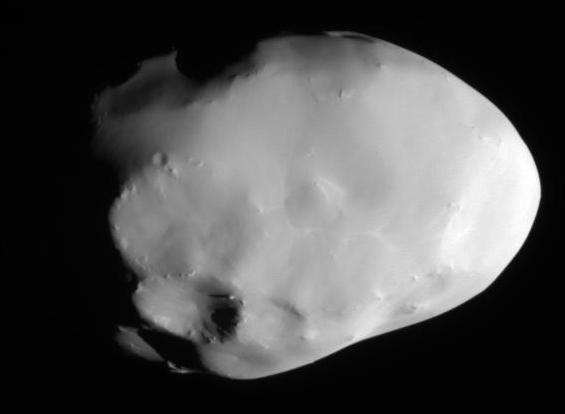
Telesto
(moon of Saturn)

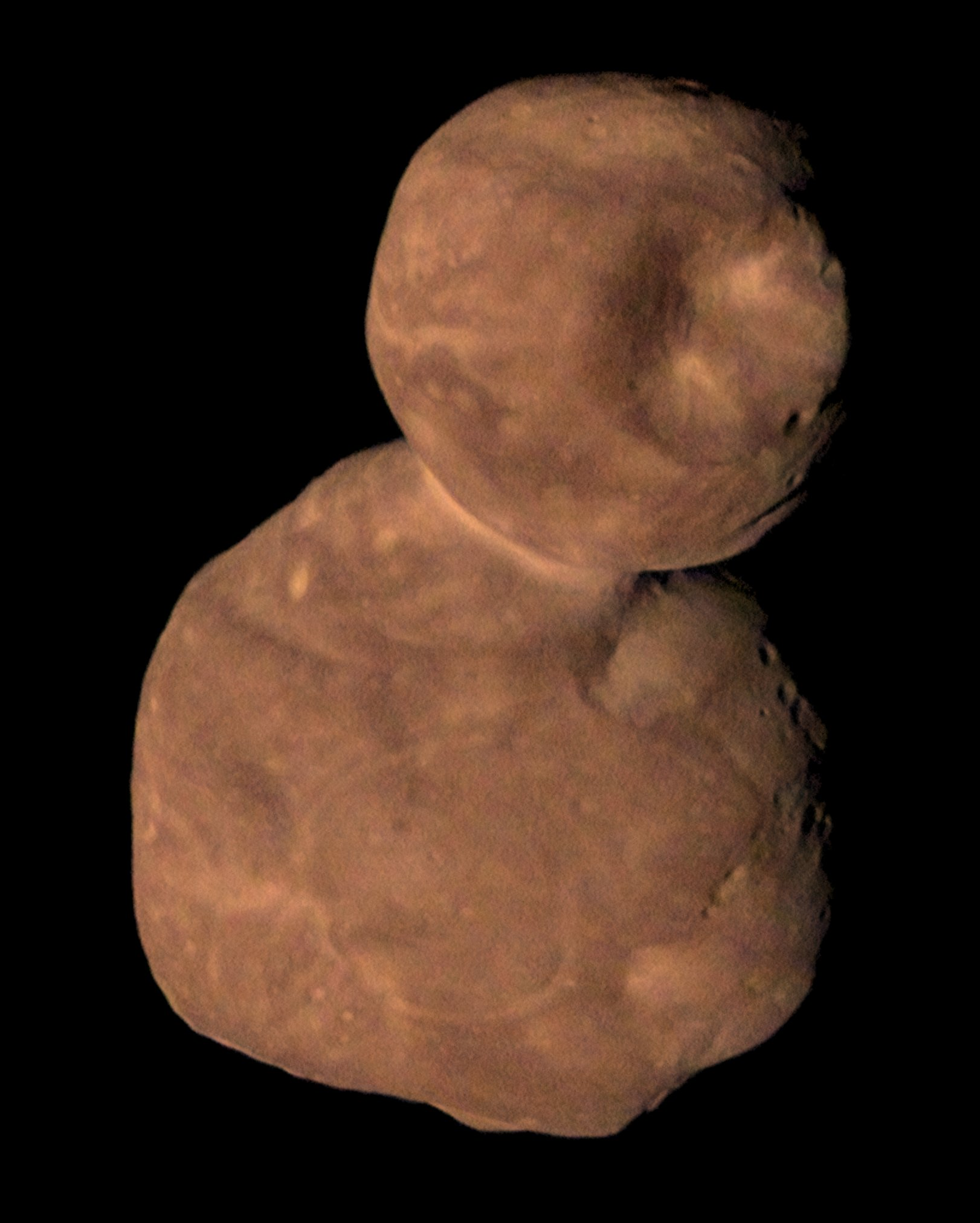
Arrokoth
(Kuiper belt object)

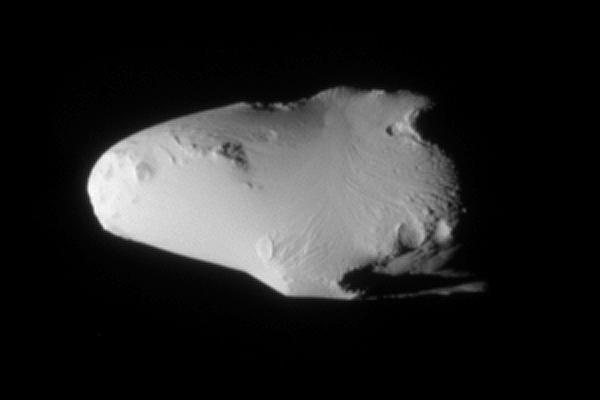
Calypso
(moon of Saturn)

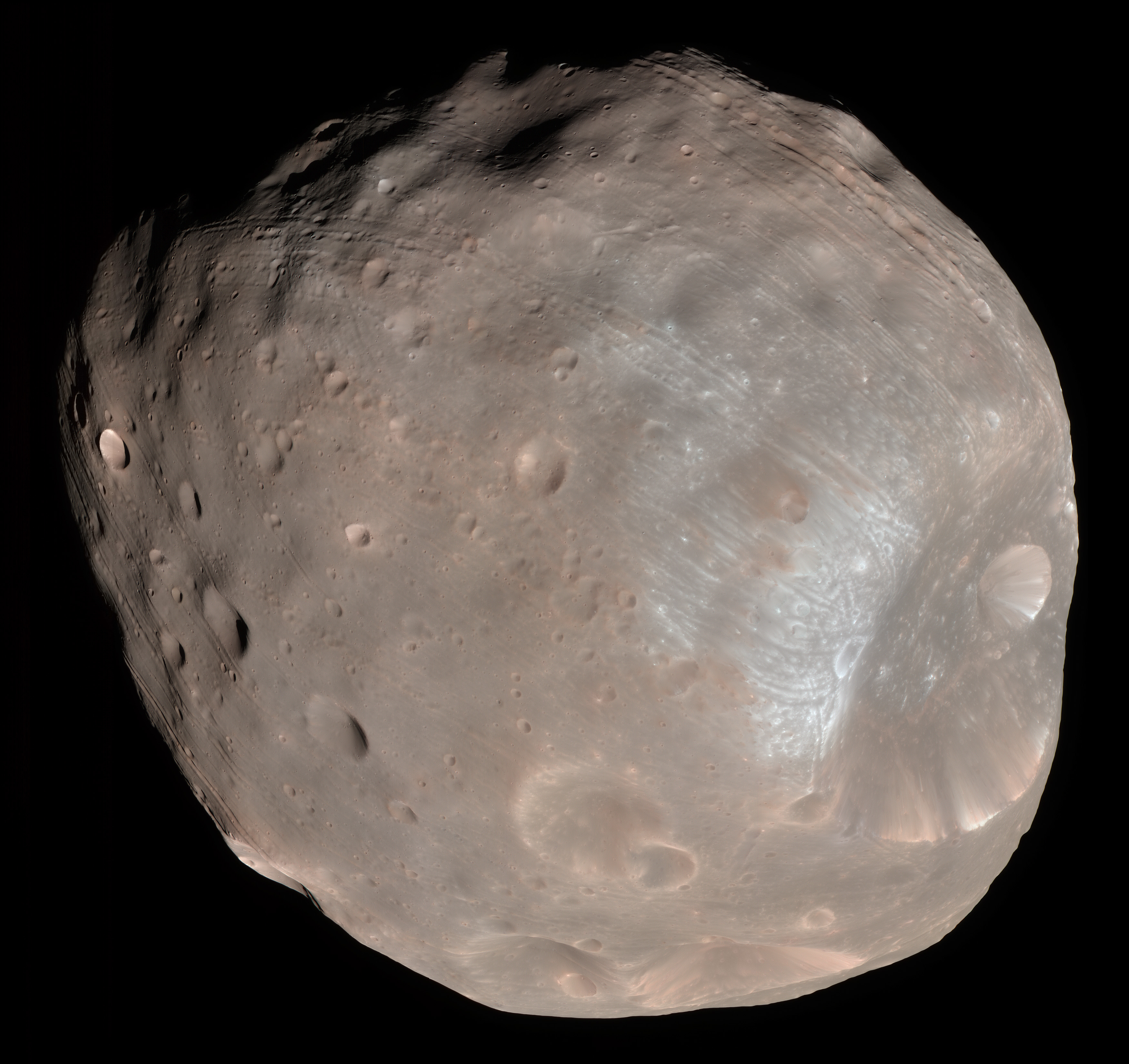
Phobos
(moon of Mars)

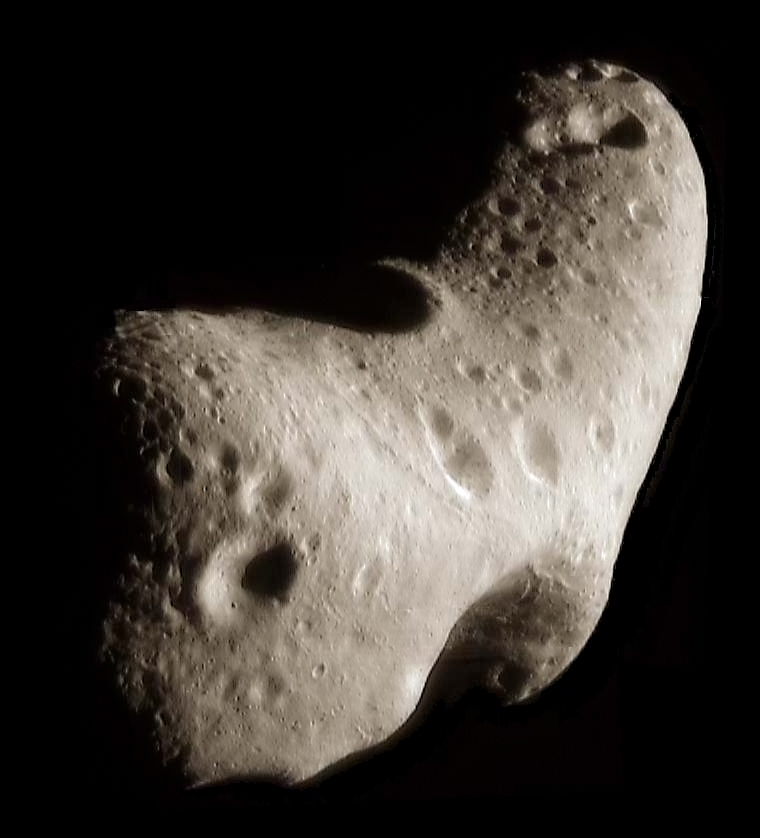
Eros
(near-Earth asteroid)

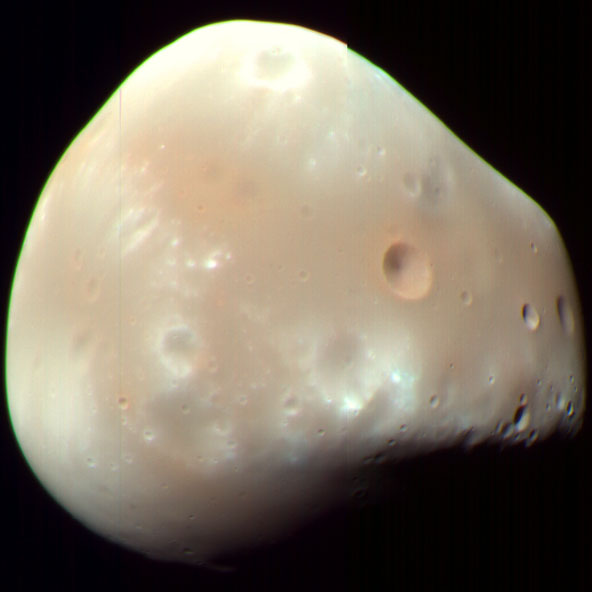
Deimos
(moon of Mars)

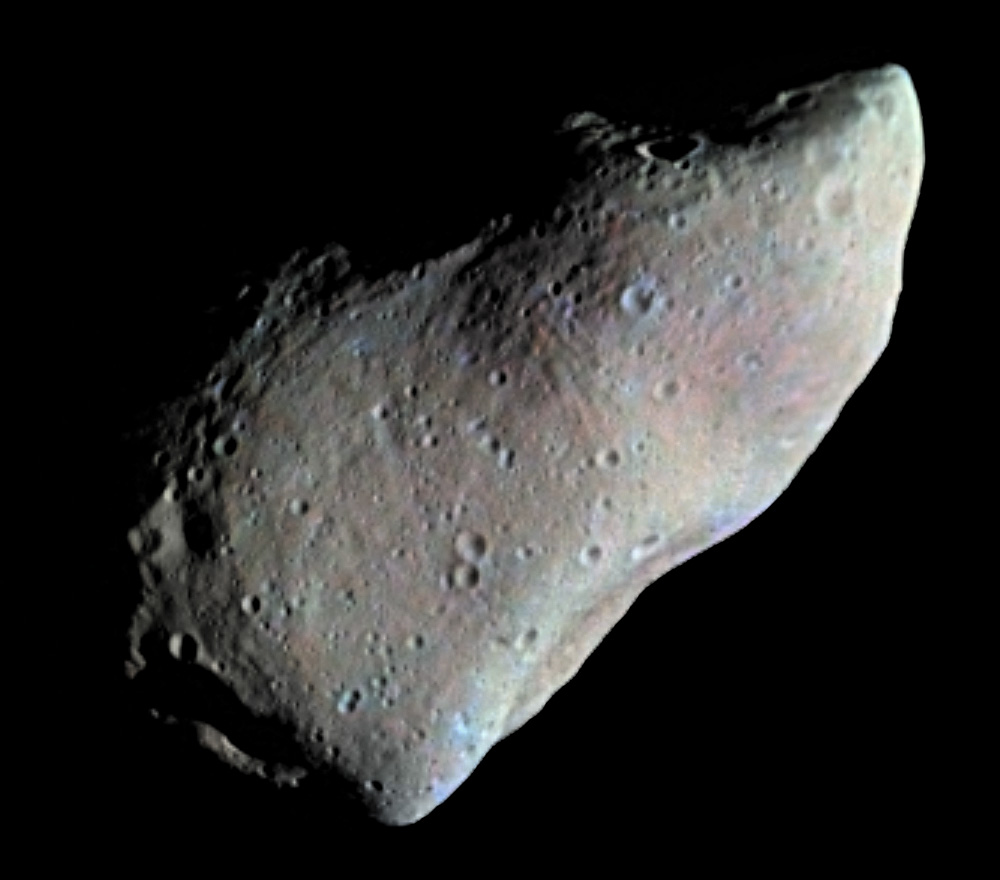
Gaspra
(belt asteroid)

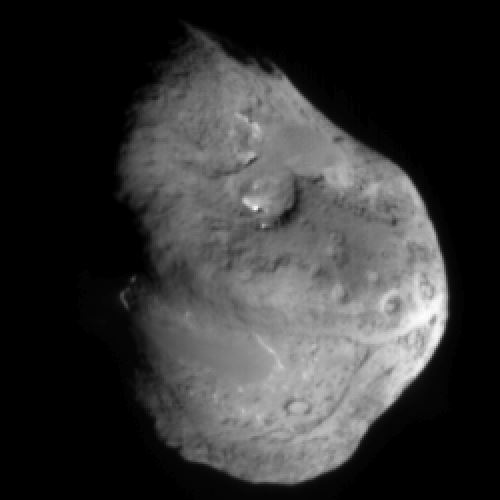
Tempel 1
(comet)

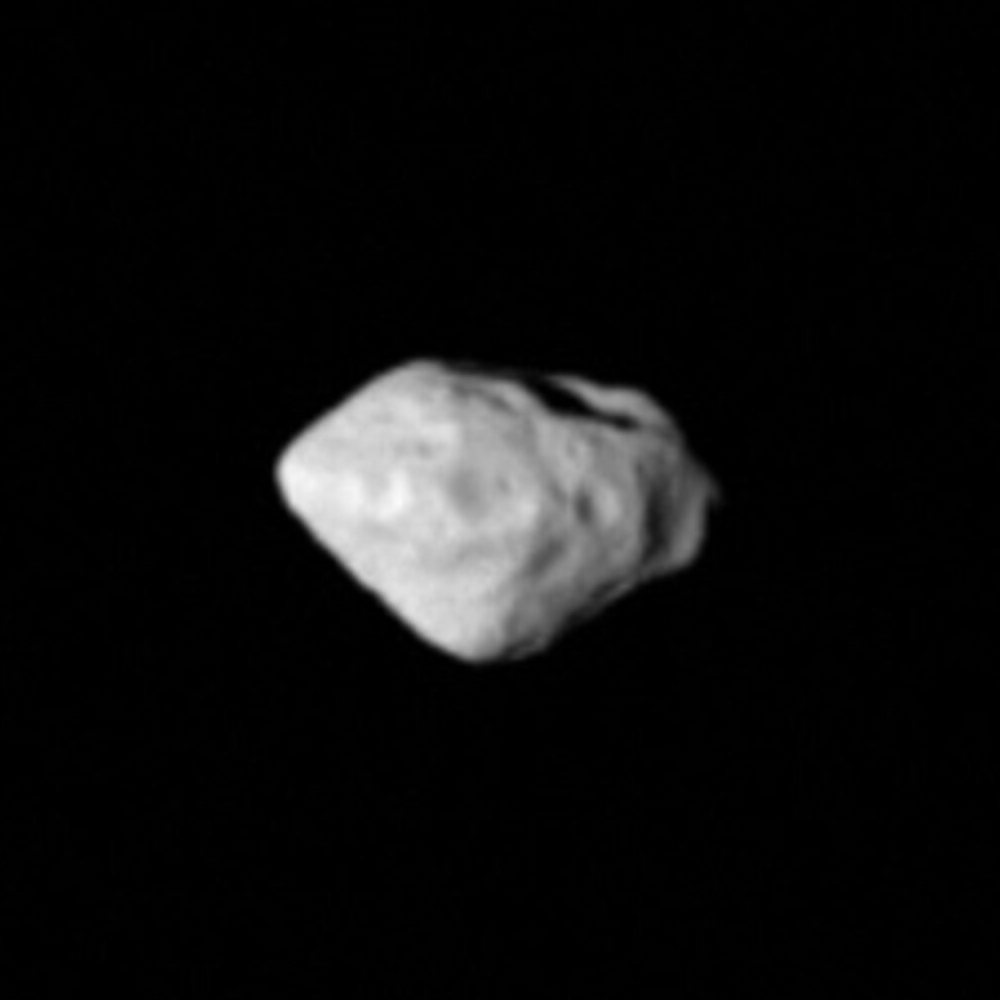
Šteins
(belt asteroid)

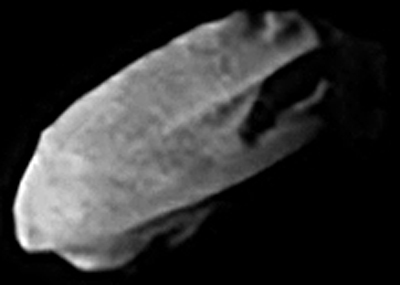
Daphnis
(moon of Saturn)

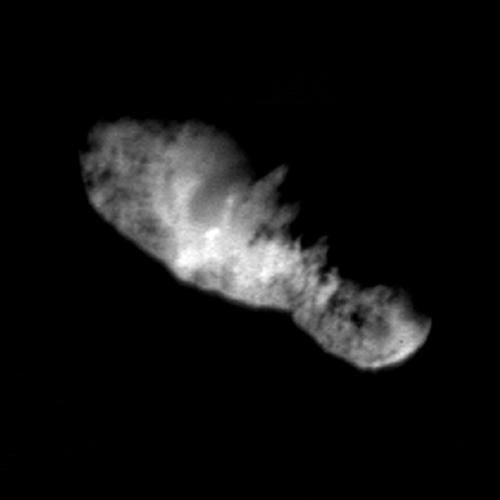
Borrelly
(comet)

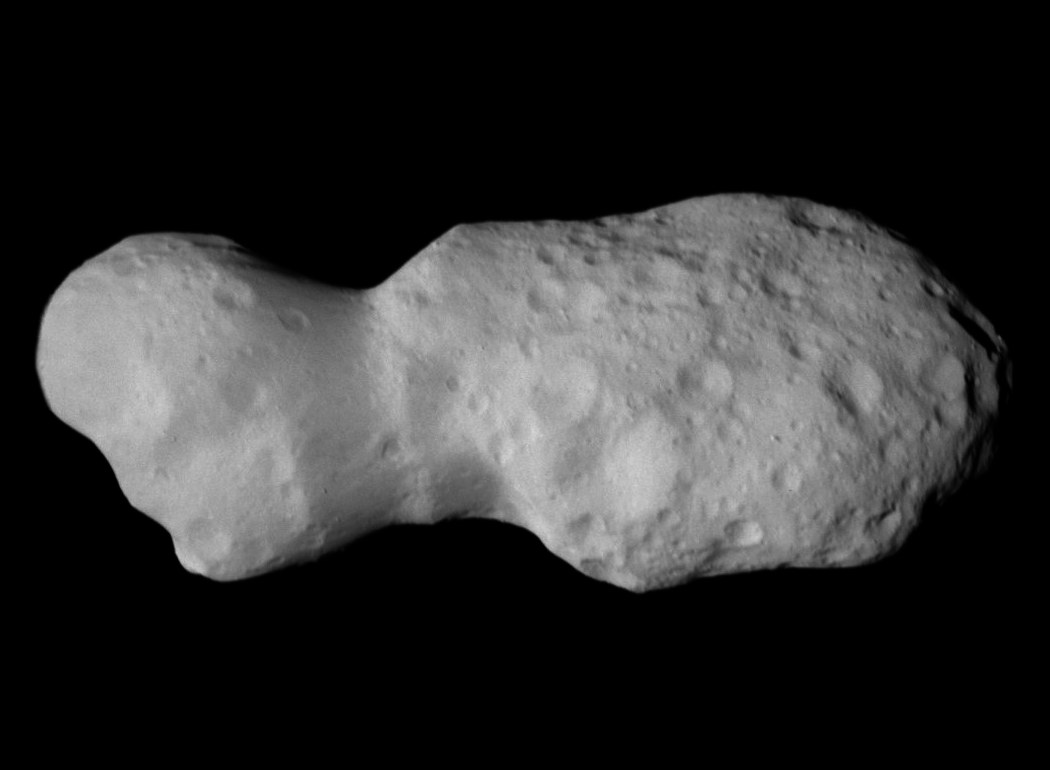
Donaldjohanson
(asteroid)

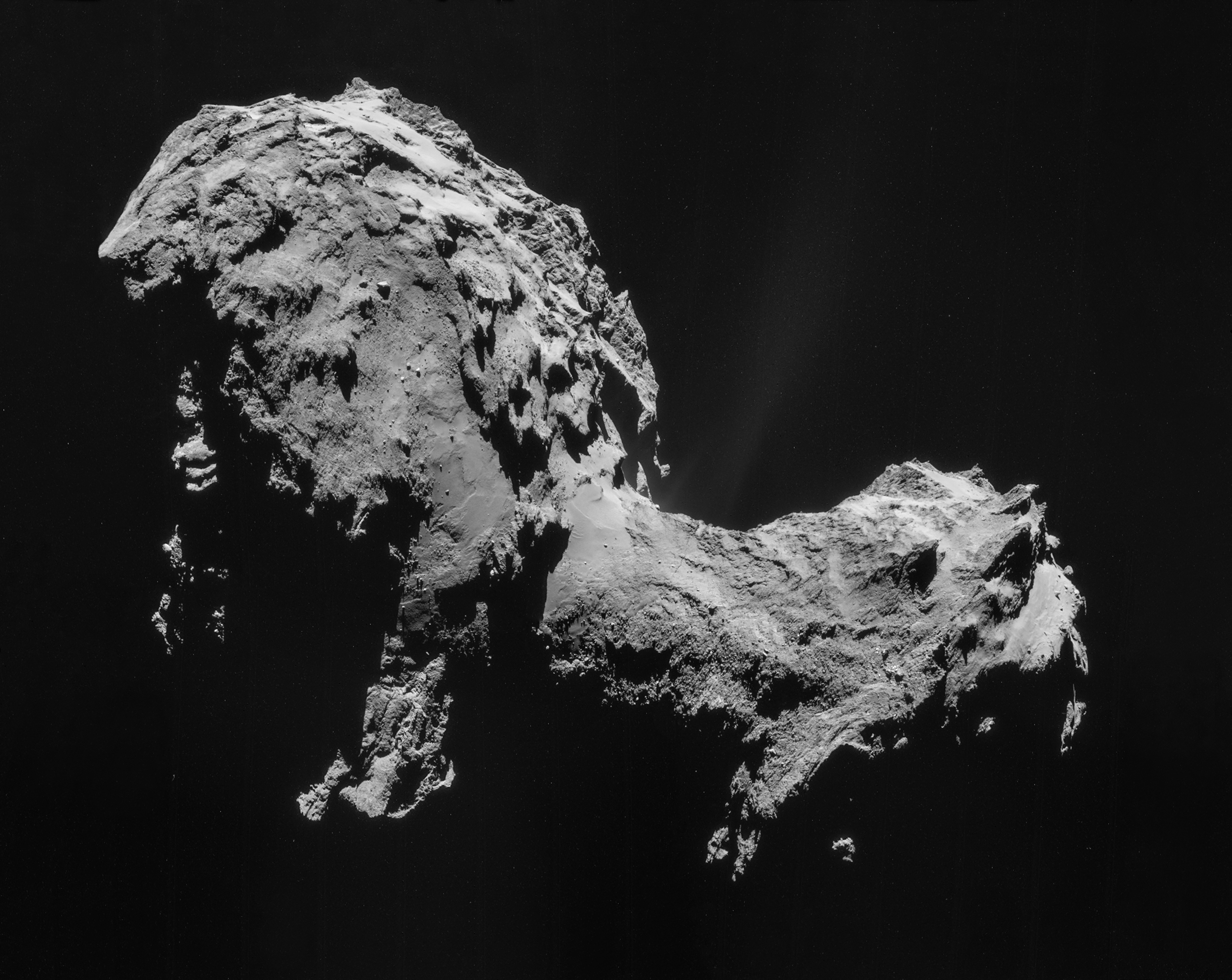
Churyumov–
Gerasimenko
(comet)

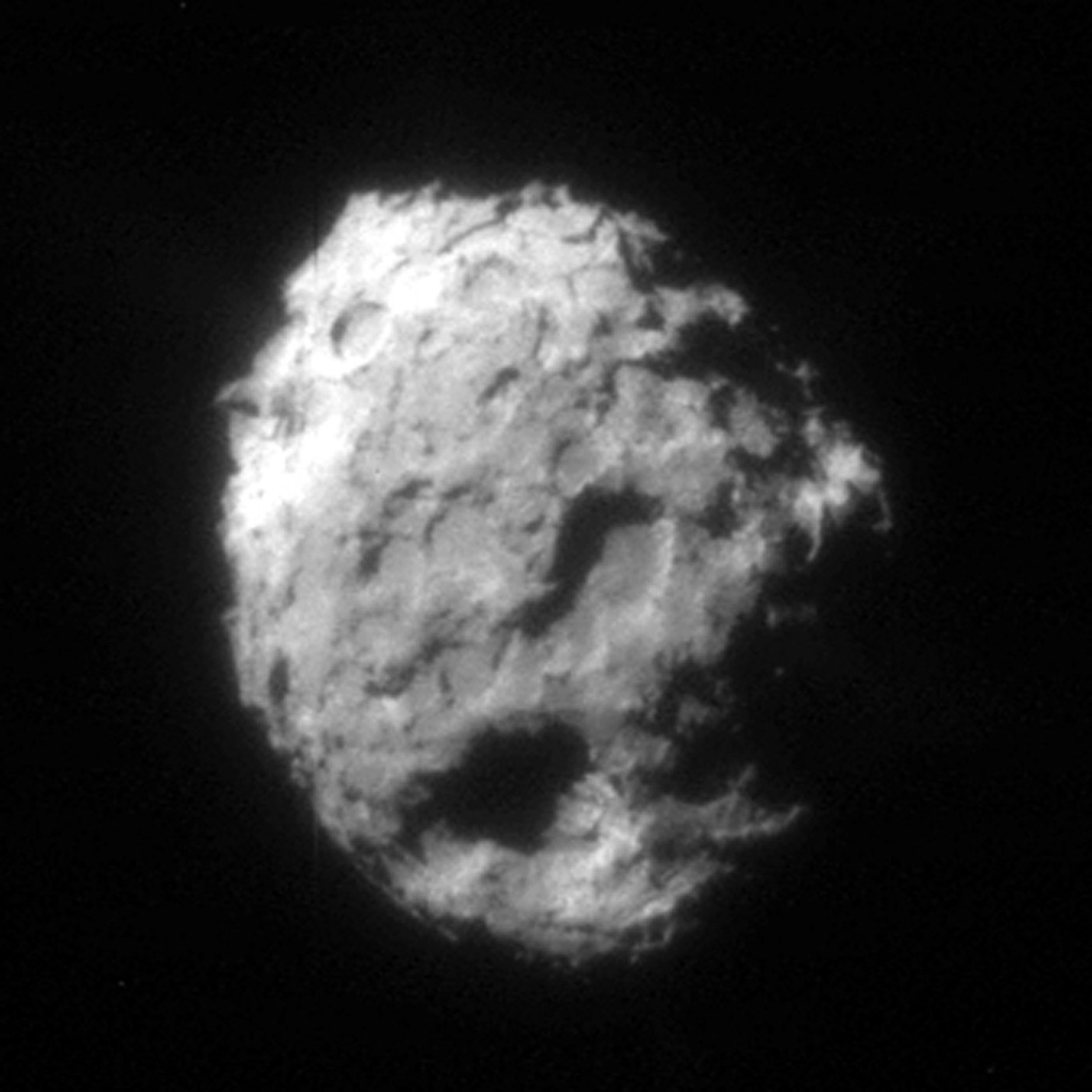
Wild 2
(comet)

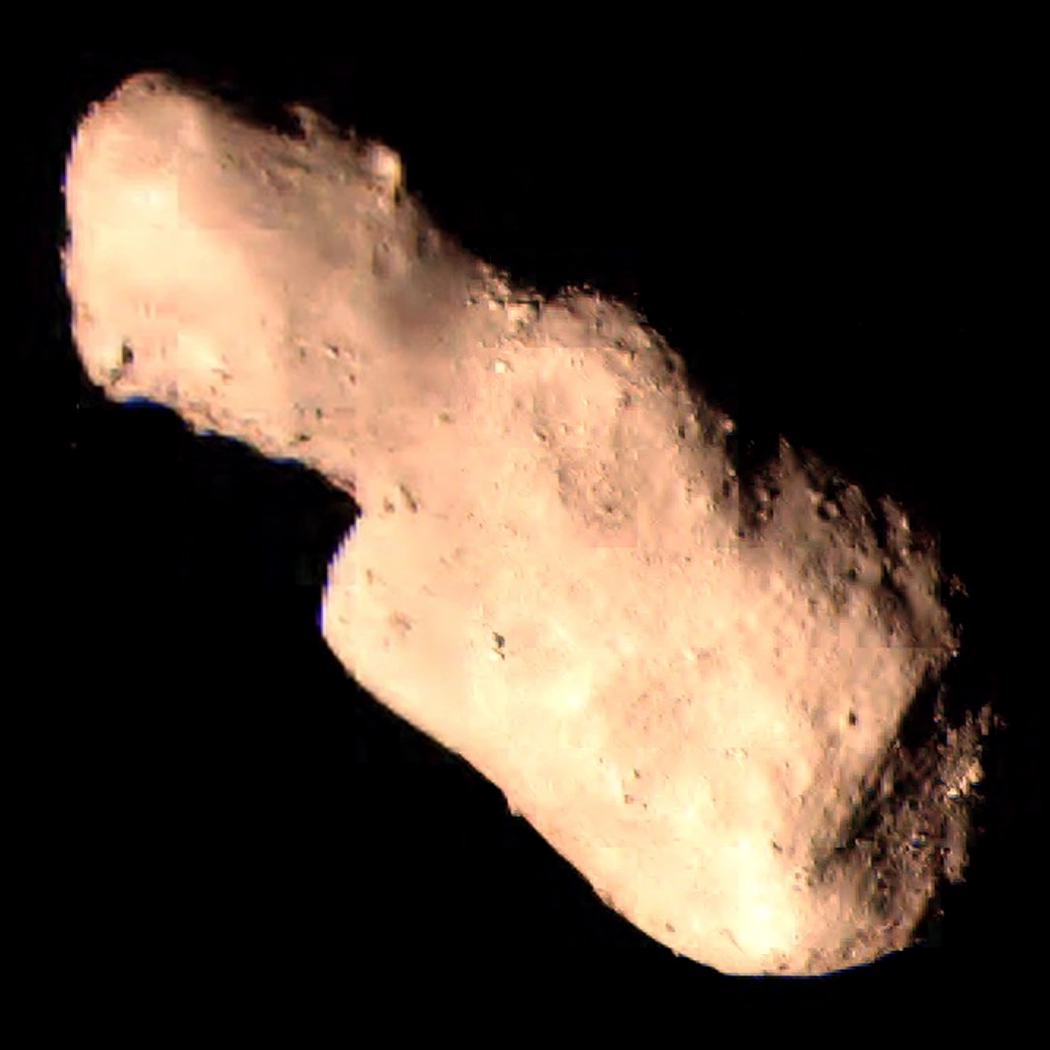
Toutatis
(near-Earth asteroid)

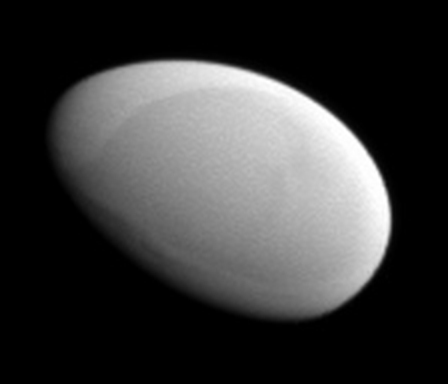
Methone
(moon of Saturn)

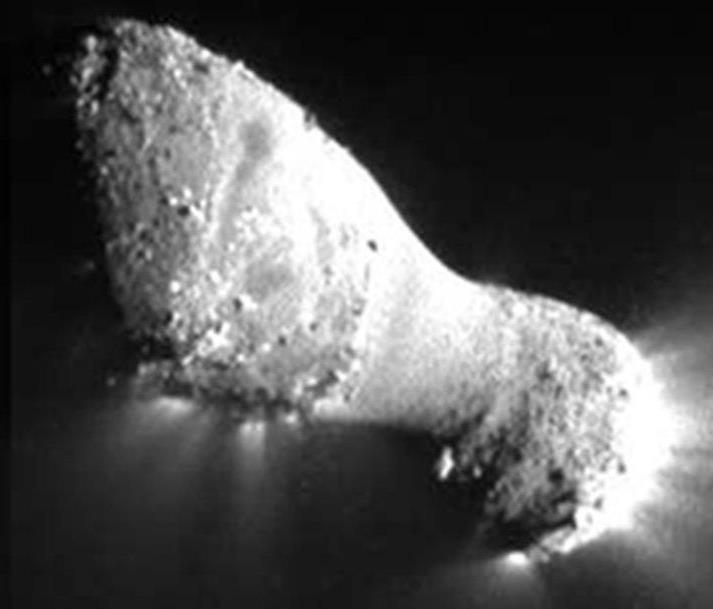
Hartley 2
(comet)

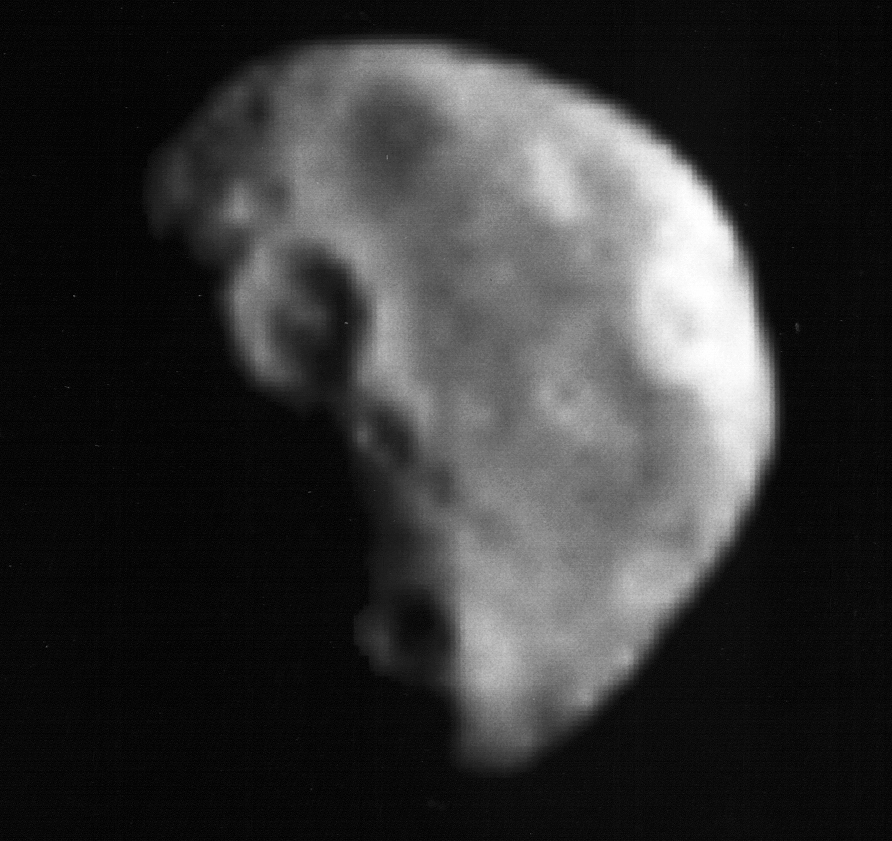
Dactyl
(moon of Ida)

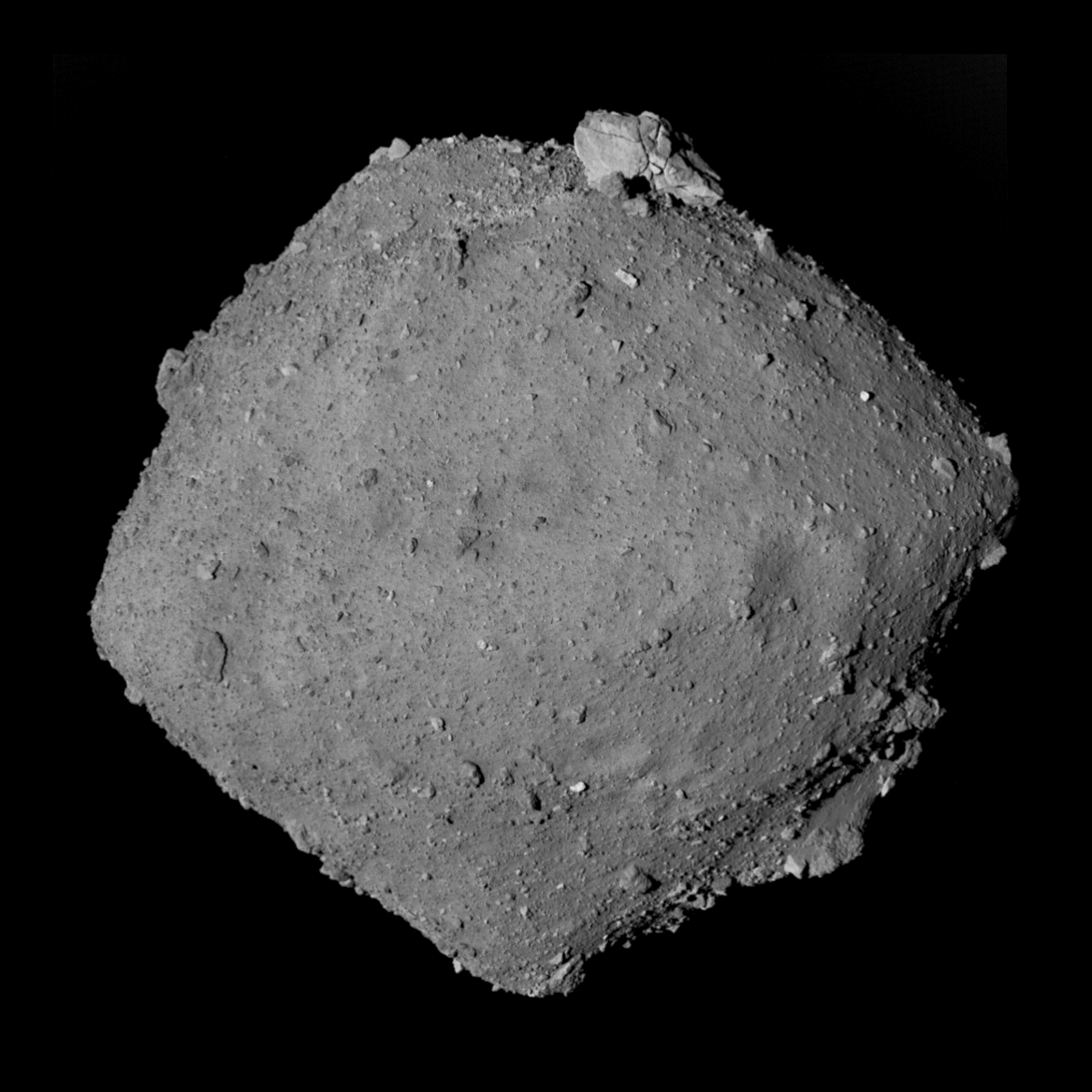
Ryugu
(near-Earth asteroid)

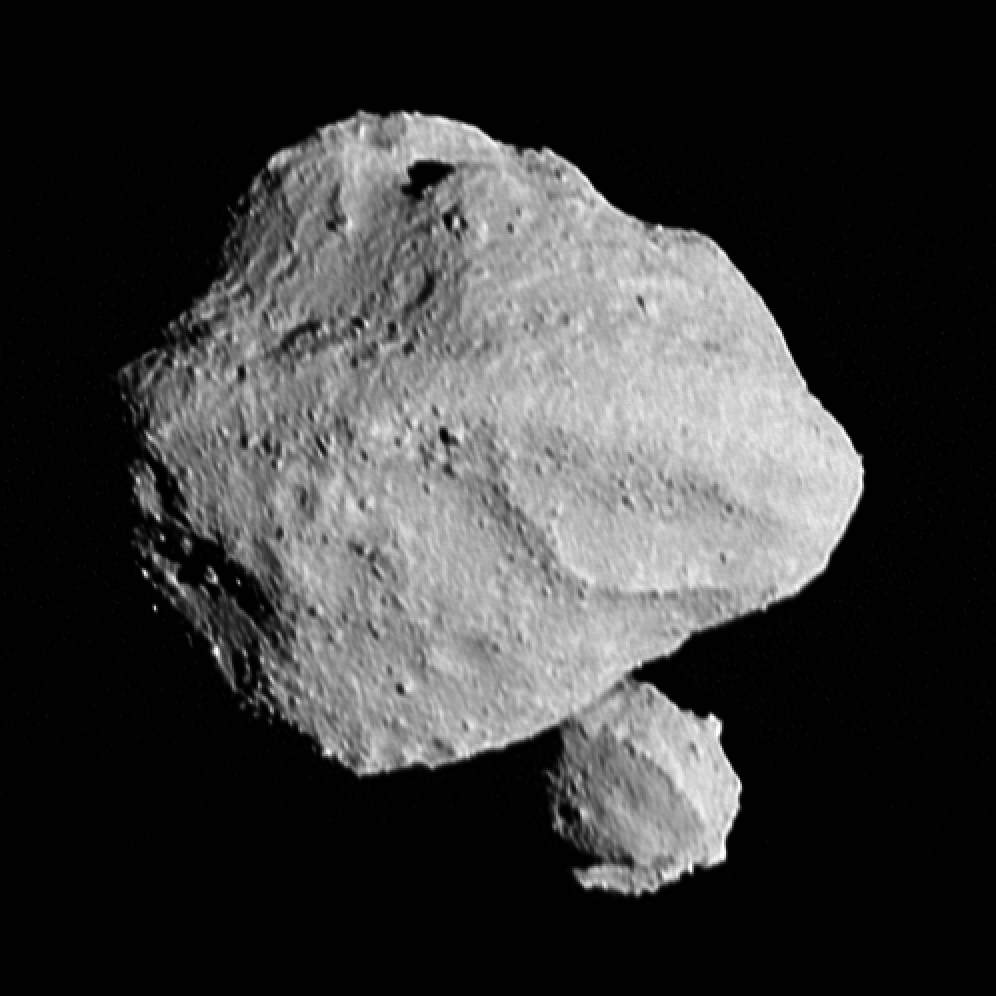
Dinkinesh
(belt asteroid)

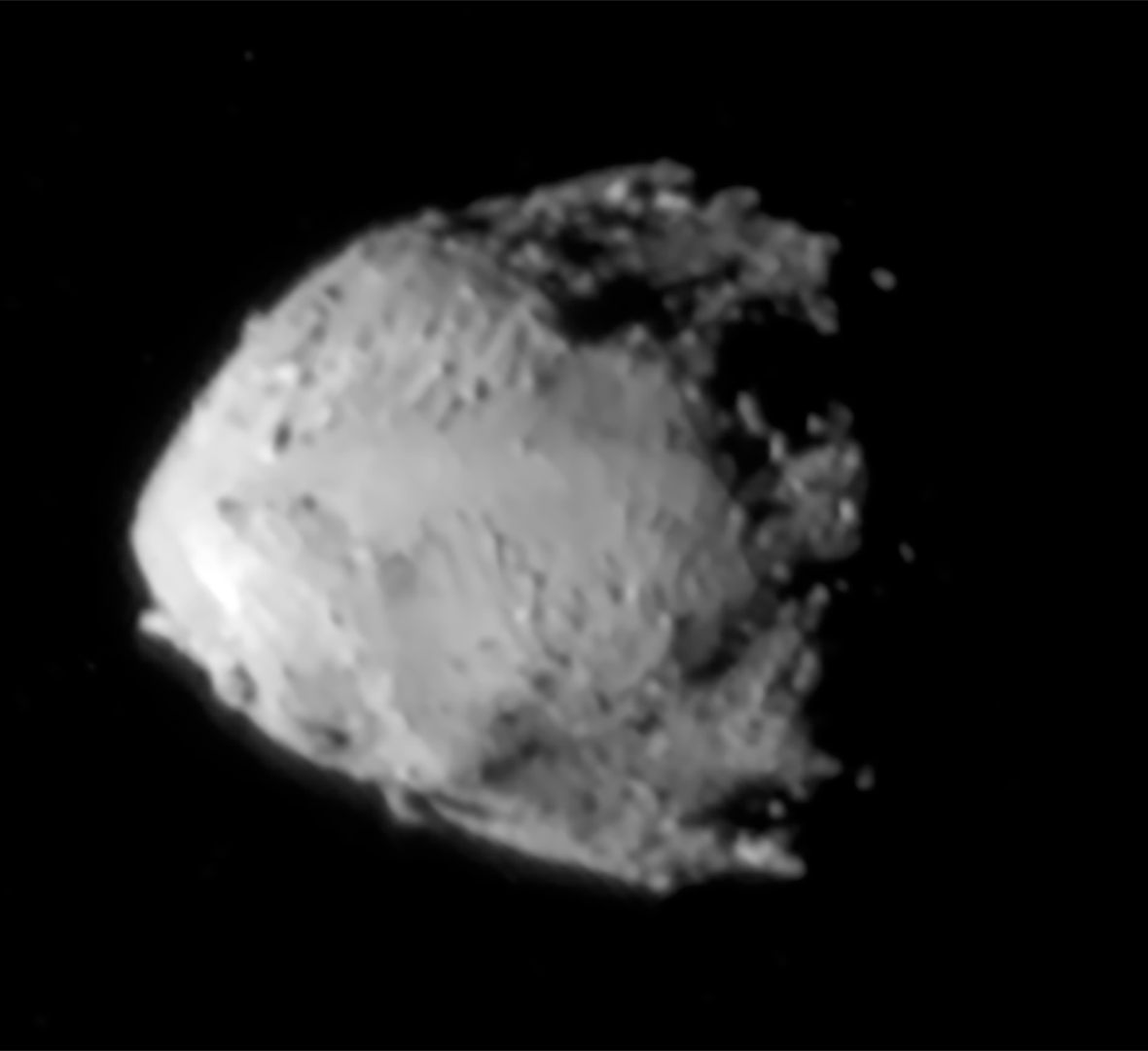
Didymos
(near-Earth asteroid)

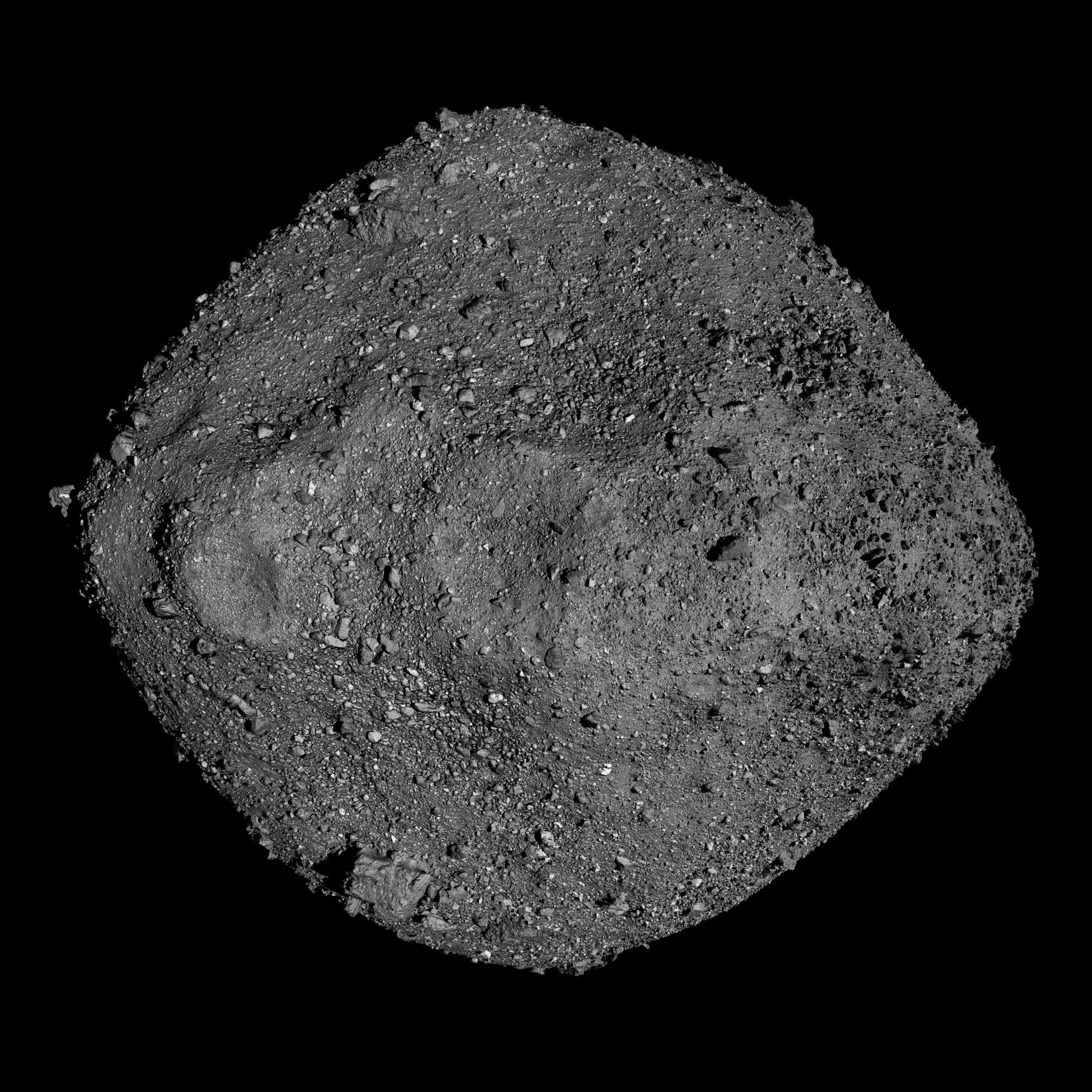
Bennu
(near-Earth asteroid)

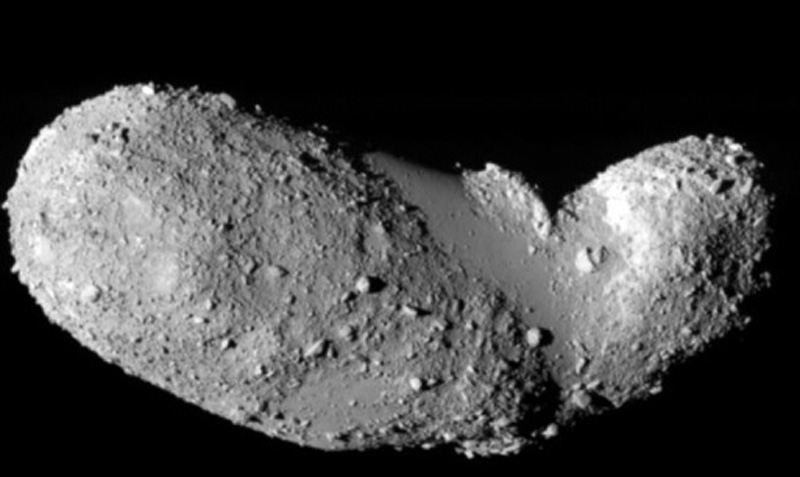
Itokawa
(near-Earth asteroid)

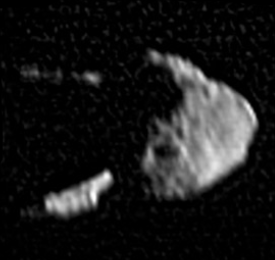
Selam
(moon of Dinkinesh)

Dimorphos
(moon of Didymos)

Objects imaged only at low resolution

Satellites
Jupiter	Saturn	Uranus	Neptune			Pluto	
Metis	Polydeuces	Puck	Nereid	Despina	Larissa	Kerberos	Styx
Selected asteroids, by number						Selected comets	
3 Juno	6 Hebe	13 Egeria	15 Eunomia	16 Psyche	29 Amphitrite	Halley's	Hyakutake
41 Daphne	324 Bamberga	511 Davida	704 Interamnia	5535 Annefrank	9969 Braille	Holmes	Giacobini–Zinner
94 Aurora	107 Camilla	423 Diotima	121 Hermione	423 Diotima	532 Herculina	419 Aurelia	52 Europa
409 Aspasia	387 Aquitania	386 Siegena	360 Carlova	22 Kalliope	283 Emma	250 Bettin	233 Asterope
165 Loreley	146 Lucina	144 Vibilia	129 Antigone	146 Lucina	144 Vibilia	135 Hertha	121 Hermione
Trans-Neptunian objects (TNO), named and/or with radius above 200 km, ordered by size
Eris	Haumea	Makemake	Gonggong	Quaoar	Sedna	Orcus	Salacia
Varda	Ixion	Varuna	Gǃkúnǁʼhòmdímà	Dziewanna	Huya		

See also the radar images at "Near-Earth object".

== See also ==
- Astronomy
  - Timeline of Solar System astronomy
  - Timeline of discovery of Solar System planets and their moons
  - List of former planets
  - List of hypothetical Solar System objects in astronomy
  - Fixed stars
  - Historical models of the Solar System
- Exploration
  - Timeline of spaceflight
  - Timeline of space exploration
  - Timeline of Solar System exploration
  - Timeline of first images of Earth from space
  - List of Solar System probes

== Bibliography ==
- Masip, Joel Gabas (2016). El sistema solar, un rincón particular de la Vía Láctea [The Solar System, a special place of the Milky Way] (in Spanish). Spain: RBA. ISBN 978-84-473-8562-1.
