= Moons of Mars =

Natural satellites of the planet Mars

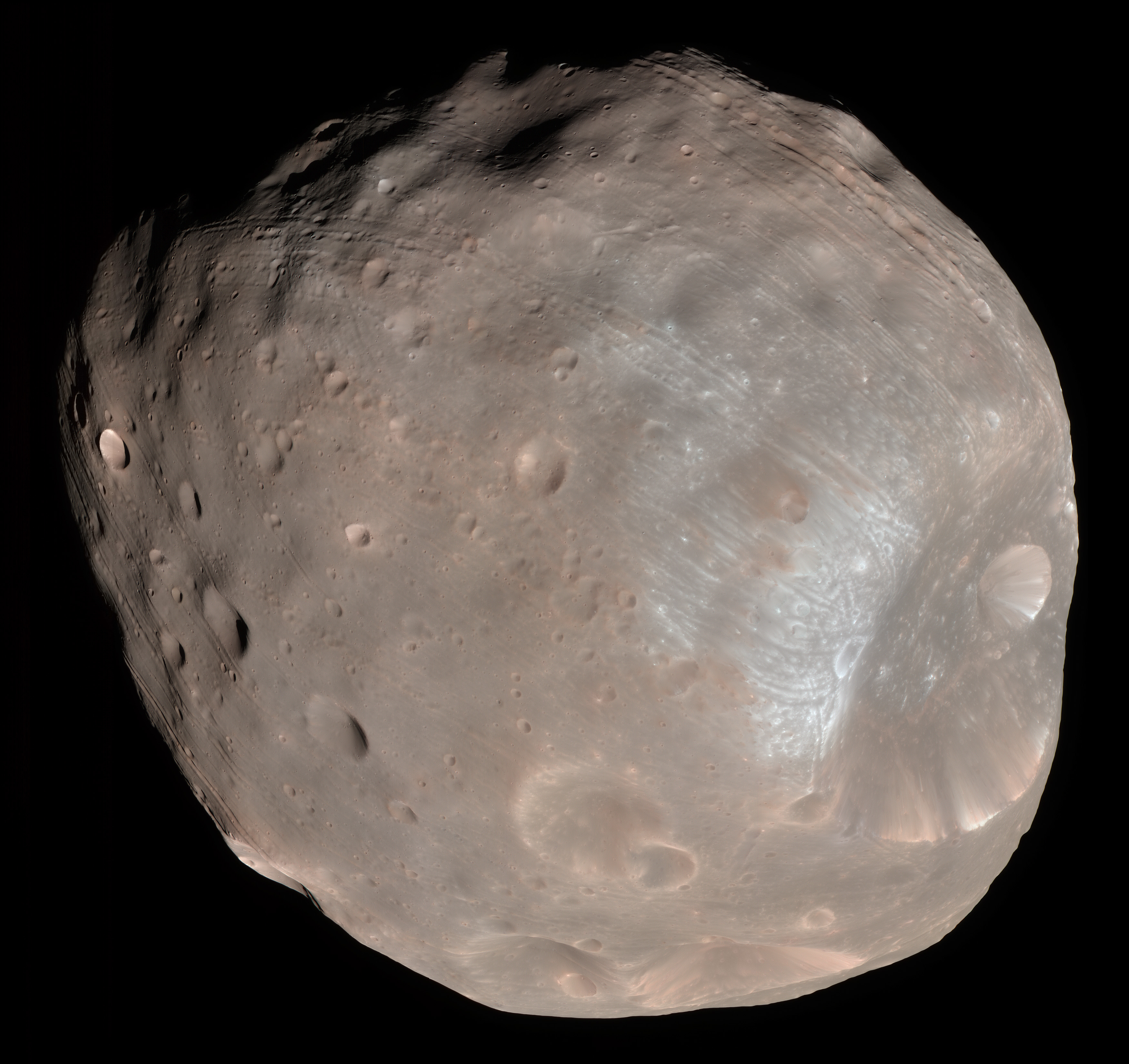
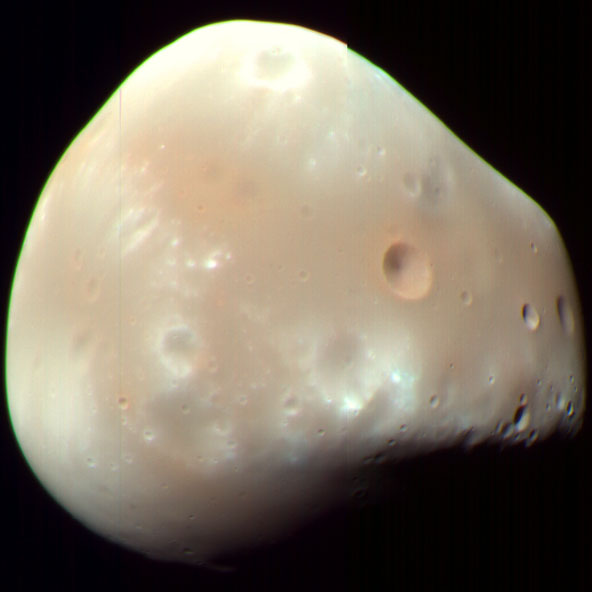
Enhanced color images of Phobos (left) and Deimos (right), taken by the Mars Reconnaissance Orbiter

The two moons of Mars are Phobos and Deimos. They are irregular in shape. Both were discovered by American astronomer Asaph Hall in August 1877 and are named after the Greek mythological twin characters Phobos (fear and panic) and Deimos (terror and dread) who accompanied their father Ares (Mars in Roman mythology, hence the name of the planet) into battle.

Phobos passing in front of Deimos, as viewed in real time by the Curiosity rover on the surface of Mars.

Compared to the Earth's Moon, the moons Phobos and Deimos are very small. Phobos has a diameter of 22.2 km (13.8 mi) and a mass of 1.08×10^{16} kg, while Deimos measures 12.6 km (7.8 mi) across, with a mass of 1.5×10^{15} kg. Phobos orbits closer to Mars, with a semi-major axis of 9,377 km (5,827 mi) and an orbital period of 7.66 hours; while Deimos orbits farther with a semi-major axis of 23,460 km (14,580 mi) and an orbital period of 30.35 hours.

Two major hypotheses have emerged as to the origin of the moons: The first suggests that they originated from Mars itself, perhaps from a giant impact event suggested to have created the Martian dichotomy and the Borealis Basin. The second suggests that they are captured asteroids. Both hypotheses are compatible with current data, though upcoming sample return missions may be able to distinguish which hypothesis is correct.

== History ==
=== Early speculation ===
Speculation about the existence of the moons of Mars had begun when the moons of Jupiter were discovered. When Galileo Galilei (1564–1642), as a hidden report about his having observed two bumps on the sides of Saturn, later discovered to be its rings, used the anagram smaismrmilmepoetaleumibunenugttauiras for Altissimum planetam tergeminum observavi ("I have observed the most distant planet to have a triple form"), Johannes Kepler (1571–1630) had misinterpreted it to mean Salve umbistineum geminatum Martia proles (Hello, furious twins, sons of Mars).

Perhaps inspired by Kepler (and quoting Kepler's third law of planetary motion), Jonathan Swift's satire Gulliver's Travels (1726) refers to two moons in Part 3, Chapter 3 (the "Voyage to Laputa"), in which Laputa's astronomers are described as having discovered two satellites of Mars orbiting at distances of 3 and 5 Martian diameters with periods of 10 and 21.5 hours. Phobos and Deimos, both found in 1877, more than a century after Swift's novel, have actual orbital distances of 1.4 and 3.5 Martian diameters, and their respective orbital periods are 7.66 and 30.35 hours.

In the 20th century, V. G. Perminov, a spacecraft designer of early Soviet Mars and Venus spacecraft, speculated that Swift found and deciphered records that Martians left on Earth. The view of most astronomers is that Swift was simply employing a common argument of the time, that as the inner planets Venus and Mercury had no satellites, Earth had one and Jupiter had four, known at the time, that Mars by analogy must have two. As they had not yet been discovered, it was reasoned that they must be small and close to Mars. This would lead Swift to make a roughly accurate estimate of their orbital distances and revolution periods. Swift could have been helped in his calculations by his friend, the mathematician John Arbuthnot.

Voltaire's 1752 short story "Micromégas", about an alien visitor to Earth, also refers to two moons of Mars. Voltaire was presumably influenced by Swift. In recognition of these literary references, two craters on Deimos are named Swift and Voltaire, while on Phobos there is one named regio, Laputa Regio, and one named planitia, Lagado Planitia, both of which are named after places in Gulliver's Travels (the fictional Laputa, a flying island, and Lagado, imaginary capital of the fictional nation Balnibarbi). Many of the craters on Phobos are also named after characters in Gulliver's Travels.

=== Discovery ===
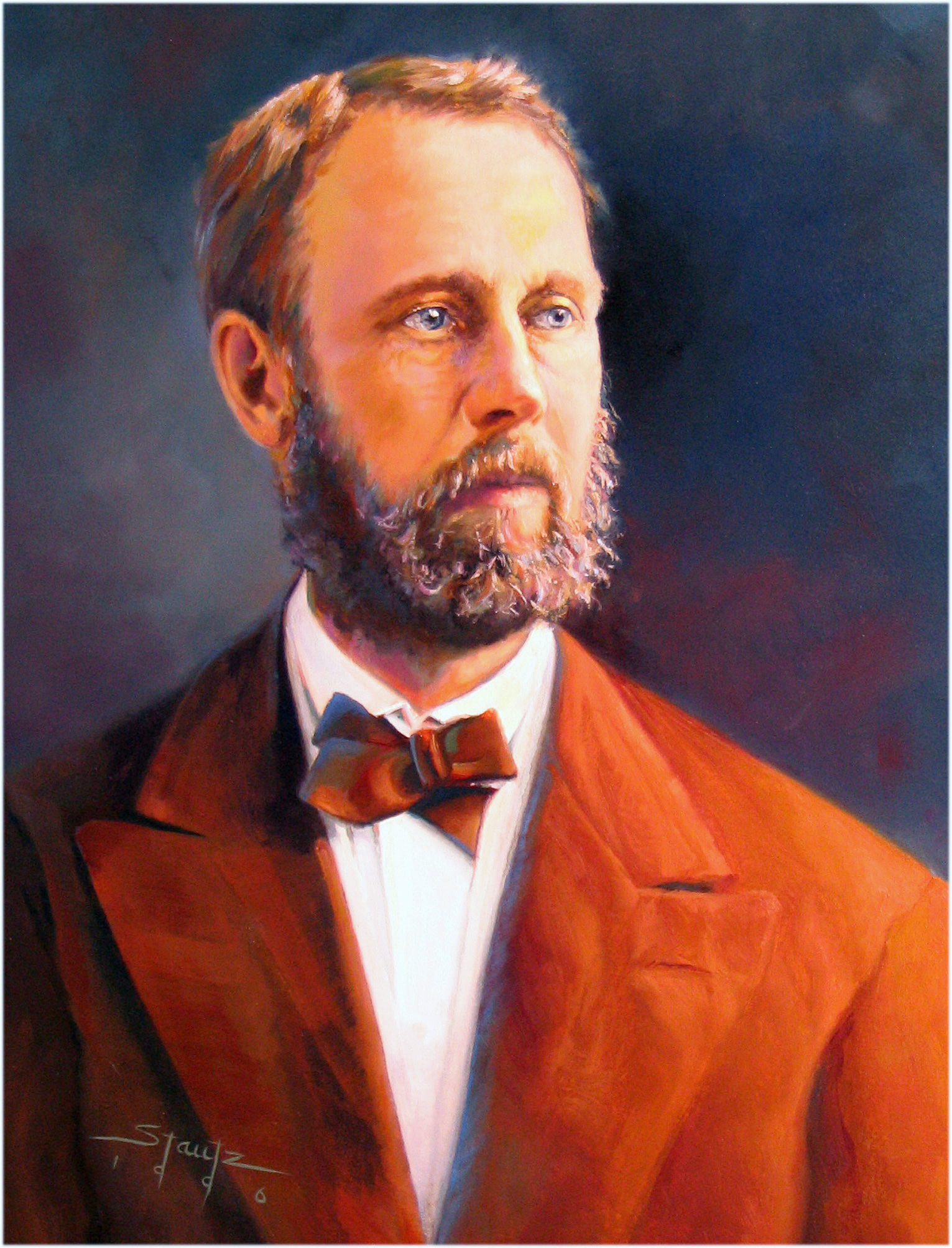
Asaph Hall III, discoverer of Phobos and Deimos

Asaph Hall discovered Deimos on 12 August 1877 at about 07:48 UTC and Phobos on 18 August 1877, at the US Naval Observatory (the Old Naval Observatory in Foggy Bottom) in Washington, D.C., at about 09:14 GMT. Contemporary sources, using the pre-1925 astronomical convention that began the day at noon, give the time of discovery as 11 August 14:40 and 17 August 16:06 Washington mean time respectively. At the time, he was deliberately searching for Martian moons. Hall had previously seen what appeared to be a Martian moon on 10 August, but due to bad weather, he could not definitively identify them until later.

Hall recorded his discovery of Phobos in his notebook as follows:

"I repeated the examination in the early part of the night of 11th [August 1877], and again found nothing, but trying again some hours later I found a faint object on the following side and a little north of the planet. I had barely time to secure an observation of its position when fog from the River stopped the work. This was at half-past two o'clock on the night of the 11th. Cloudy weather intervened for several days.
"On 15 August the weather looking more promising, I slept at the Observatory. The sky cleared off with a thunderstorm at 11 o'clock and the search was resumed. The atmosphere however was in a very bad condition and Mars was so blazing and unsteady that nothing could be seen of the object, which we now know was at that time so near the planet as to be invisible.
"On 16 August the object was found again on the following side of the planet, and the observations of that night showed that it was moving with the planet and if a satellite, was near one of its elongations. Until this time I had said nothing to anyone at the Observatory of my search for a satellite of Mars, but on leaving the observatory after these observations of the 16th, at about three o'clock in the morning, I told my assistant, George Anderson, to whom I had shown the object, that I thought I had discovered a satellite of Mars. I told him also to keep quiet as I did not wish anything said until the matter was beyond doubt. He said nothing, but the thing was too good to keep and I let it out myself. On 17 August between one and two o'clock, while I was reducing my observations, Professor Newcomb came into my room to eat his lunch and I showed him my measures of the faint object near Mars which proved that it was moving with the planet.
"On 17 August while waiting and watching for the outer moon, the inner one was discovered. The observations of the 17th and 18th put beyond doubt the character of these objects and the discovery was publicly announced by Admiral Rodgers."

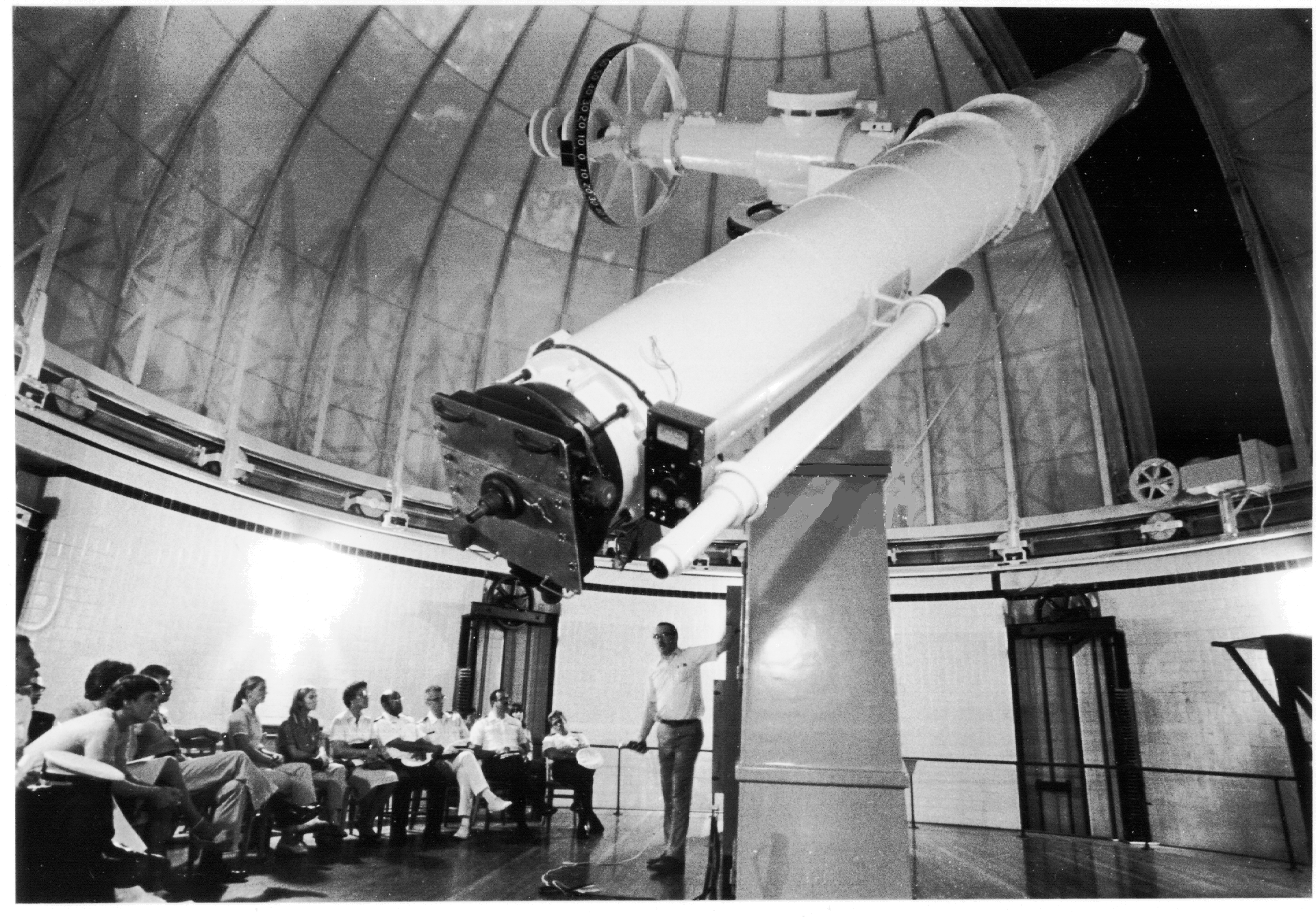
The telescope used by Asaph Hall in the discovery of the Martian moons

The telescope used for the discovery was the 26-inch (66 cm) refractor (telescope with a lens) then located at Foggy Bottom. In 1893 the lens was remounted and put in a new dome, where it remains into the 21st century.

The names, originally spelled Phobus and Deimus, respectively, were suggested by Henry Madan (1838–1901), Science Master of Eton, from Book XV of the Iliad, where Ares summons Fear and Fright. The granddaughter of Henry Madan's brother Falconer Madan was Venetia Burney, who first suggested the name of Pluto.

=== Mars moon hoax ===
In 1959, Walter Scott Houston perpetrated a celebrated April Fool's hoax in the April edition of the Great Plains Observer, claiming that "Dr. Arthur Hayall of the University of the Sierras reports that the moons of Mars are actually artificial satellites". Both Dr. Hayall and the University of the Sierras were fictitious. The hoax gained worldwide attention when Houston's claim was repeated in earnest by a Soviet scientist, Iosif Shklovsky, who, based on a later-disproven density estimate, suggested Phobos was a hollow metal shell.

=== Recent surveys ===
Searches have been conducted for additional satellites. In 2003, Scott S. Sheppard and David C. Jewitt surveyed nearly the entire Hill sphere of Mars for irregular satellites. However, scattered light from Mars prevented them from searching the inner few arcminutes where the satellites Phobos and Deimos reside. No new satellites were found to an apparent limiting red magnitude of 23.5, which corresponds to radii of about 0.09 km using an albedo of 0.07.

== Characteristics ==
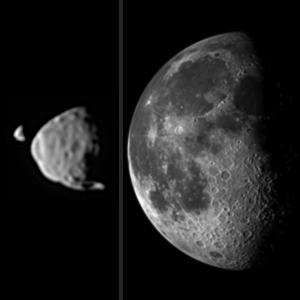
The apparent sizes of the moons of Mars, Deimos and Phobos, and the Moon as viewed from the surface of their respective planets. Mars's moons as imaged by the Curiosity rover, 1 August 2013

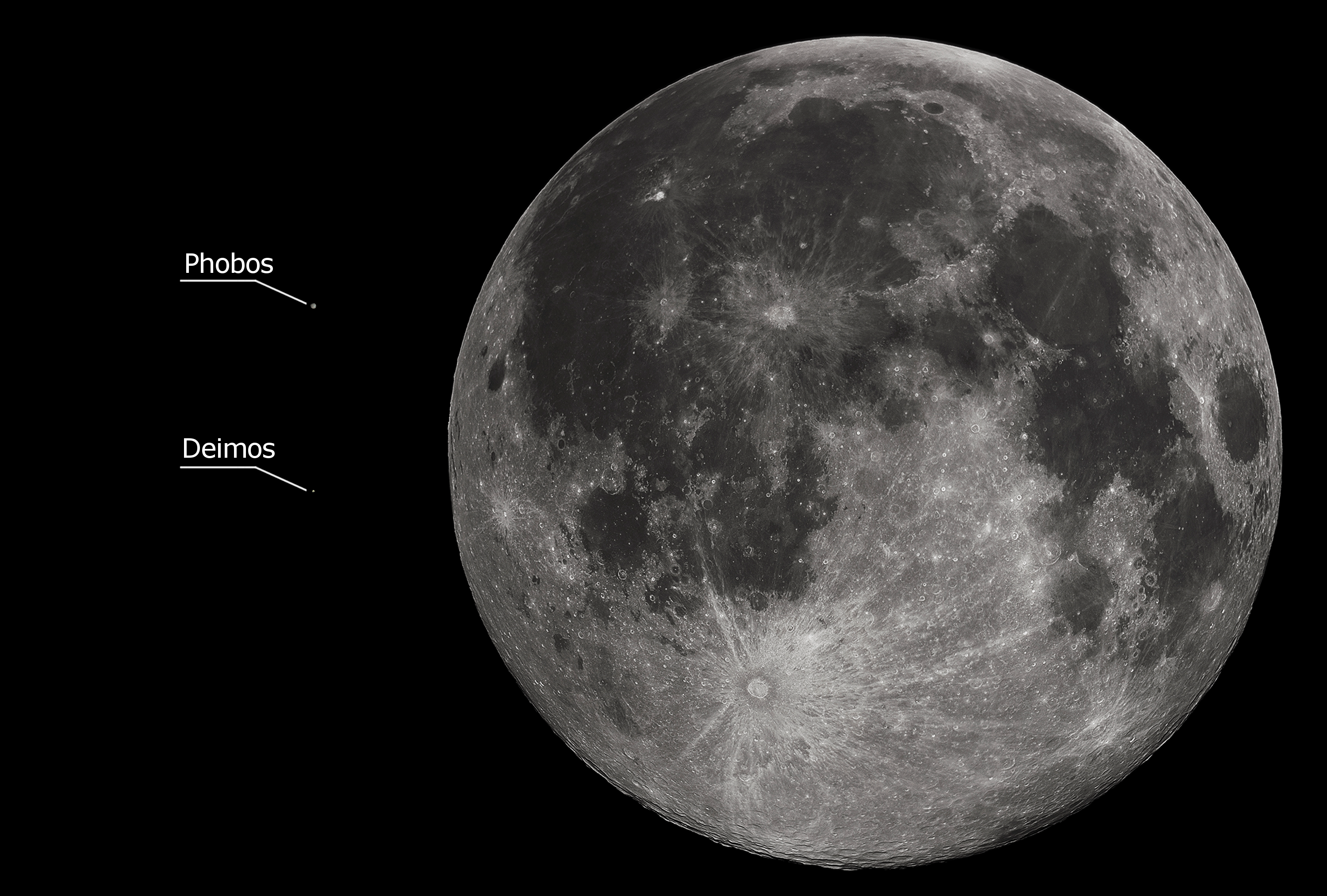
Size comparison between Phobos, Deimos and the Moon (right)

If viewed from Mars's surface near its equator, a full Phobos would look about one-third as big as a full moon on Earth. It has an angular diameter of between 8' (rising) and 12' (overhead). Due to its close orbit, it would look smaller when the observer is further away from the Martian equator until it completely sinks below the horizon as the observer travels closer to the poles; thus Phobos is not visible from Mars's polar ice caps.

Deimos would look more like a bright star or planet (only slightly bigger than how Venus looks from Earth) for an observer on Mars. It has an angular diameter of about 2'. The Sun's angular diameter as seen from Mars, by contrast, is about 21'. Thus there are no total solar eclipses on Mars as the moons are far too small to completely cover the Sun. On the other hand, total lunar eclipses of Phobos happen almost every night.

The motions of Phobos and Deimos would appear very different from that of Earth's Moon. Speedy Phobos rises in the west, sets in the east, and rises again in just eleven hours, while Deimos, being only just outside synchronous orbit, rises as expected in the east but very slowly. Despite its 30-hour orbit, it takes 2.7 days to set in the west as it slowly falls behind the rotation of Mars.

Both moons are tidally locked, always presenting the same face towards Mars. Since Phobos orbits Mars faster than the planet itself rotates, tidal forces are slowly but steadily decreasing its orbital radius. At some point in the future, when it falls within the Roche limit, Phobos will be broken up by these tidal forces and either crash into Mars or form a ring. Several strings of craters on the Martian surface, inclined further from the equator the older they are, suggest that there may have been other small moons that suffered the fate expected of Phobos, and that the Martian crust as a whole shifted between these events. Deimos, on the other hand, is far enough away that its orbit is being slowly boosted instead, akin to Earth's Moon.

=== Orbital details ===
| Label (Note: Label refers to the Roman numeral attributed to each moon in order of their discovery.) | Name and pronunciation | | Image | Diameter (km) | Surface area (km^{2}) | Mass (kg) | Semi-major axis (km) | Orbital period (h) | Average moonrise period (h, d) | Eccentricity | Inclination (°) (Note: Orbital inclinations are given to Mars's equator.) |
|---|---|---|---|---|---|---|---|---|---|---|---|
| I | Phobos | /ˈfoʊbəs/ FOH-bəs | | 22.2 km (13.8 mi) (27 × 21.6 × 18.8 km) | 1,548 km^{2} | 1.07×10^{16} | 9,377 km (5,827 mi) | 7.66 | 11.12 h (0.463 d) | 0.0151 | 1.093 |
| II | Deimos | /ˈdaɪməs/ DY-məss | | 12.6 km (7.8 mi) (10 × 12 × 16 km) | 483 km^{2} | 1.5×10^{15} | 23,460 km (14,580 mi) | 30.31 | 131 h (5.44 d) | 0.00033 | 0.93 |
The relative sizes of and distance between Mars, Phobos, and Deimos, to scale (Load the image in full size to see both moons of Mars.)

== Origin ==
An animation illustrating the asteroid-belt origin for the moons

The origin of the Martian moons is still controversial. Phobos and Deimos both have much in common with carbonaceous C-type asteroids, with spectra, albedo, and density very similar to those of C- or D-type asteroids. Based on their similarity, one hypothesis is that both moons may be captured main-belt asteroids. Both moons have very circular orbits which lie almost exactly in Mars's equatorial plane, and hence a capture origin requires a mechanism for circularizing the initially highly eccentric orbit, and adjusting its inclination into the equatorial plane, most probably by a combination of atmospheric drag and tidal forces, although it is not clear that sufficient time is available for this to occur for Deimos. Capture also requires dissipation of energy. The current atmosphere of Mars is too thin to capture a Phobos-sized object by atmospheric braking. Geoffrey Landis has pointed out that the capture could have occurred if the original body was a binary asteroid that separated under tidal forces.

Phobos could be a second-generation Solar System object that coalesced in orbit after Mars formed, rather than forming concurrently out of the same birth cloud as Mars.

Another hypothesis is that Mars was once surrounded by many Phobos- and Deimos-sized bodies, perhaps ejected into orbit around it by a collision with a large planetesimal. The high porosity of the interior of Phobos (based on the density of 1.88 g/cm^{3}, voids are estimated to comprise 25 to 35 percent of Phobos's volume) is inconsistent with an asteroidal origin. Observations of Phobos in the thermal infrared suggest a composition containing mainly phyllosilicates, which are well known from the surface of Mars. The spectra are distinct from those of all classes of chondrite meteorites, again pointing away from an asteroidal origin. Both sets of findings support an origin of Phobos from material ejected by an impact on Mars that reaccreted in Martian orbit, similar to the prevailing theory for the origin of Earth's moon.

The moons of Mars may have started with a huge collision with a protoplanet one third the mass of Mars that formed a ring around Mars. The inner part of the ring formed a large moon. Gravitational interactions between this moon and the outer ring formed Phobos and Deimos. Later, the large moon crashed into Mars, but the two small moons remained in orbit. This theory agrees with the fine-grained surface of the moons and their high porosity. The outer disk would create fine-grained material. Simulations suggest the object colliding with Mars had to be within the size range of Ceres and Vesta because a larger impact would have created a more massive disc and moons that would have prevented the survival of tiny moons like Phobos and Deimos.

Most recently, Amirhossein Bagheri and his colleagues from ETH Zurich and US Naval Observatory, proposed a new hypothesis on the origin of the moons. By analyzing the seismic and orbital data from Mars InSight Mission and other missions, they proposed that the moons are born from the disruption of a common parent body around 1 to 2.7 billion years ago. The common progenitor of Phobos and Deimos was most probably hit by another object and shattered to form Phobos and Deimos. A 2022 paper suggests that it seems unlikely that Phobos and Deimos are split directly from a single ancestral moon. They use N-body simulations to show that the single ancestral moon scenario should result in an impact between the two moons, leading to a debris ring in 10^{4} years.

Another suggestion is that Mars was hit by an object from beyond the orbit of Saturn or Neptune, about 3% the mass of the planet and consisting of at least 30% and up to 70% water ice. This would create a disc around the planet with large amounts of water that cooled it down and changed the chemical composition of the rocks, likely producing a type of minerals called phyllosilicates.

== Exploration ==
=== Past attempts and proposals ===
While many Martian probes provided images and other data about Phobos and Deimos, only few were dedicated to these satellites and intended to perform a flyby or landing on the surface.

In 1988, two probes under the Soviet Phobos program were successfully launched, but neither conducted the intended jumping landings on Phobos and Deimos due to failures, although Phobos 2 successfully photographed Phobos. The post-Soviet Russian Fobos-Grunt probe was intended to be the first sample return mission from Phobos, but a rocket failure left it stranded in Earth orbit in 2011. Efforts to reactivate the craft were unsuccessful, and it fell back to Earth in an uncontrolled re-entry on 15 January 2012, over the Pacific Ocean, west of Chile.

In 1997 and 1998, the Aladdin mission was selected as a finalist in the NASA Discovery Program. The plan was to visit both Phobos and Deimos, and launch projectiles at the satellites. The probe would collect the ejecta as it performed a slow flyby. These samples would be returned to Earth for study three years later. Ultimately, NASA rejected this proposal in favor of MESSENGER, a probe to Mercury.

In 2007, the European Space Agency and EADS Astrium proposed and developed a mission to Phobos in 2016 with a lander and sample return, but this mission was never flown. Canadian Space Agency has been considering the Phobos Reconnaissance and International Mars Exploration (PRIME) mission to Phobos with orbiter and lander since 2007. Since 2013 NASA developed the Phobos Surveyor mission concept with an orbiter and a small rover. NASA's PADME mission was designed to conduct multiple flybys of the Martian moons, but was not chosen for development. Also, NASA assessed the OSIRIS-REx II, concept mission for a sample return from Phobos. Another sample return mission from Deimos, called Gulliver, has been conceptualized.

=== Current proposals ===
JAXA launched the Martian Moons eXploration (MMX) mission on 19 October 2026 to bring back the first samples from Phobos. The spacecraft will enter orbit around Mars, then transfer to Phobos, and land once or twice and gather sand-like regolith particles using a simple pneumatic system. The lander mission aims to retrieve a minimum 10 g (0.35 oz) of samples. The spacecraft will then take off from Phobos and make several flybys of the smaller moon Deimos before sending the Return Module back to Earth, arriving in July 2029.

== Gallery ==
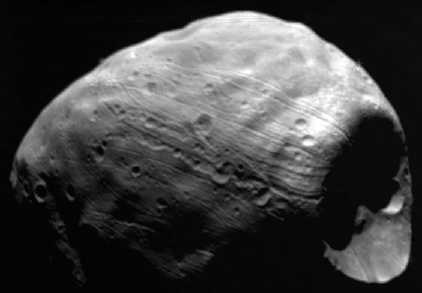
Phobos, with Stickney Crater on the right (2003)

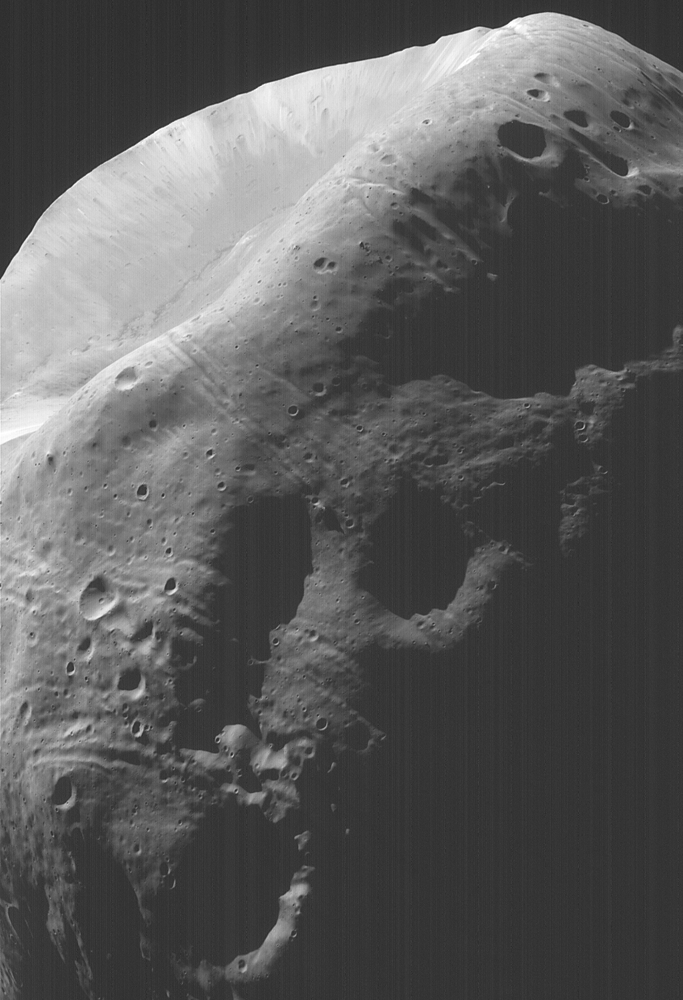
Phobos (1998)

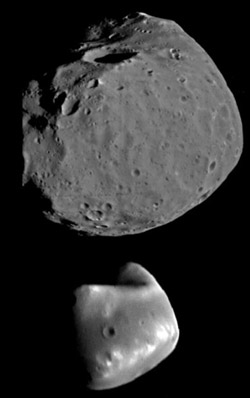
Comparison between Phobos (top) and Deimos (bottom) (2005)

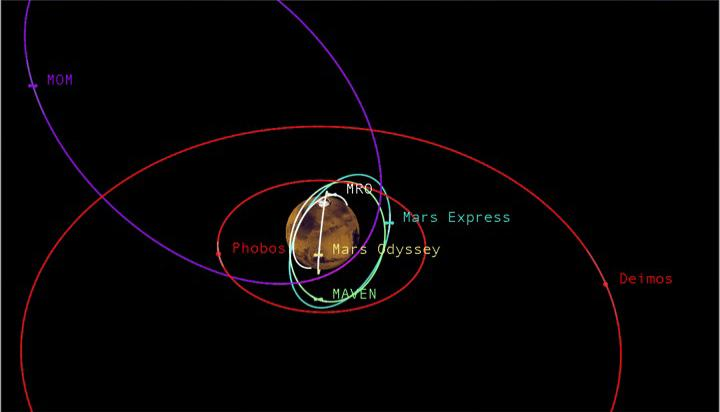
The orbits of moons and spacecraft orbiting Mars.

== See also ==
- List of missions to the moons of Mars
- Mars trojan – Celestial bodies that share the orbit of Mars
- Satellites of Mars
- Transit of Deimos from Mars – Transit of a moon of Mars
- Transit of Phobos from Mars – Transit of a moon from Mars
