= List of features on Phobos and Deimos =

Features of the moons of Mars

Features on Phobos and Deimos are listed in the following articles:

- List of features on Phobos
- List of features on Deimos
