= U Pegasi =

Binary star in the constellation Pegasus

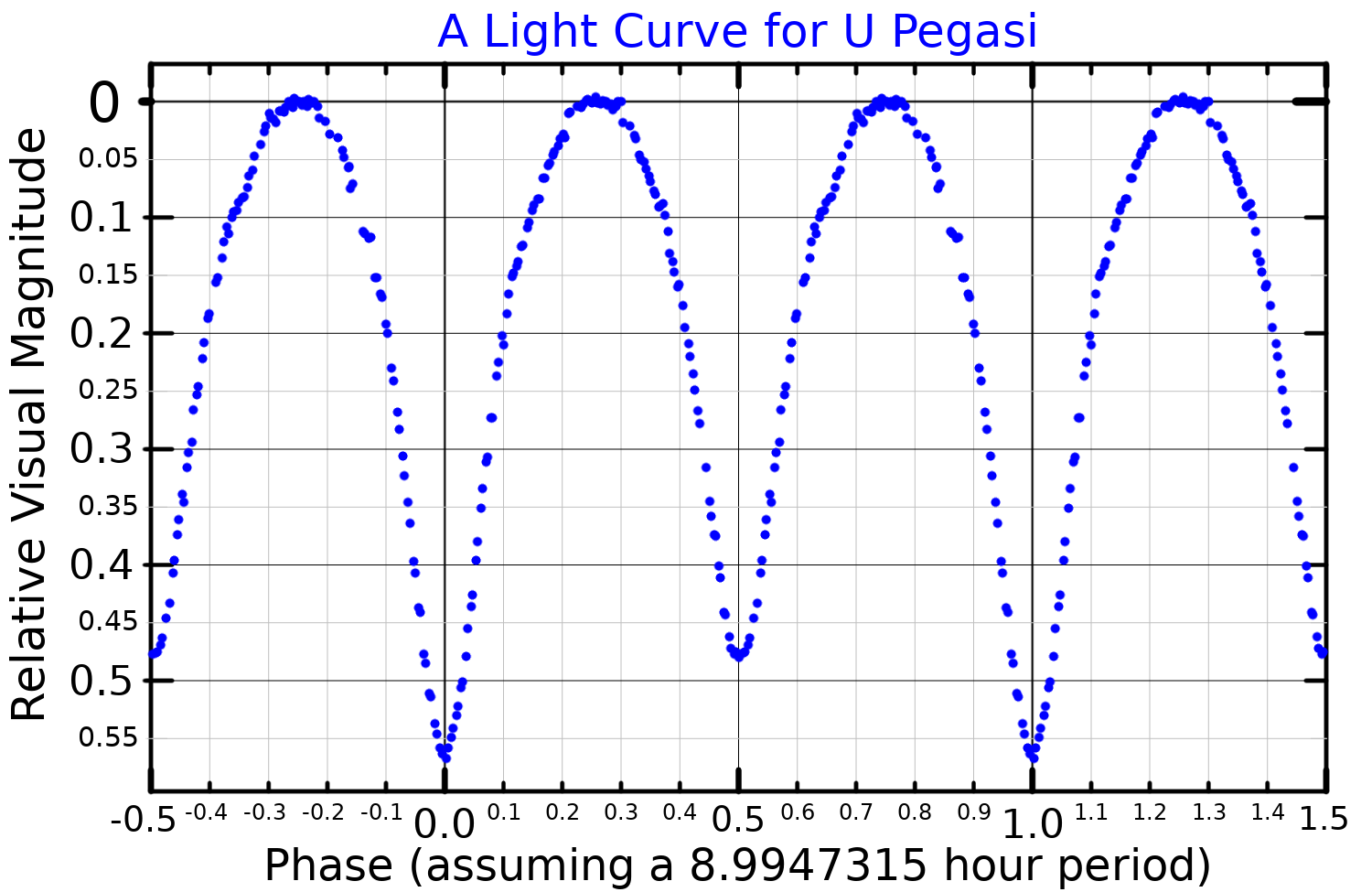
- A visual band light curve for U Pegasi, plotted from data published by Zhai et al. (1984)

Observation data Epoch J2000.0 Equinox ICRS
- Constellation: Pegasus
- Right ascension: 23^{h} 57^{m} 58.477^{s}
- Declination: +15° 57′ 10.09″
- Apparent magnitude (V): 9.23; Min I: 10.07; Min II: 9.73

Characteristics
- Evolutionary stage: main sequence
- Spectral type: G2 V + G2: V:
- B−V color index: 0.648±0.033
- Variable type: W UMa

Astrometry
Radial velocity (R_{v})	−28.5±4.7 km/s
Proper motion (μ)	RA: 34.598 mas/yr Dec.: 17.389 mas/yr
Parallax (π)	5.4708±0.0193 mas
Distance	596 ± 2 ly (182.8 ± 0.6 pc)
Absolute magnitude (M_{V})	3.88

Orbit
Period (P)	8.995 h
Eccentricity (e)	0 (assumed)
Inclination (i)	76.1°
Semi-amplitude (K_{1}) (primary)	77.6±1.1 km/s
Semi-amplitude (K_{2}) (secondary)	246.5±1.4 km/s

Details

Primary
Mass	1.224±0.003 M_{☉}
Radius	1.149±0.009 R_{☉}
Luminosity	1.29 L_{☉}
Surface gravity (log g)	4.32 cgs
Temperature	5,860 (polar) K

Secondary
Mass	0.379±0.002 M_{☉}
Radius	0.744±0.002 R_{☉}
Luminosity	0.55 L_{☉}
Surface gravity (log g)	4.27 cgs
Temperature	5,785±7 (polar) K

Other designations
- U Peg, BD+15° 4915, HIP 118149, SAO 108933, PPM 143009, WDS J23579+1557A

Database references
SIMBAD	data

U Pegasi is a binary star system in the constellation of Pegasus, abbreviated U Peg. The pair form an eclipsing binary with a combined peak apparent visual magnitude of 9.23, which is far too faint to be visible to the naked eye. During the primary eclipse the magnitude decreases to 10.07, while the secondary eclipse only drops to magnitude 9.73. This system is located at a distance of approximately 596 light years from the Sun based on parallax measurements, but is drifting closer with a radial velocity of around −28.5 km/s.

The variable luminosity of this system was discovered by S. C. Chandler in 1895. He found it to have a continuously varying light curve with a period of 5.192 h. Observing the star photometrically, in 1898 E. C. Pickering and O. Wendell determined a longer period of 8.995 h. H. Shapley published orbital measures for this eclipsing binary in 1913, estimating their relative luminosities and radii. It was determined to be a variable of the W Ursae Majoris type, and in 1945 the orbital period was shown to vary over time.

== Properties ==
This is a double-lined spectroscopic binary star system with an orbital period of 8.995 hours. Their orbital separation is just 2.533 R_{☉}. The inclination of the orbital plane is at an angle of 76.1° to the plane of the sky from the Earth, so the components are seen to eclipse each other during an orbit. The deeper eclipse occurs when the cooler secondary overlaps the primary star. They belong to the W sub-class of W UMa eclipsing variables.

The larger member of this system is a G-type main-sequence star with a stellar classification of G2 V. The primary has a larger mass and radius than the Sun, while the secondary component is significantly smaller and less massive. The pair are in over-contact by about 14.9%, which allows a considerable amount of energy transfer between the two stars. As a consequence, the two components show similar effective temperatures and spectral classes. The cooler component displays a significant level of star spot activity that causes the light curve to vary anomalously over time. The system has an X-ray luminosity of 1.449×10^{30} erg·s^{−1}.

The long term change in the orbital period may be explained by mass transfer between the components, with the matter streaming from the more massive to the less massive star. The overall period change indicates this mass transfer is occurring at an average rate of (3.7±0.3)×10^{−8} M_{☉}·yr^{−1}. Periodicity in the change rate suggests there may be a third orbiting component in the system with a period of 62 ± 3 years. If so, it would need to have a mass of at least 0.32±0.13 M_{☉}, which is high enough to be a star.
