= Swift (Deimian crater) =

Crater on Deimos

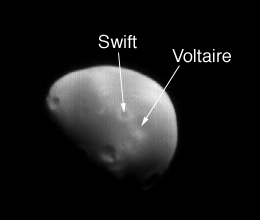
- Feature type: Impact crater
- Location: 12.5°N 358.2°W
- Dimensions: 1 to 3 km (0.62 to 1.86 mi) across (depending on your source)
- Naming: Jonathan Swift

Swift is an impact crater on Mars's moon Deimos. It is about 3 km (1.9 mi) in diameter. Swift is named after Jonathan Swift, whose 1726 book Gulliver's Travels predicted the existence of two moons of Mars. Swift is one of two named features on Deimos, the other being Voltaire. On 10 July 2006, Mars Global Surveyor took an image of Deimos from 22,985 km (14,282 mi) away showing Swift.

== See also ==
- Voltaire (crater)
- Moons of Mars
- Phobos (moon)
- Deimos (moon)
