= Stickney (crater) =

Largest crater on Phobos

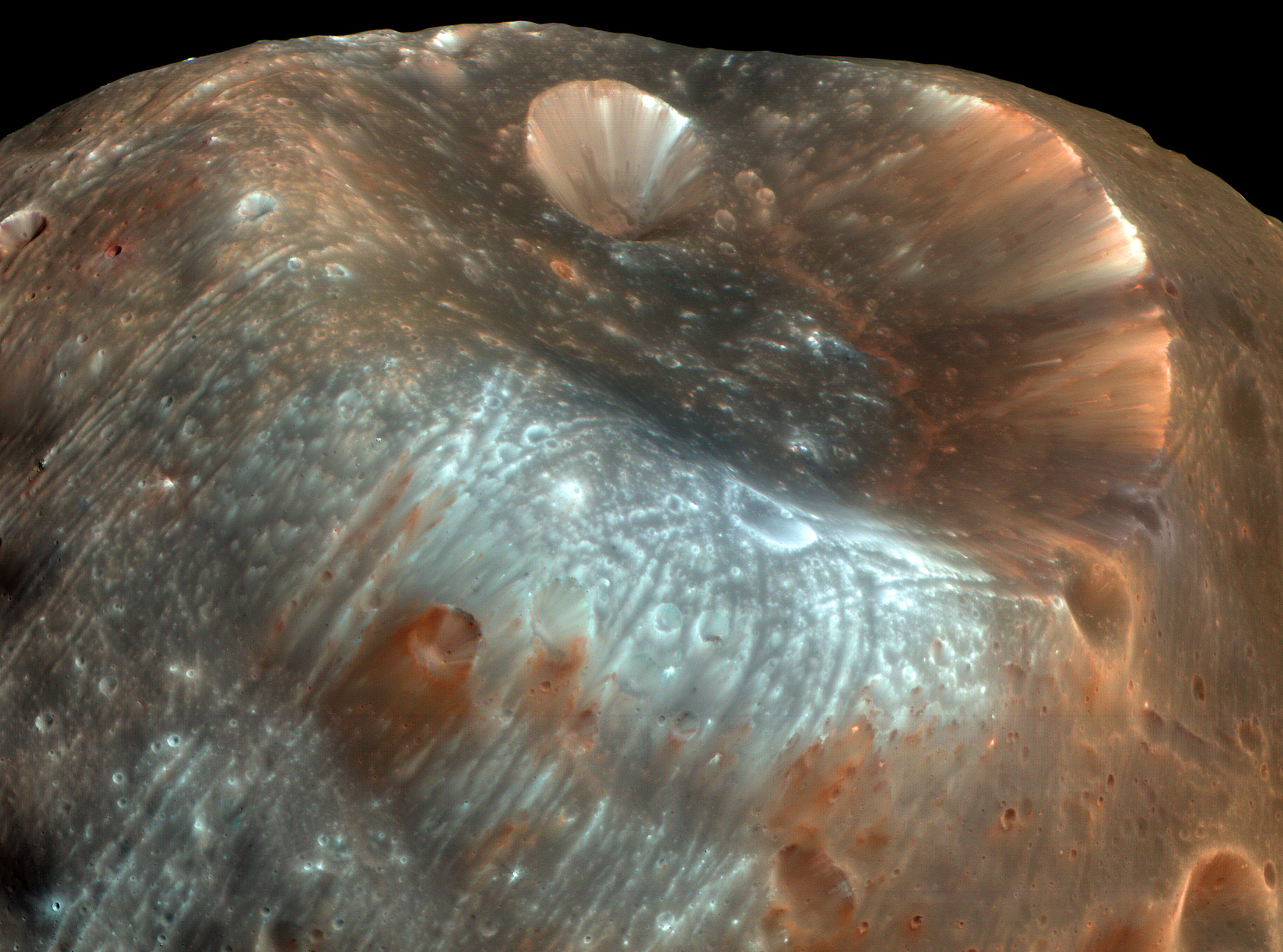
- Heavily saturated false color image of Stickney with the smaller crater Limtoc within it, as seen by MRO on 23 March 2008.
- Feature type: Impact crater
- Location: 1°N 49°W
- Diameter: 9 km (5.6 mi)
- Discoverer: Asaph Hall
- Naming: Chloe Angeline Stickney Hall

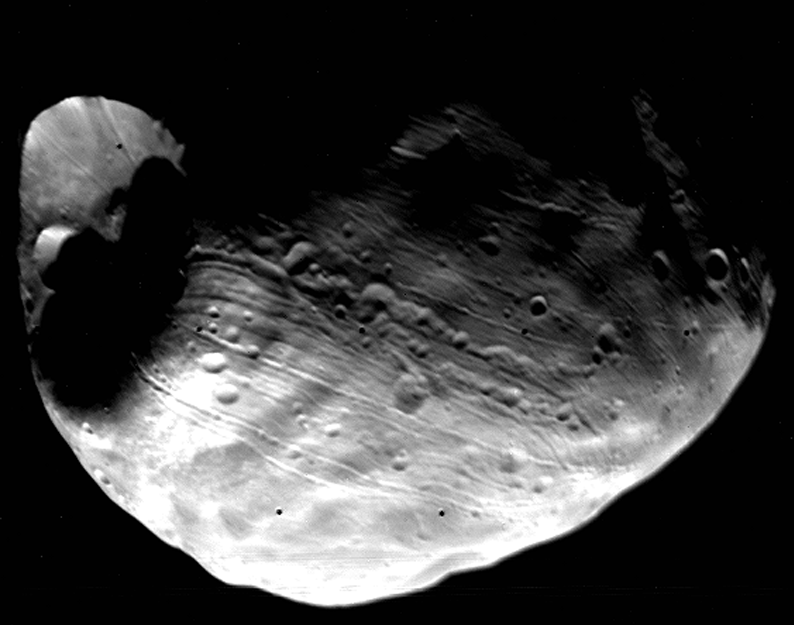
Stickney on Phobos (at left) (Viking orbiter, 10 June 1977)

Stickney is the largest Impact crater on Phobos, the inner satellite of Mars. It is 9 km (5.6 mi) in diameter, taking up a substantial proportion of the moon's surface.

== Naming ==
The crater is named after mathematician Chloe Angeline Hall (née Stickney), the wife of Phobos's discoverer Asaph Hall, whose support was credited by her husband as critical for his discovery of the moon. The crater was named in 1973, based on Mariner 9 images, by an IAU nomenclature committee chaired by Carl Sagan.

== Formation ==
There are two models for the age of Stickney, based on the differing possible dates at which Phobos began to orbit around Mars. If Phobos has been orbiting for 4.3 Ga (billion years) then Stickney formed 4.2 Ga ago, but if Phobos has only been orbiting for 3.5 Ga then it formed 2.6 Ga ago. The impact created a large amount of ejecta which escaped Phobos's gravity and entered into orbit around Mars for a period not exceeding 1000 years (some crashed back onto Phobos, and creating secondary impact craters). The majority of craters on Phobos that are smaller than 600 meters in diameter were caused by these secondary impacts.

== Physical features ==
Grooves and crater chains appear to radiate from Stickney. One hypothesis suggests that they were formed as a result of stresses from the impact that created the crater; if true, this suggests that the impact nearly destroyed Phobos itself. There are however numerous other hypotheses as to how they were made, such as that they were formed by material ejected from impacts on Mars, that they were created by tidal forces exerted by Mars, or even that they were created by boulders rolling along Phobos's surface following the Stickney impact.

Regardless of the causes of these grooves, the impact of the object which created Stickney was large enough to have potentially destroyed Phobos; a 2016 study by Syal et al. found that the high porosity of the moon was critical in preventing it from being destroyed during the collision. It is possible that the area underneath Stickney is much denser and less porous than the rest of Phobos, though models of the moon's interior vary on this.

Stickney has a noticeable lineated texture on its interior walls, caused by landslides from materials falling into the crater. There is a noticeable blue spectral coloration on the south-western edge of the crater, which is theorized to be a relatively thin layer of rock. Said coloration was likely caused by a combination of material from Stickney itself and from the smaller, interior crater Limtoc.

== See also ==
- Moons of Mars
- Deimos (moon)
