= Voltaire (crater) =

Impact crater on Mars's moon Deimos

Voltaire crater
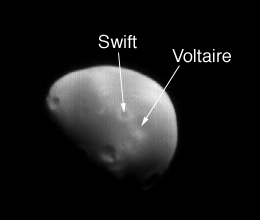
- Feature type: Impact crater
- Location: 22°N 3.5°W
- Dimensions: 1.9 to 3 km (1.2 to 1.9 mi) across (depending upon the source).
- Naming: Voltaire

Voltaire is an impact crater on Mars's moon Deimos and is approximately 3 km (1.9 mi) across. Voltaire crater is named after François-Marie Arouet, a French Enlightenment writer who was better known by the pen name Voltaire, who in his 1752 short story "Micromégas" predicted that Mars had two moons. Voltaire crater is one of two named features on Deimos, the other being Swift crater. On 10 July 2006, Mars Global Surveyor took an image of Deimos from 22,985 km (14,282 mi) away showing Voltaire crater and Swift crater.

== Impact ==
According to a 2016 study by Nayak et al, the impact that created Voltaire was sufficient to cause large amounts of ejecta that remained in Mars orbit for several hundred years, before a substantial amount of it collided back with Deimos. These impacts were theorised by this study to have been potentially extensive enough to resurface large areas of Deimos, which complicates efforts to accurately date the moon's surface.

== See also ==
- Swift (Deimian crater)
- Moons of Mars
- Phobos (moon)
- Deimos (moon)
