= List of adjectivals and demonyms of astronomical bodies =

The adjectival forms of the names of astronomical bodies are not always easily predictable. Attested adjectival forms of the larger bodies are listed below, along with the two small Martian moons; in some cases they are accompanied by their demonymic equivalents, which denote hypothetical inhabitants of these bodies.

For Classical (Greco-Roman) names, the adjectival and demonym forms normally derive from the oblique stem, which may differ from the nominative form used in English for the noun form. For instance, for a large portion of names ending in -s, the oblique stem and therefore the English adjective changes the -s to a -d, -t, or -r, as in Mars–Martian, Pallas–Palladian and Ceres–Cererian; (Note: This is reflected in Russian Паллада Pallada 'Pallas' and Церера Tserera 'Ceres', as well as in Italian Pallade 'Pallas' and Cerere 'Ceres', as in these (and several other) languages the nominal forms of the names often also reflect the oblique. This is not always the case, however – for Mars, Italian Marte parallels the English adjective but Russian Марс Mars parallels the English noun.) occasionally an -n has been lost historically from the nominative form, and reappears in the oblique and therefore in the English adjective, as in Pluto–Plutonian and Atlas–Atlantean.

Many of the more recent or more obscure names are only attested in mythological or literary contexts, rather than in specifically astronomical contexts. Forms ending in -ish or -ine, such as "Puckish", are not included below if a derivation in -an is also attested. Rare forms, or forms only attested with spellings not in keeping with the IAU-approved spelling (such as c for k), are shown in italics.

Note on pronunciation

The suffix -ian is always unstressed: that is, /iən/. The related ending -ean, from an e in the root plus a suffix -an, has traditionally been stressed (that is, /ˈiːən/) if the e is long ē in Latin (or is from ⟨η⟩ ē in Greek); but if the e is short in Latin, the suffix is pronounced the same as -ian. In practice forms ending in -ean may be pronounced as if they were spelled -ian even if the e is long in Latin. This dichotomy should be familiar from the dual pronunciations of Caribbean as /ˌkærɪˈbiːən/ KARR-ə-BEE-ən and /kəˈrɪbiən/ kə-RIB-i-ən.

== Generic bodies ==
Name	Adjective	Demonym
asteroid	asteroidal, asteroidic	Asterite
comet	cometary	
cosmos, universe	cosmic, cosmian, universal	
ecliptic	ecliptical, zodiacal	
galaxy	galactic, galactian	
meteoroid	meteoroidal	
nebula	nebular	
planet	planetary, planetic	
planetoid	planetoidal	
quasar	quasaric, quasarian	
sky	celestial	
star	astral, sidereal, siderean, stellar	
supernova	supernovan	
space		Spacer

== Constellations ==
Derivative forms of constellations are used primarily for meteor showers. The genitive forms of the constellations are used to name stars. (See List of constellations.) Other adjectival forms are less common.

Name	Adjective	Derivative
Andromeda	Andromedan	Andromedid
Aquarius	Aquarian	Aquariid
Aries	Arian	Arietid
Auriga	Aurigal	Aurigid
Boötes		Bootid
Cancer	Cancerian	Cancrid
Carina	Carinal	Carinid
Capricorn	Capricornian	Capricornid
Centaurus	Centaurean, Centaurian	Centaurid
Cetus		Cetid
Coma Berenices	Comal	Coma Berenicid
Corona Austrina	Coronal	Corona Austrinid
Crux	Crucial	Crucid
Cygnus	Cygnean	Cygnid
Dorado		Doradid
Draco	Draconic	Draconid
Eridanus		Eridanid
Gemini	Geminian	Geminid
Hydra, Hydrus		Hydrid
Leo	Leonic, Leonian, Leonean	Leonid
Leo Minor		Leo Minorid
Libra	Libran	Librid
Lyra		Lyrid
Monoceros		Monocerotid
Norma		Normid
Ophiuchus		Ophiuchid
Orion		Orionid
Pavo		Pavonid
Pegasus	Pegasean, Pegasarian	Pegasid
Perseus		Perseid
Phoenix	Phoenicean	Phoenicid
Pisces	Piscean, Piscian	Piscid
Piscis Austrinus		Piscis Austrinid
Puppis		Puppid
Sagittarius	Sagittarian	Sagittariid
Scorpius	Scorpian, Scorpionic	Scorpiid
Taurus	Taurean, Taurian	Taurid
Ursa Major, Ursa Minor	Ursal	Ursid
Vela	Velar, Velic	Velid
Virgo	Virginal, Virginian	Virginid
zodiac	zodiacal	

== Sun ==
Name	Adjective	Demonym	Prefix
Sun, Sol, Helios	Solar, Heliacal, Phoebean, Phebean	Solarian	helio-

== Planets ==
Name	Adjective	Demonym	Prefix
Mercury; Hermes (in the evening), Apollo (in the morning)	Mercurian, Mercurial, Hermean/Hermeian, Cyllenian, Cyllenean	Mercurian, Hermean	hermeo-
Venus; Hesperus, Vesper (in the evening), Eosphorus, Phosphorus, Phosphor (in the morning), Lucifer (in the day)	Venerian, Venusian, Cytherean, Cytherian, Hesperian, Luciferian, Phosphorian, Aphroditan	Venusian, Cytherean	cythero-
Earth; Terra, Tellus, Gaia, Gaea	Earthly, Terran, Terrestrial, Terrene, Tellurian, Telluric, Gaian, Gaean	Earthling, Terran, Tellurian, Earthian, Earther, Earthican, Gaian, Gaean	geo-
Mars	Martian, Martial, Arean	Martian	areo-
Jupiter	Jovian, Jupiterian, Zeusian	Jovian	zeno-
Saturn	Saturnian, Saturnine, Cronian, Kronian, Saturnial	Saturnian	crono-
Uranus	Uranian, Caelian	Uranian	urano-
Neptune	Neptunian, Neptunial, Poseidean	Neptunian	poseido-

== Minor planets ==
Name	Adjective	Demonym
Ceres	Cererian, Cererean	Cererian
Eris	Eridian	
Haumea	Haumean	
Makemake	Makemakean	
Orcus	Orcean, Orcan	
Pallas	Palladian	
Pluto	Plutonic, Plutonian	Plutonian
Sedna	Sednian	
Vesta	Vestian, Vestan, Vestalian	Vestan, Vestian

== Moons ==
Earth and Mars
Name	Adjective	Demonym	Prefix
Moon (Luna, Selene)	Lunar, Selenian, Cynthian	Lunarian, Selenite	seleno-
Deimos	Deimian		
Phobos	Phobian		

Jupiter
Name	Adjective, demonym
Callisto	Callistoan, Callistonian
Europa	Europan
Ganymede	Ganymedean, Ganymedian
Io	Ionian

Saturn
Name	Adjective, demonym
Dione	Dionean
Enceladus	Enceladean, Enceladan
Hyperion	Hyperionian
Iapetus	Iapetian, Japetian
Mimas	Mimantean, Mimantian
Rhea	Rhean
Tethys	Tethyan
Titan	Titanian /taɪˈteɪniən/, Titanean

Uranus
Name	Adjective, demonym
Ariel	Arielian
Miranda	Mirandan, Mirandian
Oberon	Oberonian
Titania	Titanian /tɪˈtɑːniən/
Umbriel	Umbrielian

Neptune, Pluto and Eris
Name	Adjective, demonym
Triton	Tritonian
Charon	Charonian
Dysnomia	Dysnomian

== Galaxies ==
Name	Adjective
Milky Way Galaxy	Galactic, Lacteal
Andromeda Galaxy	Andromedan
Magellanic Clouds	Magellanic
