= Deimos (moon) =

Smaller and outer moon of Mars

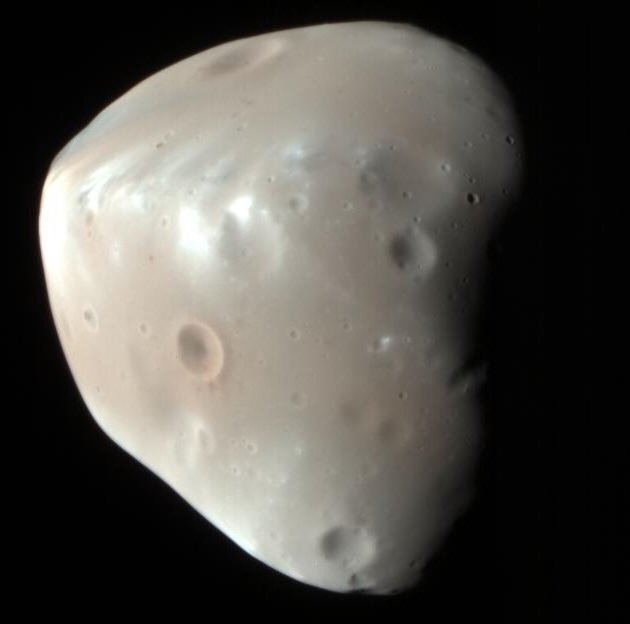
- Deimos, captured by the Mars Reconnaissance Orbiter in false color

Discovery
- Discovered by: Asaph Hall
- Discovery date: 12 August 1877

Designations
- Designation: Mars II
- Pronunciation: /ˈdaɪməs/ to /ˈdiːməs/ or as Greek Δεῖμος (approximated /ˈdeɪmɒs/)
- Named after: Δεῖμος
- Adjectives: Deimian /ˈdaɪmiən/
- Symbol: (rare)

Orbital characteristics
- Epoch 2020 January 1.0 TDB (JD 2458849.5)
- Periapsis: 23450.46 km
- Apoapsis: 23464.54 km
- Semi-major axis: 23457.50+0.99 −1.07 km (6.92 Mars radii)
- Eccentricity: 0.0003±0.0001
- Orbital period (sidereal): 30.2984±0.002 h
- Average orbital speed: 1.3513 km/s
- Inclination: 1.79°±0.02° (to the local Laplace plane); 0.93° (to Mars's equator); 27.58° (to the ecliptic)
- Satellite of: Mars

Physical characteristics
- Dimensions: 16.08 × 11.78 × 10.22 km (± 0.16 × 0.12 × 0.10 km)
- Mean radius: 6.27±0.07 km (Note: This is the radius of a sphere with equivalent volume.)
- Surface area: 522±8 km^{2}
- Volume: 1033±19 km^{3}
- Mass: (1.441±0.042)×10^{15} kg (Note: Calculated from its standard gravitational parameter GM = (0.962±0.028)×10^{−4} km^{3}/s^{2}.)
- Mean density: 1.395±0.048 g/cm^{3} (calculated)
- Surface gravity: 0.003 m/s^{2} (306 μ g)
- Escape velocity: 5.556 m/s (20 km/h)
- Synodic rotation period: Synchronous
- Albedo: 0.068±0.007 (geometric); 0.02652±0.00305 (spherical) (Note: Spherical albedo calculated from the geometric albedo p (0.068±0.007) and the phase integral q (0.39±0.02): $p\cdot q$)
- Temperature: ≈ 233 K
- Apparent magnitude: 12.89

Deimos (/ˈdaɪməs/) is the smaller and outer of the two natural satellites of Mars, the other being Phobos. Deimos has a mean radius of 6.2 km (3.9 mi) and takes 30.3 hours to orbit Mars. Deimos is 23,457.50 km (14,575.81 mi) from Mars, much farther than Mars's other moon, Phobos. It is named after Deimos, the Ancient Greek god and personification of dread and terror.

== Discovery and etymology ==
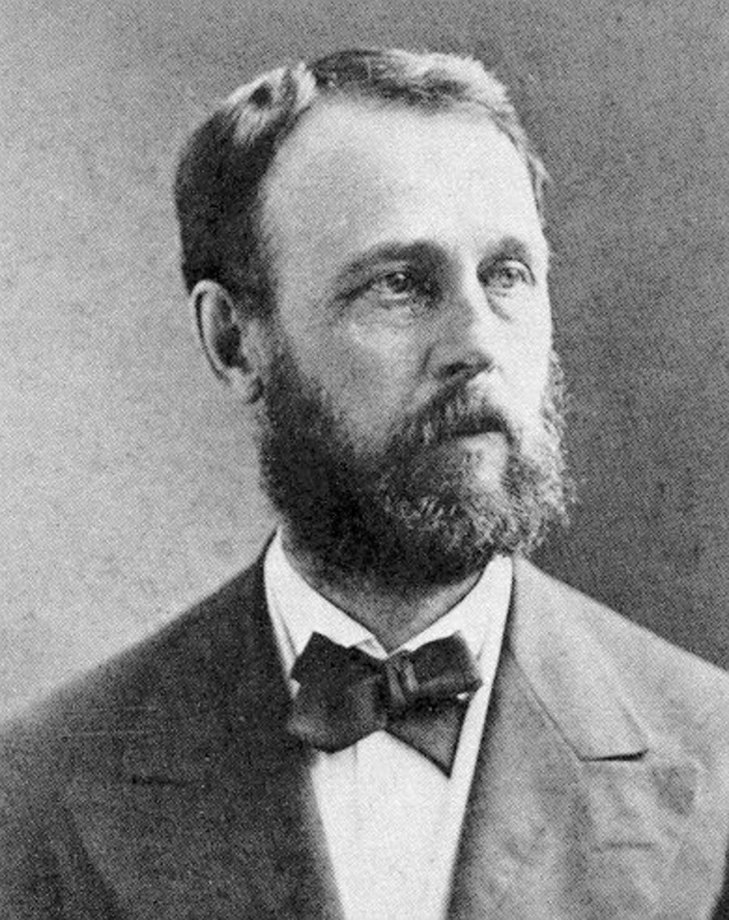
Asaph Hall III, discoverer of Deimos

Deimos was discovered by Asaph Hall at the United States Naval Observatory in Washington, D.C., on 12 August 1877, at about 07:48 UTC. (Note: Given in contemporary sources as "11 August 14:40" Washington Mean Time, using a pre-1925 astronomical convention of beginning a day at noon, so 12 hours must be added to get the actual local mean time.) Hall, who also discovered Phobos shortly afterwards, had been specifically searching for Martian moons at the time.

The moon is named after Deimos, a figure representing dread in Greek mythology. The name was suggested by academic Henry Madan, who drew from Book XV of the Iliad, where Ares (Greek counterpart of the Roman god Mars) summons Dread (Deimos) and Fear (Phobos).

Planetary moons other than Earth's were never given symbols in the astronomical literature. Denis Moskowitz, a software engineer who designed most of the dwarf planet symbols, proposed a Greek delta (the initial of Deimos) combined with Mars's spear as the symbol of Deimos. This symbol is not widely used.

== Origin ==
The origin of Mars's moons is unknown and the hypotheses are controversial. The main hypotheses are that they formed either by capture or by accretion.

Because of the postulated similarity to the composition of C- or D-type asteroids, one hypothesis is that the moons may be objects captured into Martian orbit from the asteroid belt, with orbits that have been circularized either by atmospheric drag or tidal forces, as capture requires dissipation of energy. The current Martian atmosphere is too thin to capture a Phobos-sized object by atmospheric braking. Geoffrey Landis has pointed out that the capture could have occurred if the original body was a binary asteroid that separated due to tidal forces. The main alternative hypothesis is that the moons accreted in the present position. Another hypothesis is that Mars was once surrounded by many Phobos- and Deimos-sized bodies, perhaps ejected into orbit around it by a collision with a planetesimal.

In 2021, Amirhossein Bagheri (ETH Zurich), Amir Khan (ETH Zurich), Michael Efroimsky (US Naval Observatory) and their colleagues proposed a new hypothesis on the origin of the moons. By analyzing the seismic and orbital data from the Mars InSight Mission and other missions, they proposed that the moons were born from the disruption of a common parent body around 1 to 2.7 billion years ago. The common progenitor of Phobos and Deimos was most probably hit by another object and shattered to form Phobos and Deimos.

== Physical characteristics ==
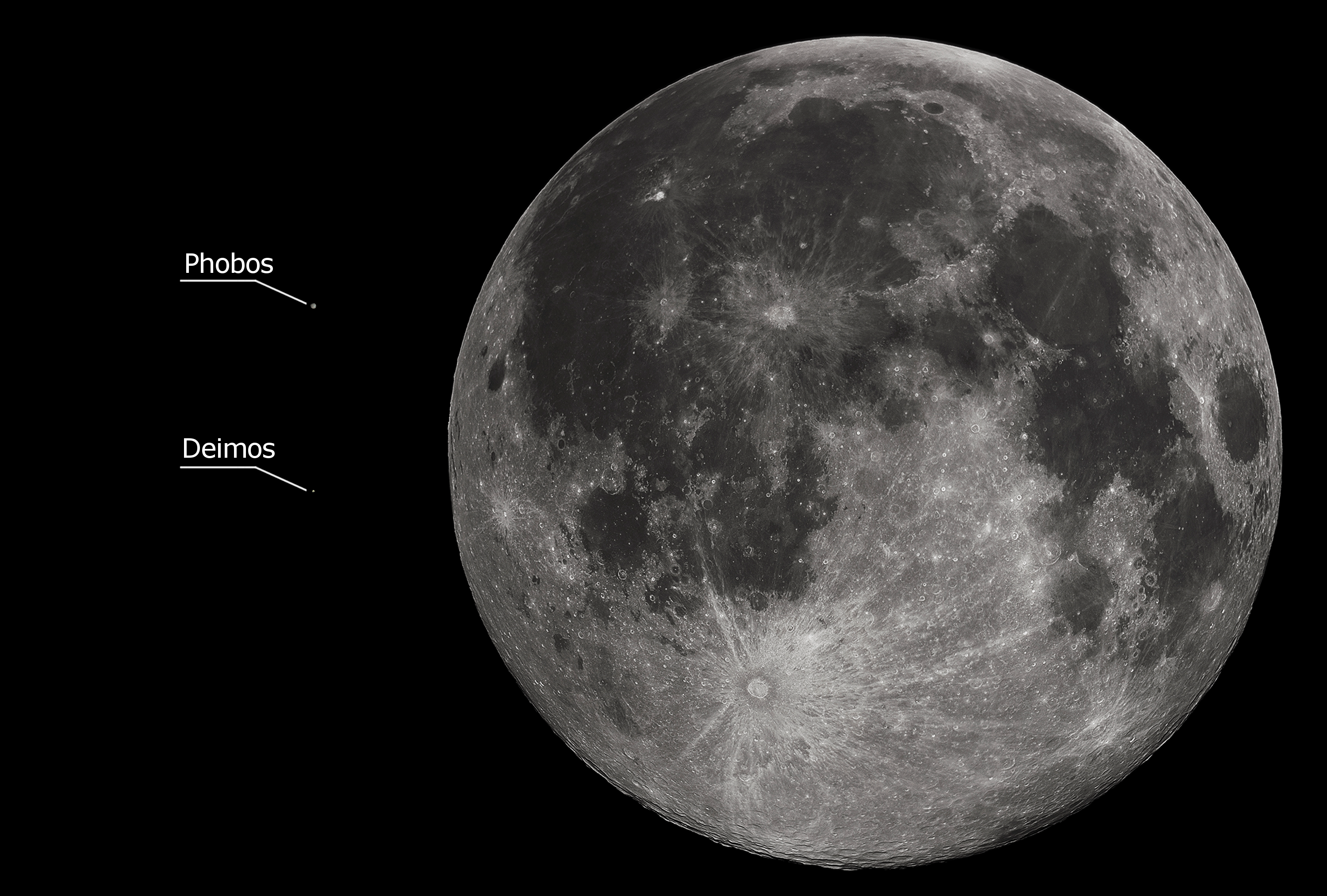
Size comparison between Phobos, Deimos and the Moon (right)

Deimos is a gray-colored body. Like most bodies of its size, Deimos is highly non-spherical with triaxial dimensions of 16.1 km × 11.8 km × 10.2 km (10.0 mi × 7.3 mi × 6.3 mi), corresponding to a mean diameter of 12.5 km (7.8 mi) which makes it about 57% the size of Phobos. Deimos is composed of rock rich in carbonaceous material, much like C-type asteroids and carbonaceous chondrite meteorites. It is cratered, but the surface is noticeably smoother than that of Phobos, caused by the partial filling of craters with regolith. The regolith is highly porous and has a radar-estimated density of only 1.471 g/cm^{3}.

The escape velocity from Deimos is 5.6 m/s. The apparent magnitude of Deimos is 12.45.

=== Named geological features ===
Only two geological features on Deimos have been given names. The craters Swift and Voltaire are named after writers who speculated on the existence of two Martian moons before Phobos and Deimos were discovered.

DEIMOS
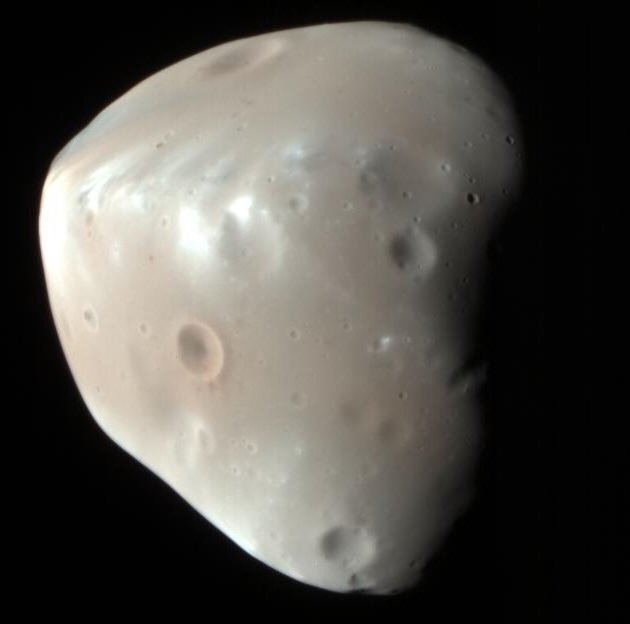
Deimos Crater Names (view • discuss)

Craters	Coordinates	Diameter (km)	Approval Year	Eponym	Ref
Swift	12.5°N 1.8°E	1	1973	Jonathan Swift; Irish writer (1667–1745)	WGPSN
Voltaire	22°N 3.5°W	1.9	1973	Voltaire; French writer (1694–1778)	WGPSN

== Orbital characteristics ==
Orbits of Phobos and Deimos (to scale)

Deimos's orbit is nearly circular and is close to Mars's equatorial plane. Deimos is possibly an asteroid that was perturbed by Jupiter into an orbit that allowed it to be captured by Mars, though this hypothesis is still controversial and disputed. Both Deimos and Phobos have very circular orbits which lie almost exactly in Mars's equatorial plane, and hence a capture origin requires a mechanism for circularizing the initially highly eccentric orbit, and adjusting its inclination into the equatorial plane, most likely by a combination of atmospheric drag and tidal forces; it is not clear that sufficient time was available for this to have occurred for Deimos.

Curiosity's view of the Mars moons: Phobos passing in front of Deimos in real-time (video-gif, 1 August 2013)

As seen from Mars, Deimos would have an angular diameter of no more than 2.5 minutes (sixty minutes make one degree), one twelfth of the width of the Moon as seen from Earth, and would therefore appear almost star-like to the naked eye. At its brightest ("full moon") it would be about as bright as Venus is from Earth; at the first- or third-quarter phase it would be about as bright as Vega. With a small telescope, a Martian observer could see Deimos's phases, which take 1.2648 days (Deimos's synodic period) to run their course.

Unlike Phobos, which orbits so quickly that it rises in the west and sets in the east, Deimos rises in the east and sets in the west, slower than Mars's rotation speed. The Sun-synodic orbital period of Deimos of about 30.4 hours exceeds the Martian solar day ("sol") of about 24.7 hours by such a small amount that 2.48 days (2.41 sols) elapse between its rising and setting for an equatorial observer. From Deimos-rise to Deimos-rise (or setting to setting), 5.466 days (5.320 sols) elapse.

Because Deimos's orbit is relatively close to Mars and has only a very small inclination to Mars's equator, it cannot be seen from Martian latitudes greater than 82.7°.

Deimos's orbit is slowly getting larger, because it is far enough away from Mars and because of tidal acceleration. It is expected to eventually escape Mars's gravity.

=== Solar transits ===
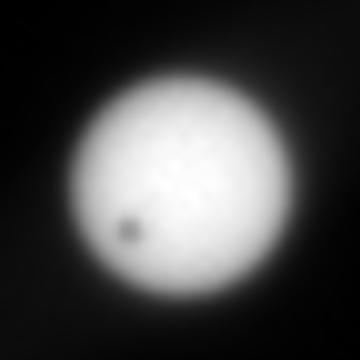
Deimos transits the Sun – as viewed by the Mars rover Opportunity (4 March 2004)

Deimos regularly passes in front of the Sun as seen from Mars. It is too small to cause a total eclipse, appearing only as a small black dot moving across the Sun. Its angular diameter is only about 2.5 times the angular diameter of Venus during a transit of Venus from Earth. On 4 March 2004 a transit of Deimos was photographed by Mars rover Opportunity, and on 13 March 2004 a transit was photographed by Mars rover Spirit.

== Exploration ==
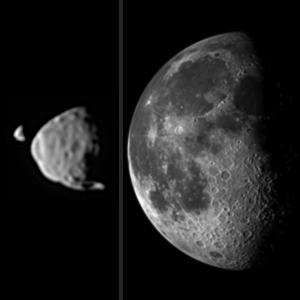
Deimos and Phobos as seen from Mars, compared in apparent size to the Moon as seen from Earth. If they would be as far away from Mars as the Moon from Earth, they would appear as faint star-like features in the Martian sky.

Overall, its exploration history is similar to those of Mars and of Phobos. Deimos has been photographed close-up by several spacecraft whose primary mission has been to photograph Mars, including in March 2023 during a rare close encounter by the Emirates Mars Mission. No landings on Deimos have been made.

In 1997 and 1998, the proposed Aladdin mission was selected as a finalist in the NASA Discovery Program. The plan was to visit both Phobos and Deimos, and launch projectiles at the satellites. The probe would collect the ejecta as it performed a slow flyby (~1 km/s). These samples would be returned to Earth for study three years later. The principal investigator was Carle M. Pieters of Brown University. The total mission cost, including launch vehicle and operations was $247.7 million. Ultimately, the mission chosen to fly was MESSENGER, a probe to the planet Mercury.

In 2008, NASA Glenn Research Center began studying a Phobos and Deimos sample-return mission that would use solar electric propulsion. The study gave rise to the "Hall" mission concept, a New Frontiers-class mission currently under further study.

Also, the sample-return mission called Gulliver has been conceptualized and dedicated to Deimos, in which 1 kilogram (2.2 pounds) of material from Deimos would be returned to Earth.

Another concept of sample-return mission from Phobos and Deimos is OSIRIS-REx 2, which would use heritage from the first OSIRIS-REx.

In March 2014, a Discovery class mission was proposed to place an orbiter in Mars orbit by 2021 and study Phobos and Deimos. It was called Phobos And Deimos & Mars Environment (PADME).

Human exploration of Deimos could serve as a catalyst for the human exploration of Mars. Recently, it was proposed that the sands of Deimos or Phobos could serve as a valuable material for aerobraking in the colonization of Mars. See Phobos for more detail.

ISRO's Mars Orbiter Mission (MOM) captured pictures of the far side on Deimos. The far side was rarely pictured because most Mars missions orbit Mars closer than Deimos, so that they only see the Mars-facing side of the moon. But the highly elliptical orbit of MOM allowed it to capture the far side.

In April 2023, astronomers released close-up global images, for the first time, of Deimos that were taken by the Mars Hope orbiter. Observations reported by this mission contravene the captured asteroid hypothesis and indicate basaltic planetary origin of Deimos.

During its gravity assist from Mars en route to 65803 Didymos, the ESA's Hera took observations of Deimos in March 2025, approaching at a distance of 300 km (190 mi).

The JAXA MMX Mission to Phobos and Deimos was launched in October 2026. It will make flybys of Deimos to investigate its composition and structure, as well as performing a sample return on Phobos and placing a rover on the surface of Phobos.

== See also ==
- List of missions to the moons of Mars
- List of natural satellites
- Moons of Mars – Natural satellites of the planet Mars
- Phobos and Deimos in fiction – Depictions of the planet
- Transit of Deimos from Mars – Transit of a moon of Mars
