= Michael Efroimsky =

American astronomer of Russian origin

Michael Efroimsky (Russian: Михаил Эфроимский) is an American astronomer of Russian origin. His research interests are in celestial mechanics and Planetary Science. He is working as a Research Scientist at the US Naval Observatory in Washington DC.

Michael Efroimsky is a member of the International Astronomical Union and the American Astronomical Society (AAS).

In 2008 - 2009, he served as the Chair of the Division on Dynamical Astronomy of the AAS.

With Sergei Kopeikin and George Kaplan, Michael Efroimsky co-authored a book on the relativistic celestial mechanics of the Solar System.

With Benoit Noyelles, Julien Frouard and Valeri V. Makarov, Michael Efroimsky co-authored a theory explaining the origin of the present state of rotation of the planet Mercury, a so-called 3:2 spin-orbit resonance.

With Amirhossein Bagheri, Amir Khan, and other colleagues, Michael Efroimsky co-authored a theory explaining the origin and orbital evolution of Phobos and Deimos, the satellites of Mars. According to this theory, Phobos and Deimos are remnants of a common progenitor, a larger protomoon destroyed by a collision with a planetesimal.

In 2024, Michael Efroimsky published a paper outlining the hypothesis to explain the unique shape of Mars. He suggested that the high triaxiality of this planet is due to a long-lost moon, which was synchronous, i.e., residing above the same point of the Martial equator. Efroimsky christened it Nerio. He demonstrated that if Nerio were large enough, perhaps a third the mass of the Moon, its gravitational pull on the young and still soft Mars was sufficient to create an asymmetric tidal bulge, which later fossilised and made the equator noncircular, resulting in the planet's triaxial shape. Efroimsky also hypothesised that the tips of that bulge were more prone to subsequent volcanic and tectonic activity than the rest of the Martian surface, leading to the development of both Tharsis and the highlands on the side opposite to it.

Michael Efroimsky also published translations from classical Russian poetry.
