= Limtoc =

Crater on the surface of Mars's moon Phobos

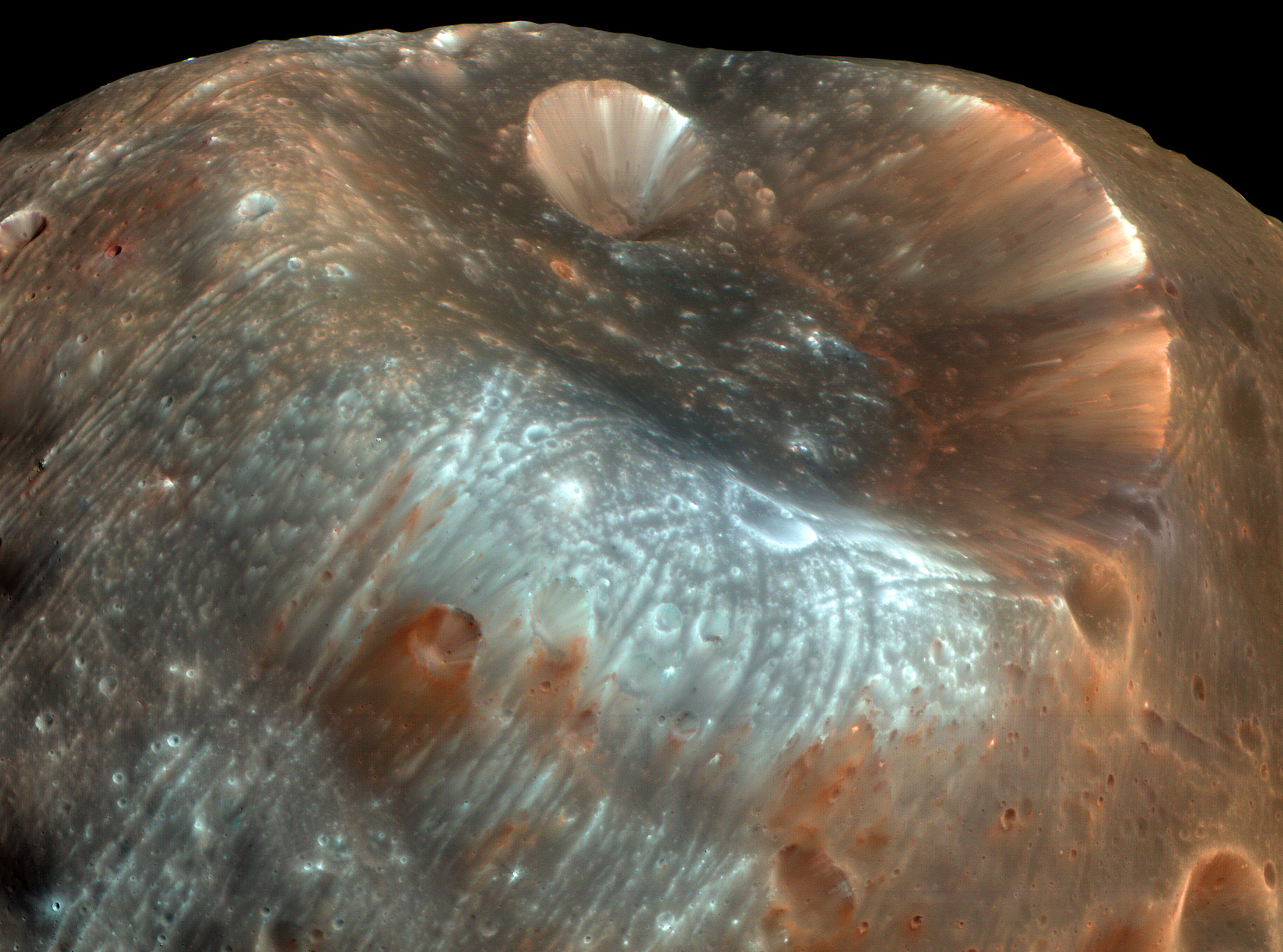
- A false-color image of Limtoc within the Stickney crater, as seen by the Mars Reconnaissance Orbiter on 23 March 2008
- Feature type: Impact crater
- Coordinates: 11.00°S 54.00°W
- Diameter: 2 km
- Eponym: Character from Gulliver's Travels

Limtoc is an impact crater on the surface of Mars's moon Phobos. The crater, the diameter of which is 2 kilometers, is located within the larger and better-known Stickney crater. Limtoc was officially named by the International Astronomical Union on 29 November 2006, after a character from Jonathan Swift's 1726 satirical novel Gulliver's Travels.

Limtoc is estimated to have formed within the last 109 million years, making it one of the youngest features on Phobos. When the Limtoc impactor collided with Phobos, it created a significant amount of ejecta which was sent towards the northern edge of Stickney, where it collided with that crater's rim. Ejecta sent towards the southern edge was largely catapulted out of Stickney. This ejecta partially contributed to the formation of the blue spectral coloration seen on the south-western edge of the Stickney crater, along with the ejecta from Stickney itself.
