= Oliver Wendell =

American astronomer (1845–1912)

Oliver Clinton Wendell
- Born: May 7, 1845; Dover, New Hampshire
- Died: November 5, 1912 (aged 67)
- Education: Doctor of Science
- Spouse: Sarah Butler (1870–1910)

Oliver Clinton Wendell (1845–1912) was an American astronomer.

After graduating from Bates College in 1868, in 1869 he served in the capacity of civil and hydraulic engineer with the Locks and Canals Corp. in Lowell, Massachusetts. The following year he was married to Sarah Butler. In 1871 he earned his master's degree. He was appointed an assistant at the Harvard College Observatory in 1879 and became assistant Professor in 1898. In 1907 he was awarded a Ph.D.

A crater on Phobos is named after him.
