= Henry George Madan =

British school teacher and chemist

Henry George Madan (6 September 1838 – 22 December 1901) was an English chemist, teacher and academic.

He was born in Cam Vicarage, Gloucestershire, England, the eldest child of George Madan. After an education at Marlborough College, he earned an open exhibition at Corpus Christi College, Oxford. He earned a B.A. in 1860, became a fellow of The Queen's College, Oxford in 1861 and was awarded an M.A. in 1864. He became the science master at Eton College, where he served for twenty years. He was elected a Fellow of the Chemical Society and published several works on chemistry and physics. In 1887, he co-published Exercises in practical chemistry with A. G. V. Harcourt, which became a standard textbook for many years thereafter.

In 1877, American astronomer Asaph Hall discovered two satellites orbiting the planet Mars. Various names were proposed, but Asaph chose the suggestion of Henry Madan, who proposed the names Deimus (later Deimos) and Phobus (later Phobos). (These names are found in the Fifteenth Book, line 119 of Homer's Iliad.) Henry was the brother of Falconer Madan (1851–1935), the librarian of the Bodleian Library of the University of Oxford. Falconer's granddaughter, Venetia Burney (1918–2009), was the first person to suggest the name Pluto for the dwarf planet, discovered in 1930.

In 1901, Henry George Madan was injured by a railway truck and needed his arm amputated. His health never recovered and he died several months later.

== Bibliography ==
- An elementary treatise on heat (1889)
- Exercises in practical chemistry (1887) with A. G. Vernon Harcourt
- Lessons in elementary dynamics (1886)
- Tables of qualitative analysis (1881)
