= Phobos (moon) =

Larger of the two moons of Mars

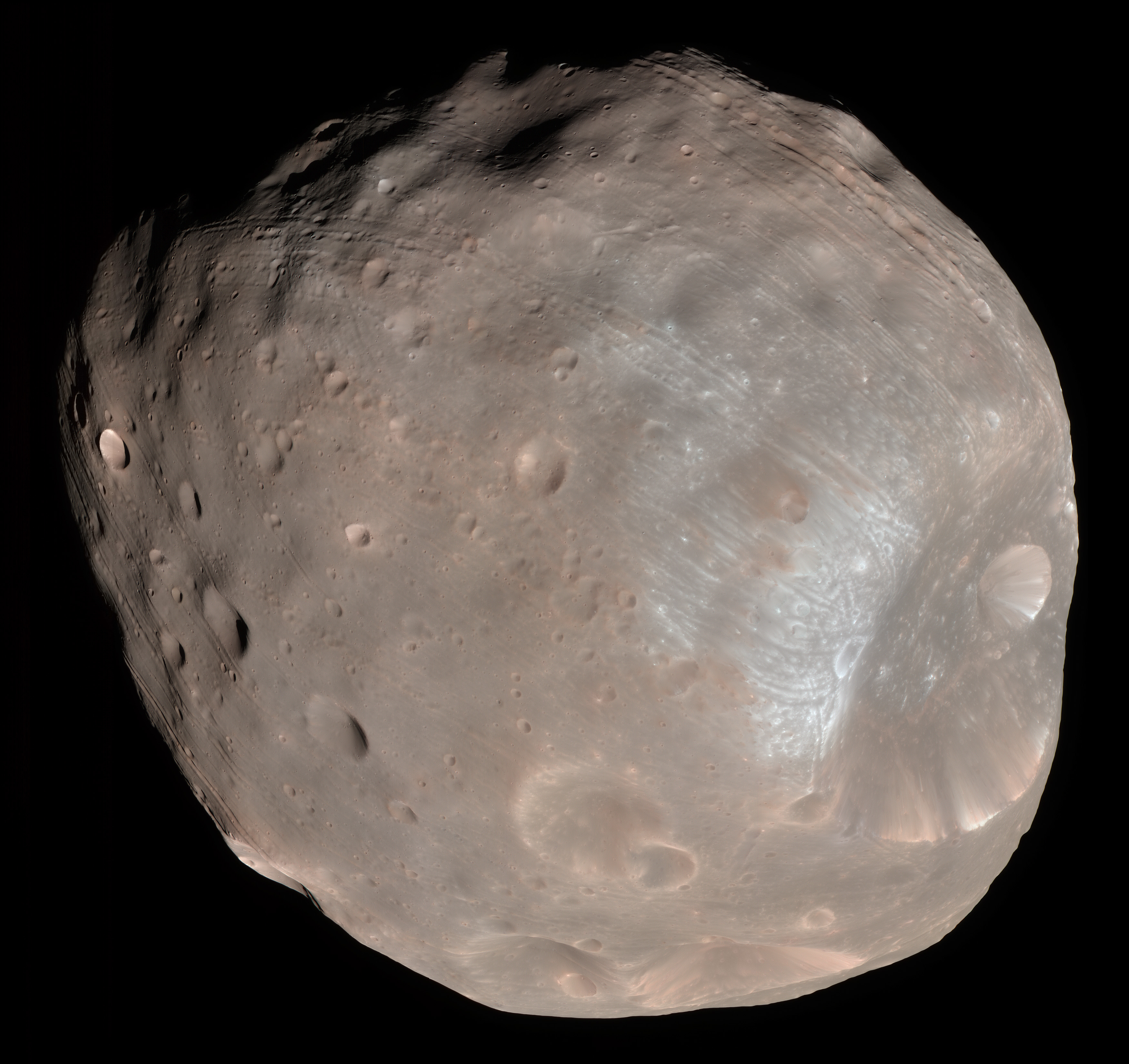
- A false-color composite image of Phobos captured by the Mars Reconnaissance Orbiter in 2008

Discovery
- Discovered by: Asaph Hall
- Discovery date: 18 August 1877

Designations
- Designation: Mars I
- Pronunciation: /ˈfoʊbɒs/ or /ˈfoʊbəs/
- Named after: Φόβος
- Adjectives: Phobian /ˈfoʊbiən/
- Symbol: (rare)

Orbital characteristics
- Epoch 2020 January 1.0 TDB
- Periapsis: 9,233.40 km
- Apoapsis: 9,516.52 km
- Semi-major axis: 9,374.96+1.32 −1.22 km (2.76 Mars radii/1.472 Earth radii)
- Eccentricity: 0.0151±0.0002
- Orbital period (sidereal): 7.6539+0.0018 −0.0016 h
- Average orbital speed: 2.138 km/s
- Inclination: 1.08°+0.01° −0.02° (to local Laplace plane); 1.093° (to Mars's equator); 26.04° (to the ecliptic)
- Satellite of: Mars

Physical characteristics
- Dimensions: 25.90 × 22.60 × 18.32 km (± 0.08 × 0.08 × 0.06 km)
- Mean radius: 11.08±0.04 km (Note: This is the radius of a sphere with equivalent volume.)
- Surface area: 1,629±8 km^{2}
- Volume: 5,740±30 km^{3}
- Mass: (1.0637±0.0001)×10^{16} kg (Note: Calculated from its standard gravitational parameter GM = (7.09962±0.00197)×10^{5} m^{3}/s^{2} (3 σ).)
- Mean density: 1.853±0.010 g/cm^{3} (calculated)
- Surface gravity: 0.0057 m/s^{2} (581.4 μ g)
- Escape velocity: 11.39 m/s (41 km/h)
- Synodic rotation period: Synchronous
- Equatorial rotation velocity: 11.0 km/h (6.8 mph) (at longest axis)
- Axial tilt: 0°
- Albedo: 0.071 ± 0.012 (geometric; at 0.54 μm); 0.021 ± 0.005 (spherical; at 0.54 μm)
Surface temp.	min	mean	max
Temperature	150 K	233 K	300 K
- Apparent magnitude: 11.8

Phobos (/ˈfoʊboʊs/) is the innermost and larger of the two natural satellites of Mars, the other being Deimos. The two moons were discovered in 1877 by American astronomer Asaph Hall. Phobos is named after the Greek god of fear and panic, who is the twin brother of Deimos and son of Ares (Mars).

Phobos is a small, irregularly shaped object with a mean radius of 11 km (7 mi). It orbits 6,000 km (3,700 mi) from the Martian surface, closer to its primary body than any other known natural satellite to a planet. It orbits Mars much faster than Mars rotates and completes an orbit in just 7 hours and 39 minutes. As a result, from the surface of Mars it appears to rise in the west, move across the sky in 4 hours and 15 minutes or less, and set in the east, twice each Martian day. Phobos is one of the least reflective bodies in the Solar System, with an albedo of 0.071. Surface temperatures range from about −4 °C (25 °F) on the sunlit side to −112 °C (−170 °F) on the shadowed side. The notable surface feature is the large impact crater Stickney, which takes up a substantial proportion of the moon's surface. The surface is also marked by many grooves, and there are numerous theories as to how these grooves were formed. An example of this is caused by tidal forces from Mars.

Images and models indicate that Phobos may be a rubble pile held together by a thin crust that is being torn apart by tidal interactions. Phobos gets closer to Mars by about 2 centimetres (0.79 in) per year.

== History of research ==
Phobos was discovered by the American astronomer Asaph Hall on 18 August 1877 at the United States Naval Observatory in Washington, D.C., at about 09:14 Greenwich Mean Time. (Contemporary sources, using the pre-1925 astronomical convention that began the day at noon, give the time of discovery as 17 August at 16:06 Washington Mean Time, meaning 18 August 04:06 in the modern convention.) Hall had discovered Deimos, Mars's other moon, a few days earlier. The discoveries were made using the world's largest refracting telescope, the 26-inch "Great Equatorial".

The names, originally spelled Phobus and Deimus respectively, were suggested by the British academic Henry Madan, a science master at Eton College, who based them on Greek mythology, in which Phobos is a companion to the god, Ares.

Planetary moons other than Earth's were never given symbols in the astronomical literature. Denis Moskowitz, a software engineer who designed most of the dwarf planet symbols, proposed a Greek phi (the initial of Phobos) combined with Mars's spear as the symbol of Phobos. This symbol is not widely used.

=== Shklovsky's "Hollow Phobos" hypothesis ===
In the late 1950s and 1960s, the unusual orbital characteristics of Phobos led to speculations that it might be hollow. Around 1958, Russian astrophysicist Iosif Samuilovich Shklovsky, studying the secular acceleration of Phobos's orbital motion, suggested a "thin sheet metal" structure for Phobos, a suggestion which led to speculations that Phobos was of artificial origin. Shklovsky based his analysis on estimates of the upper Martian atmosphere's density and deduced that for the weak braking effect to be able to account for the secular acceleration, Phobos had to be very light—one calculation yielded a hollow iron sphere 16 km (9.9 mi) across but less than 6 cm (2.4 in) thick. In a February 1960 letter to the journal Astronautics, Fred Singer, then science advisor to U.S. President Dwight D. Eisenhower, said of Shklovsky's theory:

If the satellite is indeed spiraling inward as deduced from astronomical observation, then there is little alternative to the hypothesis that it is hollow and therefore Martian made. The big "if" lies in the astronomical observations; they may well be in error. Since they are based on several independent sets of measurements taken decades apart by different observers with different instruments, systematic errors may have influenced them.

Subsequently, the systematic data errors that Singer predicted were found to exist, the claim was called into doubt, and accurate measurements of the orbit available by 1969 showed that the discrepancy did not exist. Singer's critique was justified when earlier studies were discovered to have used an overestimated value of 5 cm (2.0 in) per year for the rate of altitude loss, which was later revised to 1.8 cm (0.71 in) per year. The secular acceleration is now attributed to tidal effects, which create drag on the moon and therefore cause it to spiral inward.

The density of Phobos has now been directly measured by spacecraft to be 1.887 g/cm^{3} (0.0682 lb/cu in). Current observations are consistent with Phobos being a rubble pile. Images obtained by the Viking probes in the 1970s showed a natural object, not an artificial one. Nevertheless, mapping by the Mars Express probe and subsequent volume calculations do suggest the presence of voids and indicate that it is not a solid chunk of rock but a porous body. The porosity of Phobos was calculated to be 30% ± 5%, or a quarter to a third being empty.

== Physical characteristics ==
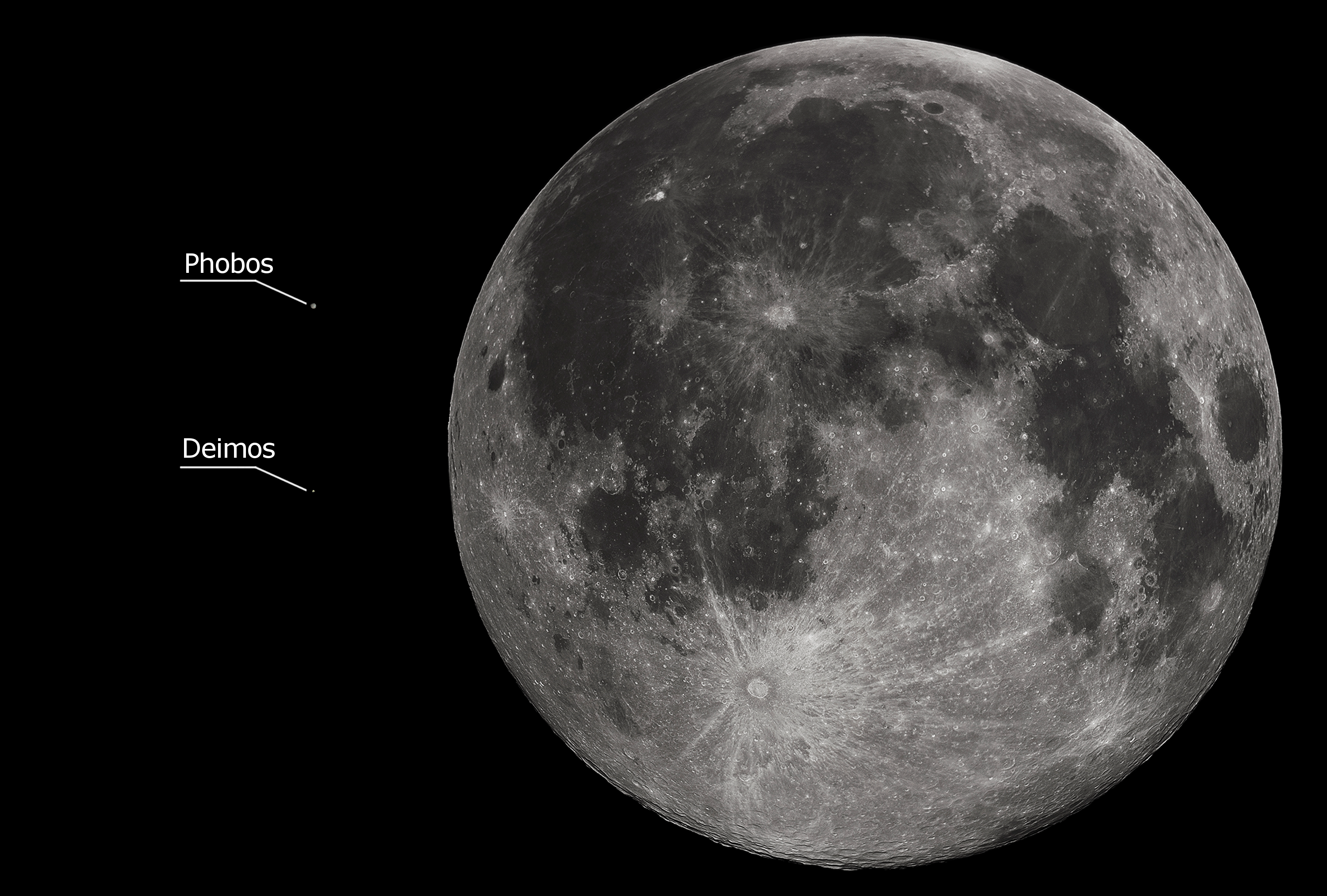
Size comparison between Phobos, Deimos and the Moon (right)

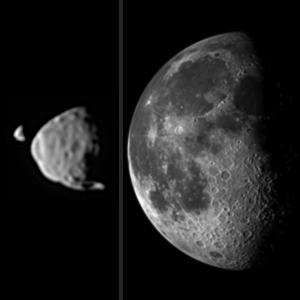
Deimos and Phobos as seen from Mars, compared in apparent size to the Moon as seen from Earth

Phobos has dimensions of 26 by 23 by 18 kilometres (16 mi × 14 mi × 11 mi), and retains too little mass to be rounded under its own gravity. Phobos does not have an atmosphere due to its low mass and low gravity. It is one of the least reflective bodies in the Solar System, with an albedo of about 0.071. Infrared spectra show that it has carbon-rich material such as that found in carbonaceous chondrites, and its composition shows similarities to that of Mars's surface. Phobos's density is too low to be solid rock, and it is known to have significant porosity. These results led to the suggestion that Phobos might contain a substantial reservoir of ice. Spectral observations indicate that the surface regolith layer lacks hydration, but ice below the regolith is not ruled out. Surface temperatures range from about −4 °C (25 °F) on the sunlit side to −112 °C (−170 °F) on the shadowed side.

Unlike Deimos, Phobos is heavily cratered, with one of the craters near the equator having a central peak despite the moon's small size. The most prominent of these is the crater Stickney, an impact crater 9 km (5.6 mi) in diameter, which takes up a substantial proportion of the moon's surface area. As with the Saturnian moon Mimas's crater Herschel, the impact that created Stickney probably almost shattered Phobos.

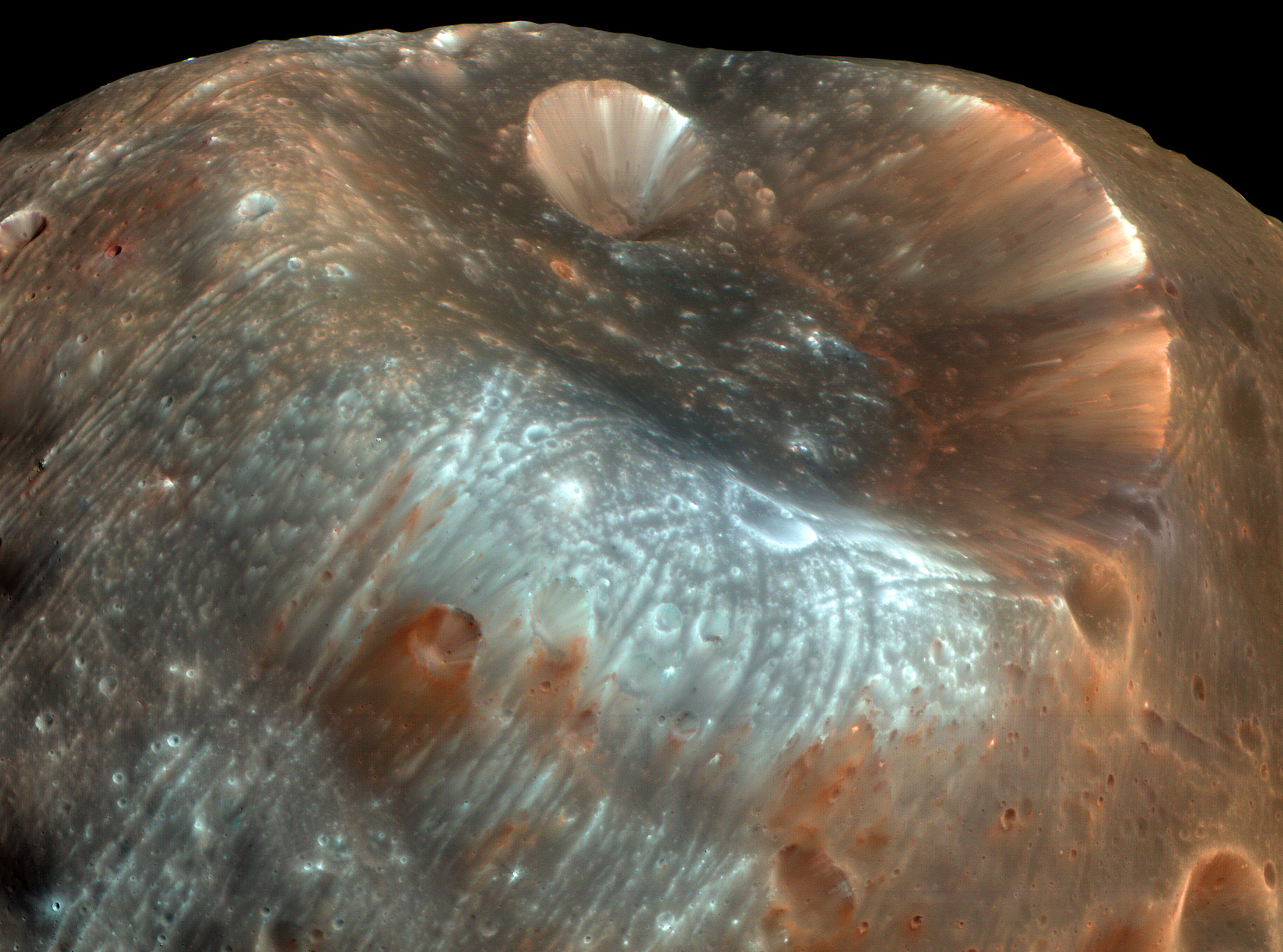
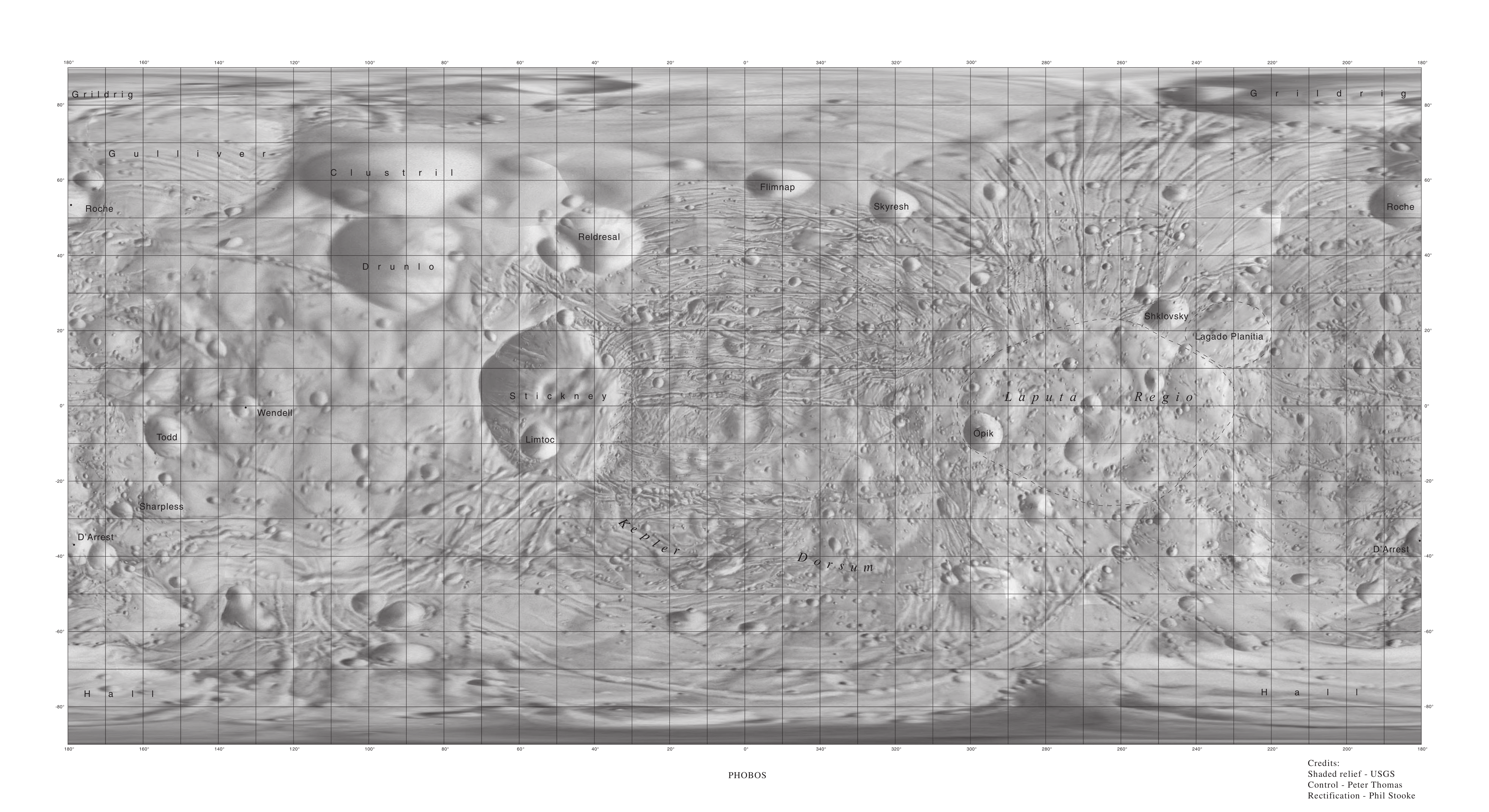
(top) False colour image of the impact crater Stickney imaged by the Mars Reconnaissance Orbiter in March 2008; (bottom) Labeled Map of Phobos – Moon of Mars (U.S. Geological Survey)

Many grooves and streaks cover the oddly shaped surface. The grooves are typically less than 30 metres (98 ft) deep, 100 to 200 metres (330 to 660 ft) wide, and up to 20 kilometres (12 mi) in length, and were originally assumed to have been the result of the same impact that created Stickney. Analysis of results from the Mars Express spacecraft revealed that the grooves are not radial to Stickney, but are centered on the leading apex of Phobos in its orbit (which is not far from Stickney). Researchers suspected that they had been excavated by material ejected into space by impacts on the surface of Mars. The grooves thus formed as crater chains, and all of them fade away as the trailing apex of Phobos is approached. They have been grouped into 12 or more families of varying age, presumably representing at least 12 Martian impact events. In November 2018, based on computational probability analysis, astronomers concluded that the many grooves on Phobos were caused by boulders ejected from the asteroid impact that created Stickney crater. These boulders rolled in a predictable pattern on the surface of the moon.

Faint dust rings produced by Phobos and Deimos have long been predicted but attempts to observe these rings have, to date, failed. Images from Mars Global Surveyor indicate that Phobos is covered with a layer of fine-grained regolith at least 100 metres thick; it is hypothesised to have been created by impacts from other bodies, but it is not known how the material stuck to an object with almost no gravity.

The unique Kaidun meteorite that fell on a Soviet military base in Yemen in 1980 has been hypothesised to be a piece of Phobos, but this could not be verified because little is known about the exact composition of Phobos.

== Named features ==
Geological features on Phobos are named after astronomers who studied Phobos and people and places from Jonathan Swift's Gulliver's Travels. Some craters have been named, and are listed in the following map and table.

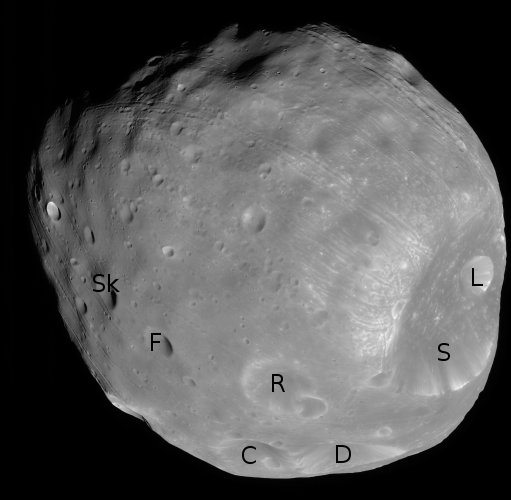
Phobos Crater Names (view • discuss)

Named craters on Phobos
Crater	Coordinates	Diameter (km)	Approval Year	Eponym	Ref
Clustril	60°N 91°W	3.4	2006	Character in Lilliput who informed Flimnap that his wife had visited Gulliver privately in Jonathan Swift's novel Gulliver's Travels	WGPSN
D'Arrest	39°S 179°W	2.1	1973	Heinrich Louis d'Arrest; German/Danish astronomer (1822–1875)	WGPSN
Drunlo	36.5°N 92°W	4.2	2006	Character in Lilliput who informed Flimnap that his wife had visited Gulliver privately in Gulliver's Travels	WGPSN
Flimnap	60°N 10°E	1.5	2006	Treasurer of Lilliput in Gulliver's Travels	WGPSN
Grildrig	81°N 165°E	2.6	2006	Name given to Gulliver by the farmer's daughter Glumdalclitch in the giants' country Brobdingnag in Gulliver's Travels	WGPSN
Gulliver	62°N 163°W	5.5	2006	Lemuel Gulliver; surgeon captain and voyager in Gulliver's Travels	WGPSN
Hall	80°S 150°E	5.4	1973	Asaph Hall; American astronomer discoverer of Phobos and Deimos (1829–1907)	WGPSN
Limtoc	11°S 54°W	2	2006	General in Lilliput who prepared articles of impeachment against Gulliver in Gulliver's Travels	WGPSN
Öpik	7°S 63°E	2	2011	Ernst J. Öpik, Estonian astronomer (1893–1985)	WGPSN
Reldresal	41°N 39°W	2.9	2006	Secretary for Private Affairs in Lilliput; Gulliver's friend in Gulliver's Travels	WGPSN
Roche	53°N 177°E	2.3	1973	Édouard Roche; French astronomer (1820–1883)	WGPSN
Sharpless	27.5°S 154°W	1.8	1973	Bevan Sharpless; American astronomer (1904–1950)	WGPSN
Shklovsky	24°N 112°E	2	2011	Iosif Shklovsky, Soviet astronomer (1916–1985)	WGPSN
Skyresh	52.5°N 40°E	1.5	2006	Skyresh Bolgolam; High Admiral of the Lilliput council who opposed Gulliver's plea for freedom and accused him of being a traitor in Gulliver's Travels	WGPSN
Stickney	1°N 49°W	9	1973	Angeline Stickney (1830–1892); wife of American astronomer Asaph Hall (see Hall crater)	WGPSN
Todd	9°S 153°W	2.6	1973	David Peck Todd; American astronomer (1855–1939)	WGPSN
Wendell	1°S 132°W	1.7	1973	Oliver Wendell; American astronomer (1845–1912)	WGPSN

There is one named regio, Laputa Regio, and one named planitia, Lagado Planitia; both are named after places in Gulliver's Travels (the fictional Laputa, a flying island, and Lagado, imaginary capital of the fictional nation Balnibarbi). The only named ridge on Phobos is Kepler Dorsum, named after the astronomer Johannes Kepler.

== Orbital characteristics ==
Orbits of Phobos and Deimos

The orbital motion of Phobos has been intensively studied, making it "the best studied natural satellite in the Solar System" in terms of orbits completed. Its close orbit around Mars produces some distinct effects. With an altitude of 5,989 km (3,721 mi), Phobos orbits Mars below the synchronous orbit radius, meaning that it moves around Mars faster than Mars itself rotates. Therefore, from the point of view of an observer on the surface of Mars, it rises in the west, moves comparatively rapidly across the sky (in 4 h 15 min or less) and sets in the east, approximately twice each Martian day (every 11 h 6 min). Because it is close to the surface and in an equatorial orbit, it cannot be seen above the horizon from latitudes greater than 70.4°. Its orbit is so low that its angular diameter, as seen by an observer on Mars, varies visibly with its position in the sky. Seen at the horizon, Phobos is about 0.14° wide; at zenith, it is 0.20°, one-third as wide as the full Moon as seen from Earth. By comparison, the Sun has an apparent size of about 0.35° in the Martian sky. Phobos's phases, inasmuch as they can be observed from Mars, take 0.3191 days (Phobos's synodic period) to run their course, a mere 13 seconds longer than Phobos's sidereal period.

=== Solar transits ===
Phobos transits the Sun, as viewed by the Perseverance rover on 2 April 2022

An observer situated on the Martian surface, in a position to observe Phobos, would see regular transits of Phobos across the Sun. Several of these transits have been photographed by the Mars Rover Opportunity. During the transits, Phobos casts a shadow on the surface of Mars; this event has been photographed by several spacecraft. Phobos is not large enough to cover the Sun's disk, and so cannot cause a total eclipse.

=== Predicted destruction ===
Tidal deceleration is gradually decreasing the orbital radius of Phobos by approximately 2 m (6 ft 7 in) every 100 years, and with decreasing orbital radius the likelihood of breakup due to tidal forces increases, estimated in approximately 30–50 million years, or about 43 million years in one study's estimate.

Given Phobos's irregular shape and assuming that it is a pile of rubble (specifically a Mohr–Coulomb body), it will eventually break up due to tidal forces when it reaches approximately 2.1 Mars radii. When Phobos is broken up, it will form a planetary ring around Mars. This predicted ring may last from 1 million to 100 million years. The fraction of the mass of Phobos that will form the ring depends on the unknown internal structure of Phobos. Loose, weakly bound material will form the ring. Components of Phobos with strong cohesion will escape tidal breakup and will enter the Martian atmosphere.

== Origin ==
An illustration of main-belt asteroid capture hypothesis

The origin of the Martian moons has been disputed. Phobos and Deimos both have much in common with carbonaceous C-type asteroids, with spectra, albedo, and density very similar to those of C- or D-type asteroids. Based on their similarity, one hypothesis is that both moons may be captured main-belt asteroids. Since both moons have nearly circular orbits that lie almost exactly in Mars's equatorial plane, a capture origin for them requires a mechanism for circularising their initially highly eccentric orbits and adjusting their inclinations into the equatorial plane, most probably by a combination of atmospheric drag and tidal forces. However, it is not clear that sufficient time is available for this to occur for Deimos. Capture also requires dissipation of energy. The current Martian atmosphere is too thin to capture a Phobos-sized object by atmospheric braking. Geoffrey A. Landis has pointed out that the capture could have occurred if the original body was a binary asteroid that separated under tidal forces.

Phobos could be a second-generation Solar System object that coalesced in orbit after Mars formed, rather than forming concurrently out of the same birth cloud as Mars.

Another hypothesis is that Mars was once surrounded by many Phobos- and Deimos-sized bodies, perhaps ejected into orbit around it by a collision with a large planetesimal. The high porosity of the interior of Phobos (based on the density of 1.88 g/cm^{3}, voids are estimated to comprise 25 to 35 percent of Phobos's volume) is inconsistent with an asteroidal origin. Observations of Phobos in the thermal infrared suggest a composition containing mainly phyllosilicates, which are well known from the surface of Mars. The spectra are distinct from those of all classes of chondrite meteorites, again pointing away from an asteroidal origin. Both sets of findings support an origin of Phobos from material ejected by an impact on Mars that reaccreted in Martian orbit, similar to the prevailing theory for the origin of Earth's moon.

Some areas of the surface are reddish in colour, while others are bluish. The hypothesis is that gravity pull from Mars makes the reddish regolith move over the surface, exposing relatively fresh, unweathered and bluish material from the moon, while the regolith covering it over time has been weathered due to exposure of solar radiation. Because the blue rock differs from known Martian rock, it could contradict the theory that the moon is formed from leftover planetary material after the impact of a large object.

In February 2021, Amirhossein Bagheri (ETH Zurich), Amir Khan (ETH Zurich), Michael Efroimsky (U.S. Naval Observatory) and their colleagues proposed a new hypothesis on the origin of the moons. By analyzing the seismic and orbital data from Mars InSight Mission and other missions, they proposed that the moons are born from disruption of a common parent body around 1 to 2.7 billion years ago. The common progenitor of Phobos and Deimos was most probably hit by another object and shattered to form both moons.

== Exploration ==
=== Launched missions ===
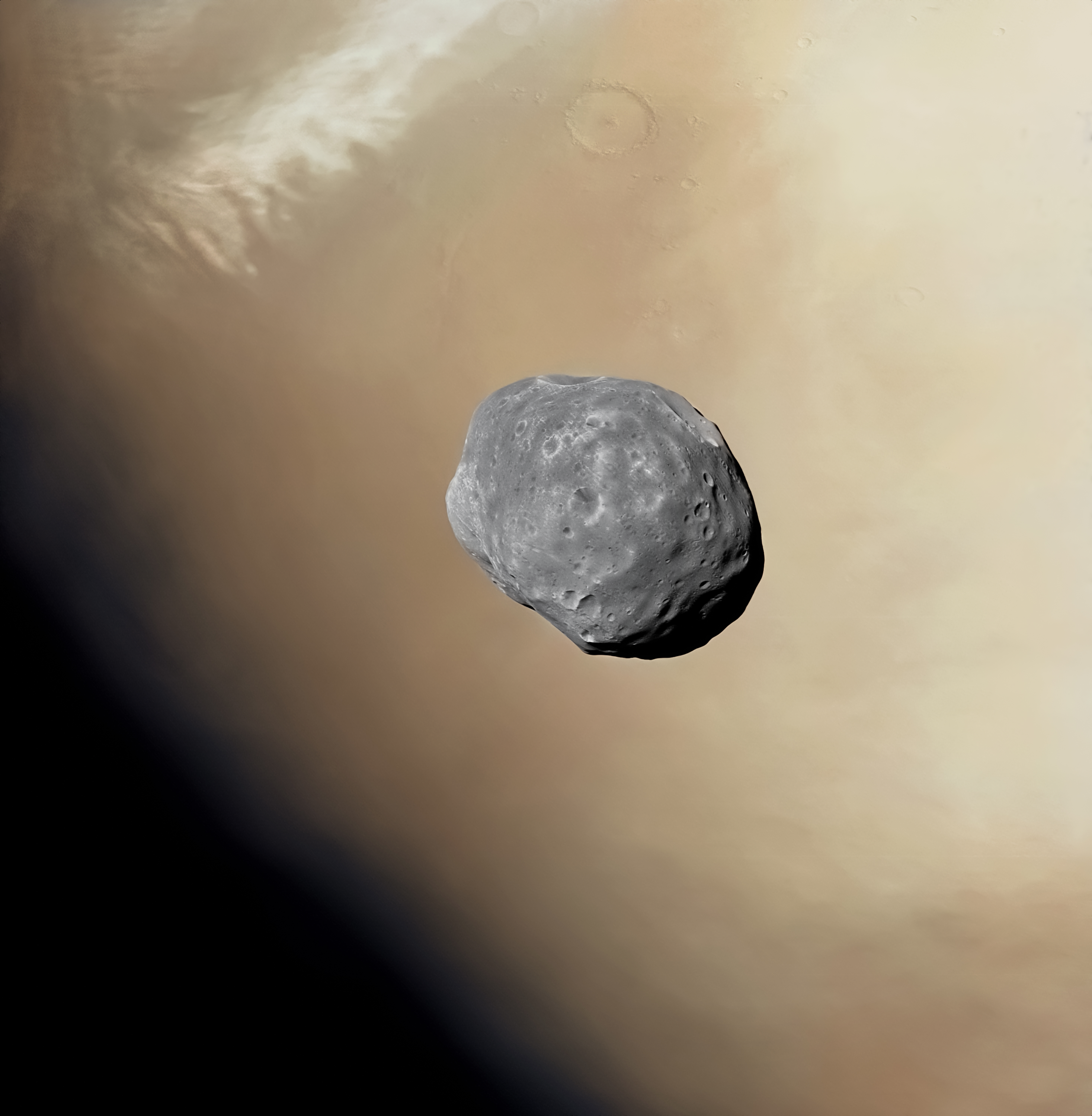
Phobos over Mars (ESA Mars Express)

Phobos has been photographed in close-up by several spacecraft whose primary mission has been to photograph Mars. The first was Mariner 7 in 1969, followed by Mariner 9 in 1971, Viking 1 in 1977, Phobos 2 in 1989 Mars Global Surveyor in 1998 and 2003, Mars Express in 2004, 2008, 2010 and 2019, and Mars Reconnaissance Orbiter in 2007 and 2008. On 25 August 2005, the Spirit rover, with an excess of energy due to wind blowing dust off of its solar panels, took several short-exposure photographs of the night sky from the surface of Mars, and was able to photograph both Phobos and Deimos.

The Soviet Union undertook the Phobos program with two probes, both launched successfully in July 1988. Phobos 1 was shut down by an erroneous command from ground control issued in September 1988 and lost while still en route. Phobos 2 arrived at the Mars system in January 1989 and, after transmitting a small amount of data and imagery shortly before beginning its detailed examination of Phobos's surface, abruptly ceased transmission due either to failure of the onboard computer or of the radio transmitter, already operating on backup power. Other Mars missions collected more data, but no dedicated sample return mission has been successfully performed.

The Russian Space Agency launched a sample return mission to Phobos in November 2011, called Fobos-Grunt. The return capsule also included a life science experiment of The Planetary Society, called Living Interplanetary Flight Experiment, or LIFE. A second contributor to this mission was the China National Space Administration, which supplied a surveying satellite called "Yinghuo-1", which would have been released in the orbit of Mars, and a soil-grinding and sieving system for the scientific payload of the Phobos lander. After achieving Earth orbit, the Fobos-Grunt probe failed to initiate subsequent burns that would have sent it to Mars. Attempts to recover the probe were unsuccessful and it crashed back to Earth in January 2012.

On 1 July 2020, the Mars orbiter of the Indian Space Research Organisation was able to capture photos of the body from 4,200 km away.

During the end of its 12 March 2025 gravity assist from Mars, en route to 65803 Didymos, the ESA's Hera was able to observe Phobos retreating from the planet in its orbit at distances less than 13,000 km away.

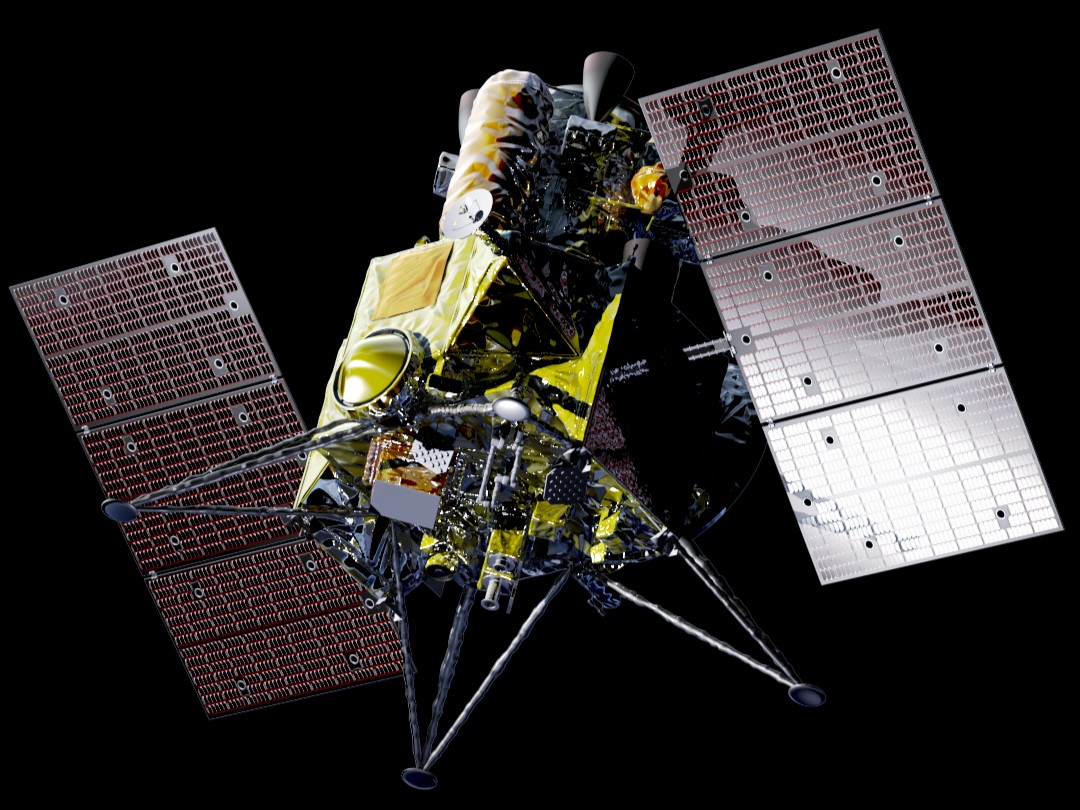
An artist's concept of Martian Moons eXploration spacecraft

The Japanese Aerospace Exploration Agency (JAXA) unveiled on 9 June 2015 the Martian Moons eXploration (MMX), a sample return mission targeting Phobos. MMX will land and collect samples from Phobos multiple times, along with conducting Deimos flyby observations and monitoring Mars's climate. By using a corer sampling mechanism, the spacecraft aims to retrieve a minimum 10 g amount of samples. NASA, DLR, and CNES are also participating in the project, and will provide scientific instruments and a rover for the mission, named Idefix. MMX was launched on 19 October 2026, and will return samples from Phobos to Earth in 2031.

=== Proposed and undeveloped missions ===
In 1997 and 1998, the Aladdin mission was selected as a finalist in the NASA Discovery Program. The plan was to visit both Phobos and Deimos, and launch projectiles at the satellites. The probe would collect the ejecta as it performed a slow flyby (~1 km/s). These samples would be returned to Earth for study three years later. The Principal Investigator was Dr. Carle Pieters of Brown University. The total mission cost, including launch vehicle and operations was $247.7 million. Ultimately, the mission chosen to fly was MESSENGER, a probe to Mercury.

In 2007, the European aerospace subsidiary EADS Astrium was reported to have been developing a mission to Phobos as a technology demonstrator. Astrium was involved in developing a European Space Agency plan for a sample return mission to Mars, as part of the ESA's Aurora programme, and sending a mission to Phobos with its low gravity was seen as a good opportunity for testing and proving the technologies required for an eventual sample return mission to Mars. The mission was envisioned to start in 2016, was to last for three years. The company planned to use a "mothership", which would be propelled by an ion engine, releasing a lander to the surface of Phobos. The lander would perform some tests and experiments, gather samples in a capsule, then return to the mothership and head back to Earth where the samples would be jettisoned for recovery on the surface.

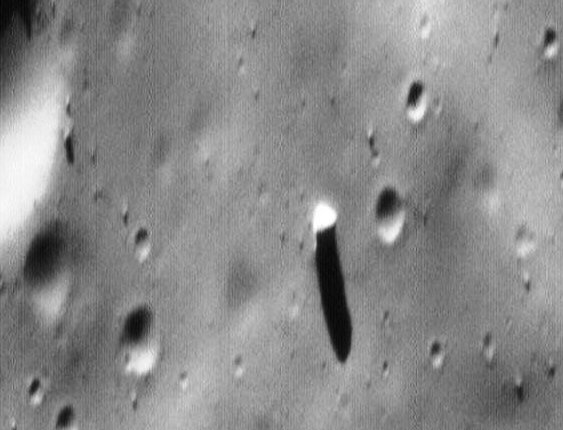
The Phobos monolith (right of center) as taken by the Mars Global Surveyor (MOC Image 55103, 1998)

In 2007, the Canadian Space Agency funded a study by Optech and the Mars Institute for an uncrewed mission to Phobos known as Phobos Reconnaissance and International Mars Exploration (PRIME). A proposed landing site for the PRIME spacecraft is at the "Phobos monolith", a prominent object near Stickney crater. The PRIME mission would be composed of an orbiter and lander, and each would carry four instruments designed to study various aspects of Phobos's geology.

In 2008, NASA Glenn Research Center began studying a Phobos and Deimos sample return mission that would use solar electric propulsion. The study gave rise to the "Hall" mission concept, a New Frontiers-class mission under further study as of 2010.

Another concept of a sample return mission from Phobos and Deimos is OSIRIS-REx II, which would use heritage technology from the first OSIRIS-REx mission.

In 2013, Phobos Surveyor mission was proposed by Stanford University, NASA's Jet Propulsion Laboratory, and the Massachusetts Institute of Technology.

In 2014, a Discovery-class mission was proposed to place an orbiter in Mars orbit by 2021 to study Phobos and Deimos through a series of close flybys. The mission is called Phobos And Deimos & Mars Environment (PADME). Two other Phobos missions that were proposed for the Discovery 13 selection included a Merlin, which would flyby Deimos but actually orbit and land on Phobos, and Pandora which would orbit both Deimos and Phobos.

Russia plans to repeat Fobos-Grunt mission in the late 2020s, and the European Space Agency is assessing a sample-return mission for 2024 called Phootprint.

=== Human missions ===
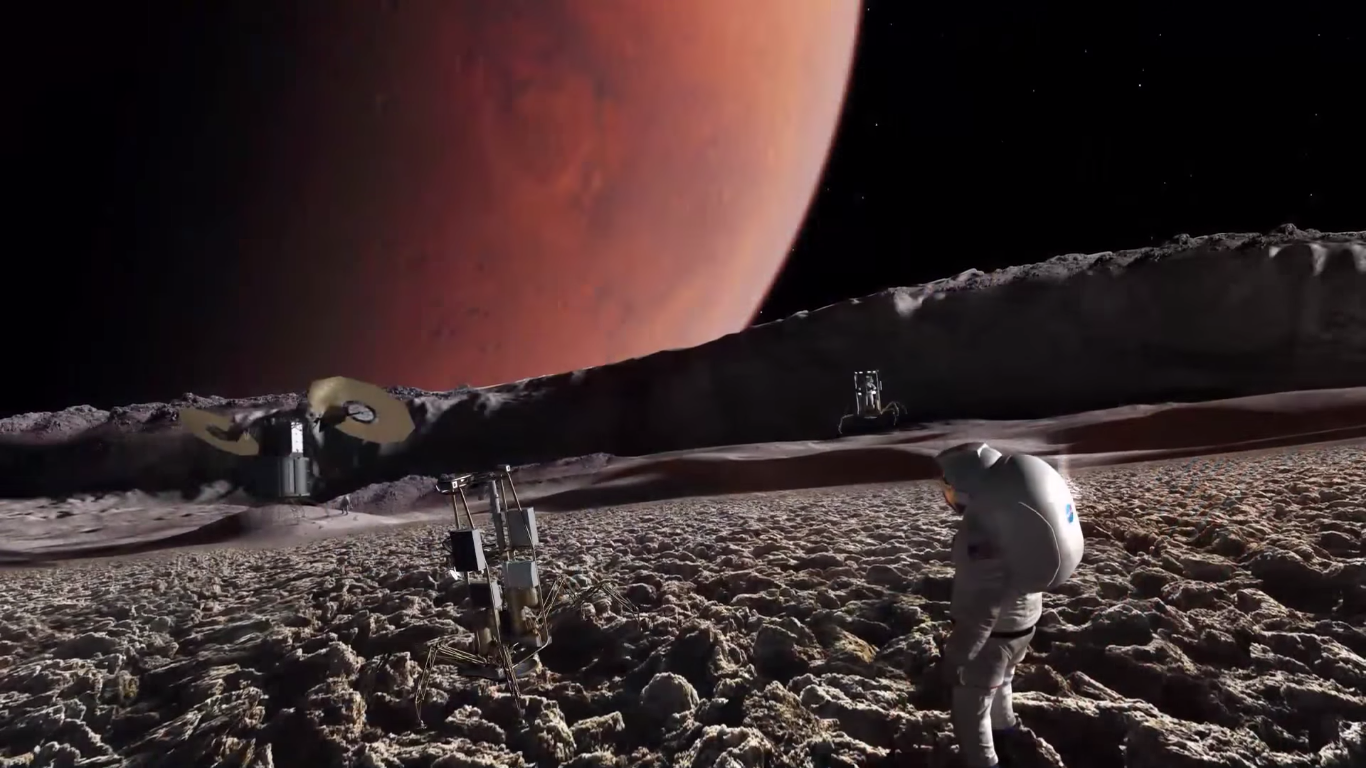
NASA concept of a human mission to Phobos

Phobos has been proposed as an early target for a human mission to Mars. The teleoperation of robotic scouts on Mars by humans on Phobos could be conducted without significant time delay, and planetary protection concerns in early Mars exploration might be addressed by such an approach.

A landing on Phobos would be considerably less difficult and expensive than a landing on the surface of Mars itself. A lander bound for Mars would need to be capable of atmospheric entry and subsequent return to orbit without any support facilities, or would require the creation of support facilities in situ. A lander instead bound for Phobos could be based on equipment designed for lunar and asteroid landings. Furthermore, due to Phobos's very weak gravity, the delta-v required to land on Phobos and return is only 80% of that required for a trip to and from the surface of the Moon.

It has been proposed that the sands of Phobos could serve as a valuable material for aerobraking during a Mars landing. A relatively small amount of chemical fuel brought from Earth could be used to lift a large amount of sand from the surface of Phobos to a transfer orbit. This sand could be released in front of a spacecraft during the descent manoeuvre causing a densification of the atmosphere just in front of the spacecraft.

While human exploration of Phobos could serve as a catalyst for the human exploration of Mars, it could be scientifically valuable in its own right.

=== Space elevator base ===
First discussed in fiction in 1956 by Fontenay, Phobos has been proposed as a future site for space elevator construction. This would involve a pair of space elevators: one extending 6,000 km from the Mars-facing side to the edge of Mars's atmosphere, the other extending 6,000 km (3,700 mi) from the other side and away from Mars. A spacecraft launching from Mars's surface to the lower space elevator would only need a delta-v of 0.52 km/s (0.32 mi/s), as opposed to the over 3.6 km/s (2.2 mi/s) needed to launch to low Mars orbit. The spacecraft could be lifted up using electrical power and then released from the upper space elevator with a hyperbolic velocity of 2.6 km/s (1.6 mi/s), enough to reach Earth and a significant fraction of the velocity needed to reach the asteroid belt. The space elevators could also work in reverse to help spacecraft enter the Martian system. The great mass of Phobos means that any forces from space elevator operation would have minimal effect on its orbit. Additionally, materials from Phobos could be used for space industry.

== See also ==
- List of natural satellites
- List of missions to the moons of Mars
- Phobos monolith
- Transit of Phobos from Mars
