= Astronomical day =

Length of day from Noon, not midnight

An astronomical day refers to a length of day of exactly or nearly 24 hours beginning at noon instead of at midnight. The exact length has been variously defined as either that of a solar day or of a sidereal day.

Astronomical days were historically used by astronomers (in contrast most commonly to solar days), but since the Industrial Revolution this usage has generally fallen out of favor, in order to avoid confusion with more conventional timekeeping. An astronomical day can also refer to one rotation of Earth or any other planet depending on its spin speed.
