= Washington Mean Time =

Time at the meridian through center of old dome US Naval Observatory, Washington, D.C

Washington Mean Time was the time at the meridian through the center of the old dome atop the main building at the old US Naval Observatory at Washington, D.C. This Washington meridian was defined on 28 September 1850 by the United States Congress. The Old Naval Observatory is now on the grounds of the United States Navy Bureau of Medicine and Surgery, southwest of the corner of E and 23rd Streets in Foggy Bottom (north of the Lincoln Memorial). Washington Mean Time was sometimes called Washington Meridian Time. It was never used as the basis of any time zone, although it was the local mean time of the city of Washington before the advent of American time zones on 18 November 1883. It was also used to time astronomical events by users of the American Ephemeris and Nautical Almanac, first published for the year 1855.

In 1897, well after the Old Naval Observatory closed in 1892, the Coast and Geodetic Survey reported that its meridian was 77°3′2.3″ west of Greenwich, which was quoted for the next 50 years in the list of observatories in the Almanac as GMT − 5^{h}8^{m}12.15^{s}. This old Washington meridian was repealed on 22 August 1912. A later version of Washington mean time based on the meridian of the clock room at the exact center of the New Naval Observatory (77°4′2.24″W or GMT − 5^{h}8^{m}16.15^{s}) was still being used in 1950 on a few pages of the American Ephemeris and Nautical Almanac, even though most of its pages used Greenwich Civil Time, the American name for the midnight epoch Greenwich Mean Time. For astronomical purposes, before 1925 a day was considered to start at noon rather than the previous midnight. Thus to convert times of astronomical events before 1925 given in Washington mean time to modern Universal Time it is necessary to add an additional 12 hours beyond the meridian difference from Washington to Greenwich, totalling more than 17 hours.
