= Alexander Memorial Baptist Church =

- Alexander Memorial Baptist Church
- 38.743314°N 76.818644°W
- Location: 10675 Crain Highway; Upper Marlboro, Maryland
- Country: United States
- Denomination: Progressive National Baptist Convention
- Website: www.alexandermemorial.org

History
- Founded: July 26, 1908
- Founder: W. Bishop Carroll

Clergy
- Pastor: Jesse W. Plater

Alexander Memorial Baptist Church is a Baptist congregation located at 10675 Crain Highway in Upper Marlboro, Maryland, US. The congregation was founded in 1908 after a group of members left First Baptist Church in the Georgetown neighborhood of Washington, D.C. It was named in honor of the founder of First Baptist Church, Reverend Sandy Alexander, who was a formerly enslaved person. For over 100 years, the congregation met in a building located on N Street NW in an area of Georgetown called Herring Hill, which was a 15-block enclave for around 1,000 African Americans families. Alexander Memorial Baptist Church was one of five black churches established in the area.

The congregation purchased a lot, including the former home of astronomer Asaph Hall, and built a sanctuary adjoining the residence. The cornerstone was laid in 1909. The neighborhood's demographics began changing dramatically in the 1930s due to gentrification and discriminatory legislation targeting African Americans. By the 1980s, half of the congregation's active members no longer lived in Georgetown. In 2013 the pastor and congregation chose to sell the property and relocate to suburban Maryland, where many members lived. They have met in their current church building in Upper Marlboro since 2016.

The former sanctuary and Hall's former house in Georgetown were sold for around $7.5 million and converted into luxury residences by a real estate developer. The sanctuary was converted into three condominiums listed at approximately $2–2.5 million each. The adjoining building was converted into a 5,250 square feet (488 m^{2}) residence with a listing price of almost $6.8 million.

== History ==
=== Founding ===
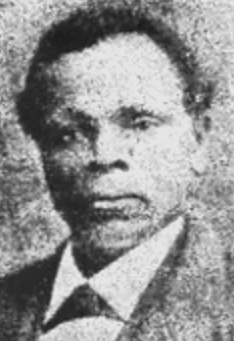
Reverend Sandy Alexander, the namesake of Alexander Memorial Baptist Church

During the 1800s the far eastern section of Georgetown developed into an enclave for African Americans, although freedmen and slaves had lived throughout the area of what was then the City of Georgetown. The 15-block enclave was known as Herring Hill, an area roughly bounded by P Street NW on the north, 29th Street NW on the west, M Street NW on the south, and Rock Creek Park on the east. The origin of the Herring Hill name was the fish once caught in Rock Creek that was a food supply for African American residents, who would eventually number around 1,000 families.

In addition to homes and businesses primarily owned by African Americans, there were also black churches established in Herring Hill. These included Mount Zion United Methodist Church, founded in 1814; First Baptist Church, founded in 1862; Jerusalem Baptist Church, founded in 1870; and Epiphany Catholic Church, founded in 1923. Alexander Memorial Baptist Church was founded on July 26, 1908, by 84 members of First Baptist Church who left the latter due to their disapproval of a new pastor. The church was named after the founder of First Baptist Church, Reverend Sandy Alexander, a formerly enslaved person.

The new congregation was organized by Reverend W. Bishop Carroll, pastor of Second Baptist Church, with assistance from Reverend W.B. Gibbons of Mount Carmel Baptist Church and Reverend Sheldon Miller of First Baptist Church of Brightwood. The congregation first met in the home of Mary Lee at 1002 26th Street NW and then moved to the Odd Fellows Hall at 28th Street and Dumbarton Street NW.

=== Church building ===
In November 1908, the Alexander Memorial Baptist Church congregation purchased Lots 40-43 in Square 1236, which included a three-story house at 2715 N Street NW, previously known as 18 Gay Street before the streets were renamed in 1895. The house had been built in 1810 and was the previous residence of astronomer Asaph Hall's family, including his wife Angeline Stickney, and their sons Asaph Hall Jr. and Percival Hall. The congregation intended on converting the house into a church building, but by May 1909 plans were made to build a new structure adjoining the house. The initial design was for a one-story building that would cost $15,000.

The ground was broken for the new building on August 19, 1909. A large crowd attended a brief ceremony for the occasion with remarks made by Carroll, Reverend W.B. Johnson of Second Baptist Church, Reverend George W. Lee of Vermont Avenue Baptist Church, Reverend F.W. Graham of Mount Olive Baptist Church, and Reverend George Jacobs of Mount Zion United Methodist Church.

The cornerstone ceremony took place soon after on October 31. After the church choir sang an opening hymn, Isaac Clarke from Howard University read verses from the Bible, and Reverend J.T. Smith of Mount Zion Baptist Church prayed. Speeches were then made by several people, including President of the Board of Commissioners Henry Brown Floyd MacFarland and Howard University President Wilbur P. Thirkield. The Grand Lodge of the Knights of Jerusalem, marching with a band from their Masonic temple on 11th Street NW to the church site, laid the cornerstone.

=== Later history ===
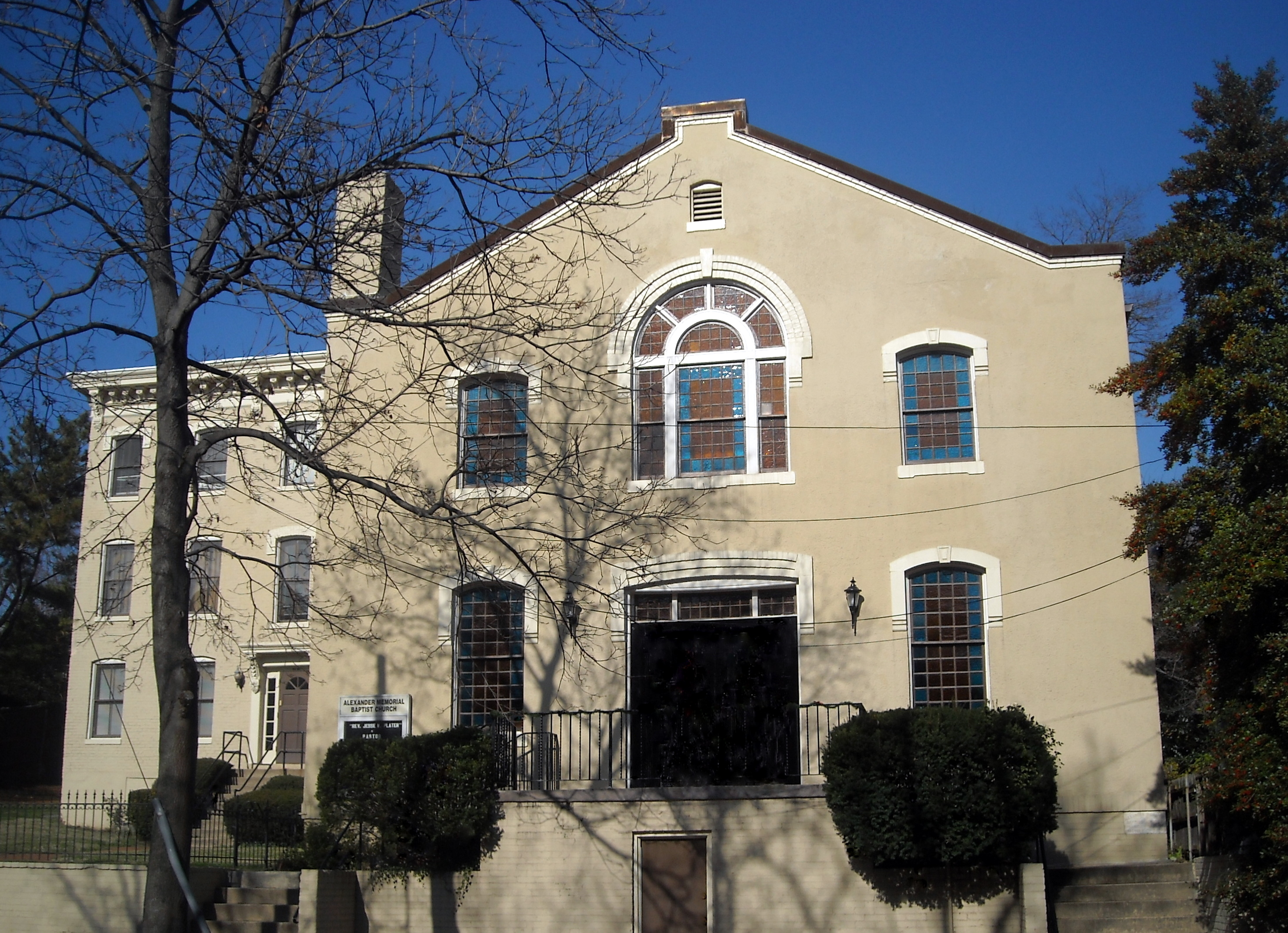
The church in 2009

Carroll remained as pastor of Alexander Memorial Baptist Church until 1914. He was succeeded by Reverend James L. Garfield, who led the church until 1917, and Reverend Leroy Fraser, who served as pastor from 1917 to 1941. Beginning in the 1930s, the demographics of Herring Hill and Georgetown began to change dramatically due to gentrification and discriminatory legislation targeting African American residents, including The Alley Dwelling Elimination Act and The Old Georgetown Act. Between 1930 and 1960 the percentage of Georgetown's population that was African American decreased from 30% to 9%.

During this demographic shift, Reverend Charles S. Pryor led the congregation from 1942 to 1972. While he served as pastor, the congregation paid off the church's mortgage and a second mortgage that had been taken out to finance extensive renovations. Reverend James A. Godfrey served as pastor from 1973 to 1988. In the mid-1980s, the former residence purchased in 1908 that had served as a parsonage was converted into the Charles S. Pryor Fellowship Hall. By this time, the church's membership had decreased to around 125 active members. Only half of these members still lived in the neighborhood. After Godfrey retired, he was succeeded by Reverend Lamar McClain, who served as pastor from 1988 to 1997, followed by Reverend Marvin W. Rodgers, Jr., from 1999 to 2003. The current pastor, Reverend Jesse W. Plater, has led the church since 2005.

==== Sale and relocation ====
In June 2013, the pastor and congregation decided to sell the church property and relocate to suburban Maryland, where most members reside. Not all members were pleased with the decision, especially since another property had not yet been purchased. One remarked, "So, if we don't have a place to go, why are you still selling the church?" Another said, "That's my home. It's gonna be gone, and we really don't have no place to go." With the church relocating, only three African American churches remained in the area since Epiphany Catholic Church had become a predominantly white congregation. The congregation worshipped for the last time in Georgetown on December 28, 2014.

The property, which included the sanctuary and fellowship hall, was initially listed for $7.5 million, but the asking price was later reduced to $6.5 million. Race car driver Will Langhorne was interested in purchasing the property to convert it into a private residence but later changed his mind. Because the buildings are contributing properties to the Georgetown Historic District, renovations had to be approved by the Old Georgetown Board, which is appointed by the United States Commission of Fine Arts.

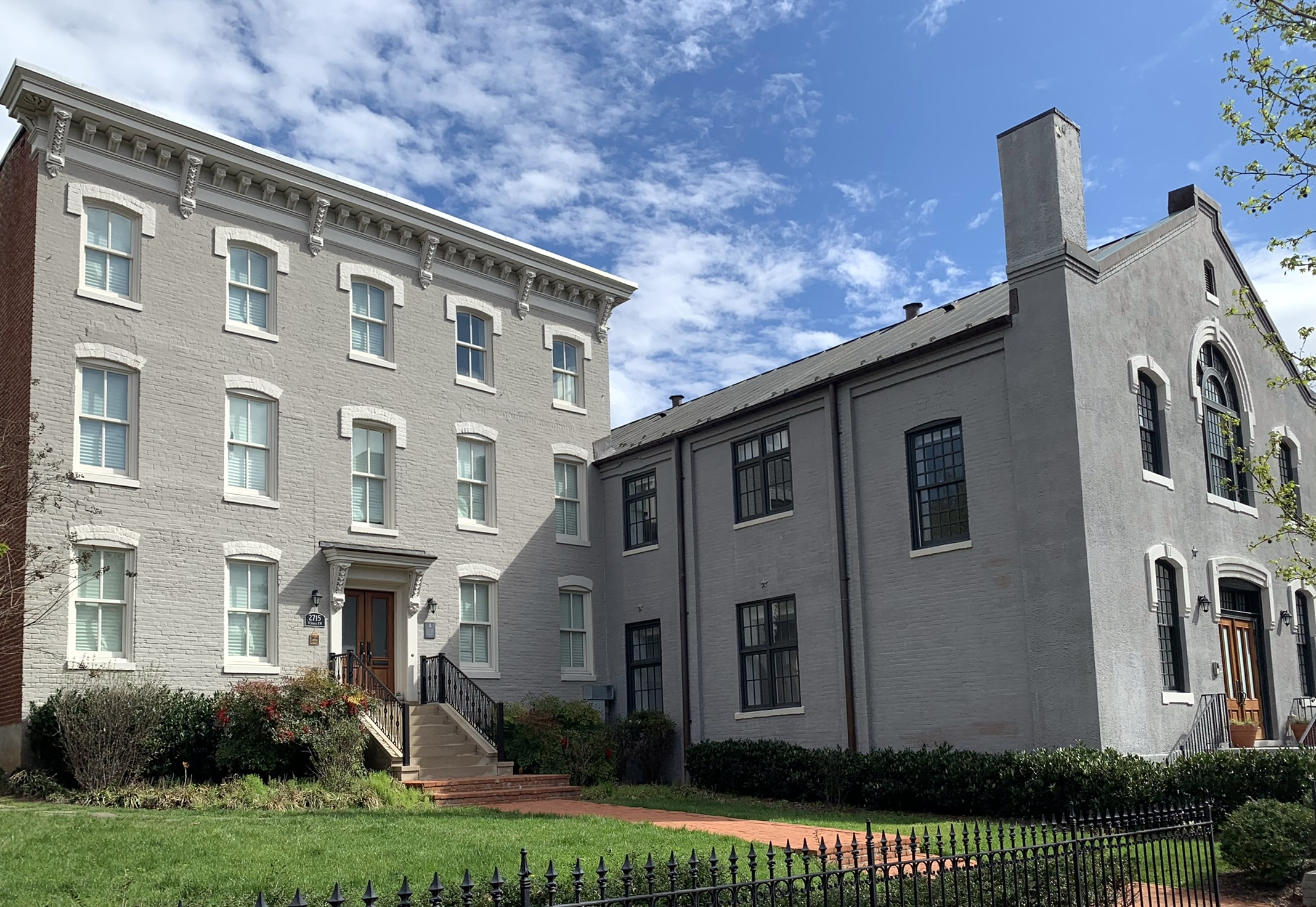
The former church in 2022

Real estate developer SGA Companies, which paid $7.56 million for the property, planned to convert the fellowship hall into a single-family residence, the sanctuary to be two condominium units, and build a new house west of the fellowship hall. After neighbors and local government agencies objected, SGA canceled plans for the new house. The final design included converting the sanctuary into three units instead of two. The conversion of the church into residences is part of a trend with local religious properties where memberships have decreased for various reasons. Local church buildings that were sold and converted into condominiums include Faith Baptist Church, Mount Joy Baptist Church, First African New Church, and Way of the Cross Church of Christ.

The conversion project designed by architect Sassan Gharai was named Alexander Hall, with the former fellowship hall renamed Hall House in honor of the previous residents. The Hall House was converted into a 5,250 square-foot (488 sq m) residence with seven bedrooms, seven bathrooms, an elevator, and a wine cellar designed to store more than 2,000 bottles. The asking price was $6,795,000. The former sanctuary was converted into three condominium units, each featuring three bedrooms and three bathrooms, and ranging from 2,100 to 2,500 square feet (195 sq m to 232 sq m). Those units were listed at between $1.995 million to $2.495 million and included membership services such as valet parking and access to the spa and fitness center at the nearby Four Seasons Hotel. Both buildings were available for sale at the asking price of $12,975,000.

After leaving Georgetown, the Alexander Memorial Baptist Church congregation met at the Francis Scott Key Elementary School in District Heights, Maryland, for 18 months. In 2016 the congregation moved to a new building located at 10675 Crain Highway in Upper Marlboro with the first service held there on July 3.
