= Samuel McGraw (disambiguation) =

Samuel Timothy McGraw is an American country music singer, songwriter and actor.

Samuel or Sam McGraw may also refer to:

- Samuel McGraw, namesake of McGraw, New York
- Sam McGraw, ring name of Barry Buchanan
