= Cyrus Pitt Grosvenor =

American Baptist minister known for his anti-slavery views

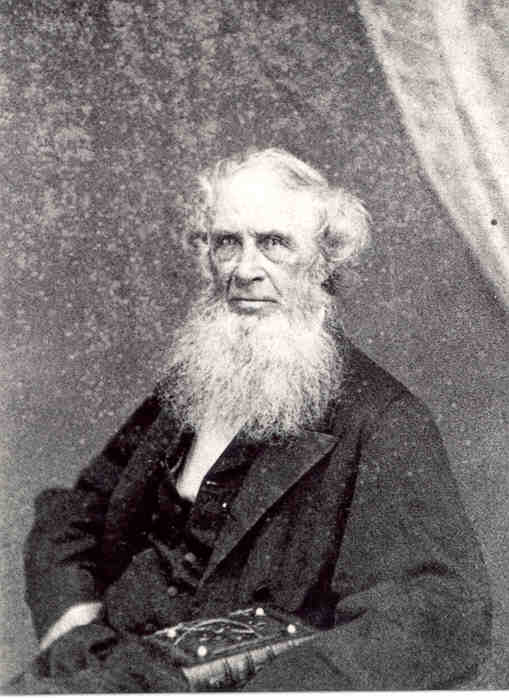
- Born: October 18, 1792; Grafton, Massachusetts, U.S.
- Died: February 11, 1879 (aged 86); Albion, Michigan, U.S.
- Education: Dartmouth College
- Occupations: Minister, educator
- Known for: American Baptist Free Mission Society
- Spouse: Sarah Warner
- Parent(s): Rev. Daniel and Mrs. Deborah Grosvenor

Cyrus Pitt Grosvenor (October 18, 1792 – February 11, 1879) was an American Baptist minister known for his anti-slavery views. He founded the abolitionist American Baptist Free Mission Society, which did not allow slaveowners to be missionaries, and refused their contributions, prefiguring the split in the Baptist Church in America into Southern and Northern associations. He helped found and served as the first president of New York Central College, the first college in the United States to admit both women and Blacks on an equal basis from its first day, and the first college to employ Black professors. He was described as "a reforming steam engine". In his retirement he worked on a famous mathematics problem and took out a patent to prevent lamp explosions.

== Biography ==
Cyrus Pitt Grosvenor was born in Grafton, Massachusetts, the son of Rev. Daniel and Deborah (Hall) Grosvenor. He studied theology with his father in Petersham, Massachusetts. He was at one point principal of the Haverhill Academy in Haverhill, New Hampshire. He graduated from Dartmouth College in 1818 and studied at Princeton Theological Seminary in 1821–22. He was a minister for congregations in New Haven, Salem, and Boston (1827–40) from 1825 to 1834. Grosvenor was a leader of the anti-slavery movement in Massachusetts and Connecticut, and an agent of the American Anti-Slavery Society. The first meeting of the Essex County Anti-Slavery Society was held at his house.

Grosvenor is in this painting which shows him at the 1840 Anti-Slavery Convention. Move your cursor to identify Grosvenor (who is behind Galusha) or click icon to enlarge

Grosvenor and Elon Galusha were the two leading Baptist ministers opposing slavery at the time. Grosvenor was "significantly admonished by a Rev. dignitary of his own denomination, ...that abolition ministers would soon be silenced, amid scenes of blood, if they could not otherwise be reduced to quietness."

Grosvenor was a proponent of the anti-slavery Liberty Party.

In 1840 he attended the first World Anti-Slavery Convention in London, where he was included in the commemorative painting by Benjamin Haydon, although Grosvenor's face is obscured by Galusha and Henry Sterry. There was a delegation from Massachusetts that included Galusha, George Bradburn, Lydia Maria Child, Harriet Martineau, William Lloyd Garrison, Wendell Phillips and Maria Weston Chapman. In the same year, Grosvenor published a book which investigated whether slavery was or was not endorsed by the Bible.

Grosvenor was the founding editor of the Baptist Anti-Slavery Correspondent, which was first published in February 1841 in Worcester, Massachusetts.

In 1844, Grosvenor led the formation of an American missionary society. He was disappointed that Baptist church leaders were unwilling to eject people involved with slavery from the church. He decided that a new organization was required to take a stronger moral position. This was the American Baptist Free Mission Society.

In 1849 he was among the founders of New-York Central College in McGraw, New York. He served as its first president.

Grosvenor married Sarah Warner and they had three children. Their son Cyrus Pitt Daniel Grosvenor (1828–1849), born in Utica, New York was a printer. One daughter, Emma P. (1832–1853) also died young. Sarah Caroline Grosvenor (1828–1921) married Baptist Rev. Austin Harman in 1852, and they moved to Allegan County, Michigan, followed by her parents. Grosvenor had retired from the college the year after his daughter married. In 1856, Grosvenor's wife died.

During the Civil War Grosvenor went to England, as there was a price on his head.

== Science ==
In 1867, Grosvenor applied for a patent for an idea he had to prevent lamps from exploding by using a reservoir of nitrogen. The following year Grosvenor published a study in mathematics relating to the problem of squaring the circle. The problem is an old one and can be stated simply as "Is it possible to construct a square with the same area as a given circle using only a compass and ruler". Grosvenor described a method in a pamphlet titled The circle squared a method for determining the area of a circle squared that as a result gave a value for π (Pi) that was 3.142135... (Pi is 3.14159...).

Square the diameter of the circle; multiply the square by 2; extract the square root of the product; from the root subtract the diameter of the circle; square the remainder; multiply this square by four fifths; subtract the square from the diameter of the circle.

This gave a small but real error. The success of the method was measured by the error only being 0.000543. It was later proved (in 1882) that there is no precise geometric method of squaring the circle.

In 1867 Grosvenor received an honorary LLD (Doctor of Laws) degree.

Grosvenor died in Albion, Michigan, in 1879 and was buried at the Riverside Cemetery.
