= Asaph Hall Jr. =

American astronomer

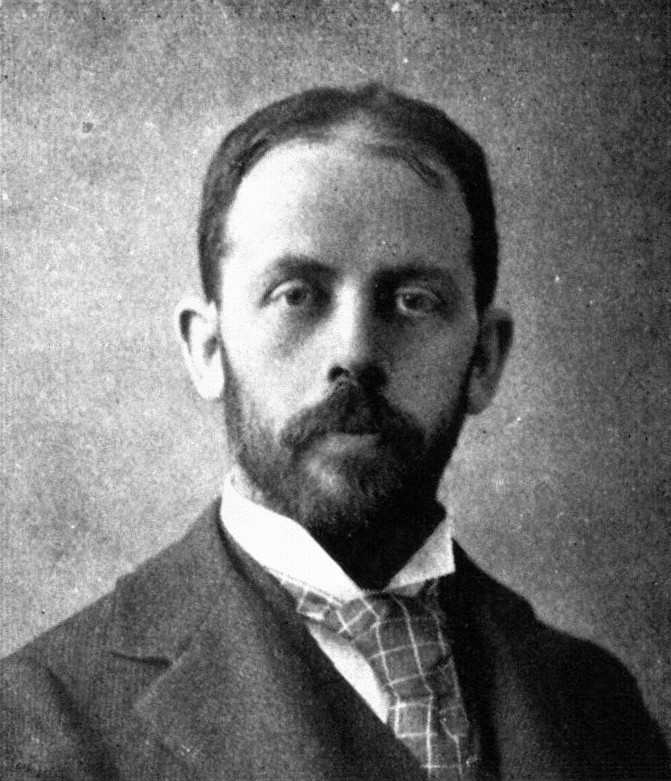
- Hall from the 1902 Michiganensian
- Born: October 6, 1859; Cambridge, Massachusetts, US
- Died: January 12, 1930 (aged 70)
- Education: Harvard University, Yale University
- Scientific career
- Fields: Astronomy
- Workplaces: U. S. Naval Observatory, University of Michigan

Asaph Hall IV (October 6, 1859 – January 12, 1930), known as Asaph Hall Jr., was an American astronomer. He was the son of Asaph Hall, who discovered the moons of the planet Mars. One of his brothers was Percival Hall.

== Early life ==
Hall was born in Cambridge, Massachusetts in 1859. He was the son of the astronomer Asaph Hall and the mathematician Angeline Stickney Hall. His father was best known for having discovered the two moons of Mars, Deimos and Phobos. He grew up in Washington, D.C., where his father worked at the United States Naval Observatory. He attended the Columbian College in the District of Columbia (now George Washington University) and then Harvard University, where he received his undergraduate degree in 1882.

After graduation Hall became an assistant astronomer at the Naval Observatory from 1882-1885. In 1885 he went to Yale University as a graduate student and an assistant at Yale Observatory. Hall received his Ph.D. in 1889 from Yale University when he submitted his thesis explaining the mass of Saturn and the orbit of Titan. Because of a large difference between his father's measurement of the mass of Saturn at the Naval Observatory and that of Friedrich Bessel in Germany, Hall used the Yale heliometer to determine the mass of Saturn using the orbit of Titan when writing this thesis paper. His results confirmed Bessel's measurement. After receiving his PhD, Hall returned to the Naval Observatory until 1892, when he then took over the responsibilities as Director of the Detroit Observatory and professor of astronomy at the University of Michigan. One of his more notable students who he worked closely with at the Detroit Observatory through the University of Michigan was Harriet Williams Bigelow.

== Subsequent career ==
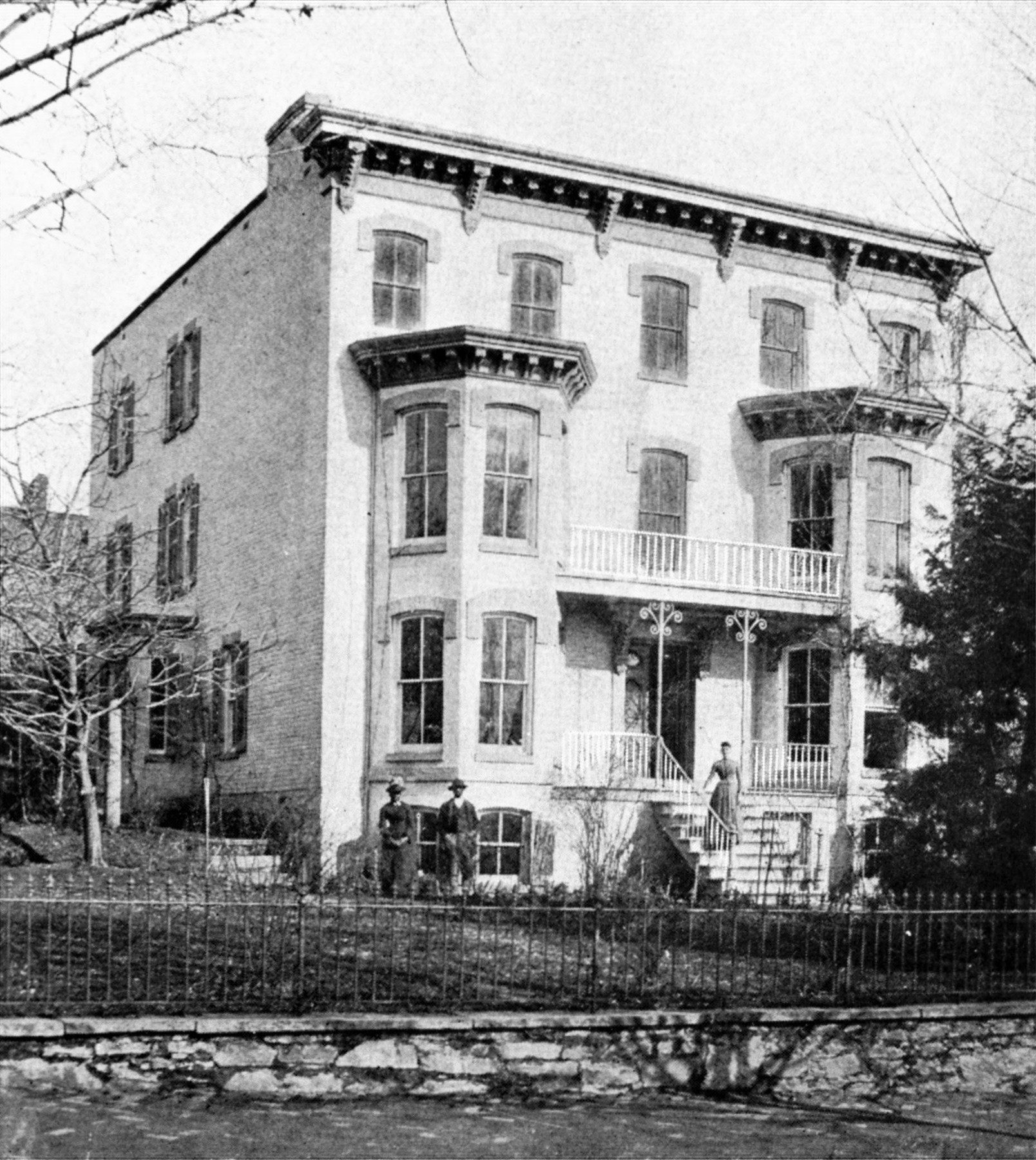
Hall's childhood home, in the Georgetown neighborhood of Washington, D.C. Note his mother Angeline on front steps, and two Black workers. The house later served as the parsonage and fellowship hall of Alexander Memorial Baptist Church.

During his time at the University of Michigan, he repaired the meridian circle and used it to do a determination of the constant of aberration. Hall made this determination with the newly repaired Meridian Circle, by examining zenith distances from Polaris. This was one of the crowning achievements of his career at the University of Michigan, both for his repairs performed on the Meridian Circle, which was in poor condition prior, and for the scientific impact his determination of the constant of aberration.

In 1905 he returned to the Naval Observatory, to continue his work in research using the meridian circle of the U.S. Naval Observatory. In 1908, Hall was promoted to Professor of Mathematics at the rank of Commander in the Navy, at which point he took over all equatorial research for the Observatory. Included in this, was his work on the orbits of planetary satellites using the 26-inch (66-cm) telescope, the great refractor of his father's discoveries. He retired in 1929 and died the following year. He is buried in Arlington National Cemetery. His career is used as an example in John Lankford's study of the sociology of astronomy.

== Personal life ==
In 1897, Asaph Hall Jr. married Mary Estella Cockrell who he later had two children with, Katherine and Mary. Outside of his actual astronomical work, Hall also was influential in securing fair pay for the other workers around him at the U.S. Naval Observatory. In addition, Hall was very dedicated to expanding and improving the library of the Naval Observatory when he was not conducting his research. After retiring in 1929, Hall moved to Upper Darby, Pennsylvania, near the Flower Observatory operated by the University of Pennsylvania. There, he spent the remainder of his life working as a volunteer observer until his death on January 12, 1930.
