= Main Street Historic District (McGraw, New York) =

Historic district in New York, United States

- U.S. National Register of Historic Places
- U.S. Historic district
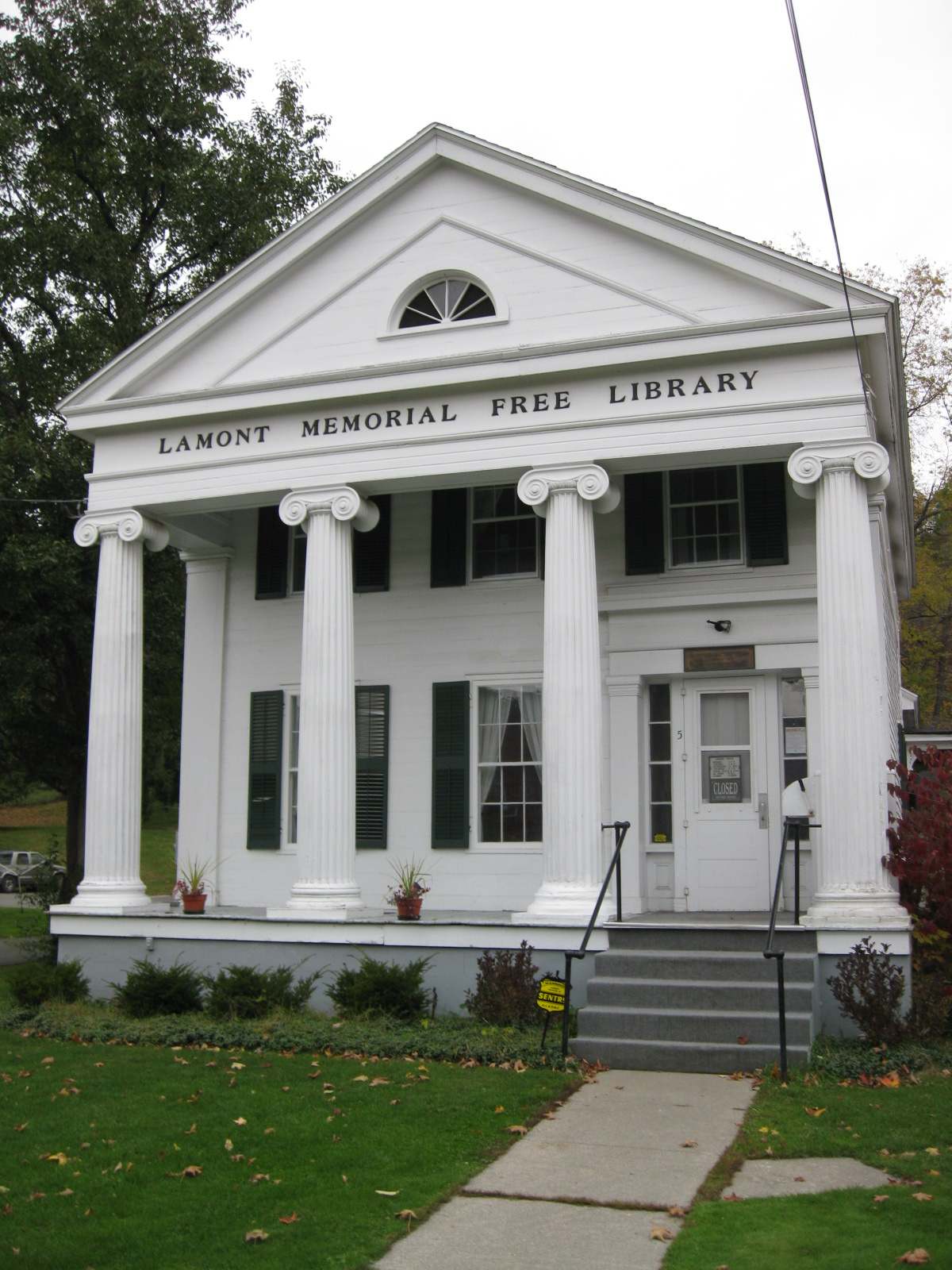
- Lamont Free Library, McGraw, New York, October 2009

- Location within New York Location within the United States
- Location: Roughly on Main St. between South and Washington Sts., McGraw, New York
- Coordinates: 42°35′46″N 76°5′35″W
- Area: 11 acres (4.5 ha)
- Architectural style: Greek Revival, Late Victorian, Federal
- NRHP reference No.: 86002773
- Added to NRHP: September 25, 1986

Main Street Historic District is a national historic district located at McGraw in Cortland County, New York. The district includes 33 contributing buildings, one contributing site, and one contributing structure.

It was listed on the National Register of Historic Places in 1986.

== Description ==
The Main Street Historic District stands in the middle of McGraw incorporated village. The village of McGraw is situated in Cortland County which is largely an agricultural area. As the Main Street Historic District is linear in configuration, it incorporates both sides of Main Street between South Street at the west end and Washington Street at the east end. The whole business district of McGraw, 2 main churches, the library, and many of the preliminary and most important residences of the village are located in the Main Street Historic District. The Historic District also contains 27 contributing principal buildings, 6 contributing dependencies (buildings), 1 contributing structure, in total 34 contributing resources. Three non-contributing buildings are there as well. In spite of other potentially eligible buildings and districts being present in the village, none is contiguous with the Main Street Historic District.

== Significance ==
The Main Street Historic District is noteworthy for its architectural concentration on the historic residential, religious and commercial buildings. Eight vernacular Federal style houses represented the primary development and the earliest substantial frame dwellings built in McGraw. In the 1840s and 1850's, the Greek Revival style became very popular in New York. The style is depicted in the Historic District by the 1845 Lamont Memorial Library which previously was a residence of the eminent McGraw family designed with a distinctive Ionic order portico. The Main Street Historic District also has a series of commercial buildings of late Victorian period which were constructed with brick and stamped-metal facades in 1906. These buildings portray McGraw's early 20th century affluence and the influence of mass-produced building materials on the design of small town commercial buildings after 1890. Two of the 1830’s churches located in the Main Street Historic District were modified to a great extent in 1919 and 1920 to show the unprecedentedly late continuation of delightful tastes in some rural villages well into the 20th century. The preservation of the historic streetscapes and architectural character in the Historic District started after 1920 since the importance of McGraw's principal industry slowed growth and construction in the village. At present, McGraw's Main Street Historic District is one of the small town centers in Cortland County that survive with adequate physical integrity to mirror the county's broad and diverse architectural heritage.
