= Harriet Williams Bigelow =

American professor and astronomer

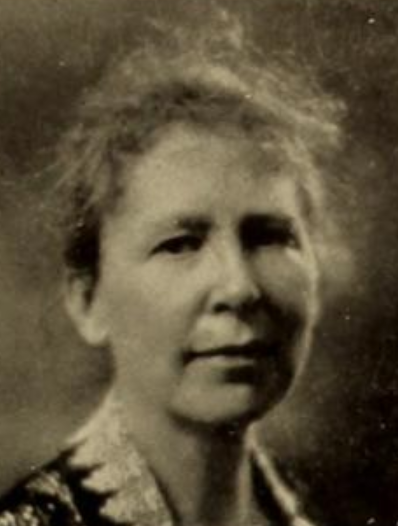
- Harriet Williams Bigelow, from the 1925 Smith College yearbook
- Born: June 7, 1870; Fayetteville, New York, US
- Died: June 27, 1934 (aged 64); Soerabaja, Java
- Education: Smith College; University of Michigan
- Occupations: Professor, astronomer
- Parent(s): Dana Williams Bigelow; Katherine Huntington

Harriet Williams Bigelow (June 7, 1870 − June 27, 1934) was an American professor and astronomer.

Born in Fayetteville, New York, Harriet was the daughter of pastor Dana Williams Bigelow and Katherine Huntington. Her family moved to Pitcher, New York, then in 1878 to Utica, New York where her father became pastor at the Memorial Presbyterian Church. Harriet attended the local public schools, graduating from Utica Free Academy in 1889. She matriculated to Smith College, a women's liberal arts college in Massachusetts, where she studied astronomy.

After graduating with an A.B. in 1893, she taught at Granger Place school in Canandaigua, New York. In 1896, she was invited back to Smith College as an astronomy assistant under her former instructor, Mary Emma Byrd, a pioneer in the laboratory method of teaching astronomy. She attended the University of Michigan in 1901, where she continued her studies in astronomy. In 1904, she was awarded a Ph.D. under the direction of Asaph Hall with a thesis titled Declinations of Certain North Polar Stars Determined with the Meridian Circle.

She became director of the Smith College Observatory in 1906, replacing Mary Byrd, and was made an associate professor at the college. Harriet attained professor status in 1911 and became head of the college's astronomy department. Between 1905 and 1928, she published seven papers in the Astronomical Journal, primarily on the topic of comets. In 1923, she joined the solar eclipse expedition to the Santa Catalina Island, California. During her career, she served as vice president and president of the American Association of Variable Star Observers, and was a councilor for the American Astronomical Society during the period 1932−35.

In 1934, she took a sabbatical year and traveled with her sister to Manila. She was on her way to visit observatories in South Africa when she died suddenly in Java.
