= Charles L. Reason =

American linguist

Charles Lewis Reason
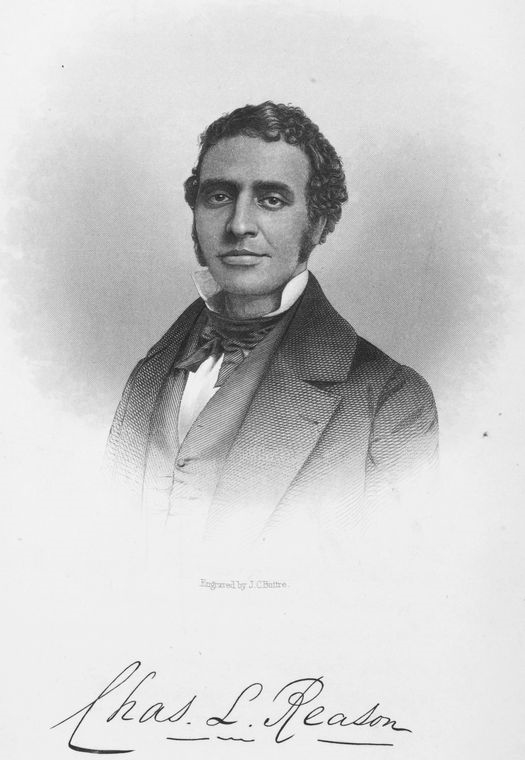
- Reason in 1854
- Born: July 21, 1818; New York City
- Died: August 16, 1893 (aged 75); New York City
- Occupation: Professor

Charles Lewis Reason (July 21, 1818 – August 16, 1893) was an American mathematician, linguist, and educator. He was the first black college professor in the United States, teaching at New York Central College, McGrawville. He was born and died in New York City.

== Early life and education ==
Reason was born July 21, 1818, in New York City as one of three sons to Michel and Elizabeth (Melville) Reason, free people of color (their surname was originally Rison) from Guadeloupe and Saint-Domingue, respectively. They had immigrated as refugees in 1793 shortly after the early years of the Haitian Revolution. His brothers were Elwer W. and Patrick H. Reason, who also became leaders. Their older sister Policarpe died in 1818 at age four.

Charles and two of his brothers attended the African Free School in New York; among their classmates were Henry Highland Garnet, George T. Downing, and Ira Aldridge. As Charles was a child prodigy in mathematics, he began teaching the subject there, at the age of fourteen.

He attended the short-lived Noyes Academy in Canaan, New Hampshire, in 1835. He next appears in 1849 as a faculty member, giving an inaugural address, at the New York Central College, an integrated institution founded by members of the American Baptist Free Mission Society in McGraw, New York (then called McGrawville, not to be confused with the current McGrawville).

He was described as of "fair education and superior intelligence, 'complexion very light, beautiful black curly hair and a magnificent moustache'. He would very easily pass for an Anglo-Saxon." Another description says he is "one of the most courtly gentlemen of the colored race in this city" (New York).

== Career ==
Reason's first teaching job, in the 1830s, was at "the Quaker school in Laurens Street."

In addition to teaching, Reason lobbied New York to repeal the state's "sojourner law," which allowed slaveholders from other states to bring their slaves to New York, allowing "free and unfettered" movement for them with the accompanying slaves. Reason's work helped to secure the right of blacks accused of being runaway slaves to a jury trial.

In 1847, Reason, along with Charles Bennett Ray, founded the New York-based Society for the Promotion of Education among Colored Children. Two years later, he was appointed professor of belles-lettres, Greek, Latin, and French at New York Central College, McGrawville, while also serving as an adjunct professor of mathematics. Central College was the first college to be integrated from its opening day; it hired Reason as the most qualified applicant. Reason was thus both the first Black professor, and the first Black teacher with white students, in the United States. He was described in a newspaper as "an accomplished and attractive man, and...a fine and ripe scholar, ...highly popular with the students, and with the citizens of McGrawville."

In 1852, Reason left that post to become the principal of the Quaker Institute for Colored Youth in Philadelphia (later Cheyney University of Pennsylvania), a post he held until 1856. During his time there, Reason increased enrollment from six students to 118. Here he favored math and the sciences, but gradually included other areas of study, particularly languages. Seniors expected their grades to appear in the most widely circulated paper in the U.S. black communities: the A.M.E.'s Christian Recorder. Half of the students normally failed to graduate. Though instruction was strict, and exams were rigorous, parents scrambled to register their children.

Reason returned to New York, where he served for decades in public education as a teacher, administrator, and reformer. He was principal of Colored Grammar School No. 3, at 78 West 40th Street. Later he was principal of Colored School No. 6 on 36th Street. During this time, he was instrumental in efforts to abolish slavery and segregation. He was a delegate to the Colored Labor Convention held in Saratoga Springs, New York, in 1870. He successfully lobbied for passage of an 1873 statute to integrate New York's public schools; however, in 1876 he was the head of New York City's colored public schools. He was politically active in many community groups. In the presidential election of 1884 he was a candidate for the Electoral College, at the moment a politically important position, on the Republican ticket.

Reason was a devout Catholic, attending St. Peter's Catholic Church in Manhattan and corresponding in 1872 with Cardinal Herbert Vaughan concerning the plight of African-American Catholics.

In 1878, he owned a brownstone at 242 East 53rd St. It was filled with books. He was described as "a remarkably well-read man and speaks several languages. ...He is said to be worth $60,000" (equivalent to $2,001,724 in 2025).

After the public schools in New York City were desegregated, he became principal of Grammar School No. 80 at 252 West 42nd Street. Although his two strokes (one in 1885 and one in 1890) left him physically incapacitated, Reason continued at his post until he retired, some five months before his death.

Reason was also a poet. He contributed to the Colored American in the 1830s and was a leader of New York City's Phoenix Society in the 1840s. He wrote the poem "Freedom", which celebrated the British abolitionist Thomas Clarkson; it was published in Alexander Crummell's 1849 biography of Clarkson.

== Marriage and family ==
Not much documentation has been found on Reason's personal life, but he was said to have been married and widowed three times. His third and final wife was Clorice (Duplessis) Esteve (1819–1884), whom he married in New York City on July 17, 1855. They had no children, although she had a daughter from her previous marriage to John Lucien Esteve (1809–1852), a French West Indian confectioner, restaurateur, and caterer in New York City.

Reason had two strokes, which, after a recovery period, required him to go to work in a carriage, as he could not walk. He retired five months before his death. He died in his 53rd St. home in New York City in 1893. The cause of his death was specified as Bright's disease. His estate was estimated at $30,000.

== See also ==
- List of African-American pioneers in desegregation of higher education
