= New York Central College =

Liberal arts college in New York state, U.S.

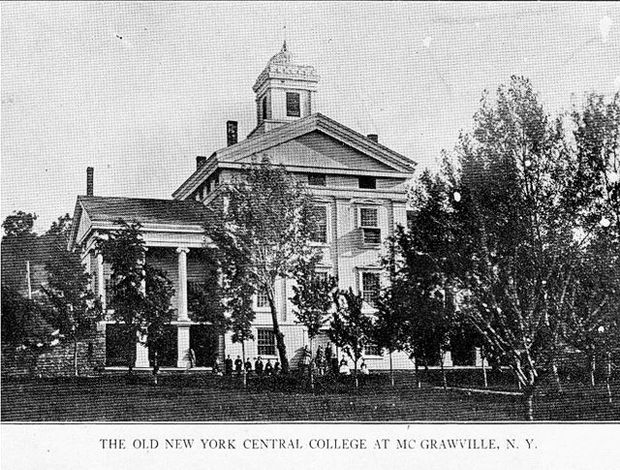
- Main building, 1850. The first two floors held classrooms and the third a dormitory for male students.
- Other names: Central College, McGrawville
- Active: 1849–1860
- Founder: Cyrus Pitt Grosvenor
- Religious affiliation: Baptist
- Students: 100–200
- Location: McGraw (at the time called McGrawville), Cortland County, New York, 13101, United States; 42.5961°N 76.0931°W

New York Central College was a short-lived college founded in McGraw, New York, in 1848 by abolitionist Baptists led by Cyrus Pitt Grosvenor. The first college in the United States founded on the principle that all qualified students were welcome, it was sponsored by the American Baptist Free Mission Society, of which Grosvenor was a vice-president.

It was chartered by New York State in April 1848, laid the cornerstone of its main building on July 4, and opened in September 1849. The school was further distinguished by both being radically anti-slavery and committed to the equality of the sexes. It has been called a predecessor of Cornell University.

The college was primarily a large preparatory school, and lasted about 10 years. Students at the college level were never more than a small minority of the student body. At the first commencement in 1855, there were five graduates among a student body of well over 100, including some enrolled at the primary level. Nonetheless, it was not an academy, whose studies ended at the high school level, but offered education beyond.

== The American Baptist Free Mission Society ==
=== Abolitionism ===
The American Baptist Free Mission Society broke away from its parent, the American Baptist Home Mission Society, over the issue of slavery, more specifically whether slaveowners could be members, missionaries, or donors to the society. From the beginning, the College was to be open to all, whatever the "race" or gender. At the presentation to the citizens of McGrawville, its description begins by stating it will differ from the Hamilton Literary & Theological Institution (now Colgate University) in only one feature: "it lays down as a broad platform, the rights and privileges of all classes of citizens as of paramount importance. It will be an Institution of Learning from which no individual will be rejected." Hamilton had a reputation for not opposing slavery; Gerrit Smith resigned from their Board of Trustees "on the grounds that the school was insufficiently anti-slavery". When Hamilton students sent a petition to the New York Legislature "in behalf of the oppressed free colored citizens of the state", this made them "guilty of the awful crime of abolitionism", and the Legislature almost immediately withdrew the College's $5,000 appropriation. The President and five professors, with the support of "citizens of Oneida County", informed the legislature than an outsider (a legislator) had misled the students, who "disclaim all sympathy with abolition societies". The anti-slavery petition was unauthorized by the faculty, and "at variance with the principles of the college government, and with the judgment and feeling of every officer of the institution". The appropriation was immediately restored.

=== Founding of its college ===
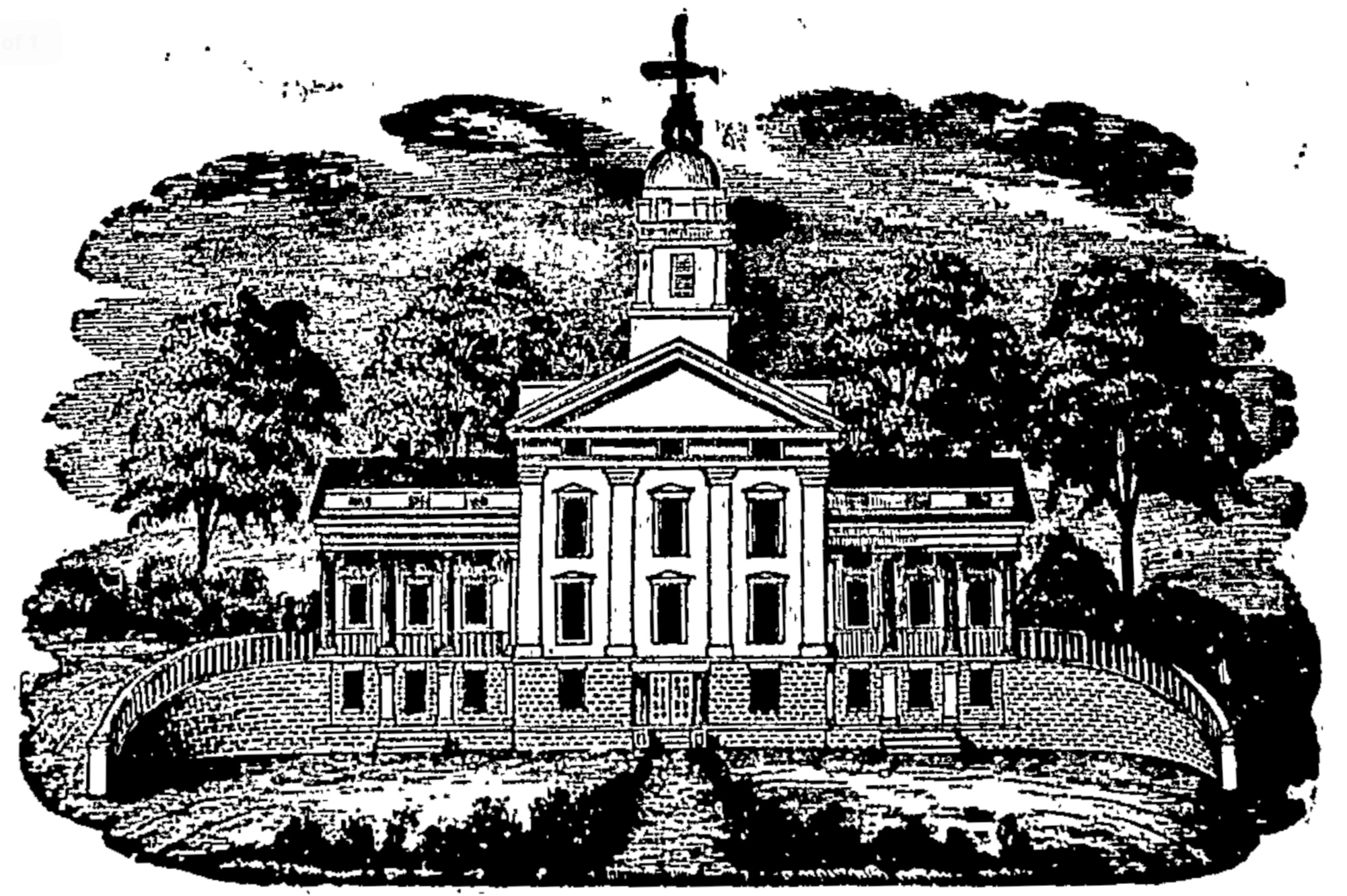
New York Central College at its opening in 1849

The College was founded in McGrawville, "a quiet and healthy place" according to the college's advertisement in the abolitionist National Era, because of a pledge by the village of $12,000 (equivalent to $414,643 in 2025) towards construction costs; Perry, New York, had offered $10,000. The initial community meeting in McGrawville to discuss the proposed college was held on November 22, 1847. It already had a board of trustees, with Reverend Cyrus Pitt Grosvenor of Utica, who spoke at the meeting, as President. Its location not yet determined, it was referred to as the "Baptist Free Mission Institution". Construction commenced on June 26, 1848, and the cornerstone was laid on July 4. In the cornerstone was a box with 20 items, many of them abolitionist newspapers or pamphlets. By then it was referred to as the Free Central College.

While Oberlin and Oneida had accepted African-American students, and Oberlin female students, New York Central College was the first institution in the country founded to accept all students.

Speaking at the laying of the cornerstone, Grosvenor "vindicated the character of Women, repelled the idea of her inferiority to man, and maintained the necessity of giving to our daughters an education equal to that given to our sons."

The Bible was "to be introduced as a text-book and test-book from beginning to end of the course of instruction." Manual labor, including farmwork, was to be part of students' daily activities. This was not just for finances, although it brought in a little money, nor to prepare students for careers, to which the labor was usually unrelated, but was seen as psychologically and spiritually beneficial. At the time, this was an innovative view.

Some opposition from those with means of the labor requirement was met with a stinging reply:

It is said that manual labor connected with colleges and literary institutions [non-theological colleges] will have a tendency to fill our learned professions with a race of slovens. Let it be so. Let the sacramental host be led on to victory, and the portals of the scientific arcana, be opened and lit up by the blazing genius of sturdy clowns in homespun, with master intellects, and daring spirits, rather than be offered by Knights of the reticule; valorous in their onset upon cologne bottles; and prodigies of prowess among spices of Rosemary..... this MODEL COLLEGE, based on the republican rock of changeless truth, and canopied by the star-jeweled firmament of philosophy, which is in truth, designed to rebuke the withering spirit of caste, and make all forms of useful industry respectable, and furnish community with practical men and women.

With emotions of irresistible joy, I hail the dawning of the day in which, by the influence of the system of CENTRAL COLLEGE all aristocratic distinctions in societry, created by wealth, sect, party or learning, shall be brought down to a REPUBLICAN LEVEL.

New York Central College was the name decided on, and the College was chartered by the New York State Legislature on April 12, 1848. The Board of Trustees had 24 members.

The College began activities on September 4, 1849. Black professor Charles L. Reason delivered an inaugural address, on the topic "Harmony of the Principles of the College with Man's True Destiny and the Tendencies of the Present Age." It was described in the press as "full of clear comprehensive, philosophical thought, clothed in a neat and classical dress." President Grosvenor spoke on "Education: Physical, Mental, and Moral." The abolitionist philanthropist Gerrit Smith also spoke. There was a "congregation" of more than 2,000 at the induction of the faculty, the following day.

== Overviews of the Central College experience ==
As part of an unsuccessful attempt to have a medical school open to all students established in McGrawville, William G. Allen wrote to Gerrit Smith that "[n]o where is the state of things more favorable to the colored man's progress than in McGrawville, and no where would he receive a warmer welcome." At the time—1852—Allen was the only Black college professor in the country.

=== A description of the people at a college dinner, 1850 ===
What a sight at the tables! The interview will remain in our memory as one of the most happy events in our life! ...Professor Reason sat at the head of one table, Rev. Dr. Bush on his left, and on his right President Grosvenor, ourself, still flanked by [A. H.] Benedict of the [Cortland County] Express, his mouth watering for the baked beans and Graham bread. Professor Reason is a mulatto, we believe—a noble looking man, urbane and polished in his manners, and his countenance the undisguised index of goodness and truth. To the left of Dr. Bush, were two negro students. still further down was Mahomah [Baquaqua], a native from the interior of Africa, now a student here, after many vicissitudes. Across from our table...sat a squaw of the Onondaga tribe.... A runaway slave sat near her, while her father, husband, and brother were in view. After supper, the stewardess with some of the female students, sang: "Be kind to each other" [a hymn]. The Onondagas then gave one in their own tongue, Mahomah chanted one in Arabic. Miss Havens sang in Latin and French. The President made some remarks in Hebrew by way of carrying out the idea, and with hearts warmer with kindly feelings, the interview terminated. May we all meet again as happily.

Two Onondaga Native Americans enrolled in the Preparatory Division.

=== Summary by a graduate ===
This is how the college was described by an alumna and instructor, Angeline Stickney:

[T]he world will frown upon me, because I am a student of this unpopular institution, and I expect to get the name that I have heard applied to all who come here, "fanatic". I am glad that I am here because I love this institution. I love the spirit that welcomes all to its halls, those of every tongue, and of every hue, which admits of "no rights exclusive", which holds out the cup of knowledge in its crystal brightness for all to quaff; and if this is fanaticism, I will glory in the name "fanatic." Let me live, let me die a fanatic. I will not seal up in my heart the fountain of love that gushes forth for all the human race. And I am glad I am here because there are none here to say, "thus far thou mayst ascend the hill of Science and no farther," when I have just learned how sweet are the fruits of knowledge, and when I can see them hanging in such rich clusters, far up the heights, looking so bright and golden, as if they were inviting me to partake. And all the while I can see my brother gathering those golden fruits, and I mark how his eye brightens.... No, there are none here to whisper, "that is beyond thy sphere, thou couldst never scale those dizzy heights"; but, on the contrary, here are kind voices cheering me onward.

== Faculty, students, curriculum ==
The affairs of the college were conducted with a high degree of informality and lack of rules relative to today's standards. There was no "mission statement", no academic ranks, no specific degree requirements (that would have been difficult to maintain with an ever-changing, variably qualified faculty). Only board of trustees minutes and financial records were kept, supplemented by correspondence and many newspaper articles.

Most of the faculty's time was spent in contact with students, teaching formally or informally. McGrawville was a small town, most attended the same church, and all interested heard the same visiting lecturers.

Alcohol was prohibited even to faculty, and tobacco also forbidden in the college.

=== College finances ===
There were no financial plans or budgets at the college, and little fundraising. As a result, the school's financial affairs were disorganized and difficult. In contrast with its predecessor the Oneida Institute, no one went calling on possible donors, and the college did not publicize itself, either to raise its esteem or attract applicants.

Inadequately funded from beginning to end, the college ended in bankruptcy. Except for Gerrit Smith, it had no wealthy donors, and over its short history and few college-level graduates no meaningful alumni pool to draw upon. The American Baptist Free Mission Society gave what support it could, especially at the beginning, but it was a small group with limited resources.

There are contradictory reports about subvention(s) from the New York State Legislature, such as Union College, Columbia College, and others routinely received. If there was legislative support, it was not ongoing.

The student body was relatively poor, required to pay its own tuition, room and board, and transportation. With a student body composed half of African-Americans, and most of whom were at the high school level, and 30% female, could neither make the school financially prosperous nor even self-sufficient. The 30% of the students who were female were also anything but prosperous. Some money was brought in through the manual labor department, but not enough.

Tuition was set low to accommodate the students it attracted, inadequate to cover expenses. In the college division it was first $24, then $30 per year (equivalent to $1,161 in 2025), and in the preparatory (high school) division, $15. The vast majority of students were in the preparatory program. An estimated 100 preparatory students per year, at $15 each, is $1,500. An estimated 20 college students at $30 each would bring in $600, for a total of $2,100 (equivalent to $81,270 in 2025). By comparison, 15 years previously the Canterbury Female Boarding School charged $75 for tuition, meaning the tuition paid by its 24 students totalled $1,800.

Funds available to pay faculty, therefore, were very limited, and doubtless contributed to the high faculty turnover. Except for Grosvenor, whose children were grown, faculty were unmarried and did not have families, as their salaries would not permit it.

Previously schools with "racially" integrated bodies (the Noyes Academy and the Canterbury Female Boarding School) were quickly destroyed by white mob violence. New York Central College avoided such difficulty during its brief tenure.

== Faculty ==
There were no written criteria for selecting faculty; some came with a college degree, but many did not. Apparently the President, Grosvenor and then Calkins, decided himself whom to hire and what they would teach. There was no public announcement of vacancies, neither was there an application process nor documents required. Personal contacts and correspondence played a big role. The difference between the courses and teachers for the large preparatory or high school division, and the smaller college division, was not rigid. Two faculty (Caldwell, Smith) began as students and joined the faculty upon their graduation; one (Stickney) was teaching in advance of her graduation.

The subjects taught varied depending on available personnel. There was, therefore, not a faculty in the sense of a body of full-time employees, and turnover was frequent.

Central was the first college to hire African-American faculty. There were three very well qualified African-American professors, who successively occupied the same position: Charles L. Reason (1849-1852), William G. Allen (1852–1853), and George Boyer Vashon (1853–1859).

There are two known lists of the faculty (in newspaper announcements). The original faculty, in 1849, were:

- C. P. Grosvenor, President, and Professor of Intellectual and Moral Philosophy (epistemology and ethics). He resigned at the end of 1851. He was replaced by Leonard G. Calkins, "a finished scholar, an accomplished orator, and a true gentleman, a deep thinker, of active temperament".
- L. H. Waters and Charles L. Reason, Professors of Greek, Latin and French Languages, and Mathematics and Natural Philosophy (science). Reason was the first African-American faculty member in an American college.
- Victor M. Kingsley (1821–1897), Tutor
- Mrs. Eliza M. Haven, "Matron, and Prof. French Language, Music, Drawing, &c."
- Miss Sophia M. Lathrop [Bishop] (1828–1913), "Prof. English Literature, &c." Nothing is known about her education. She first taught in Friendship, New York. She only taught at Central for one year; afterwards she was Preceptress at the Hamilton Female Seminary in Hamilton, New York. Her sister Maria E. Lathrop [Bean] (1833–1908) studied at Central and also taught painting there.

By 1852, three years later, the faculty were completely different (100% turnover):

- Wm. Tillinghast, A.M., professor of mathematics
- William G. Allen, African-American professor of Greek and German Languages, rhetoric, and belles lettres (literature). After the departure of Grosvenor, who taught Hebrew, Allen was listed as teaching it. After Allen's departure in 1853, his position was filled by George Boyer Vashon.
- E. R. Akin, A. M., D. M., professor of natural sciences
- A. B. Campbell, A. M, professor of Latin language and Literature
- George Lester Brockett (1827–1880), graduate of Hamilton College in 1851, was described in an obituary as professor of Elocution and German. However, he also taught Greek, German, and Physiology. "In 1852, he was also a tutor and the Librarian." His father had been a warm personal friend of abolitionists Beriah Green and Gerrit Smith. In 1857 his wife Caroline A. Campbell, "the former accomplished teacher in the department of Drawing and Painting", was rehired.
- G. L. Brockett, A. B., tutor. She was still employed in 1858, when she spoke "forcibly" against the skirt at a National Dress Reform Convention (see Bloomers (clothing)).
- A. J. Chamberlain, teacher of French and drawing.
- Lydia A. Caldwell, enrolled as a student when the College opened in 1849. The year in which she graduated and became a teacher, if she did in fact graduate, is unknown, but she remained until 1855 as "Professor of Rhetoric and English Literature". She died in 1857 of tuberculosis ("consumption"). Effusive prose pieces and poetry by Caldwell appeared in several newspapers; the references here are only examples.

=== Students ===
In 1856 there were 226 students and 9 faculty, and approximately 50% were African-American. Most were in the college's preparatory (high school) program.

== Curriculum and faculty ==
Grosvenor "proposed a 'free institution,' for the 'literary, scientific, moral, and physical education of both sexes and of all classes of youth.'" The school's curriculum included Classical education as well as agricultural science. The Rev. Grosvenor served as the school's first president, 1849–1851. In a newspaper advertisement we find that the Manual Labor Department was "under the supervision of Luther Wellington, a Practical Farmer, a kind and benevolent man, on a farm of 187 acres (76 ha)." Under the "careful training" of the President students took a Rhetorical Class "with daily exercises in Extemporaneous Speaking", "not to be overlooked in this day of 'public speaking'".

The college was modeled after Oberlin, which in 1835 began admitting blacks and in 1837 women. However, New York Central College was the first American college founded on the principle that all are created equal: black and white, male and female. Qualified Black, female, and Native American students were all welcome. It was also the first to have African-American professors, in a position filled by three men: first Charles L. Reason. An unexplained disagreement with Grosvenor led to his departure. His replacement was William G. Allen, a graduate of the Oneida Institute, another short-lived school which was a predecessor of the college. After Allen's departure (see below) he was replaced by George Boyer Vashon, the first African-American graduate of Oberlin. Reason was the first black college professor in the country. Allen was Professor of Rhetoric and Greek; in 1850, when he was appointed, he was "well known as a lecturer upon the origin, literature, and destiny of the African race."

In May 1850 there were over a hundred students enrolled, and college housing being full, students had to take rooms in private houses.

Shortly after its opening, the College and McGrawville were hit by a smallpox outbreak. An 1851 student resolution gives the names of two, Homer Haskell and Erskine Spring. Four students died and the College had to close briefly. Another source says six students died. At that time, there were 150 students.

In 1850 the trustees and then the students of the college published resolutions they had passed in support of William L. Chaplin, in jail for helping two slaves escape.

There were those in Syracuse and Rochester who wished to move the College to their city, but nothing came of it. The Corresponding Secretary of the Trustees, A. H. Benedict, who was also editor of the Cortland County Express, said in an editorial that no such discussions had taken place, even privately. He suggested that instead of the College relocating to Syracuse, Syracuse should relocate to McGrawville, once "it has done with theatres and their appendages, and her other and numerous sources of corruption.... The moral atmosphere of a city is not congenial to the habits of students, nor the growth of an institution founded on the manusl labor principle, and on equality of sex and condition, as is this college."

In 1851 it was one of 11 colleges to receive New York State legislative funding; it received $1,500 (equivalent to $58,050 in 2025), the same amount as New York University, Fordham University, Hamilton College, and Madison University (Colgate). A few weeks later, another report says that the college received an appropriation of $25,000 (equivalent to $967,500 in 2025), but a college solicitation in 1855 said the College had received no appropriations from the state. A Baptist report of 1851 states that its Free Mission Society raised $30,000 (equivalent to $1,161,000 in 2025) for the college.

Samuel J. May in 1851 spoke at the college on the English abolitionist George Thompson (abolitionist).

In 1852, according to Professor William G. Allen, "There is now a project on foot to attach a medical department to New York Central College. — A glorious idea this, as, if it should be successful, it will afford an opening for study to the very many colored young men who are now, by prejudice and scorn, shut out of most, if not all, of the medical colleges in the land. The faculty are physicians of Syracuse, in high standing and repute." Nothing came of this, although there is a reference to a Professor of Anatomy at the college. The medical college was established in New York City. Similarly, in 1850 there was an unsuccessful attempt to get the legislature to fund an "Agricultural Professorship".

The college's first commencement was in 1855, with 5 graduates. One of the graduates, Azariah Smith, was immediately hired to teach Greek, remaining until 1858.

In 1857 Howard W. Gilbert was hired as Professor of Modern Languages. A news article refers to his mastery of French, German, and Italian.

Also in 1857, the college had a Teachers' Department, training, at the high school level, teachers for the primary grades (normal school), an Academic Department preparing high school students for college, and a Collegiate Department. There was a class in public speaking.

== Facilities ==
Boys and men were in the dormitory occupying one floor of the main building; girls (no adult female students are recorded) were in a separate residence, with a matron. There is no reference to any housing specifically for colored students. However, there was a separate cemetery for Black college students.

== Hostility to the college ==
Because of its equalitarian treatment of Black students and its Black professors, the "nigger college at McGrawville", as it was called by racists, as well as the "McGrawville African College", received a lot of public vituperation. "It would be bad enough, in our estimation, to bring together girls and boys, young men and women, of the same race and color, under the same roof, in the same halls, and at the same table. But to mix together the descendants of Ham and Japeth [(sons of Noah)], the ebony sons of Africa with the fair daughters of the Anglo-Saxon, and the ruddy-cheeked boy with the Ethiopian maid, is stilt [sic] worse."

At that time, there not being any public colleges in the state, the New York State Legislature would appropriate funds to Union College, Hamilton College and others. A proposed appropriation to New York Central College in 1851 was the topic of much comment, the subject "the center of attractions [in the Legislature]...for some hours". A New York legislator said that rather than giving a state appropriation to that "vile sink of pollution", it would be better given to "a mob that will raze it to the ground", because it "was at war with every principle of American liberty". The New York Tribune called it a "treasonable college", an "obnoxious edifice" where, "if things are suffered to go on at this rate, this whole region will become infected with Abolitionism; the contagion of Free Speech will spread til the Fugitive Slave law will become a nullity and the Union will collapse!" Others objected, with less outrage, to "the amalgamation of sexes, as well as of races." These were, according to the Baltimore Sun, "very strange and dangerous notions". However, the appropriation passed comfortably, and was increased in size.

The local hostility to the college was a factor in its demise. As it was put in a typically inaccurate newspaper column, which mistakenly puts Mary King's father at the head of the college:

There is a pretentious wooden structure, of a semi-classic exterior, standing in the little village of McGrawville, Cortland County, N.Y., which was formerly the seat of what was known, in the anti-slavery days, as the "New York Central College." This institution was devoted to the education of negroes.... The head of this college...was a clergyman of liberal views, who became a stout advocate of intermarriage between whites and negroes: a development, by the way. which is regarded in the South to this day with holy horror, and militated against by severe penalties. But there were no statutes against miscegenation in New York in those days, so that a burly, ambitious negro, heartily in accord with the matrimonial views of the august parent, proceeded to elope one day with his daughter. This unexpected denouement quickly illustrated in a very prosaic way the disparity between theory and practice. Seizing his gun, and taking Immediate transportation in the most available vehicle, the irate parent pursued the bi-colored couple with all the impetuosity of Pharoah chasing the flying Israelites down into the Red Sea. And then the "New York Central College" for the education of negro youths experienced the sad fate of Pharoah at the hiatus of the purple waters.

=== William Allen affair ===
A scandal arose when, in 1853, an African-American professor, William G. Allen, became engaged to a white student, Mary King. To escape violent repercussions, Allen fled to New York City, where he was joined by his fiancée. They married—the first black male–white female marriage in the country's history—and immediately left for England, never to return. This event exacerbated already lingering social and political opposition to the school.

=== Decline and closure ===
In a circular of 1854 we find that "this Institution is now in prosperous condition. It has struggled through darkness, and mounted difficulties, until its permanency and success are placed entirely beyond doubt." However, only a few years later it became clear that the College was in financial trouble. "Everything that an able faculty could do to advance the interests of the Institution has been done, and yet the College has not prospered. Its friends are discouraged, and the Board of Directors disheartened. Present appearances indicate that the College will either pass into the hands of its colored friends, or be purchased by the citizens of M'Grawville [sic], and be renovated and reorganised into a seminary or academic institution [high school], or finally cease to exist as a College."

The school was later denied funding by the New York State Legislature, and it was bankrupt by 1858.

President Calkins left for a position at "an eminent law school in Albany"; the trustees persuaded Grosvenor to take up the leadership again.

The College faced bankruptcy, and discontinued operations. The philanthropist and abolitionist Gerrit Smith, who lived nearby, in Peterboro, became the proprietor of the insolvent college. He assumed its debts, which exceeded its assets; as a newspaper put it, "he became the owner of the property when the college was abandoned." A modern scholar has suggested that Smith's breakdown and hospitalization after public discovery of his connection with John Brown's failed raid on Harpers Ferry, of late 1859, contributed to the college's closure.^{(Under Smith.)}

A smallpox epidemic struck McGrawville in 1860. The effects of the outbreak, coupled with the lingering social and political opposition and financial difficulties, caused the college to close that same year. Another source says it closed in 1859.

The New York Central Railroad, with which there is no known connection, began in 1853.

=== New York Central Academy ===
According to the New York State Department of Education, New York Central Academy, organized by citizens of McGrawville, was chartered May 4, 1864. It operated from 1864 to 1867. It purchased the buildings and land for $6,500 (~$108,738 in 2025) from Gerrit Smith in 1864. In 1868 it became part of the McGrawville Union School, and remained in use as a high school until a new building was constructed in 1885.

Daniel S. Lamont (1851–1905), Secretary of War under President Grover Cleveland, was from McGraw, and studied as a child at the Central Academy, "the successor of a queer institution, known as the New York Central College, established by Gerrit Smith and other abolitionists, for the education of boys and girls without regard to color."

== Alumni ==
- Angeline Stickney, teacher, suffragist, and mathematician. Graduated in 1855 with the first class. During her last year she also taught; among her students was her eventual husband, astronomer Asaph Hall. Stickney, the largest crater on Mars's moon Phobos, is named for her. In the biography written by her son Angelo Hall there are two chapters on her experiences at the College.
- Asaph Hall, astronomer, known for his discovery of the moons of Mars.
- Edmonia Lewis, sculptor
- Mahommah Gardo Baquaqua, former slave, missionary
- Eldridge Eugene Fish, scientist and school principal.
- Herman Ossian Armour, co-founder of Armour & Co.
- Edgar M. Marble, U.S. Patent Commissioner, 1880–83
- Grace A. Mapps, graduated in 1852, possibly the first black woman to graduate with a four year college degree
- Benjamin Boseman, physician in Charleston, South Carolina, after serving in the Civil War as surgeon in the U.S. Colored Troops. Served three terms in the South Carolina House of Representatives. Appointed postmaster of Charleston by President Ulysses S. Grant.
- A. J. Warner, school principal. attorney, member of Congress from Ohio, President of the American Bimetallic League.
- George B. Davis, Esq., attorney, Ithaca, New York (not George Breckenrith Davis)
- Emma Grosvenor (ca. 1852–1853), daughter of founder Cyrus Grosvenor, died aged 21
- Sarah Grosvenor, her sister, married a Baptist minister and died at 92.
- John Quincy Cowee (1830–1921), Kansan farmer, described as "a scholar and a gentleman", with "an enviable reputation for truth and sobriety".
- Judson Smith, D.D. (1837–1906), Congregational minister, professor at Oberlin, missionary
- Truman J. Ellinwood, for 35 years stenographer of the sermons of Henry Ward Beecher.
- Martha B. O'Donnell (1836-1925), temperance activist

== See also ==
- List of defunct colleges and universities in New York
- Storer College, in Harpers Ferry, West Virginia, founded in 1868 by another branch of Free Baptists, was the second college in the United States open to all, regardless of skin color and gender. Like New York Central, most of its instruction was at the secondary school level.

== Video ==
- Kimberly, Carl; Kimberly, Mary (2018). New York Central College: An Experiment in Education in McGrawville 1848-1860. Cortland County Historical Society. Archived from the original on 2021-12-12.

== Primary sources ==
- American Baptist Free Mission Society report on the New York Central College, McGrawville, NY. 1850.
- Catalogue of the officers and students of New York Central College, for the year 1852–3, McGrawville, NY. Homer, New York. 1853.
- Commencement exercises of New York Central College. July 11, 1855.
