= Percival Hall =

American academic (1872-1953)

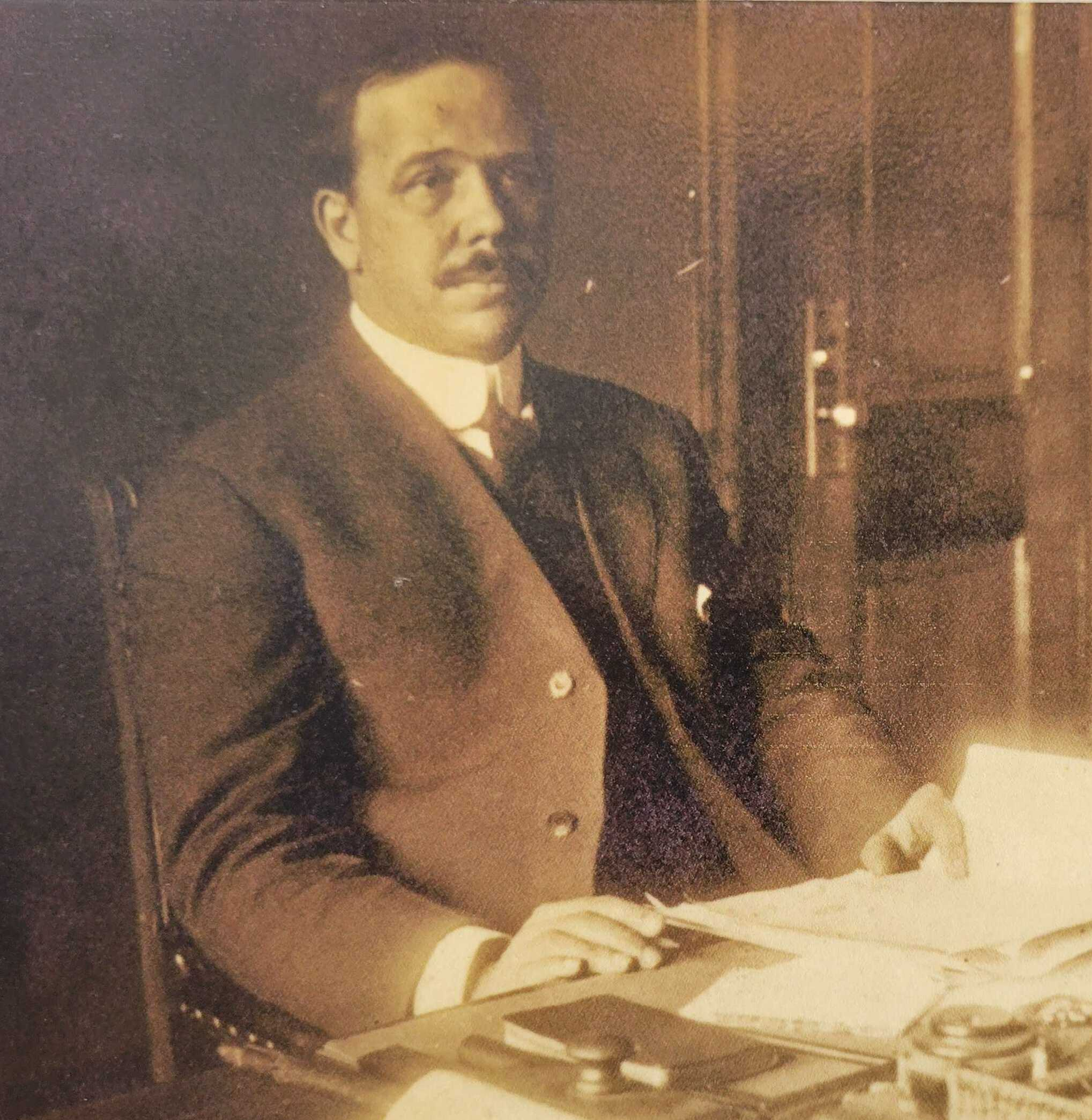
- Percival Hall Portrait

2nd President of Gallaudet University
- In office September 22, 1910 – June 16, 1945
- Preceded by: Edward Miner Gallaudet
- Succeeded by: Leonard M. Elstad

Personal details
- Born: September 16, 1872; Washington, D.C.
- Died: November 7, 1953 (aged 81); Washington, D.C.
- Spouse(s): Carolyn L. Clarke (1895-1896) (d. 1896); Ethel Zoe Taylor (1900-1953)

Percival Hall (September 16, 1872 – November 7, 1953) was the second president of Gallaudet University (then Gallaudet College) from 1910 until 1945. He was a strong advocate of the use of sign language in the education of the deaf, and also an advocate for deaf rights to vote, work, participate in sports, marry, and drive automobiles.

== Early life and education ==
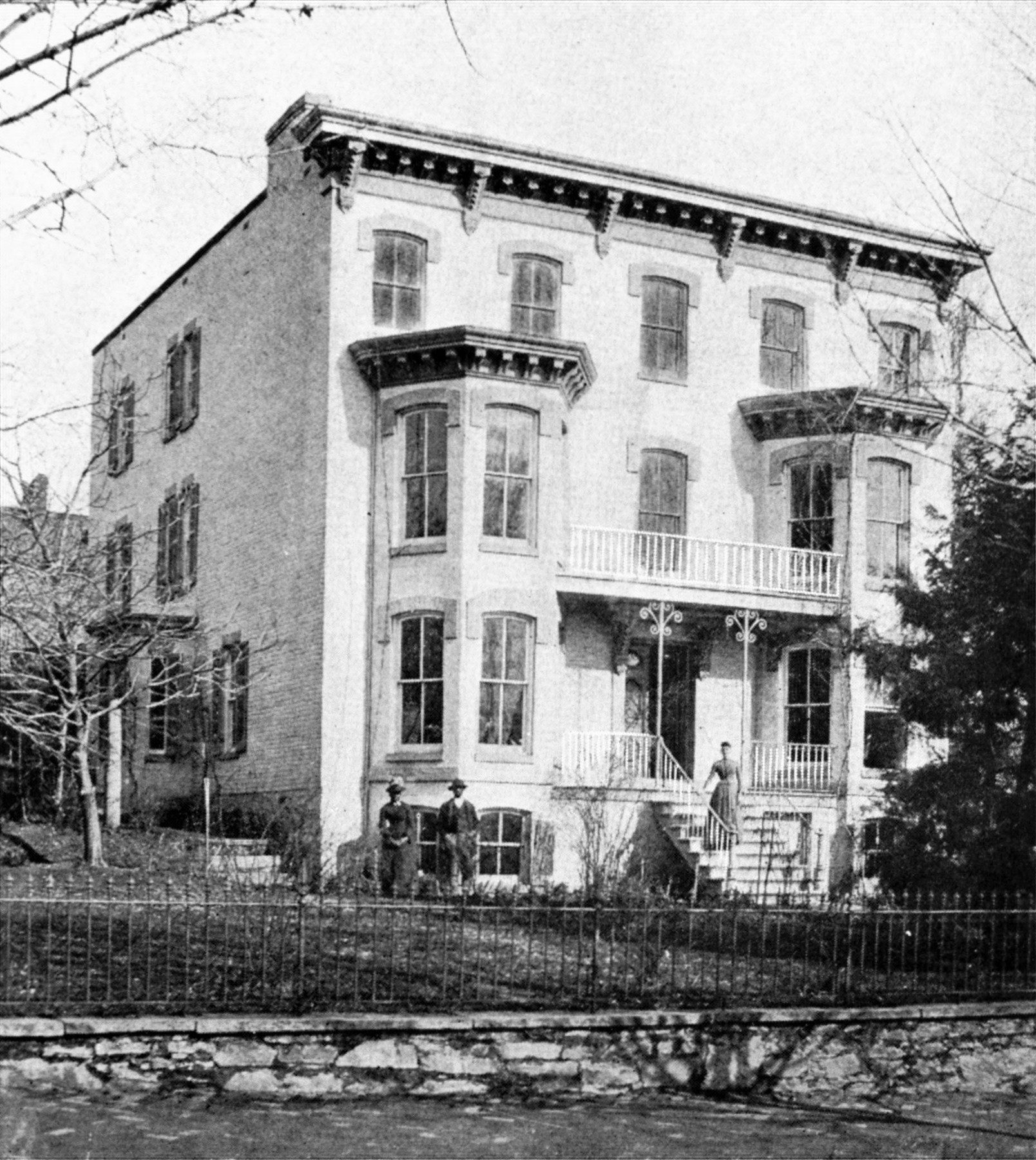
Hall's former home in the Georgetown neighborhood of Washington, D.C. Note his mother Angeline on front steps, and two Black workers. The house later served as the parsonage and fellowship hall of Alexander Memorial Baptist Church.

The son of astronomer Asaph Hall, III (1829–1907) and Angeline Stickney Hall (1830–1892), he was born in Georgetown, Washington, DC, the youngest of four brothers. His eldest brother was Asaph Hall, Jr.

Percival Hall took a degree in mathematics at Harvard University in 1892. While still a student, he worked as an architectural surveyor for the Chesapeake and Ohio Railway (C&O), making drawings of existing structures with plans for improving bridges, as well as plans for proposed structures in the expansion of the railroad. The work was hard, as much of the time was spent in wild areas that required him to camp; hunting and cooking his own food. He observed that he saw few older people in this employment and that the work took a heavy toll on his colleagues.

A friend and roommate from Harvard, Allen Bradshaw Fay, whose father, Edward Allen Fay, was the Vice President of Gallaudet College, suggested that he teach the deaf. Initially his family tried to dissuade him, as they felt that, with his adventurous spirit, he would soon be bored with life as a teacher. But, Hall felt that he could make a contribution to the developing field of deaf education.

== Gallaudet ==
Hall entered Gallaudet's Normal School, graduating with an MA in deaf education in 1893. Following his graduation, he taught at the New York School for the Deaf for two years before teaching mathematics and Latin at Gallaudet. He became president after the retirement of President Edward Miner Gallaudet in 1910. In 1935, President Hall was given an Honorary Doctorate (L.H.D.) by the college.

He felt that, given the opportunity of higher education, there were many fields in which deaf people could excel. He published many articles on the education of the deaf. He retired from the Gallaudet presidency in 1945.

== Family life ==
Hall married Carolyn L. Clarke in June 1895, but she later died of illness in January 1896. In June 1900, he married Ethel Zoe Taylor, who had been a deaf student at Gallaudet, shortly after she earned her BA. They had three children, Percival Hall, Jr. (1901 – 1968), professor of mathematics and astronomy at Gallaudet; Marion Hall Fisher, a writer (1905 – deceased, April 4, 1983); and Jonathan Hall (1912 – 2008), professor of natural science at Gallaudet. Jonathan was born in "House One," on campus, on February 6, 1912.

Academic offices
Preceded by Edward Miner Gallaudet	President of Gallaudet University; September 22, 1910 - June 16, 1945	Succeeded by Leonard M. Elstad
