= Benjamin A. Boseman =

African-American physician

Benjamin Antony Boseman Jr.

Member of the South Carolina House of Representatives
- In office 1868–1873
- Constituency: Charleston County

Postmaster of Charleston
- In office 1873–1881

Personal details
- Born: July 30, 1840 Troy, New York, U.S.
- Died: February 23, 1881 (aged 40) Charleston, South Carolina, U.S.
- Party: Republican
- Spouse: Virginia Montgomery
- Children: 2
- Education: Dartmouth College; Bowdoin College
- Occupation: Physician, politician
- Known for: First Black postmaster of Charleston; South Carolina state legislator; introduced the state's first comprehensive Civil Rights bill

Military service
- Allegiance: United States
- Branch: United States Army
- Unit: U.S. Colored Troops
- Years of service: 1863–1865
- Rank: Assistant Surgeon

Benjamin Antony Boseman Jr. (July 30, 1840 – February 23, 1881), sometimes misspelled Bozeman, was an African-American medical doctor and state legislator.

Boseman was born in Troy, New York, son of Benjamin and Annaretta Boseman, the oldest of five children. In the 1860 U.S. Census he is described as mulatto. His father was a steward on a steamboat, and then a sutler.

He studied in the Preparatory (high school) Division of New York Central College from 1854 to 1856.

After a lengthy apprenticeship with Dr. Thomas C. Brinsmade in Troy, Boseman completed his medical studies at Dartmouth Medical School in 1863 and Bowdoin College's Maine Medical College in 1864. He then served the Union as an assistant surgeon in the U.S. Colored Troops. Stationed at Camp Foster, Hilton Head, South Carolina, he treated sick and wounded soldiers, and medically examined prospective recruits.

At the end of the war he opened a medical practice in Charleston, South Carolina. In 1869 he was appointed medical doctor to the Charleston City Jail. He married Virginia Montgomery and they had two children. Another source says that he had a son Christopher and a daughter Ana, and that Virginia was mulatto.

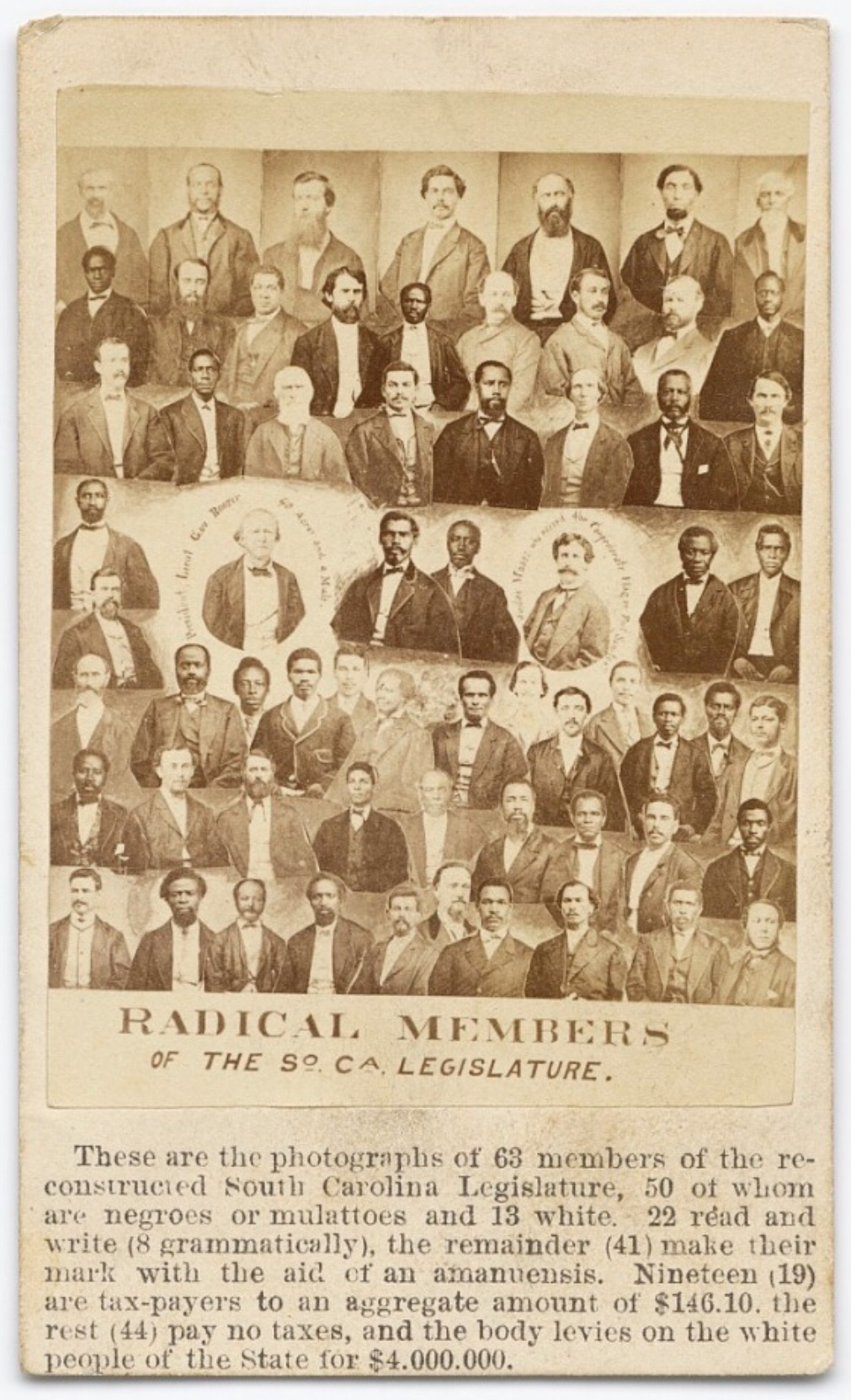
Radical Republicans in the South Carolina Legislature

Boseman served in the South Carolina House of Representatives for three consecutive terms, from 1868 until 1873, representing Charleston County. As a legislator, he introduced in 1870 South Carolina's first comprehensive Civil Rights bill.

In 1869, the South Carolina Legislature, beginning the misspelling of his name as "Bozeman", appointed him and Francis L. Cardozo trustees of South Carolina College, predecessor of the University of South Carolina. He was also appointed to the Board of Regents of the South Carolina Lunatic Asylum.

In 1872, he was nominated for Comptroller General of South Carolina, but he declined the nomination.

In 1873, President Ulysses S. Grant appointed Boseman the first Black postmaster of Charleston. His salary was $4,000 (equivalent to $107,500 in 2025). He invested in railroad and phosphate mining. Boseman served as postmaster until his death in 1881, at the age of 40 (not 41).
