= Mahommah Gardo Baquaqua =

Writer and escaped slave

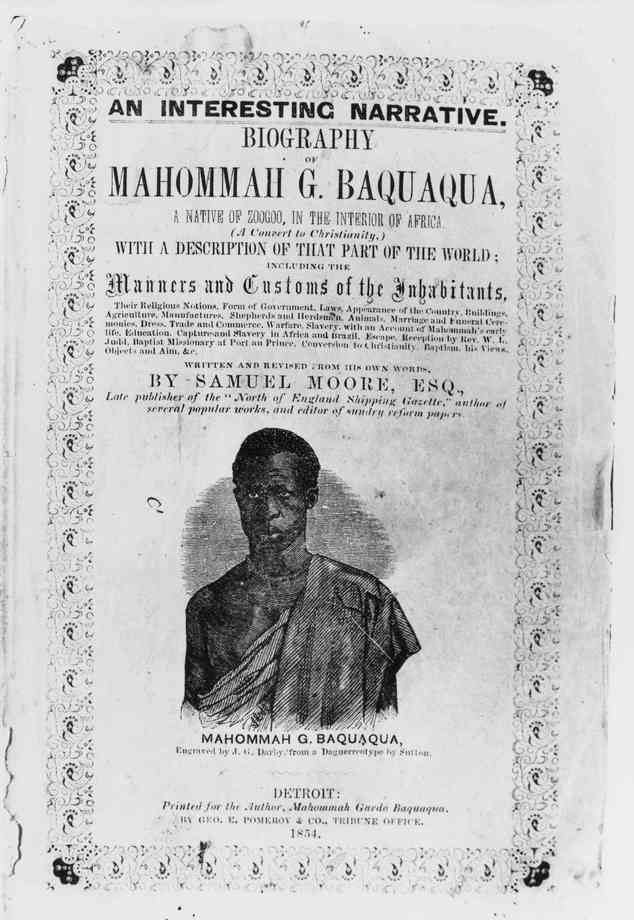
Book cover of Baquaqua's memoirs, published in 1854

Mahommah Gardo Baquaqua was a former slave, native of Zooggoo, West Africa, a tributary kingdom of Bergoo kingdom. He worked in Brazil as a captive; however, he escaped and fled to New York in 1847, assuring his freedom. He was literate in Arabic at the time of his capture, and recited a prayer in Arabic before an audience at New York Central College, where he studied from 1849 to 1853. He wrote an autobiography (slave narrative), published by American abolitionist Samuel Downing Moore in 1854. His report is the only known document about the slave trade written by a former Brazilian slave.

== Early life ==
Baquaqua was born in Djougou (currently in Benin) between 1820 and 1830 in a prominent Muslim trader family. He learned the Quran, literature and mathematics in an Islamic school. Still as an adolescent, he and his brother took part in the succession wars in Daboya, where he was captured and then rescued.

== Enslavement ==
Returning to Djougou, he became the servant of a local dignitary, perhaps the chief of Soubroukou, whom he called 'king'. The abuses he committed in that period made him target of an ambush in which he was imprisoned and transported to Dahomey; he was embarked into a slave ship in 1845 and taken to Pernambuco in Brazil.

Baquaqua was a slave in Olinda, Pernambuco for around two years. His master was a baker. He worked in the construction of houses, carrying stones, learned Portuguese, and performed as an "escravo de tabuleiro" (peddling slave). The cruelty of his Brazilian masters made him resort to alcoholism and attempt suicide.

Taken to Rio de Janeiro, Baquaqua was incorporated with the crew of the trade ship Lembrança ("A Memory"), transporting goods to the southern provinces of Brazil. In 1847, a coffee shipment to the United States was his passport to freedom. The ship arrived in New York Harbor in June, where it was approached by local abolitionists, who encouraged him to escape from the ship. After the escape, however, he was imprisoned in the local jail, and only the help of the abolitionists (who facilitated his escape from prison) prevented his return to the ship. He was then sent to Haiti, where he lived with the Reverend W. L. Judd, a Baptist missionary.

Converted to Christianity and baptized in 1848, Baquaqua returned to the US due to the political instability in Haiti. He studied at the New York Central College in upstate New York for almost three years. In 1854, he moved to Canada; his autobiography was published the same year in Detroit by Samuel Downing Moore.

It is not known what happened to Baquaqua after 1857. He was then in England and had turned to the American Baptist Free Mission Society to be sent as a missionary to Africa.
