= Presbyterian Church of McGraw =

Historic church in New York, United States

- U.S. National Register of Historic Places
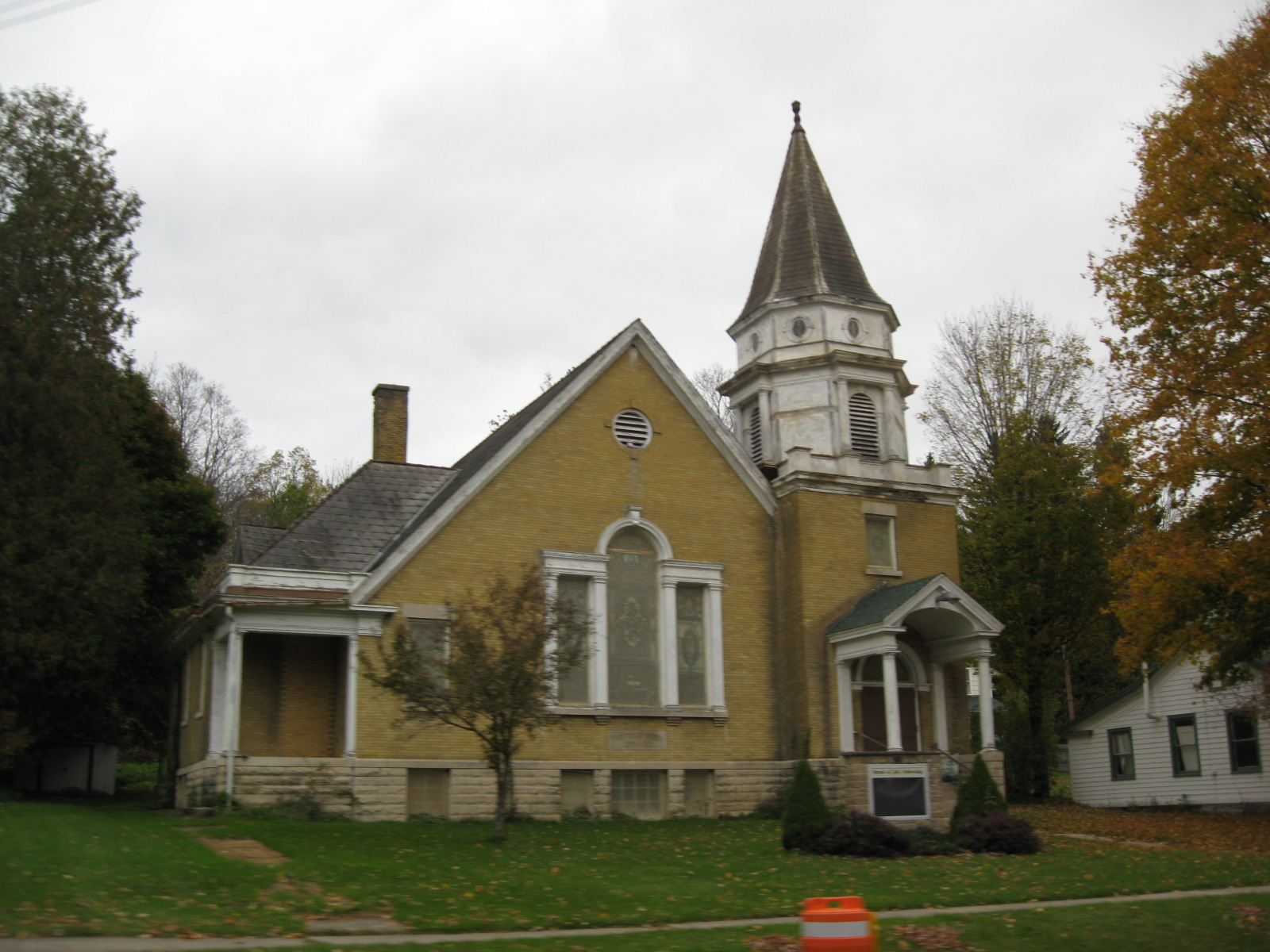
- Presbyterian Church of McGraw, October 2009

- Location within New York Location within the United States
- Location: 3 W. Main St., McGraw, New York
- Coordinates: 42°35′44″N 76°5′45″W
- Area: less than one acre
- Built: 1901
- Built by: John R. Holmes
- Architect: Pierce & Bickford
- Architectural style: Queen Anne, Eclectic Queen Anne
- NRHP reference No.: 86002517
- Added to NRHP: September 11, 1986

Presbyterian Church of McGraw is a historic Presbyterian church located at McGraw in Cortland County, New York. It was built in 1901 to designs by architects Pierce & Bickford and is a one-story structure, irregular in plan and massing, built of "Canandaigua gold brick". It features a tower that is square in plan at the base, but above the roofline rises in two octagonal stages built of wood with round arched louvered belfry openings and elliptical windows. It is topped by an octagonal spire crowned by a cast metal finial. The interior features an octagonally shaped auditorium and Palladian windows.

It was listed on the National Register of Historic Places in 2002.
