= Angeline Stickney =

American suffragist, abolitionist, and mathematician

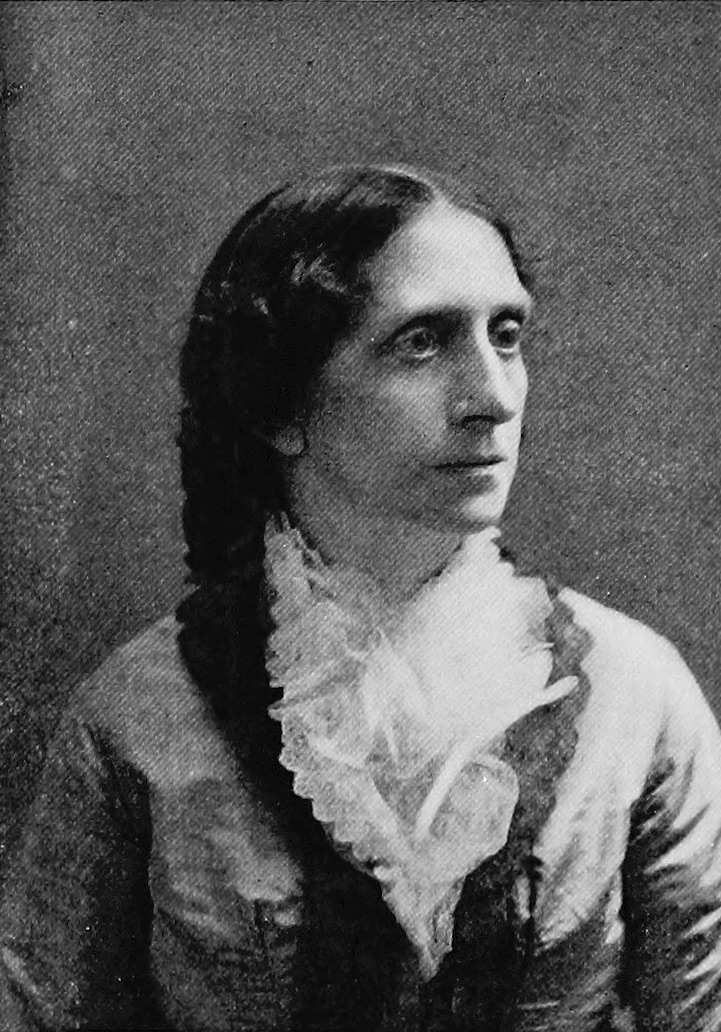
- Born: November 1, 1830
- Died: July 3, 1892 (aged 61); North Andover, Massachusetts, US
- Education: New-York Central College
- Occupations: Mathematician and suffragist
- Spouse: Asaph Hall

Chloe Angeline Stickney Hall (November 1, 1830 – July 3, 1892) was an American mathematician and suffragist. She was married to astronomer Asaph Hall and collaborated with her husband in searching for the moons of Mars, performing mathematical calculations on the data he collected.

== Early life ==
Angeline Stickney was born to Theophilus Stickney and Electa Cook on November 1, 1830. In 1847, she took three terms of study funded by her cousin, Harriette Downs, at Rodman Union Seminary. Stickney was able to attend New-York Central College with help from her sister Ruth and by teaching at the college. She majored in science and mathematics, completed coursework in calculus and mathematical astronomy, and graduated with the college's first class, in 1855. New-York Central College was a progressive school where students of modest means, including women and free African Americans, could earn a college degree. It was here that she became passionate about the causes of women's suffrage and the abolition of slavery.

Angeline Stickney and Asaph Hall met at Central College. Stickney was two years ahead of Hall. She was his instructor in geometry and German. During their days together as teacher and student, Hall and his classmates would devise questions and problems that they were convinced Stickney could not solve, yet she reportedly never failed to solve them.

== Marriage and astronomy ==
Stickney and Hall married in Elkhorn, Wisconsin, on March 31, 1856. As was common at the time, Stickney ended her formal academic career after she married. Immediately after the wedding, the couple moved to Ann Arbor, Michigan, so that Hall could continue his education at the University of Michigan. Three months later, they moved to Shalersville, Ohio. It was Stickney who communicated with her husband's employer, Captain Gillis, and successfully suggested that he should be made a professor at the Naval Observatory.

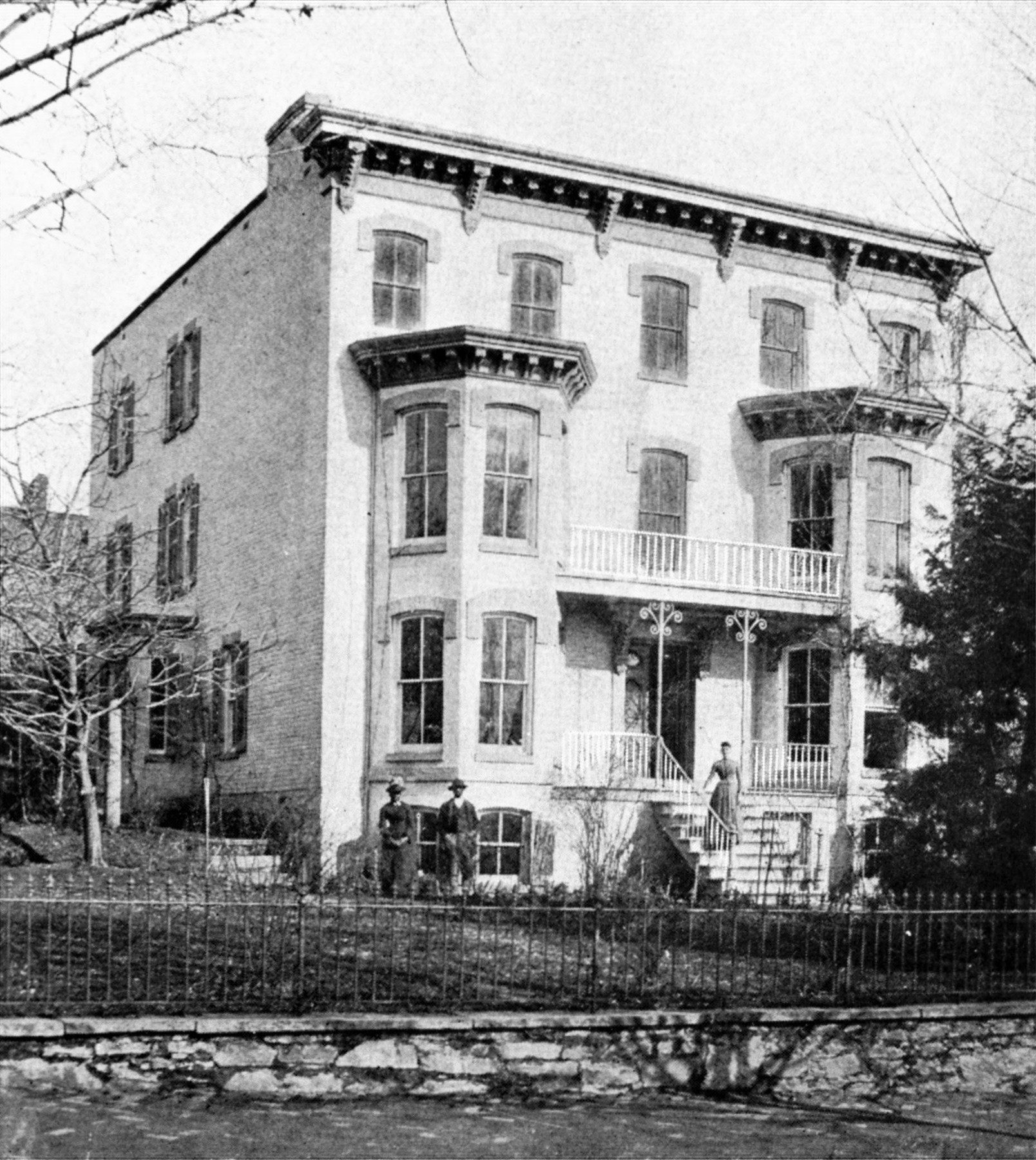
Hall's former home in the Georgetown neighborhood of Washington, D.C., after enlargement. Note Angeline on front steps and two Black workers. The house later served as the parsonage and fellowship hall of Alexander Memorial Baptist Church.

Stickney encouraged Hall to continue his search for satellites of Mars when he was ready to give up, and he successfully discovered the moons Phobos and Deimos. However, when she asked for payment equal to a man's salary for her calculations, her husband refused, and Angeline then discontinued her work.

== Personal life ==
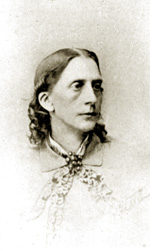
1878 portrait of Angeline Stickney Hall.

Stickney Hall home-schooled all four of her children, all of whom later attended Harvard University. Her third son, Angelo Hall, a Unitarian minister, published a biography of Hall in 1908, titled An Astronomer's Wife. Her oldest son, Asaph Hall, Jr., was born on October 6, 1859, and served as director of the Detroit Observatory from 1892 to 1905. Her other sons were named Samuel (second son) and Percival (fourth son); Percival Hall (1872–1953) was the second president of Gallaudet University from 1910 to 1946 (he himself was not deaf).

She died at North Andover, Massachusetts, at age 61. The largest crater on Phobos, Stickney Crater, is named after her.
