= McGraw, New York =

Village in New York, US

- Village
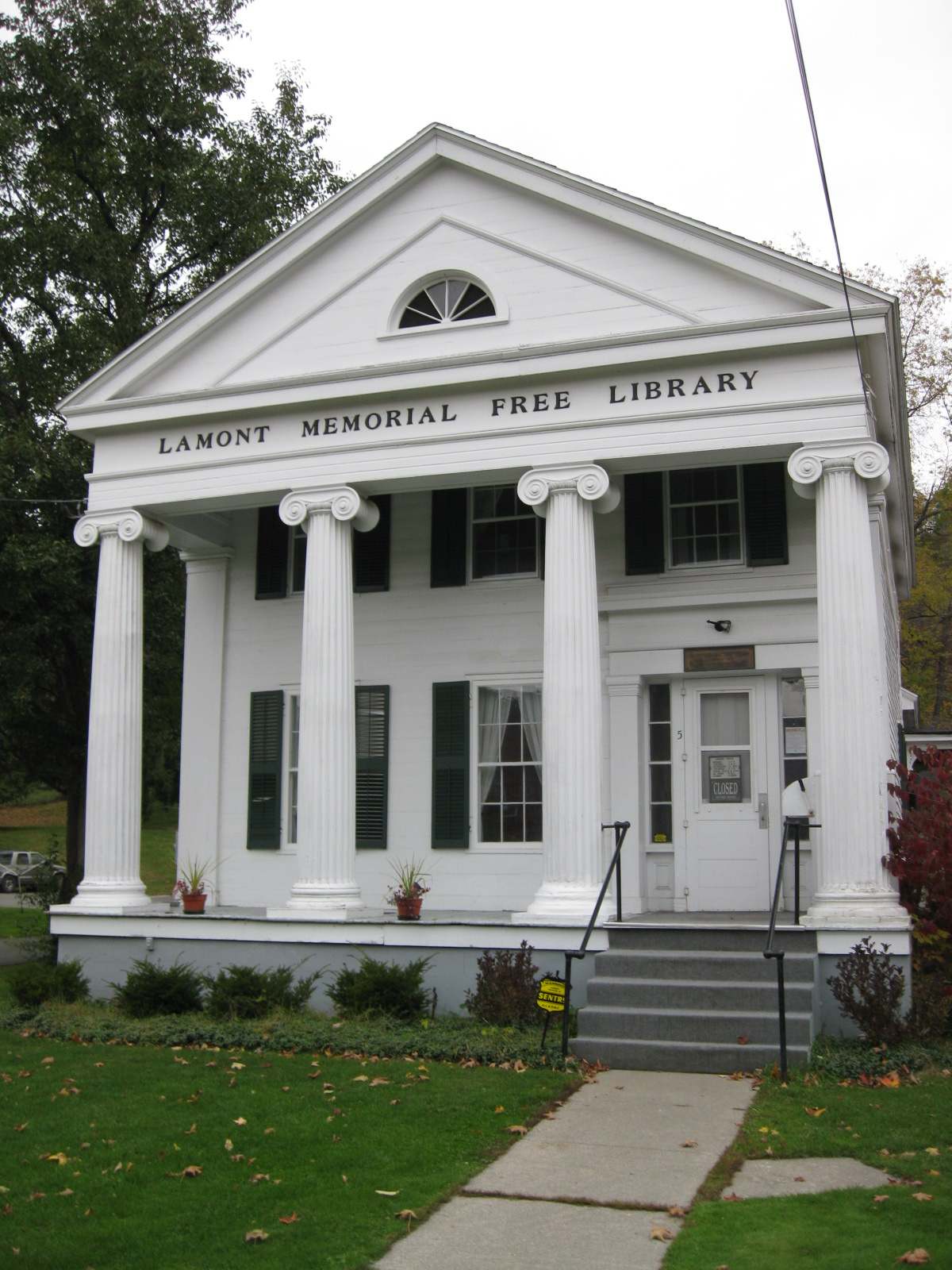
- Lamont Free Library

- Location within the state of New York
- Coordinates: 42°35′40″N 76°5′34″W
- Country: United States
- State: New York
- County: Cortland
- Town: Cortlandville

Area
  - Total: 0.99 sq mi (2.56 km^{2})
  - Land: 0.99 sq mi (2.56 km^{2})
  - Water: 0 sq mi (0.00 km^{2})
- Elevation: 1,158 ft (353 m)

Population (2020)
  - Total: 972
  - Density: 984.8/sq mi (380.24/km^{2})
- Time zone: UTC-5 (Eastern (EST))
  - Summer (DST): UTC-4 (EDT)
- ZIP code: 13101
- Area code: 607
- FIPS code: 36-44193
- GNIS feature ID: 0956771
- Website: www.villageofmcgraw.gov

McGraw is a village in Cortland County, New York, United States. The population was 972 as of the 2020 census. The village is named after Samuel McGraw and is in the eastern part of the town of Cortlandville, east of the city of Cortland.

== History ==
The community was first settled in 1805 by Samuel McGraw, who came with his wife and family from Vermont. He built a log cabin (no longer standing) and was followed by Jonathan Taylor and a handful of other New Englanders. McGrawville, as the settlement later came to be known, grew up on either side of the road near McGraw's initial homestead, taking advantage of water power on the adjacent Trout Brook to drive an early grist mill (1812) and a sawmill. An ashery was established at an early date to profit from the clearing of new farmlands in the surrounding area, and in 1818, the hamlet acquired its first store. In 1823, a cemetery was established within the boundary of the Main Street Historic District, and, by 1830, ten houses had been built within the small settlement."

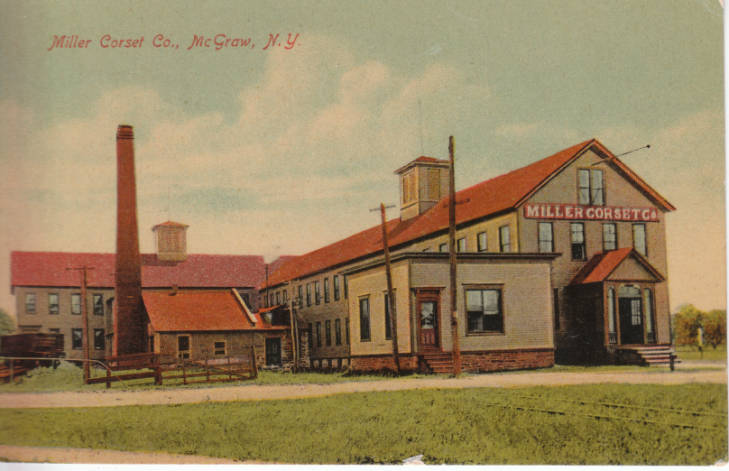
Color postcard of the Miller Corset Company in McGraw, NY from 1905

Originally it was called McGrawville, and that name appears on an 1855 map, but it was officially incorporated as McGraw in 1869. (There is a hamlet McGrawville further west in Allegany County, New York.) In the 19th century the community styled itself as "Corset City" for several decades of corset manufacturing. P.H. McGraw & Son produced corsets in the 1880s until mismanagement of an unrelated produce business led them to sell their interests to the Warner Bros. of New York, later known as the Warnaco Group. The factory was reopened and incorporated as the McGraw Corset Company in 1890 and employed over 400 men and women in the area. In 1901, William J. Buchanan, a former employee of both the P.H. McGraw & Son and McGraw Corset Company, founded the Empire Corset Company. The Empire Corset Company was known for the “Never Rust” corset, the “Sorosis” and the “Reduzyou” styles, and sold internationally. They employed 215 women and 35 men. In 1910 the company manufactured one hundred thousand dozen corsets. The McGraw Corset Company was the largest industry in the area, employing over 400 men and women in the factory and, additionally, providing women in the area piece work to do in their homes. Simultaneously, the village was home to the Vesta Corset Company and the Miller Corset Company.

The village was home to New-York Central College, McGrawville, an institution of higher learning founded by Free Baptists in 1849. The college was notable because it was the first college in the United States founded to accept all students, including both women and African Americans. About half of its students were African American. The college also employed three black professors, the first time in the United States where black professors taught white students. A smallpox epidemic, along with social and political opposition and financial problems, brought about the college's closure in 1859 or 1860.

In 1852, the village had "some five or six stores, one tavern, and three churches".

The Main Street Historic District and Presbyterian Church of McGraw are listed on the National Register of Historic Places.

== Geography ==
McGraw is located at 42°35′40″N 76°5′34″W (42.594547, -76.092899). State Route 41 runs through the village, leading west 2 miles (3 km) to Interstate 81 and U.S. Route 11. Downtown Cortland is a further 2 miles (3 km) to the west. NY 41 leads east 4 miles (6 km) to the hamlet of Solon.

According to the United States Census Bureau, McGraw has a total area of 0.99 square miles (2.56 km^{2}), all land.

The village is in the valley of Trout Brook, east of the Tioughnioga River and part of the Susquehanna River watershed.

== Demographics ==
Historical population
Census	Pop.	Note	%±
1870	517		—
1880	637		23.2%
1890	733		15.1%
1900	750		2.3%
1910	931		24.1%
1920	1,032		10.8%
1930	1,082		4.8%
1940	1,201		11.0%
1950	1,197		−0.3%
1960	1,276		6.6%
1970	1,319		3.4%
1980	1,188		−9.9%
1990	1,074		−9.6%
2000	1,000		−6.9%
2010	1,053		5.3%
2020	972		−7.7%
U.S. Decennial Census

As of the census of 2000, there were 1,000 people, 382 households, and 270 families residing in the village. The population density was 1,015.7 inhabitants per square mile (392.2/km^{2}). There were 444 housing units at an average density of 451.0 per square mile (174.1/km^{2}). The racial makeup of the village was 97.20% White, 0.20% African American, 0.80% Native American, 0.20% from other races, and 1.60% from two or more races. Hispanic or Latino of any race were 0.90% of the population.

As of the census of 2000 the largest self-reported ancestry groups in McGraw were: English at 31%, German at 13%, Irish at 12%, Dutch at 7%, Italian at 6%, French at 6%, Polish at 4%, Scottish at 1%, Scotch-Irish at 1%, Welsh at 1%, Greek at 1%, American Indian tribes, specified at 1% and Portuguese at 1%

There were 382 households, out of which 35.1% had children under the age of 18 living with them, 54.7% were married couples living together, 12.3% had a female householder with no husband present, and 29.1% were non-families. 22.5% of all households were made up of individuals, and 13.4% had someone living alone who was 65 years of age or older. The average household size was 2.60 and the average family size was 3.00.

In the village, the population was spread out, with 27.1% under the age of 18, 8.9% from 18 to 24, 27.4% from 25 to 44, 20.9% from 45 to 64, and 15.7% who were 65 years of age or older. The median age was 36 years. For every 100 females, there were 94.2 males. For every 100 females age 18 and over, there were 87.9 males.

The median income for a household in the village was $33,750, and the median income for a family was $38,654. Males had a median income of $27,361 versus $22,063 for females. The per capita income for the village was $15,076. About 9.8% of families and 9.9% of the population were below the poverty line, including 11.7% of those under age 18 and 12.7% of those age 65 or over. The top 5 ethnic groups in McGraw are.· English at 31%, Germans at 13%, Irish at 12%, Dutch at 7% and Italians at 6%.

== Notable people ==
- Reuben G. Doud, Wisconsin businessman and legislator, born in McGraw
- Angeline Stickney Hall, American suffragist, abolitionist, and mathematician who taught at New-York Central College. Among her students was her eventual husband, astronomer Asaph Hall. The largest crater on Phobos is named for her.
- Asaph Hall, American astronomer who discovered the Mars satellites Phobos and Deimos, graduated from New-York Central College.
- Daniel Scott Lamont (February 9, 1851 – July 23, 1905), United States Secretary of War during Grover Cleveland's second term.
- Abram Pryne, Congregational minister, editor of the Central Reporter, an abolitionist newspaper published in McGrawville. Most famous for debating William G. Brownlow, a pro-slavery Tennessee newspaper editor and later governor, on slavery in Philadelphia in 1858; the debate was published. Member of the State Assembly in the 85th New York State Legislature in 1862, representing Wayne County.
- New-York Central College was the alma mater of Charles L. Reason, educator.
