= Asaph Hall =

American astronomer (1829–1907)

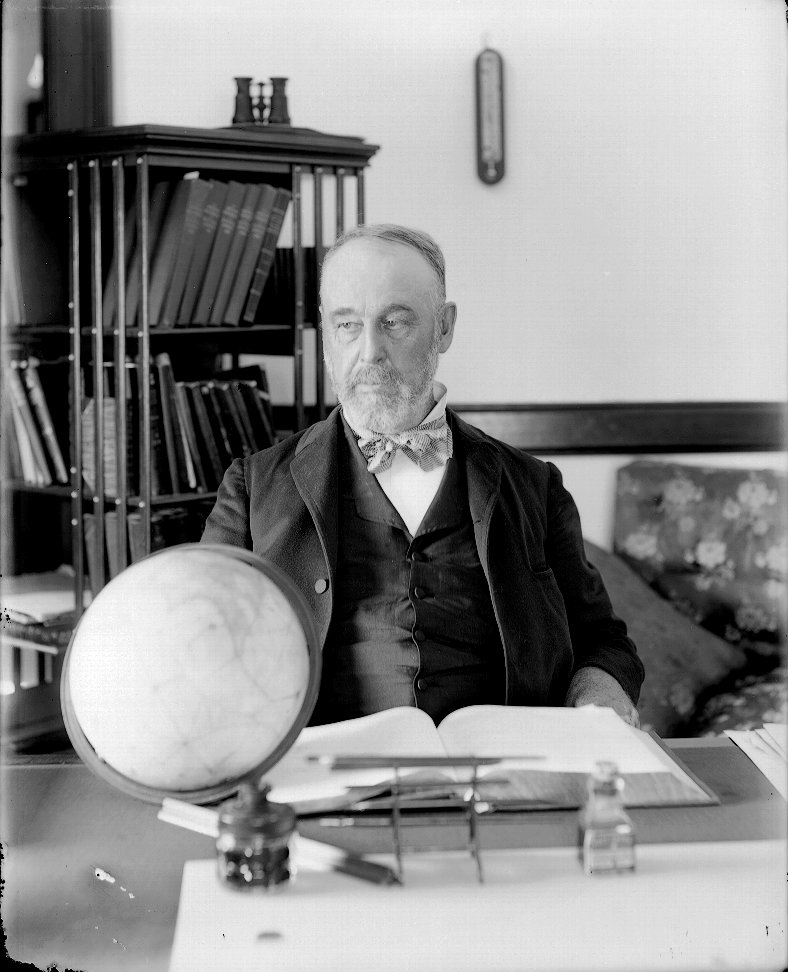
- Hall at the USNO in 1899
- Born: October 15, 1829; Goshen, Connecticut, US
- Died: November 22, 1907 (aged 78); Annapolis, Maryland, US
- Education: New-York Central College, McGrawville
- Occupation: Astronomer
- Known for: Discovery of the two moons of Mars
- Spouses: Angeline Stickney (m. 1856; died 1892) Mary Gauthier (m. 1901)
- Children: 4, including Asaph Hall, Jr. and Percival Hall

Asaph Hall III (October 15, 1829 – November 22, 1907) was an American astronomer who is best known for having discovered the two moons of Mars, Deimos and Phobos, in 1877. He determined the orbits of satellites of other planets and of double stars, the rotation of Saturn, and the mass of Mars.

== Biography ==
Hall was born in Goshen, Connecticut, the son of Asaph Hall II (1800–42), a clockmaker, and Hannah Palmer (1804–80). His paternal grandfather Asaph Hall I (June 11, 1735 – March 29, 1800) was a Revolutionary War officer and Connecticut state legislator. His father died when he was 13, leaving the family in financial difficulty, so Hall left school at 16 to become an apprentice to a carpenter. He later enrolled at the New-York Central College in McGrawville, New York, where he studied mathematics. There he took classes from an instructor of geometry and German, Angeline Stickney. In 1856 they married.

In 1856, Hall took a job at the Harvard College Observatory in Cambridge, Massachusetts, and turned out to be an expert computer of orbits. Hall became assistant astronomer at the US Naval Observatory in Washington, D.C. in 1862, and within a year of his arrival he was made professor.

On June 5, 1872 Hall published an article entitled "On an experimental determination of $\pi$" in the journal Messenger of Mathematics. In this article, Hall reported the results of an experiment in random sampling that Hall had persuaded his friend, Captain O.C. Fox, to perform when Fox was recuperating from a wound received at the Second Battle of Bull Run. The experiment involved repetitively throwing at random a fine steel wire onto a plane wooden surface ruled with equidistant parallel lines.

An approximation of $\pi$ was then computed as $2ml/an$, where $m$ is the number of trials, $l$ is the length of the steel wire, $a$ is the distance between parallel lines, and $n$ is the number of intersections. This paper, an experiment on Buffon's needle problem, is a very early documented use of random sampling in scientific inquiry, which Nicholas Metropolis named the Monte Carlo method during the Manhattan Project of World War II.

In 1875, Hall was given responsibility for the USNO 26-inch (66-cm) telescope, the largest refracting telescope in the world at the time. It was with this telescope that he discovered Phobos and Deimos in August 1877. Hall also noticed a white spot on Saturn which he used as a marker to ascertain the planet's rotational period. In 1884, Hall showed that the position of the elliptical orbit of Saturn's moon, Hyperion, was retrograding by about 20° per year. Hall also investigated stellar parallaxes and the positions of the stars in the Pleiades star cluster.

Hall was responsible for apprenticing Henry S. Pritchett at the Naval Observatory in 1875.

=== Discovery of Phobos and Deimos ===
During Mars's closest approach in 1877, Hall was encouraged by Angeline Stickney, his wife, to search for the Martian moons. His calculations had shown that the orbit should be very close to the planet. Hall wrote "The chance of finding a satellite appeared to be very slight, so that I might have abandoned the search had it not been for the encouragement of my wife."

Asaph Hall discovered Deimos on August 12, 1877 at about 07:48 UTC and Phobos on August 18, 1877, at the US Naval Observatory in Washington, D.C., at about 09:14 GMT (contemporary sources, using the pre-1925 astronomical convention that began the day at noon, give the time of discovery as 11 August 14:40 and 17 August 16:06 Washington mean time respectively). At the time, he was deliberately searching for Martian moons. Hall had previously seen what appeared to be a Martian moon on August 10, but due to bad weather, he could not definitively identify them until later.

Hall recorded his discovery of Phobos in his notebook as follows:

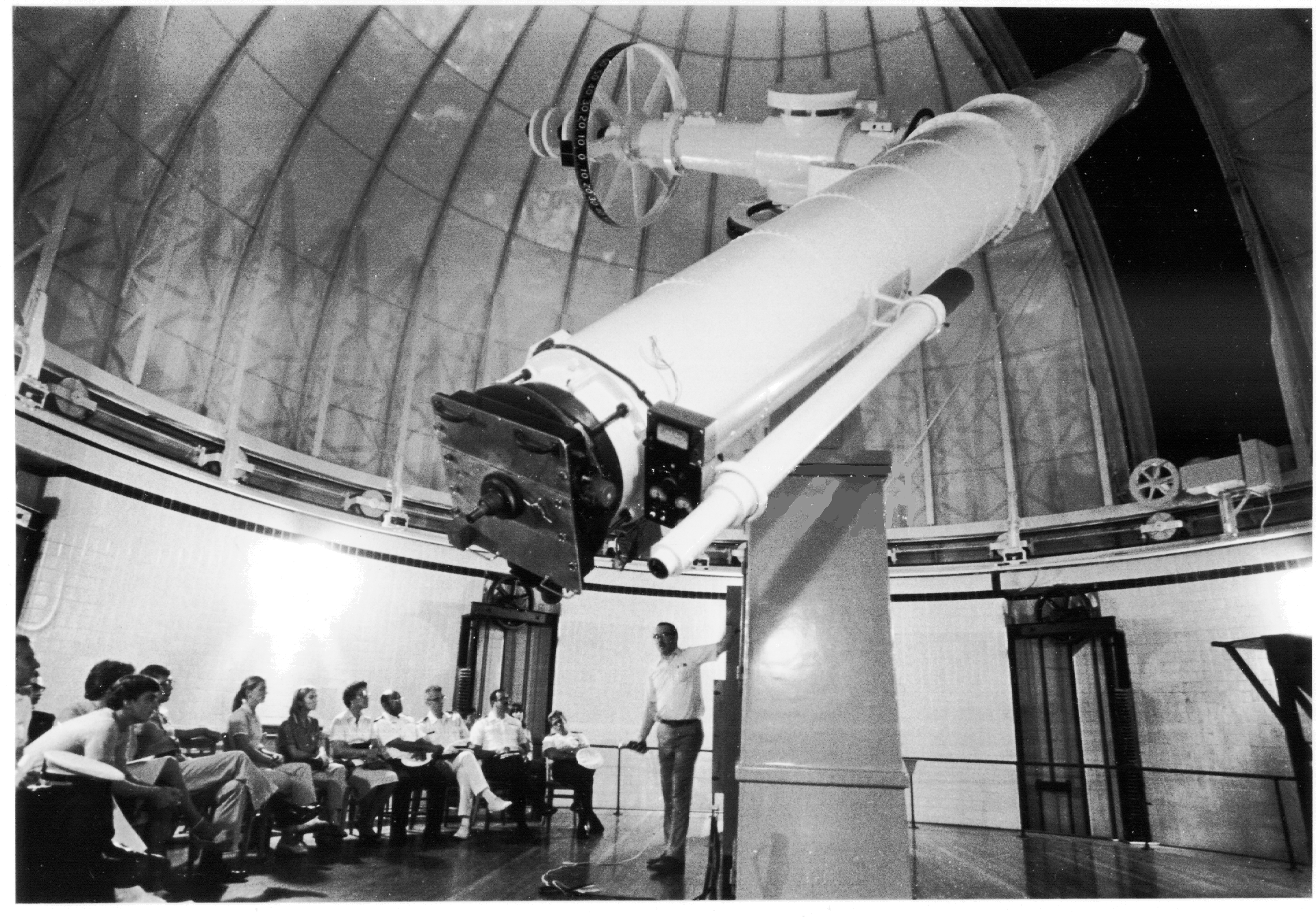
The telescope used to discover the Martian moons

"I repeated the examination in the early part of the night of 11th [August 1877], and again found nothing, but trying again some hours later I found a faint object on the following side and a little north of the planet. I had barely time to secure an observation of its position when fog from the River stopped the work. This was at half past two o'clock on the night of the 11th. Cloudy weather intervened for several days.
"On 15 August the weather looking more promising, I slept at the Observatory. The sky cleared off with a thunderstorm at 11 o'clock and the search was resumed. The atmosphere however was in a very bad condition and Mars was so blazing and unsteady that nothing could be seen of the object, which we now know was at that time so near the planet as to be invisible.
"On 16 August the object was found again on the following side of the planet, and the observations of that night showed that it was moving with the planet, and if a satellite, was near one of its elongations. Until this time I had said nothing to anyone at the Observatory of my search for a satellite of Mars, but on leaving the observatory after these observations of the 16th, at about three o'clock in the morning, I told my assistant, George Anderson, to whom I had shown the object, that I thought I had discovered a satellite of Mars. I told him also to keep quiet as I did not wish anything said until the matter was beyond doubt. He said nothing, but the thing was too good to keep and I let it out myself. On 17 August between one and two o'clock, while I was reducing my observations, Professor Newcomb came into my room to eat his lunch and I showed him my measures of the faint object near Mars which proved that it was moving with the planet.
"On 17 August while waiting and watching for the outer moon, the inner one was discovered. The observations of the 17th and 18th put beyond doubt the character of these objects and the discovery was publicly announced by Admiral Rodgers."

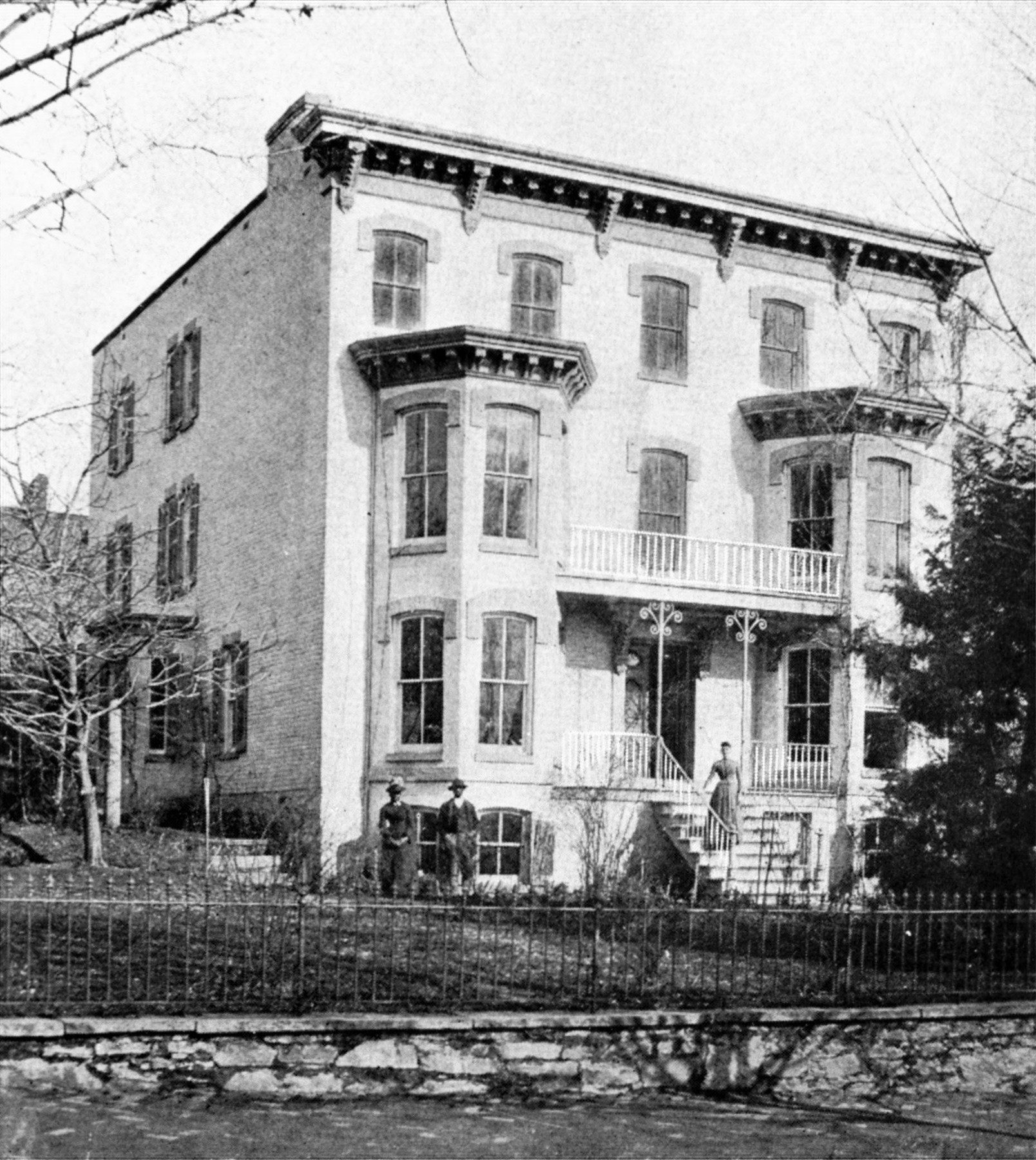
Hall's former home in the Georgetown neighborhood of Washington, D.C., after enlargement. Note Angeline on front steps and two workers.

Hall retired from the Navy in 1891. He became a lecturer in celestial mechanics at Harvard University in 1896, and continued to teach there until 1901.

== Family ==
The Halls had four children. Asaph Hall, Jr. (1859–1930) became an astronomer. Samuel Stickney Hall (1864–1936) worked for Mutual Life Insurance Company. Angelo Hall (1868–1922) became a Unitarian minister and professor of mathematics at the US Naval Academy. Percival Hall (1872–1953) became president of Gallaudet University.

Angeline Hall died in 1892. In 1901, Hall married Mary Gauthier, after he fully retired to Goshen, Connecticut.

Hall died in November 1907 while visiting his son Angelo in Annapolis, Maryland.

== Awards and honors ==
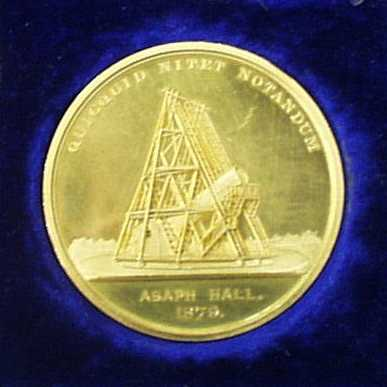
Hall's Gold Medal of the Royal Astronomical Society

Hall was elected as a member to the American Philosophical Society in 1878. He won the Lalande Prize of the French Academy of Sciences in 1878, the Gold Medal of the Royal Astronomical Society in 1879, the Arago Medal in 1893, and was made a Chevalier in the Ordre national de la Légion d'honneur (French Legion of Honor) in 1896.

In 1885, he was President of the Philosophical Society of Washington. Hall crater on the Moon and Hall crater on the Martian moon Phobos are named in his honor.
